= Disney v. DeSantis =

2023 American lawsuit

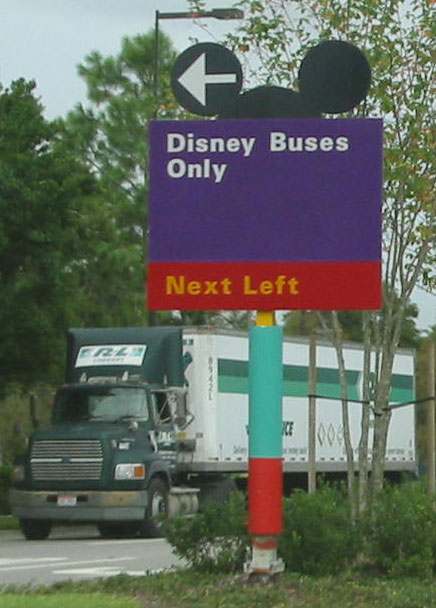
- Typical sign in the Walt Disney World Resort, on Buena Vista Drive north, just past Hotel Plaza Boulevard, on August 15, 2003. This is on public property owned by the Reedy Creek Improvement District.
- Court: United States District Court for the Northern District of Florida
- Full case name: Walt Disney Parks and Resorts, Inc. v. Ronald D. DeSantis, Meredith Ivey, Martin Garcia, Michael Sasso, Brian Aungst, Jr., Ron Peri, Bridget Ziegler, and John Classe
- Decided: January 31, 2024
- Docket nos.: 4:23-cv-00163

Court membership
- Judge sitting: Allen C. Winsor

Disney v. DeSantis was a lawsuit brought against Florida governor Ron DeSantis by the Parks, Experiences and Products division of The Walt Disney Company in 2023 in the United States District Court for the Northern District of Florida. The plaintiff claims that DeSantis, with Florida Department of Economic Opportunity acting secretary Meredith Ivey and the Central Florida Tourism Oversight District board, violated the company's First Amendment rights by using government power to exact political retaliation.

The dispute began when Disney officials, under pressure from customers and employees, expressed disapproval for the proposed Florida Parental Rights in Education Act, which had been labeled by reporters, protesters, and counter-protesters as the "Don't Say Gay" bill. After DeSantis responded angrily to Disney's disapproval, the Florida State Legislature repealed the Reedy Creek Improvement Act that had established a special governance and taxing district around Walt Disney World.

Critics of Disney argued that the district should have been reformed long before as it gave the company too much self-governing power. Critics of DeSantis argue that he made Florida's government harmful to doing business with gay people, undermined a business's right to free speech, and is hurting one of the state's largest employers and taxpayers. Among his critics were other Republican leaders, including House Speaker Kevin McCarthy and fellow presidential candidates Donald Trump and Nikki Haley.

A federal judge ruled in favor of DeSantis on January 31, 2024. A spokesperson for Disney said the company was undeterred by the ruling and intended to press forward with their case. The next day, Disney filed an appeal to the 11th Circuit Court of Appeals. On March 27, 2024, Disney settled its pending state court lawsuits with DeSantis. Per the agreement, Disney put the appeal of their federal lawsuit on hold while negotiations regarding a new development agreement play out. The settlement came a day after DeSantis replaced two Disney critics on the Central Florida Tourism Oversight District with Disney supporters and two weeks after The Parental Rights in Education Act was largely overturned by a court.

== Background ==
=== Walt Disney World and the Reedy Creek Improvement District ===
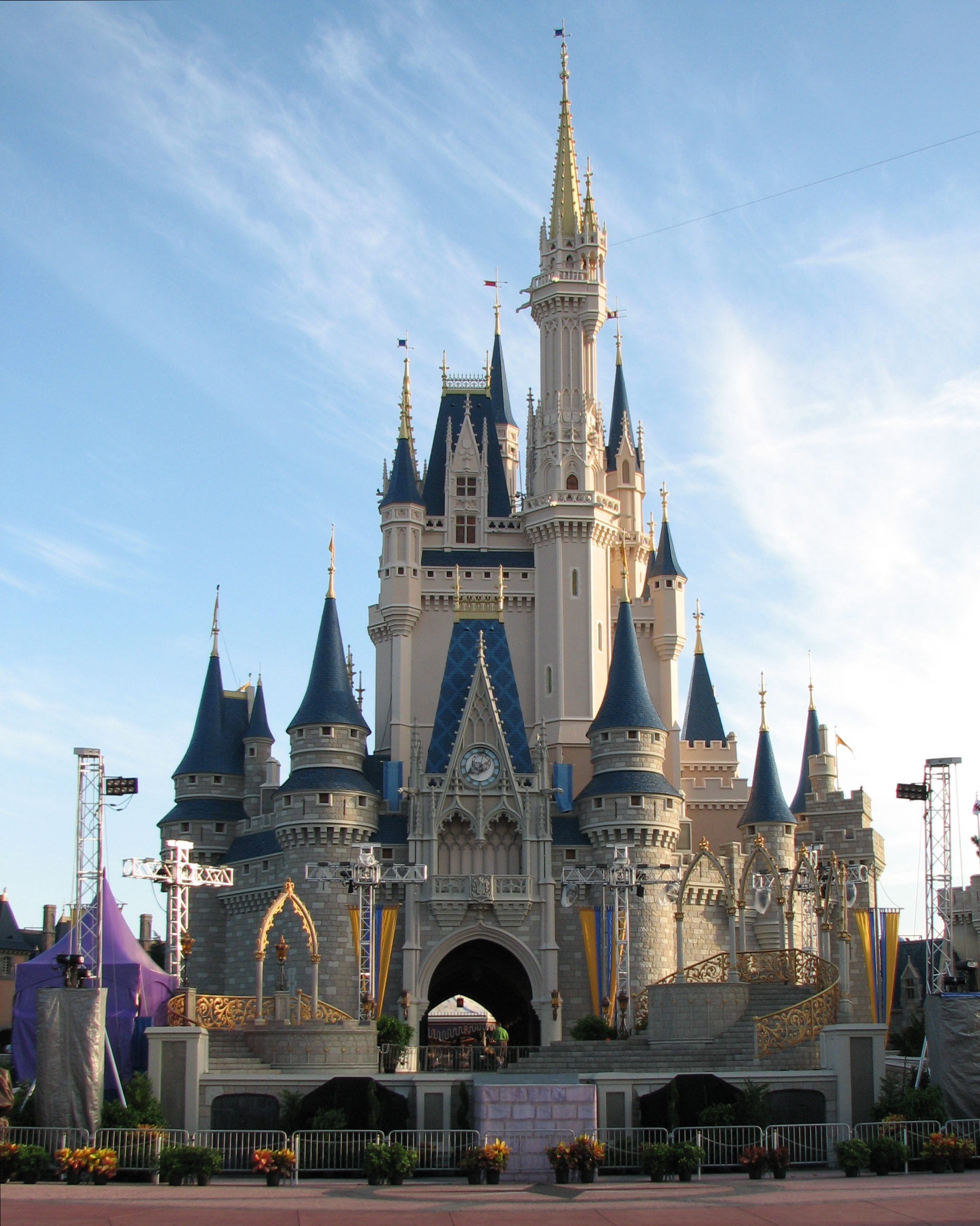
Walt Disney World was opened in Florida in 1971 and is governed by the Central Florida Tourism Oversight District

In October 1971, the entertainment resort complex Walt Disney World was opened in Bay Lake, Florida. Walt Disney World is governed by the Central Florida Tourism Oversight District, formerly the Reedy Creek Improvement District, which includes part of Orange and Osceola County. Reedy Creek was created in 1967 by the Reedy Creek Improvement Act, signed by Florida governor Claude R. Kirk Jr. (R), with the purpose being for Walt Disney to build a community (i.e. a town, to be known as EPCOT), with an emphasis on the zoning issues brothers Walt and Roy Disney faced when Disneyland opened in 1955.

=== Ron DeSantis ===
In January 2019, Ron DeSantis was elected governor of Florida. DeSantis signed the Florida Parental Rights in Education Act in March 2022, prohibiting public schools in Florida from discussing or having classroom instruction on sexual orientation or gender identity from kindergarten through third grade. Before its passage, the act spurred a political debate within The Walt Disney Company, whose then-CEO, Bob Chapek, stated that he would not take a stance against or for the bill. Although Chapek later apologized for his comments and paused political donations in the State while promising to do more, including using all company resources to force Florida to repeal the bill, a group of employees organized a series of walkouts at The Walt Disney Company headquarters in Burbank, California. As Disney heir Charlee Corra came out as transgender and condemned the law, conservative activists and pundits began protesting Disney, with activist Christopher Rufo claiming that conservatives are "waging [a] moral war against Disney". The release of a video of Disney Television Animation producer Latoya Raveneau discussing Disney's willingness to incorporate queer storytelling further intensified the feud; DeSantis voiced his support for repealing the act that created the Reedy Creek Improvement District.

On April 22, 2022, DeSantis signed a bill repealing the Reedy Creek Improvement District. Rather than seeking to dissolve Reedy Creek, DeSantis eyed seizing it, reserving that taxpayers would not be responsible for its debt, estimated to be US$1 billion, or Walt Disney World's community services. DeSantis gained control of the district on February 27, 2023.

However, before the Florida House of Representatives voted on transferring control of the district to DeSantis, the soon to be ousted Reedy Creek board members voted to give Disney functional control over the district for the foreseeable future, making the DeSantis-backed board powerless. The way the board's action was written received significant media attention. Because of rules against granting control in perpetuity, the agreement used a royal lives clause invoking King Charles III's last descendant:

This Declaration shall continue in effect until twenty one (21) years after the death of the last survivor of the descendants of King Charles III, King of England living as of the date of this Declaration.

== Lawsuit ==
On April 26, 2023, at the first meeting of the Central Florida Tourism Oversight District board, the members voted to nullify Reedy Creek's transfer of control of the district to Disney.

Within minutes of the meeting, Disney v. DeSantis was filed in federal court. In the case, Walt Disney Parks and Resorts sued DeSantis, Florida Department of Economic Opportunity acting secretary Meredith Ivey, and the Central Florida Tourism Oversight District board, accusing them of violating the company's First Amendment rights by utilizing political power for "government retaliation" purposes. The lawsuit states that DeSantis' actions "jeopardizes its economic future in the region, and violates its constitutional rights" and highlighted its value to the state of Florida; Disney is one of the largest employers in the state, provided US$1.1 billion in state and local taxes, and helps drive tourism. The lawsuit was filed by Daniel Petrocelli on Disney's behalf, a lawyer based in Los Angeles whose services were requested by former president Donald Trump in a 2016 class action lawsuit against the now-defunct Trump University.

The case was assigned to United States District Court for the Northern District of Florida chief judge Mark E. Walker, appointed by former president Barack Obama, who handed a victory to six University of Florida professors in a First Amendment case in 2022. U.S. magistrate judge Martin Fitzpatrick recused himself from the case due to a conflict of interest.

On May 1, 2023, the Central Florida Tourism Oversight District board voted to countersue Disney.

On June 1, 2023, Chief Judge Walker ruled against a motion by DeSantis to disqualify him due to previous comments in unrelated cases. However, Walker recused himself on the same day, after learning that a relative owned stock in Disney. The case was reassigned to Judge Allen C. Winsor, appointed by former president Donald Trump, who previously dismissed a case against the state involving the Florida Parental Rights in Education Act that is in the middle of the Disney v. DeSantis lawsuit. Judge Winsor was also previously the Solicitor General of Florida.

On June 26, 2023, attorneys for DeSantis filed a motion to dismiss Disney's lawsuit claiming that the Governor and Florida legislators have "legislative immunity." The lawsuit was dismissed on January 31, 2024. The next day, Disney filed an appeal to the 11th Circuit Court of Appeals.

On March 27, 2024, Disney and DeSantis reached a settlement in state court, in which Disney agreed to suspend its appeal, while it negotiated a new development agreement with the state. While the settlement cleared the way for the DeSantis-backed Central Florida Tourism Oversight District to exert more control over Disney's operations, it came only after DeSantis replaced the two most vocal Disney critics on the board with Disney supporters. It also came two weeks after The Parental Rights in Education Act was largely overturned by a court.

== Impact ==
Disney v. DeSantis was seen as a flashpoint in the 2024 Republican Party presidential primaries, in which DeSantis was running. Fellow candidates criticized DeSantis for his antagonism towards Disney. Political analysts said the feud cost DeSantis the support of "Soccer Moms in Iowa" and conservative business leaders who disliked seeing a politician use the power of government to punish a company.

Martin Garcia, the chair of the Central Florida Tourism Oversight District board, said that the district would have to raise taxes in order to pay for legal fees.

== Responses and commentary ==
=== DeSantis's response ===
Disney v. DeSantis was filed during DeSantis' overseas trade tour and foreign visit to Israel, in which he spoke at The Jerusalem Post's "Celebrate the Faces of Israel" event. At a news conference at the Museum of Tolerance Jerusalem, DeSantis said the lawsuit was without merit.

=== Republican response ===
Former president Donald Trump said that DeSantis "is being absolutely destroyed by Disney." Republican presidential candidate Vivek Ramaswamy referenced a social media bill signed into law by DeSantis in 2021, wherein Disney was able to provide an exemption for themselves. Other critical Republicans include former New Jersey governor Chris Christie, New Hampshire governor Chris Sununu, and former Arkansas governor Asa Hutchinson. Presidential candidate Nikki Haley said that Disney should move to the "anti-woke" South Carolina, while Speaker of the House Kevin McCarthy urged DeSantis and Disney to negotiate.

=== Analysis ===
Floyd Abrams, who represented The New York Times in New York Times Co. v. United States, said that the lawsuit would survive a motion to dismiss and that it was a "serious First Amendment case". Legal scholar Rebecca Tushnet concurred. Law professor RonNell Andersen Jones noted that Disney has been afforded considerable First Amendment protections due to conservative justices on the Supreme Court, contrasting previous stances with current rhetoric from conservatives. Lawyer and columnist for The New York Times David French invoked O'Hare Truck Service, Inc. v. City of Northlake and said that, should Disney lose the case, the courts would "cast a pall of fear over private expression".

After the settlement was reached, DeSantis claimed it was a total victory for him. Legal analysts however said that to achieve that victory, DeSantis had given Disney everything they wanted.

=== Online response ===
The lawsuit divided fans of Disney, with moderators for a Walt Disney World subreddit removing dozens of comments. Tom Bricker, who operates Disney Tourist Blog, said he attempted to keep the comments on his blog neutral while continuing to write blog posts.

== See also ==
- Florida tourism industry
