= Disney and Florida's Parental Rights in Education Act =

Disney's involvement with Florida state law

From March 2022 until June 2024, The Walt Disney Company was involved in a feud with Florida governor Ron DeSantis and the state's Republican Party over Florida's Parental Rights in Education Act, commonly known as the "Don't Say Gay" bill. While initially a donor to some of the politicians who voted in favor of the Act, after its passage Disney spoke out against the bill and called for it to be repealed.

The provisions of the Parental Rights in Education Act prohibit classroom instruction on sexual orientation or gender identity from kindergarten to 3rd grade in Florida public school districts, or instruction on sexual orientation and gender identity in a manner that is not "age appropriate or developmentally appropriate for students" in any grade. On March 7, 2022, Disney CEO Bob Chapek declared that the company would not take a public stance on the bill and would instead focus on effecting change through the commercial content it produces. However, some individuals associated with Disney spoke out against its stance. Following the controversy, Disney reinstated a same-sex kiss in Pixar's 2022 film Lightyear, hosted a town hall meeting to discuss the bill's impact on company employees and their families, and promised to challenge the bill.

Responding to Disney's disapproval of the law, DeSantis and Florida lawmakers threatened to repeal the Reedy Creek Improvement Act, a special district giving Disney further authoritative control over the area surrounding Walt Disney World in Lake Buena Vista, Florida. A bill was passed in the state's house and senate chambers which repealed the special district, which was signed by DeSantis in April 2022. In response to the bill and further legislation against Disney, the company filed suit against DeSantis, claiming that the legislation was politically motivated and limited the free speech of the company, however the judge ultimately ruled in favor of DeSantis on January 31, 2024. A spokesperson for Disney said the company was undeterred by the ruling and intended to press forward with their case. The next day, Disney filed an appeal to the 11th Circuit Court of Appeals. On March 27, 2024, Disney settled its pending state court lawsuits with DeSantis. Per the agreement, Disney put the appeal of their federal lawsuit on hold while negotiations regarding a new development agreement with Florida play out. However, no alterations to Disney's appeal of the federal lawsuit were made. The settlement came a day after DeSantis replaced two Disney critics on the Central Florida Tourism Oversight District with two Disney supporters and two weeks after the State of Florida settled a separate lawsuit with advocates, overturning a "large part" of the law, and clarifying the law's scope to allow for discussions and books about LGBTQ rights and people, with both sides claiming victory.

== Background ==
On February 24, 2022, the Florida House of Representatives passed the Parental Rights in Education Act with 69 in favor and 47 against. Commonly referred to as the "Don't Say Gay" bill by its opponents, it prevents public schools from holding discussions on sexual orientation and gender identity, stating that lessons "may not occur in kindergarten through grade 3 or in a manner that is not age-appropriate or developmentally appropriate for students in accordance with state standards". The latter passage has been criticized for its vague language, as it "could be interpreted to extend to all grade levels", and potentially forbid students from discussing their lives within a classroom setting. The bill will also allow parents to sue teachers or schools for engaging with these topics. On March 8, the bill passed the Florida Senate and was signed by the governor, Ron DeSantis, on March 28.

The Orlando Sentinel reported in February 2022 that The Walt Disney Company has donated money to all of the bill's sponsors and cosponsors, with The Verge reporting that the donations have totaled around $200,000. On March 7, Disney CEO Bob Chapek released an internal statement proclaiming the company would stand by its LGBT employees, but it would not be taking a public stance either condemning or supporting the bill. According to Chapek, Disney can have its biggest impact in "creating a more inclusive world [...] through the inspiring content [the company] produce[s]".

A day after the bill passed, Chapek condemned the legislation and offered a donation of $5 million to the LGBT advocacy group Human Rights Campaign (HRC), which was refused by the organization until further action against anti-LGBT legislation was taken; however, HRC did acknowledge that the donation was a first step.

== Criticism of Disney ==
Disney's actions of donating money to the bill's sponsors drew criticism from various organizations and individuals associated with the company. Among the first to speak out against Disney's actions was Dana Terrace; the creator of the Disney Channel series The Owl House, who criticized Disney's decision. Other individuals that would go on to denounce Disney's and Chapek's stance include DuckTales writer Benjamin Siemon, Walt Disney's grandniece Abigail Disney, Agents of S.H.I.E.L.D. producer Drew Z. Greenberg, The Ghost and Molly McGee creator Bill Motz, and Andi Mack star Lilan Bowden. In response to the bill's passage and Disney's stance, Terrace held a live charity stream on March 13, 2022, with the proceeds going to LGBT organizations; the charity raised $70,000 for the Zebra Coalition.

Many of Disney's subsidiaries have denounced the bill and the company's stance. A statement attributed to "the LGBTQIA+ employees of Pixar, and their allies" was released, where it is stated that "beautiful stories, full of diverse characters, come back from Disney corporate reviews shaved down to crumbs of what they once were". They further criticized Chapek's statement about the biggest impact Disney can have being through its inclusive content, by revealing that "nearly every moment of overtly gay affection is cut at Disney’s behest, regardless of when there is protest from both the creative teams and executive leadership at Pixar". Marvel Studios also "denounce[d] any and ALL legislation that infringes on the basic human rights of the LGBTQIA+ community".

In response to Disney's stance, many employees planned to stage 15-minute digital walkouts starting on March 16, culminating with a day-long walkout on March 22. In an open letter, Disney's response was criticized for having "utterly failed to match the magnitude of the threat to LGBTQIA+ safety represented by [the bill]", as well as failing to integrate diversity, equity, and inclusion as one of its core values, despite claiming to do so. The protest organizers set up a website including a list of "demands for [Disney] to take to regain the trust of the LGBTQIA+ community and employees", such as the company ceasing donations to politicians that helped create and pass the bill. Another demand is for Disney to create an in-house brand that focuses on "LGBTQ+ creators and underrepresented voices", similarly to The Onyx Collective, which focuses on creators of color.

In response to Disney's changed stance on the bill, including condemnation of the legislation by Chapek and other Disney leaders, Laura Ingraham, an American conservative television host, and Sean Feucht, an American Christian singer, songwriter, were critical of the company, claiming its actions "sexualized" children, with Feucht even holding rallies outside the headquarters of the Walt Disney Studios in Burbank, California and Disneyland in Anaheim. Christopher Rufo, an American conservative activist, also said that he and other conservatives are waging a "moral war against Disney" and declared that their actions aim to target the company's "public reputation." Additionally, The Daily Wire, a conservative publication, announced a plan to invest $100 million over a three-year period in a streaming platform with live-action and animated content for children to draw in some of those who watched Disney programs. Some argued that the current criticism by such individuals and groups has "strong echoes" of anti-Disney protests by religious leaders in the late 1990s.

== Response from Disney ==
In response to the controversy surrounding Disney's involvement in the bill, the company reinstated a previously deleted kiss between two female characters in Pixar's then upcoming film Lightyear.

Disney hosted a town hall meeting on March 21 to discuss the subject with company employees, specifically the impact it can have on them and their families. The company plans to relocate around 2,000 workers from California to Florida. The meeting is part of the Reimagine Tomorrow campaign, which aims to promote diversity and inclusion at Disney. General Entertainment content president Karey Burke stated that Disney intends to produce content with "many LGBTQIA characters" in the future.

After DeSantis signed the bill, Disney released a statement that its goal is for the law to be repealed or struck down. Disney also paused their contributions to Florida political campaigns as they assessed their "approach to advocacy, including political giving in Florida."

On April 26, 2023, Disney filed a lawsuit against DeSantis and his oversight board. DeSantis responded to the lawsuit by claiming that it was politically motivated.

Following Disney's opposition to the bill, the company also forced legal pressure from inside its investor base. (Simeone v. Walt Disney Co.)

== Response from state government ==
In response to Disney's announcement of opposition to the law, DeSantis and Florida lawmakers threatened to repeal the 1967 Reedy Creek Improvement Act, which established the area surrounding the Walt Disney World Resort, the Reedy Creek Improvement District, as its own governmental authority which has same authority and responsibilities as a county government without burdening the Floridian tax payer. The repeal of this act would result in the dissolution of the Reedy Creek Improvement District and mean that the infrastructure and municipal services surrounding Walt Disney World would be absorbed by other neighbouring counties, including the estimated $1 billion in debt.

On April 19, 2022, DeSantis extended the scope of a special legislative session regarding congressional redistricting to include examination of consideration of special districts like Reedy Creek. Republican Representative Randy Fine filed House Bill 3-C that would dissolve any "special independent district" established before the November 5, 1968, ratification of the Constitution of Florida. The dissolution would occur on June 1, 2023, and any districts that wished to be re-established could do so via the process in existing law. Rep. Fine claimed that the measure would only impact five districts in the state of Florida and that the Reedy Creek district was the only one involving a "high-profile" corporation. The South Florida Sun Sentinel reported that Fine has a love-hate relationship with Disney, noting that after Walt Disney World re-opened after COVID-19 shutdowns in Florida, he described the theme park as an "engine of our economy."

Also on April 19, Republican State Senator Jennifer Bradley filed two bills: Senate Bill 4-C (an identical bill to House Bill 3-C in the Florida State Senate), and Senate Bill 6-C, which eliminates the exemption to Florida's 2021 anti-deplatforming Senate Bill 7072 for any owners of "theme park or entertainment complexes." At the time, the exemption was added to exclude Disney+'s service from the regulations. The Tampa Bay Times reported that the staff of DeSantis helped write the exemption included in the 2021 bill. In July 2021, Judge Robert Hinkle of the U.S. District Court for the Northern District of Florida put the law on hold arguing it compels "providers to host speech that violates their standards" and described it as a restriction on the First Amendment.

On April 20, 2022, the Florida State Senate passed Senate Bill 4-C, by a vote of 23–16 and Senate Bill 6-C, by a vote of 24–15. It was then sent to the Florida House of Representatives for approval. The House of Representatives approved the bill on April 21 by a vote of 70–38. On April 22, DeSantis signed the bill into law, claiming at a press conference that "we have everything thought out" and that Disney would pay "more taxes" as a result of the repeal effort.

In May 2022, U.S. Senator Josh Hawley (R-MO) introduced a bill that would roll back the copyright term for new works to match the Copyright Act of 1909, which grants 28 years of protection that can be renewed for another 28 years. The bill also applies retroactively to works by a group of large companies specifically designed to target Disney. Sarah Jeong of The Verge criticized the bill for obviously violating international copyright agreements and the Fifth Amendment protections against eminent domain, as an attempt to punish Disney for opposing the Parental Rights in Education Act, and because it would not pass in a Congress where both houses were controlled by the Democratic Party.

In April 2023, Governor DeSantis and state legislators introduced more retaliatory legislation, which would subject rides and monorails at only Walt Disney World and not other major theme parks to inspection by the Florida Department of Agriculture and Consumer Services. In August 2023, the Central Florida Tourism Oversight District, controlled by DeSantis appointees, announced it was cutting its DEI committee, related job duties, and any remaining initiatives from when the district was controlled by Disney proponents.

== King Charles III loophole ==
In March 2023, one day before the Florida House of Representatives voted to hand control of the Reedy Creek Improvement District to DeSantis and his administration, the board of the district voted to implement a new slate of measures which prohibited the Florida state government from using any pieces of intellectual property owned by the company, including Cinderella Castle. Many reports on the matter and much of the internet, however, focused on the clause of the perpetuity of the agreement. In order to potentially avoid violating the rule against perpetuities, Disney's lawyers inserted a clause which would keep the agreement and prohibition valid until 21 years after the death of the last already living descendant of King Charles III of the United Kingdom and other Commonwealth realms.

== Settlement ==
On March 27, 2024, Disney and the state announced they had reached a settlement agreement. The company agreed to let stand the invalidation of the changes made right before the handover. The governor appointed a new, more Disney-friendly chair to the board, and the board agreed to operate under a 2020 plan and negotiate future development with the company.

== See also ==
- Disney and LGBTQ representation in animation
- Florida Parental Rights in Education Act
- Reedy Creek Improvement Act
- Royal lives clause
