= Immemorial =

Immemorial may refer to:

- Time immemorial
- Immemorial nobility
