= Foglesong =

Foglesong is a surname. Notable people with the surname include:

- Bobby Foglesong (born 1987), American soccer player
- Jim Foglesong (1922–2013), American country music producer and executive
- Richard Foglesong, American academic and writer
- Robert H. Foglesong (born 1945), United States Air Force general
