= Reedy Creek Improvement Act =

Florida law enacted in 1967

Florida Legislature
- Enacted by: Florida Legislature, 1967
- Enacted: May 12, 1967
- Signed by: Claude R. Kirk, Jr.
- Commenced: May 12, 1967
- Date of expiry: June 1, 2023
- Repealed: April 22, 2022

Repealed by
- Florida Senate Bill 4C (2022)

Summary
- An Act relating to the establishment, powers and functions of the Reedy Creek Improvement District; changing the name of the Reedy Creek Drainage District created under authority of Chapter 298, Florida Statutes, to the Reedy Creek Improvement District; setting forth new territorial boundaries of the District in Orange and Osceola Counties and excluding certain lands from said boundaries.
- Status: Repealed

The Reedy Creek Improvement Act, otherwise known as House Bill No. 486, was a law enacted in the U.S. state of Florida in 1967 establishing the area surrounding the Walt Disney World Resort (the Reedy Creek Improvement District) as its own county governmental authority, which granted it the same authority and responsibilities as a county government.

The bill, which was sought by and pushed for by Disney, was signed into law by Florida Governor Claude R. Kirk, Jr. on May 12, 1967, allowing Disney to build the infrastructure for the second park. Ground breaking followed on May 30. In Roy O. Disney's last act as the company's CEO in 1968, he officially named the second park Walt Disney World.

The status of the law has been challenged since its passage. In 1968, the Supreme Court of Florida ruled that the law did not violate any provision of the Constitution of Florida. Among the proposals that Disney lobbied to get the law passed was Walt Disney's vision of a real planned city within the property called the ''Experimental Prototype Community of Tomorrow" (EPCOT), which was intended to serve as a test bed for new city-living innovations. The company however eventually decided to abandon Walt's concepts for the experimental city after his death, primarily only using the district for its own commercial interests.

On April 22, 2022, amidst a dispute between Disney and Governor Ron DeSantis, the Reedy Creek Improvement Act was repealed, with the District itself set to dissolve in June 2023. Following concerns about the dissolution process, particularly the handling of the District's outstanding debt, the Act was effectively replaced in February 2023 by CS/HB 9-B, which retained the district (albeit with reduced powers), renamed it to the Central Florida Tourism Oversight District, and placed it under control of a Governor-appointed board.

== Background ==
When initially planning the resort back in the 1960s, Walt Disney felt that it would be easier to carry out his proposals with more flexibility and independence with his own specialized, personalized government. Among his ideas for his Florida project was his "Experimental Prototype Community of Tomorrow" (EPCOT), which was to be a real planned city that would have also been used as a test bed for new innovations for city living.

In an effort to lobby the Florida legislature to create the district, Walt Disney shot a 25-minute long film on October 27, 1966, two months before his death, in which he explained his plans for Disney World and how the EPCOT city would interrelate with other aspects of the property. In December 1966, a legislative hearing had been held on the law, where advocates for Disney and the company's law firm reportedly testified. Joe Potter, later a manager of the district, pushed for the legislation, as did Herb Gee, a Florida engineer. Walt Disney's EPCOT film was also screened for Florida legislators on February 2, 1967. These efforts were part of the Disney company's petitioning for the creation of the district, with the planned EPCOT city said to be part of this district.

== Provisions ==
The law created a special-purpose taxing district, known as the Reedy Creek Improvement District (RCID) which would have "same authority and responsibility" as a county government, including providing "essential" public services, such as firefighters and police. The RCID can also impose taxes and run government services from that revenue. The law also created two cities, the municipalities of Lake Buena Vista and Bay Lake which are currently within the boundary of Walt Disney World.

The 92-page law states that the district comprises nearly 25,000 acres in the counties of Osceola and Orange, with the primary landowner as the Walt Disney World Company. The law further says that the projects oriented toward recreation, economic development, and tourism within the boundaries of the district met a public purpose and would benefit "all properties, persons, and enterprises within the district." The law also states that the RCID will still be subject to Florida state laws that "guide its governance." The only areas where the district had to submit to the county and state would be property taxes and elevator inspections. The law also states that the governing body of the RCID, the board of supervisors, is chosen by the landowners inside the district, with Disney as the largest landowner in the district. According to Aubrey Jewett, a University of Central Florida political science professor, the law essentially gives Disney the "power of self-government" inside the defined district.

== Signature into law ==
On May 12, 1967, Governor Claude R. Kirk, Jr. signed the following statutes to implement Disney's plans, specifically Chapter 67-764 which created the Reedy Creek Improvement District; Chapter 67-1104 which established the City of Bay Lake; and Chapter 67-1965 which established the City of Reedy Creek (later renamed as the City of Lake Buena Vista around 1970). According to a press conference held in Winter Park, Florida on February 2, 1967, by Disney Vice President Donn Tatum, the Improvement District and Cities were created to serve "the needs of those residing there", because the company needed its own government to "clarify the District's authority to [provide services] within the District's limits", and because of the public nature of the planned development. The original city boundaries did not cover the whole Improvement District; they may have been intended as the areas where communities would be built for residential use.

== Aftermath ==
Walt Disney died in 1966 before realizing his vision for the planned EPCOT city and the rest of his initial plans for Disney World. With their biggest advocate gone, the Disney Company board eventually decided that it did not want to be in the business of running a city. Most of Walt's ideas for his planned city were eventually abandoned, and thus the residential areas were never built, causing some to cry foul. Most notably, Richard Foglesong argues in his book Married to the Mouse: Walt Disney World and Orlando that Disney has abused its powers by remaining in complete control of the district and using its autonomy solely for commercial interests inside its self-contained resort instead of maintaining an actual city. And although Disney built an actual community, Celebration, Florida, on their property in the 1990s, it was later de-annexed from the District and the company's control.

At the time of the RCID's creation, it was considered "remote and uninhabitable" but it changed over time. Currently, the RCID operates six-lane freeways in the Walt Disney World area near Orlando, Florida. Technically, the RCID is a public corporation administered by a five-member Board of Supervisors elected by area landowners. Disney is the primary landowner and controls the remaining land through contractual arrangements. In this way, the company is able to hand-pick the landowning electorate. An Associated Press article notes, "Board members are non-Disney business people from central Florida and must own at least an acre [4,000 m²] in the district." An Office of Program Policy Analysis and Government Accountability report explains the contractual arrangement as follows: "Historically, each board member has been deeded approximately five acres [20,000 m²] of land by an affiliate of the Walt Disney World Co. . . . According to RCID officials, a Walt Disney World Co. affiliate has the exclusive option to purchase land back from board members at any time."

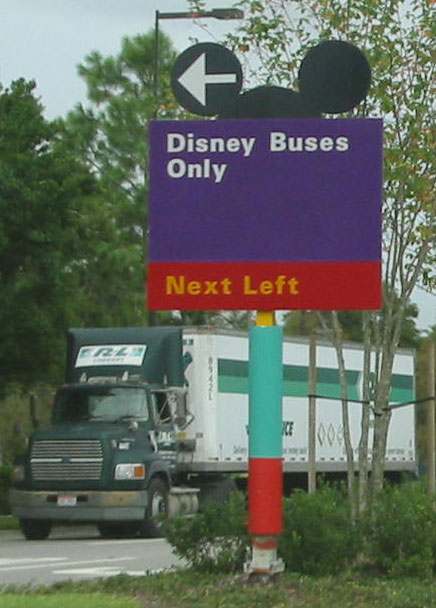
Typical sign in the Walt Disney World Resort, on Buena Vista Drive north, just past Hotel Plaza Boulevard, on August 15, 2003. This is on public property owned by the Reedy Creek Improvement District.

Financial arrangements are also circular. According to the RCID Finance Department, Walt Disney Co. is RCID's largest taxpayer, paying about 86% of the district's taxes in 2004. The remaining taxpayers are board members and lessees of property owned by Disney affiliates (e.g., House of Blues, Travelodge, and Hilton) paying ad valorem taxes. An American Prospect article notes, "Disney pays taxes to Reedy Creek, which gives the money straight back to Disney, and the circle is closed".

== Political and legal challenges ==
The status of the district and law have been challenged in the past. For instance, the Supreme Court of Florida ruled in the 1968 case State v. Reedy Creek Improvement District that the law did not violate any provision of the Constitution of Florida. In the 1980s, officials from Orange County, Florida, threatened legal action against Disney over the charter to RCID. However, the company and officials came to an agreement in 1989 whereby Disney paid $13 million for road improvement outside the property it owned while the county agreed to not challenge the charter of RCID until 1996. One official, Lou Treadway, a county commissioner, even described Disney as the largest taxpayer and employer in the county which causes "some of the greatest impact" in the county itself.

After Florida Governor Ron DeSantis signed Florida House Bill 1557 on March 28, 2022, Disney released a statement that its goal is for the law to be repealed or struck down. In a possible act of retaliation, DeSantis and Florida lawmakers threatened to repeal the Reedy Creek Improvement Act. These lawmakers include Spencer Roach, a Florida House Representative, who tweeted on March 30, 2022, that Florida legislators had held meetings to discuss repealing the law, arguing that the RCID should be under the jurisdiction of the Orange County, Florida, government rather than be self-governing. Roach also called RCID the "largest tax evasion scam in Florida history" and argued the district was opposed to "free markets". Their views were also echoed by U.S. representative Matt Gaetz, who called the company a "rodent."

Although a political analyst for News 6, Jim Clark, argued that the repeal of the law would be a "disaster" for Disney, Richard Foglesong, a former political science professor at Rollins College argued that it isn't "politically possible" to repeal the law. Roach later acknowledged that a bill to repeal the law would probably not be introduced until 2023 and described his call for repeal as "just an idea" he was discussing with fellow legislators in order to correct an "aberration of the free market". Anna Eskamani, who represents Orlando, Florida, argued that there hadn't been an "evidence-based analysis" on the impact of the RCID, and described calls for repeal as an action by DeSantis as indicating that those who challenge him "will be punished." She also called DeSantis' call for repeal "truly performative."

== Repeal ==
On April 19, 2022, Republican Representative Randy Fine and Republican Senator Jennifer Bradley filed identical bills that would dissolve any "special independent district" established before the November 5, 1968, ratification of the Constitution of Florida, with dissolution occurring on June 1, 2023, while any districts that wanted to be re-established could do so using existing legal procedures. On April 20, 2022, the Florida State Senate passed the bill by a vote of 23–16 and sent it to the Florida House of Representatives for approval.

Roach, who voiced the idea of the ending the RCID, said he was surprised by the decision of DeSantis to extend the legislature's special session to consider bills on "special districts like Reedy Creek" and argued that he wasn't "just saber-rattling." The Florida House of Representatives voted to pass the repeal bill the next day by a vote of 70–38. On April 22, DeSantis signed the bill into law, declaring at a press conference that "we have everything thought out" and that Disney would pay "more taxes" as a result of the repeal effort.

The Associated Press reported that DeSantis used the repeal effort as part of a campaign fundraising email. The South Florida Sun Sentinel reported that Fine has a love-hate relationship with Disney, noting that after Walt Disney World re-opened after COVID-19 shutdowns in Florida, he described the theme park as an "engine of our economy."

Fine, who originally proposed the repeal, argued that the bill to dissolve the RCID is not a form of retaliation for Disney's position on Florida House Bill 1557, saying that "when Disney kicked the hornet’s nest, we looked at special districts" and argued that Disney does not need "special privileges" in Florida. He also declared that the repeal effort reminds Disney they are "a guest in Florida" and said that it is "fundamentally unfair" to give Disney advantages over other tourist areas.

=== Opposition ===
National and state political officials opposed the law's repeal. Florida Senator Tina Polsky argued that Disney is being "attacked" for expressing support for its LGBTQ customers and employees, asking whether this decision is being made "based on spite." Another Florida Senator, Loranne Ausley, questioned the need for a special session on the bill, arguing it adds "insult to injury" and goes "after a private business," further arguing that Disney has made Florida "what it is." Florida Senator Linda Stewart stated that the repeal effort doesn't make sense and predicted that it is an issue that won't be "very successful" while Jason Pizzo, a Florida State Senator, predicted that "nothing is going to happen" in regard to taking away Disney's legal privileges. Eskamani also opposed the repeal, and congressional redistricting efforts, arguing that both are anti-democratic.

Florida State Senator Jeff Brandes voted with Democrats on the repeal measure. Charlie Crist, a U.S. representative and candidate for the Democratic Party's nomination in the 2022 Florida gubernatorial election, also opposed the measure, arguing that it will hurt the state's economy and tourism. Florida Representative Joseph Geller argued that the effort was "disrespectful of the legislative process." Rich Templin of the AFL–CIO, who represents tens of thousands of union members working in the RCID, criticized the measure, even testifying against it while it was being debated in the legislature. Florida Representatives Michele Rayner and Carlos Guillermo Smith argued against the repeal, saying it indicates "political ambition" and is a form of "unhinged authoritarianism."

The mayor of Orange County, Jerry Demings, spoke out against the repeal of the law, saying that the legislature had not "adequately contemplated the ramifications" and said it would put an "undue burden" on taxpayers. Scott Maxwell of the Orlando Sentinel said that repeal effort is hypocritical because those supporting it are the "same ones" who granted "special favors" and treatment for Disney in 2021. He noted that Universal Orlando continues to receive "perks" while legislators work to take away privileges from Disney.

Jared Polis, the governor of Colorado, also opposed the repeal, saying he would welcome Disney if they left Florida and moved to Colorado. The senior chairman of Goldman Sachs, Lloyd Blankfein, argued that revoking Disney's special status due to the company's objecting to DeSantis' view on Florida House Bill 1557 represents a form of government retaliation for "exercising free speech." He also said it is a "bad look for a conservative." Jenna Ellis, former member of an "elite strike force team" that made efforts to overturn Joe Biden's victory in the 2020 presidential election, criticized the effort, calling it "misguided" and arguing that Disney has the "right to speak" and take a position on whether to support or oppose legislation "without government consequences."

On April 21, President Joe Biden criticized DeSantis and the Republican Party at a Portland, Oregon, event, arguing that "the Far Right has taken over that party" and argued that the Republican Party is "going after Mickey Mouse." Additionally, the White House Deputy Press Secretary, Karine Jean-Pierre, stated that the White House opposes DeSantis "taking action against a company" for their opposition to Florida House Bill 1557.

=== Impact ===
Before the repeal bill passed, The Wall Street Journal reported that losing the district would cost Disney "tens of millions of dollars per year." Another article in the same publication said that the law would be a "blow to Disney’s operations in Florida" as it exempts the company, and more specifically the RCID, from building, wastewater, and environmental regulations, giving the company the flexibility to run and expand Walt Disney World. James Clark, senior lecturer at University of Central Florida who specializes in the history of Florida, the American South, and the presidency, argued that if the Reedy Creek Improvement Act is repealed then counties "will be the big losers" from the bill and said that DeSantis is the only "clear winner" of the repeal effort.

Officials within Florida warn that dissolving the RCID could burden residents in neighboring counties with higher property taxes. Democrats in the Florida legislature argued that the repeal proposal is retaliation against Disney, and argued that local homeowners could have higher tax bills if bond debt from Disney is absorbed by the appropriate Florida counties. Similarly, Scott Maxwell of the Orlando Sentinel stated that the repeal effort and calling out Disney were meant to send a message to the big donors of the Republican Party that if they want favors they should keep quiet and keep giving the party campaign funds.

Florida representative Fentrice Driskell argued that the bill would impose tax burdens on Orange and Osceola counties in the "billions of dollars." The Miami Herald estimated that those in Orange and Osceola counties may "inherit over $1 billion of debt owed by Disney." The tax collector of Orange County, Scott Randolph, stated that dissolving the RCID would cost the county "$163 million per year" for debt payments and services.

However, Reuters and CNN stated that it is unclear how the repeal effort will financially impact Disney or the area as a whole. Even so, Vanity Fair argued that removing the special privileges for Disney has "huge potential consequences for local governments" and those who live around the Disney World amusement park. A business journalist for Sky News, Ian King, argued that the repeal effort "may backfire", possibly deterring companies from moving to Florida if they think they "will be punished for speaking out" and said the perception is that the repeal effort is punishing Disney for opposing the 'Don't Say Gay' law.

The government of Osceola County announced on April 21 that they would begin an analysis to understand the impacts of the dissolution of the RCID, including "any shifts in cost to Osceola as a result" and argued that Disney had been a "strong community partner" over the years. Before the passage of the bill, the Florida House of Representatives published a five-page analysis of the impacts of the RCID's dissolution. They concluded that although the law doesn't seem to have a "fiscal impact of state government," it will eliminate expenditures and revenues of "certain special districts," and transfer any liabilities and assets to local governments.

On April 22, the rating agency Fitch Ratings, put the RCID on a "negative watch", stating there was a "lack of clarity" as to how the liabilities and assets of the RCID would be distributed after the district's dissolution, meaning that the credit ratings of the district "could be downgraded". Fitch stated that this could be changed only if the plan to dissolve the district "preserves the credit quality and payment capacity of the respective revenue streams pledged to bondholders".

== Use in popular culture ==
- In an essay by Carl Hiaasen for his 1998 non-fiction book, Team Rodent, one of the essays, entitled "Republic of Walt", examines the Reedy Creek Improvement District, noting that the district has been granted unprecedented levels of autonomy, including control over its own utilities, tax levies, municipal codes, and police and fire departments.

== See also ==
- List of incidents at Walt Disney World (occasionally mentions RCID)
- Timeline of the Walt Disney Company
