= Duke of Norfolk's Case =

1682 Judgment of the House of Lords

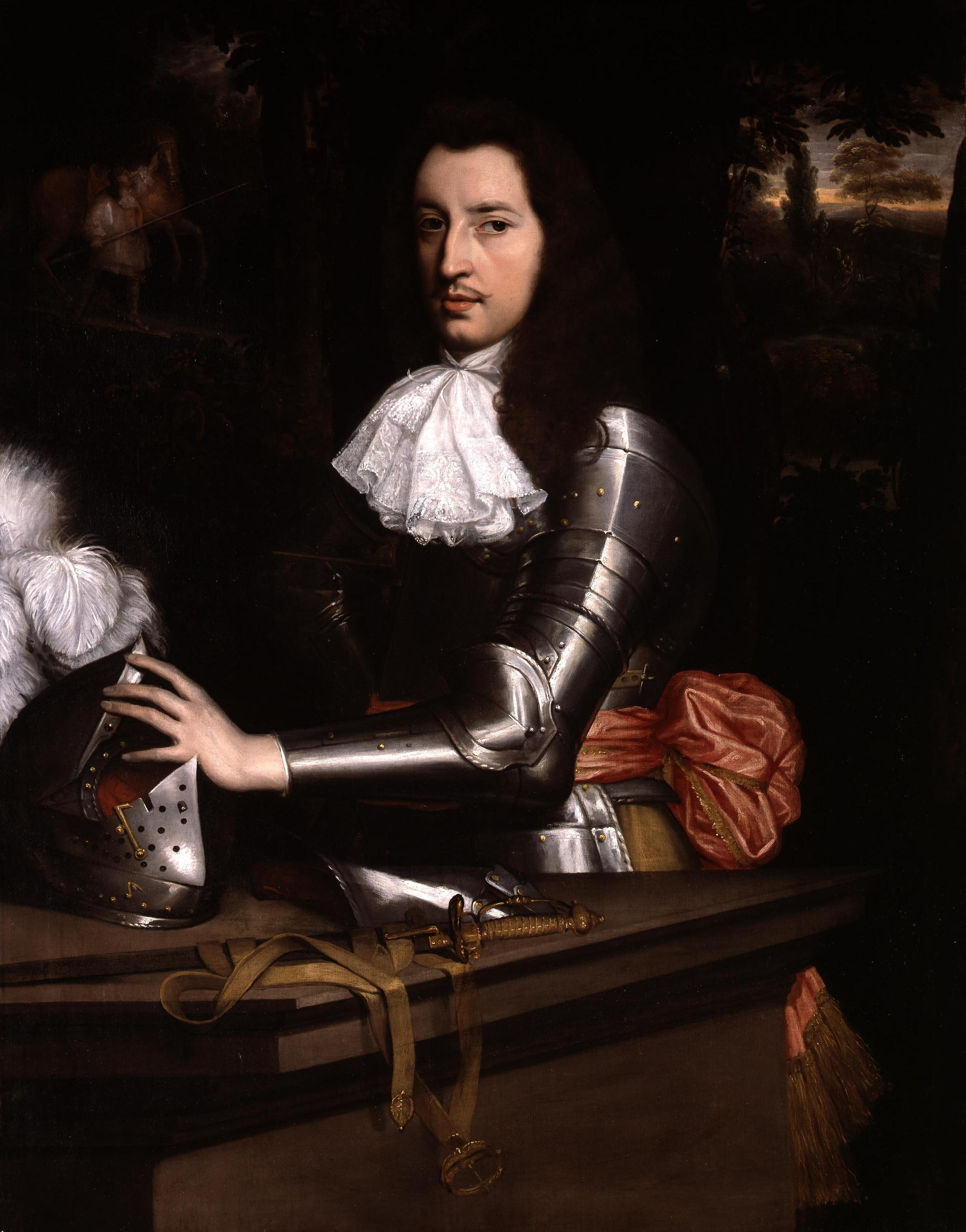
- The 6th Duke of Norfolk
- Court: High Court of Justice (Chancery Division)
- Decided: 26 February 1677
- Citations: (1682) 3 Ch Cas 1; 22 ER 931
- Transcript: UNISET

Court membership
- Judge sitting: Lord Nottingham LC

Keywords
- Perpetuities and accumulations; Rule against perpetuities

Duke of Norfolk's Case (1682) 3 Ch Cas 1; 22 ER 931 is an important legal judgment of the House of Lords that established the common law rule against perpetuities. The case related to establishing inheritance for grandchildren of Henry Howard, 22nd Earl of Arundel including grandchildren who were not yet born.

== Facts of the case ==
In the case, the Earl of Arundel tried to create a shifting executory limitation so that some of his property would pass to his eldest son, Thomas (who was mentally deficient), and then to his second son, Henry. Henry would at first receive other property, but that would pass to the fourth son, Charles, if Henry succeeded to Thomas's property. The estate plan also included provisions for shifting the property many generations later if certain conditions should occur.

When Henry, by then the 6th Duke of Norfolk, succeeded to Thomas's property, he did not want to pass the other property to Charles. Charles sued to enforce his interest, and the House of Lords held that such a shifting condition could not exist indefinitely. The judges believed that tying up property too long beyond the lives of people living at the time was wrong, although the exact period was not determined until Cadell v. Palmer (1833), 150 years later.

== Rule in the case ==
The rule against perpetuities is closely related to another doctrine in the common law of property, the rule against unreasonable restraints on alienation. Both stem from an underlying principle or reference in the common law disapproving of restraints on property rights.

However, while a violation of the rule against perpetuities is also a violation of the rule against unreasonable restraints on alienation, the reciprocal is not true. As one has stated, "The rule against perpetuities is an ancient, but still vital, rule of property law intended to enhance marketability of property interests by limiting remoteness of vesting."

The rule has been recognized in some jurisdictions in the United States in Wedel v. American Elec. Power Service Corp. In the United States, the law favors the vesting of estates as early as possible, as the provisions of the rule are predicated upon "public policy" and thus "constitute non-waivable, legal prohibitions, and in Australia through statute.
