= Bay Lake, Florida =

City in Florida, US

- City
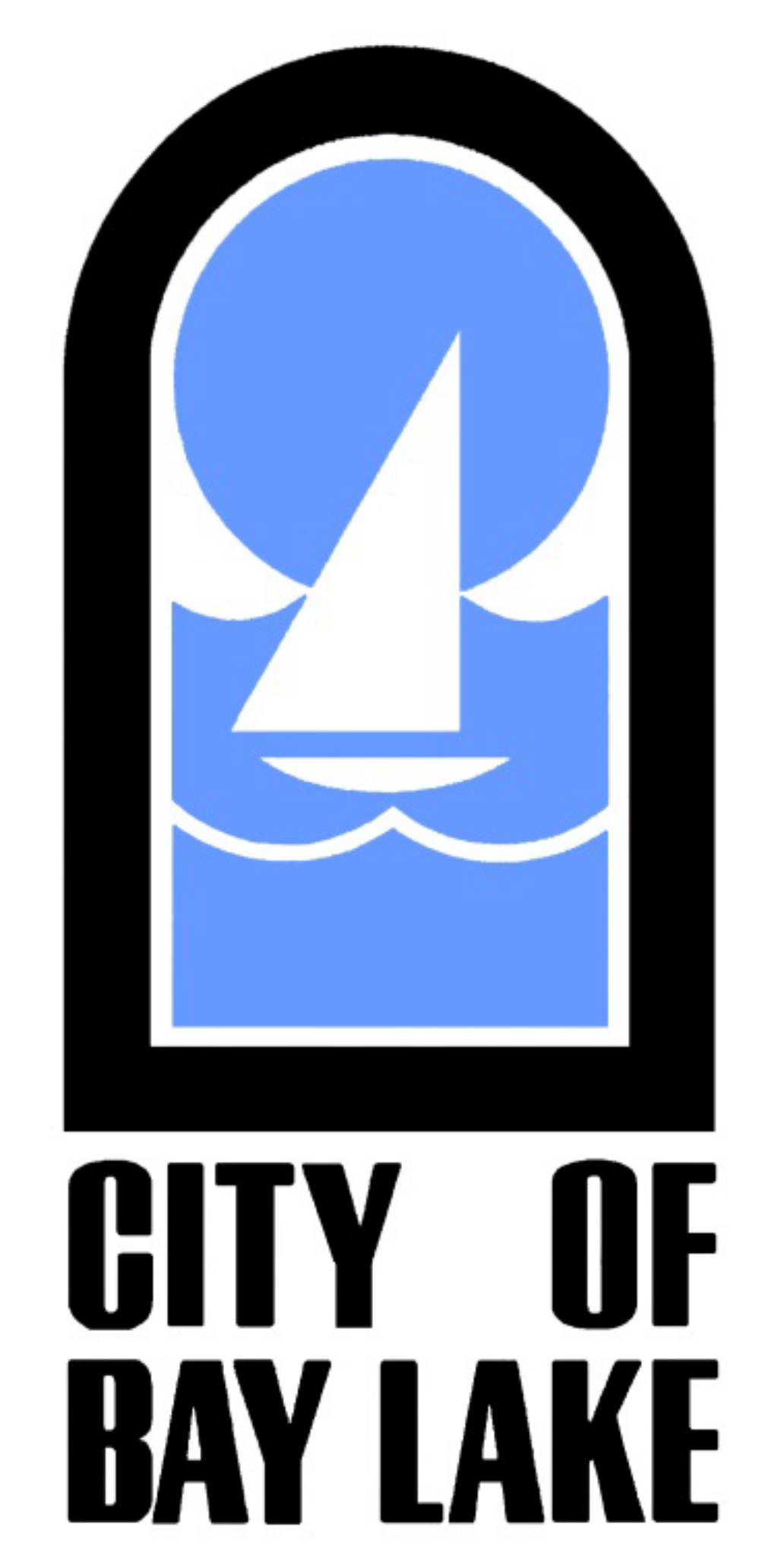
- Seal

- Location of Bay Lake in Orange County, Florida.

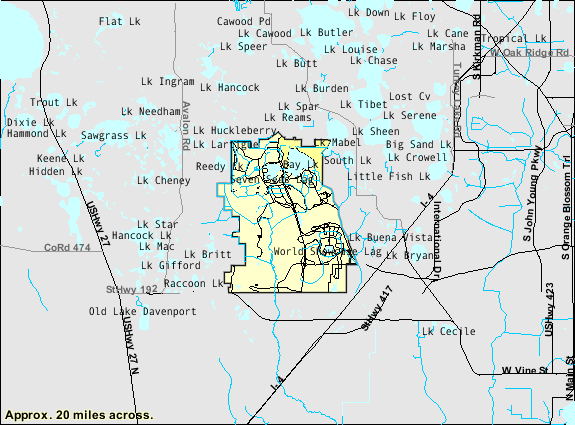
- U.S. Census Map
- Coordinates: 28°22′44″N 81°35′41″W
- Country: United States
- State: Florida
- County: Orange
- Incorporated: May 12, 1967
- Named after: Bay Lake

Government
  - Type: Council-Manager
  - Mayor: Todd Watzel
  - Mayor Pro Tem: Tanya Peak-Smith
  - Council Members: Sue McCall, Bryan Swartz, and Tim Burns
  - City Manager: Randy Singh
  - City Clerk: Amy T. Iennaco

Area
  - Total: 22.73 sq mi (58.88 km^{2})
  - Land: 21.51 sq mi (55.70 km^{2})
  - Water: 1.23 sq mi (3.18 km^{2})
- Elevation: 89 ft (27 m)

Population (2020)
  - Total: 29
  - Density: 1.3/sq mi (0.52/km^{2})
- Time zone: UTC-5 (Eastern (EST))
  - Summer (DST): UTC-4 (EDT)
- ZIP code: 32830
- Area codes: 407, 689
- FIPS code: 12-04150
- GNIS feature ID: 2403824
- Website: cityofbaylakefl.gov

Bay Lake is a city in Orange County, Florida, United States. The population was 29 at the 2020 census. It is named after a lake that lies east of Magic Kingdom. All four of the Walt Disney World Resort theme parks, and one of Walt Disney World's two water parks, are in Bay Lake, though all Disney parks in the region have mailing addresses in nearby Lake Buena Vista.

Bay Lake is one of two Florida municipalities inside the Central Florida Tourism Oversight District (formerly the Reedy Creek Improvement District) which also includes Walt Disney World, the other being Lake Buena Vista. Bay Lake is part of the Orlando–Kissimmee–Sanford Metropolitan Statistical Area.

Permanent residents of Bay Lake are employees of Disney and those of the district, as well as former employees of either entity who have retired, and members of families of any of those categories.

== History ==
Chapter 67-1104 of the Laws of Florida, incorporating the City of Bay Lake, was signed into law by Governor Claude R. Kirk, Jr. on May 12, 1967, the same day he also signed chapters 67-764 (creating the Reedy Creek Improvement District, or RCID), also known as the Reedy Creek Improvement Act, and 67-1965 (incorporating the City of Reedy Creek). It was and still is located fully inside the RCID, and all its duties have been taken care of by the RCID. As fully described in Reedy Creek Improvement District, the city has always been controlled by the Walt Disney Company and has allowed them powers that other area attractions have not had.

Chapter 69-836 of the Laws of Florida, which became a law on July 3, 1969, without the governor's approval, redefined the city boundaries to exclude the easternmost part of Bay Lake. 69–1527, which became a law the same day, completely moved the city of Reedy Creek, with the land given up by Bay Lake included in the new city. Since then, Bay Lake has expanded to fill the original RCID west of Bonnet Creek, but the Reedy Creek Improvement District has expanded to include new land not in the city.

The RCID had all the powers of the city and more, raising the question of why cities were incorporated inside of it. Walt Disney's original plans for the site included at least one futuristic living area, a planned "community of the future". This was never built, but some of the ideas were incorporated into the EPCOT theme park. The later Celebration, Florida was deannexed from the city and the RCID in 1994 so the Walt Disney Company would not lose control of the district. The city is exclusively inhabited by Disney employees and their immediate families, residing in a community on the north shore of Bay Lake (on Bay Court). The only landowners are wholly owned subsidiaries of The Walt Disney Company, rights-of-way for state and county roads, and five five-acre (2.0 ha) parcels owned by senior Disney employees to grant them voting power in the Reedy Creek Improvement District.

== Geography ==
According to the United States Census Bureau, the city has a total area of 22.8 square miles (59.1 km^{2}), of which 21.5 square miles (55.7 km^{2}) is land and 1.4 square miles (3.5 km^{2}) (5.86%) is water.

The principal border that divides the cities of Lake Buena Vista to the east and Bay Lake to the west is the canal called Bonnet Creek, adjacent to Bonnet Creek Parkway. Most of the attractions associated with the Walt Disney World Resort are actually located within the City of Bay Lake, including all four theme parks.

The only long-term residents in Bay Lake live in a mobile home park on Bay Court, a street which, in 1987, was a dirt road. As of that year many employees wished to live in Bay Lake or Lake Buena Vista due to their proximity to their jobs.

=== Climate ===
The climate in this area is characterized by hot, humid summers and generally mild winters. According to the Köppen climate classification, the City of Bay Lake has a humid subtropical climate zone (Cfa).

Climate data for Bay Lake, Florida
| Month | Jan | Feb | Mar | Apr | May | Jun | Jul | Aug | Sep | Oct | Nov | Dec | Year |
|---|---|---|---|---|---|---|---|---|---|---|---|---|---|
| Record high °F (°C) | 86 (30) | 89 (32) | 90 (32) | 95 (35) | 100 (38) | 100 (38) | 99 (37) | 100 (38) | 98 (37) | 95 (35) | 89 (32) | 90 (32) | 100 (38) |
| Mean daily maximum °F (°C) | 71 (22) | 74 (23) | 78 (26) | 83 (28) | 87 (31) | 90 (32) | 91 (33) | 91 (33) | 89 (32) | 84 (29) | 78 (26) | 73 (23) | 82 (28) |
| Mean daily minimum °F (°C) | 49 (9) | 52 (11) | 55 (13) | 61 (16) | 67 (19) | 72 (22) | 74 (23) | 74 (23) | 73 (23) | 66 (19) | 58 (14) | 52 (11) | 63 (17) |
| Record low °F (°C) | 19 (−7) | 29 (−2) | 25 (−4) | 38 (3) | 51 (11) | 53 (12) | 64 (18) | 65 (18) | 57 (14) | 44 (7) | 32 (0) | 20 (−7) | 19 (−7) |
| Average precipitation inches (mm) | 2.56 (65) | 2.31 (59) | 3.17 (81) | 2.60 (66) | 3.54 (90) | 8.03 (204) | 7.57 (192) | 8.06 (205) | 7.32 (186) | 3.66 (93) | 2.01 (51) | 2.32 (59) | 53.15 (1,350) |

== Demographics ==
Historical population
| Census | Pop. | Note | %± |
|---|---|---|---|
| 1970 | 24 | | — |
| 1980 | 74 | | 208.3% |
| 1990 | 24 | | −67.6% |
| 2000 | 23 | | −4.2% |
| 2010 | 47 | | 104.3% |
| 2020 | 29 | | −38.3% |
U.S. Decennial Census

=== 2010 and 2020 census ===
Bay Lake racial composition (Hispanics excluded from racial categories) (NH = Non-Hispanic)
| Race | Pop 2010 | Pop 2020 | % 2010 | % 2020 |
|---|---|---|---|---|
| White (NH) | 34 | 13 | 72.34% | 44.83% |
| Black or African American (NH) | 0 | 0 | 0.00% | 0.00% |
| Native American or Alaska Native (NH) | 0 | 0 | 0.00% | 0.00% |
| Asian (NH) | 3 | 0 | 6.38% | 0.00% |
| Pacific Islander or Native Hawaiian (NH) | 0 | 0 | 0.00% | 0.00% |
| Some other race (NH) | 0 | 3 | 0.00% | 10.34% |
| Two or more races/Multiracial (NH) | 2 | 6 | 4.26% | 20.69% |
| Hispanic or Latino (any race) | 8 | 7 | 17.02% | 24.14% |
| Total | 47 | 29 | 100.00% | 100.00% |

As of the 2020 United States census, there were 29 people, 20 households, and 4 families residing in the city.

As of the 2010 United States census, there were 47 people, 6 households, and 4 families residing in the city.

=== 2000 census ===
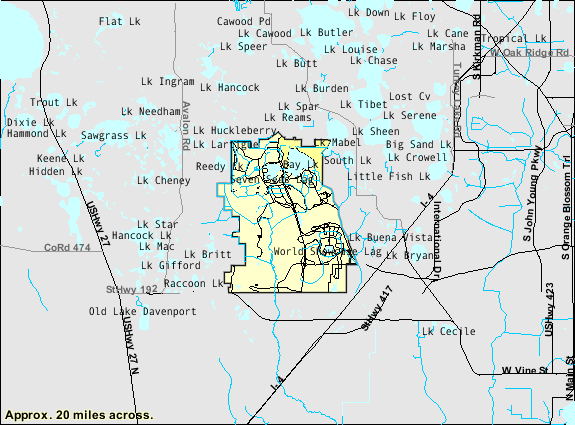
U.S. Census Bureau map showing city limits

As of the census of 2000, there were 23 people, 9 households, and 6 families residing in the city. The population density was 1.2 inhabitants per square mile (0.4/km^{2}). There were 9 housing units at an average density of 0.5 per square mile (0.2/km^{2}). The racial makeup of the city was twenty-two whites (95.7%) and one African American (4.3%). None of the people in Bay Lake were Asian, Native American, Pacific Islanders, other races, multiracial people, or Hispanics or Latinos.

In 2000, there were nine households in Bay Lake, out of which three had children under the age of 18 living with them, five had married couples living together, one had a female householder with no husband present, and three of the households were non-families. Three households were made up of individuals, and one consisted of someone living alone who was 65 years of age or older. The average household size was 2.56 and the average family size was 3.00.

In 2000, the median income for a household in the city was $86,288, and the median income for a family was $86,288. Males had a median income of $76,284 versus $21,667 for females. The per capita income for the city was $26,731. None of the population and none of the families were below the poverty line.

Because of Bay Lake statistics, legislators have to be careful not to use the words "maximum" and "average" in the computations used for the State of Florida's 2007 property tax reform debate. For example, in 2006, the "per capita levy" of property tax in Bay Lake was $176,230. Since the statewide average that year was $475, legislators have had to be careful to distinguish the phrase "average savings" from the phrase "savings by the average taxpayer."

== Points of interest ==
- Walt Disney World:
  - Magic Kingdom
  - EPCOT
  - Disney's Hollywood Studios
  - Disney's Animal Kingdom
  - Disney's Blizzard Beach
  - Disney's Fort Wilderness Resort & Campground
  - Disney's Wilderness Lodge
  - Disney's Magnolia and Palm Golf Courses
  - Shades of Green
  - Disney's BoardWalk
  - Disney's Animal Kingdom Lodge
  - Flamingo Crossings

== Government and infrastructure ==
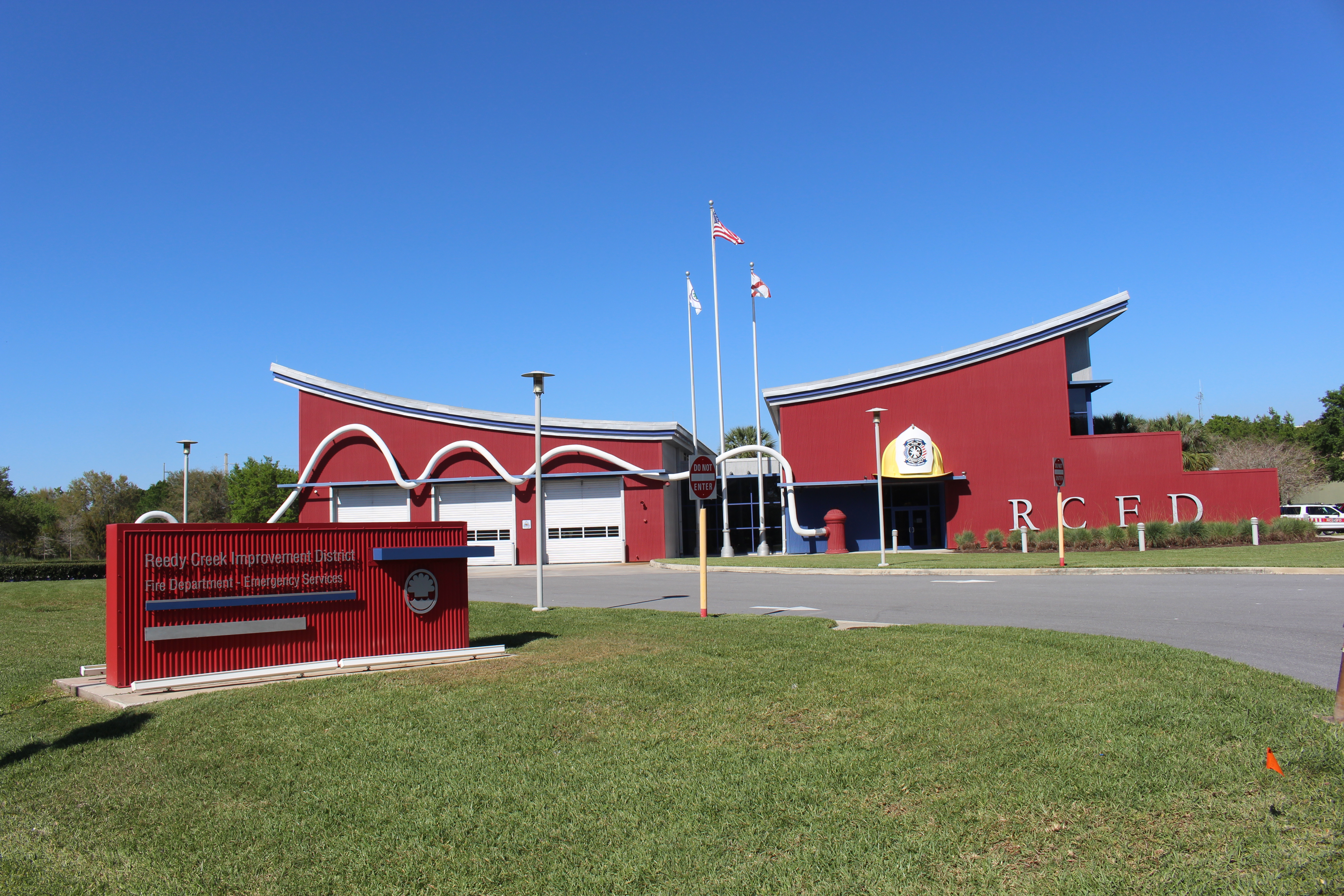
Reedy Creek Improvement District Fire Department Emergency Services fire station

The Central Florida Tourism Oversight District has its Fire Department Emergency Services station in Bay Lake (it has a Lake Buena Vista postal address).

== Education ==
Residents of Bay Lake (Bay Court) are zoned to schools in the Orange County Public Schools:

- Castleview Elementary School - It opened in 2019.
- Horizon West Middle School - It opened in 2019.
- Windermere High School

Former school zoning:

- Bay Lake Elementary School
  - It opened in 2016, relieving Horizon West area elementary schools and making it one of three schools to open that year in the county. Myrlene Kimble was the school's first principal. The 94,279-square-foot (8,758.8 m^{2}) building, with a capacity of 837 students, is on a 15-acre (6.1 ha) property. In fall 2016 it had 785 students. Its design is similar to that of Independence Elementary School.
- Bridgewater Middle School
- Windermere High School

Formerly it was zoned to the following:

- Independence Elementary School (prior to 2016)
- Windermere Elementary School
- Lakeview Middle School
- West Orange High School (prior to 2017)
