= Royal lives clause =

Common law contract clause

A royal lives clause is a contract clause which provides that a certain right must be exercised within a certain period related to the lifetime of a currently living member of a royal family. Specifically, the clause usually specifies that the contract is in effect until 21 years after someone's death; the person indicated is whoever dies last out of all of the currently living descendants of a specified monarch.

== Form ==
A sample clause might read:

The option must be exercised before the end of the period ending 21 years after the death of the last survivor of all the lineal descendants of His Majesty King Charles III who have been born before the date of this agreement.

== Rationale ==
The clause became part of contractual drafting in response to common law rule developed by the courts known as the rule against perpetuities. (Note: The rule originated in the Duke of Norfolk's Case (1682) 3 Ch Cas 1, 22 ER 931. Henry, Earl of Arundel (later the Duke of Norfolk) had tried to create a shifting executory limitation so that some of his property would pass to his eldest son (who was mentally deficient) and then to his second son, and other property would pass to his second son, but then to his fourth son. The estate plan also included provisions for shifting the property many generations later, if certain conditions should occur. When his second son, Henry, succeeded to his older brother's property, he did not want to pass the other property to his younger brother, Charles. Charles sued to enforce his interest, and the House of Lords held that such a shifting condition could not exist indefinitely. The judges believed that tying up property too long beyond the lives of people living at the time was wrong, although the exact period was not determined until another case, Cadell v. Palmer (1833) 1 Cl. & Fin. 372, 6 ER 936, a full 150 years later.) That rule provided that any future disposition of property must vest within "a life in being plus 21 years". The rule generally affects two types of transactions: trusts and options to acquire property. Generally speaking, such transfers must vest before the end of the maximum period, or the grant will be void. Under the old common law, a transaction would be void even if the property might possibly vest after the end of the maximum period, though now most jurisdictions have, by statute, adopted "wait and see" laws.

In an attempt to mitigate the perceived harshness of the common law rule, and to maximise the possible length of time for which trusts in particular could subsist, lawyers began to draft so-called royal lives clauses. Royal lives were chosen because (a) it was assumed that being affluent, at least one or two members of the family could be assumed to live a reasonably long period of time, and (b) being royalty, the descendants would have reasonably ascertainable lives. In practice, a dead monarch was usually chosen so as to maximise the possibility of a grandchild or great-grandchild who would be outside of the immediate royal family having recently been born. (Note: For example, if one were to have used a Royal lives clause in summer 2007 using Queen Elizabeth II, her youngest descendant at that time would have been Lady Louise Windsor, who was three years old, and the pool would be limited to seven grandchildren who might conceivably all die in wars, accidents or of disease at an early stage. But by choosing the deceased King George V there would be a much larger number of younger Royal descendants, the youngest of whom at that time was Xan Windsor, Lord Culloden, born on 12 March 2007, a grandson of the concurrent Duke of Gloucester.)

== Application ==
The royal lives clause is a common legal practice in several Commonwealth countries. In the Canadian province of Alberta, royal lives clauses are routinely used in commercial oil and gas operating agreements.

However, in the United Kingdom, the significance of the royal lives clause may have diminished as a result of the Perpetuities and Accumulations Act 1964, a legal act that reformed the rules against perpetuities in the country. Similar reforms were also made in several Australian states and the Canadian province of British Columbia.

=== Outside the Commonwealth ===
The royal lives clause has also been used outside the Commonwealth. An agreement between the Reedy Creek Improvement District and Walt Disney Parks and Resorts in Florida, United States, includes a royal lives clause, with "King Charles III, king of England"[sic] and his descendants being the referenced royal lives in the agreement.

== Equivalent practices ==
In the United States, president's lives clauses are used as well as royal lives clauses, and for similar reasons; well-documented political and industrial families (such as the Kennedys and Rockefellers) are also used. In Ireland, the descendants of Éamon de Valera are sometimes used.

== See also ==
- Line of succession to the British Throne
- Time immemorial
