= Henry G. Freeman Jr. Pin Money Fund =

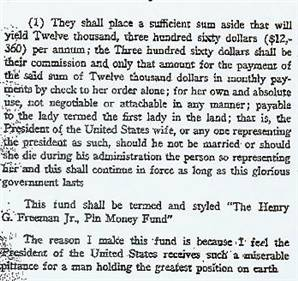
Excerpt of Henry G. Freeman Jr.'s will establishing the Henry G. Freeman Jr. Pin Money Fund.

The Henry G. Freeman Jr. Pin Money Fund was the operating name of an annuity fund of the Henry G. Freeman Jr. Trust, benefiting the first ladies of the United States. The fund was established as part of the will (written in 1912) of Henry G. Freeman Jr., a prominent Philadelphia real estate developer.

Freeman believed that the president of the United States was paid a "miserable pittance", and that a way of increasing his income while avoiding the appearance of political gifts was to institute an annuity of $12,000 per year ($302,000 in today's dollars) to be paid "to the lady termed the first lady in the land; that is, the President of the United States [sic] wife, or anyone representing the president as such, should he not be married or should she die during his administration." Freeman's will specified that the money be for the first lady's "own and absolute use" and the payments "shall continue in force as long as this glorious government exists."

Freeman died in 1917, but the fund did not take effect immediately. The fund came to public knowledge in 1931, when Freeman's son died. A contemporary newspaper report stated that "legal experts" were divided as to whether the First Ladies' annuity would begin at that time, whether it would have to wait for Freeman's other annuity beneficiaries to die, or whether it would be altogether invalid under the rule against perpetuities. In the event, no first ladies actually received any funds until all Freeman's descendants had died.

The fund became active in November 1989 during the administration of George H. W. Bush, but due to a court dispute the first payments were not made until December 1992. Barbara Bush received $36,000 retroactively and donated a portion to her charity work, and spent an unspecified amount doing "something nice for my grandchildren." First Lady Hillary Clinton and First Lady Laura Bush donated the payments to charity. The income was taxable, and the fund was overseen by Wells Fargo Bank.

When Michelle Obama was First Lady, she received payments under the fund in 2009 and 2010. But the trustees at Wells Fargo Bank were apparently concerned that the fund violated the rule against perpetuities as it was when Freeman died, which restricted most trusts from lasting more than 21 years beyond the life of a then-living person; the year 2010 marked 21 years since the death of Freeman's last descendant. As a result, Michelle Obama relinquished her interest and directed the trustees to disburse the remainder of the fund to charities designated in Freeman's will. From the Obamas' 2011 tax return, the publicly released tax returns of the President and First Lady no longer listed the Freeman fund as a source of income.
