= Perpetuities and Accumulations Act 2009 =

Act of the Parliament of the United Kingdom

Perpetuities and Accumulations Act 2009 (Note: Section 24.)
- Act of Parliament
- Parliament of the United Kingdom
- Long title: An Act to amend the law relating to the avoidance of future interests on grounds of remoteness and the law relating to accumulations of income.
- Citation: 2009 c. 18
- Introduced by: Bridget Prentice MP, Parliamentary Under-Secretary of State for Justice (Commons); Lord Bach (Lords)
- Territorial extent: England and Wales (Note: Section 23.)

Dates
- Royal assent: 12 November 2009
- Commencement: 12 November 2009 (sections 22–24); 6 April 2010 (rest of act); (Note: Section 22. The Perpetuities and Accumulations Act 2009 (Commencement) Order 2010 (SI 2010/37).)

Status: Current legislation

History of passage through Parliament

Text of statute as originally enacted

Text of the Perpetuities and Accumulations Act 2009 as in force today (including any amendments) within the United Kingdom, from legislation.gov.uk.

The Perpetuities and Accumulations Act 2009 (c. 18) is an act of the Parliament of the United Kingdom that reforms the rule against perpetuities and the law relating to accumulations of income in trusts.

The act resulted from a Law Commission report published in 1998. It abolishes the rule against perpetuities in most non-trust contexts, such as easements. In relation to wills, however, the Act only applies to wills drawn up after 6 April 2010. A will drawn up before 6 April but executed later (upon the death of the testator) will continue to be bound by prior rules.

== Commencement ==
Sections 22 to 24 came into force on 12 November 2009

Sections 1 to 21 and the schedule came into force on 6 April 2010.

== See also ==
- Perpetuities and Accumulations Act 1964

== Bibliography ==
- "Perpetuities and Accumulations Act 2009". Current Law Statutes Annotated 2009. Sweet & Maxwell. Thomson Reuters. 2010. Volume 1. Chapter 18. pp 18-1 to 18-10.
- Meadway, Susannah (2010). "Perpetuities and Accumulations Act 2009". Trusts & Trustees. 16 (4): 240–246. doi:10.1093/tandt/ttq016.
- MacKenzie and Phillips. "The Perpetuities and Accumulations Act 2009". Textbook on Land Law. Chapter 19.6. Thirteenth Edition. Oxford University Press. 2010. p 373 et seq.
