= EPCOT (concept) =

Unfinished concept for a planned community

The city's central commercial areas and Cosmopolitan Hotel. Concept art by Herbert Ryman.

Overlay of the 1966 plans for EPCOT (orange) and contemporary situation (blue)

The Experimental Prototype Community of Tomorrow (EPCOT) was an unfinished concept for a planned community, intended to sit on a swath of undeveloped land near Orlando, Florida. It was created by Walt Disney in collaboration with the designers at WED Enterprises which would later become Walt Disney Imagineering. Based on ideas stemming from modernism and futurism, and inspired by architectural literature about city planning, Disney intended EPCOT to be a utopian autocratic company town, although he struggled to somehow include residents in community governance. One of the primary stated aims of EPCOT was to replace urban sprawl as the organizing force of community planning in the United States in the 1960s. Disney intended EPCOT to be a real city, and it was planned to feature commercial, residential, industrial, and recreational centers, connected by a mass multimodal transportation system, that would, he said, "Never cease to be a living blueprint of the future".

Following Disney's death in 1966, EPCOT plans were shelved. In 1971, Walt Disney World emerged, with Epcot opening in 1982 as a theme park and influencing the nearby community of Celebration, Florida. Elements from the original EPCOT vision endured, shaping aspects of the modern Disney World park, such as the monorail system and the utilidor system.

== History ==
EPCOT will take its cue from the new ideas and new and futuristic technologies that are now emerging from the creative centers of American industry. It will be a community of tomorrow that will never be completed but will always be introducing, testing, and demonstrating new materials and systems. And EPCOT will always be a showcase to the world for the ingenuity and imagination of American free enterprise. — Walt Disney, describing the genesis of EPCOT

Forerunners of Disney's EPCOT plan include Tomorrowland in Disneyland, which already featured monorails and PeopleMovers, and the Monsanto House of the Future (1957), which was designed by architects from the Massachusetts Institute of Technology. Architect/planner Victor Gruen's plans to convert the site of the 1964–1965 New York World's Fair was also a significant influence on EPCOT, Disney Imagineer Marty Sklar said. Concerned with the "urban crisis" of the time, which he believed was one of the biggest problems facing society, Disney also consulted urban planning literature, including books by Ebenezer Howard, founder of the architectural "garden city movement", and Victor Gruen.

=== Location ===
Numerous locations were proposed for EPCOT, including St. Louis, Niagara Falls, Washington, D.C., New Jersey, and New York City's World Fair site. Disney also considered incorporating an experimental city into his plans for a Palm Beach, Florida development with RCA and investor John D. MacArthur in 1959. Eventually, Central Florida was chosen. Commenting on the choice, Disney said, "Here in Florida we've enjoyed something that we've never enjoyed at Disneyland: a blessing of size. There's enough land here to hold all the ideas and plans we could possibly imagine." The plans for "The Florida Project", officially dubbed Disney World, called for a Disneyland-style theme park and resort area, EPCOT, an industrial park, an airport, and an entrance complex.

Disney quietly purchased undeveloped swampland in Osceola County and Orange County using dummy corporations to avoid price gouging. A November 1965 headline in the Orlando Sentinel described the acquisition story as reading 'Like [a] Bond Thriller'. By June 1965, Disney had acquired 27,433 acres—twice the size of Manhattan—for an estimated $5.1 million ($52,104,013 in 2025). Walt Disney had planned to announce Disney World on November 15, 1965, publicly. Still, after the Orlando Sentinel broke the story of Disney's land purchase, Disney asked then-Florida Governor W. Haydon Burns to confirm the story on October 25. His announcement boasted that the new theme park would be, "The greatest attraction in the history of Florida." The official announcement was made on the previously planned November 15 date, with Disney joining Burns in Orlando for the press conference.

Dissatisfied with the zoning regulations he had to deal with in Anaheim, Disney developed the Reedy Creek Improvement District (RCID) for the property. With the approval of the Florida legislature and the governor, as enshrined in the Reedy Creek Improvement Act, the District had most of the powers of a Florida county, and was exempt from county regulation relating to zoning, building, subdivision, safety, and sanitation; as well as state law relating to land use and building codes. However, in lieu of this local and state regulation, Disney imposed even stronger codes.

=== The EPCOT film ===
To lobby the Florida legislature to approve the RCID and persuade American industries to participate in the project, a short film was shot at the Walt Disney Studios on October 27, 1966, two months before Disney's death. Written by Marty Sklar and directed by Art Vitarelli, the 25-minute film is hosted by Disney, who explains the plans for Disney World, focusing on how EPCOT would interrelate with other aspects of the property.

The film, utilizing concept art and highly technical animation, was a start to the conceptualization of EPCOT. The EPCOT philosophy, as it became known, included showcasing the development, testing, and use of new materials and ideas from American industries to find solutions to urban problems. EPCOT would always be in a state of becoming, the philosophy detailed, focusing on the needs and happiness of residents, and generating demand for new technologies.

EPCOT was screened for Florida legislators on February 2, 1967. Clips of the film were shown periodically as part of TV specials in the decades after that. The film was released in its entirety on DVD in May of 2004 as part of the Walt Disney Treasures: Tomorrowland collection.

=== Industry partners ===
In support of EPCOT's mission to showcase new developments in technology, Disney sought the participation of industry partners. The company had built numerous industry relationships over the years, and used the 1964 New York World's Fair to renew and solidify many of those contacts. By January 1966, Disney representatives had begun visiting heads of various American industries, including IBM, AT&T, U.S. Steel, Du Pont, Bell Laboratories, Honeywell, and Allied Chemical. These contacts persisted after Walt's death.

== Master plan and community site ==
Disney personally sketched a master plan for the Florida property known as the Seventh Preliminary Master Plot Plan, in 1966, the year of his death. The main features of the plan included the theme park, hotels, campgrounds and motels, convention facilities, the EPCOT city and a satellite community, a golf course, a "swamp ride", an industrial park, a tourist trailer camp, a main entrance, and a "jet airport". In addition, a monorail would run the length of the property, north to south.

The EPCOT city, according to the concepts presented in the EPCOT film, was based on a radial plan, a design inspired by the garden city movement of urban planning. Based on a concept similar to the layout of Disneyland, the city would have radiated out like spokes from a central core. The urban density of the area would decrease as the city stretched out.

Visitors would enter at the southern end of the Disney World property and be shuttled by monorail to the Welcome Center. There, they would be welcomed by Disney employees able to speak the guests' languages. Visitors would re-board the monorail to arrive at the industrial park. There, guests would ride people-movers to see warehouses and research and development laboratories from American industry. Walt hoped visitors could take ideas back home to improve their communities. After visiting the industrial park, the monorail would take the guests to EPCOT, where they would arrive at the central city.

=== Transportation ===
The city would be connected to the other points in Disney World with a main line of transportation — the monorail. Walt Disney introduced the Disneyland Monorail in 1959. The monorail would cut through the center of the city, connecting EPCOT with the northern and southern points of the Disney World property.

Internal transportation would be provided by a new Disney transportation concept, the WEDway PeopleMover. The system uses motors located between the tracks to propel vehicles along a pair of steel rails. PeopleMover cars would transport residents from the metropolitan center to the outer residential areas. The PeopleMover concept was first demonstrated at Disneyland's Tomorrowland in 1967. The PeopleMover was also installed at the Magic Kingdom as the WEDway PeopleMover in 1975.

Because of these two modes of transportation, residents of EPCOT would not need cars. If a resident owned a car, it would be used "only for weekend pleasure trips." The streets for cars would be kept separate from the main pedestrian areas. The main roads for both cars and supply trucks would travel underneath the city core, eliminating the risk of pedestrian accidents. This was also based on the concept that Walt Disney devised for Disneyland. He did not want his guests to see behind-the-scenes activity, such as supply trucks delivering goods to the city. Like the Magic Kingdom in Walt Disney World, all supplies are discreetly delivered via tunnels.

The two systems, the monorail, and PeopleMover, would come together at the EPCOT Transportation Lobby. The Transportation Lobby would be located at ground level, above the busy automobile/truck roads. From the Lobby, a passenger riding the monorail from the Magic Kingdom Park to their home would disembark the monorail and transfer to the appropriate PeopleMover station.

Beyond EPCOT, the Airport of Tomorrow, situated opposite the Main Entrance, was planned to connect to the park via a monorail station.

The planned airport would have had a general aviation area with an executive terminal, and another for regional passenger travel with a large terminal building. Plans identified the airport in 1966 but were not present in the revised plans in the later 1970s.

=== City center ===
EPCOT's downtown and commercial areas would have been located in the central core of the city, away from the residential areas. The entire downtown would have been completely enclosed, unaffected by the outside elements. Roy Disney stated that "The pedestrian will be king" in this area, free from the danger of cars and other vehicles.

At the center of the area would be a 30-story Cosmopolitan Hotel and Convention Center. This building was to have been the tallest in Disney World and could have been seen for miles. The parking lot for hotel guests would have been located underneath the city core, right off of the vehicle throughway.

On the "roof" of the enclosed area would be the recreational area for hotel guests. The pool, tennis courts, basketball courts, shuffleboard, and other activities would have been located here. According to Imagineer Bob Gurr, Walt Disney pointed to one of the benches on the scale model of the area and declared, "This is where Lilly [his wife] and I will sit when this thing is finished, taking everything in".

Surrounding the hotel, inside the enclosure, would have been "shops and restaurants that reflect the culture and flavor of locations 'round the world." According to the concept art, these areas would be themed to resemble each country, having the look and feel of each of the exotic locales. This concept eventually evolved into the World Showcase area of the Epcot theme park. The PeopleMover track would travel above these downtown shops and streets similarly as the system did in Disneyland. The preliminary plan indicated that the people who would have worked in these shops would have also lived in the city.

=== Green belt ===
Separating the city core from the low-density residential area would be an expanse of grass areas, known to the planners as the "green belt." This is where the city services would be located. Establishments such as parks with playgrounds, community centers, schools, stadiums, and churches would be located here.

=== Residential areas ===
On the rim of the city core would have been high-density apartment housing. This is where most of EPCOT's 20,000 citizens would have lived. Not much is discussed about the apartments themselves, although Walt Disney stated that no one in EPCOT would own their land. There would be no difference between an apartment and a house. All renting rates would be modest and competitive with the surrounding market. Housing would be constructed in such a way as to ensure ease of change so that new ideas/products could be used. A person returning from a hard day's work could very well come home to a kitchen with brand-new appliances in it.

Beyond the Green Belt were the low-density, single-family house neighborhoods. These areas would have resembled the petals on a flower, with the houses located on the rim of each "petal". Inside the "petal" was a vast green area. The area would have had paths for electric carts, light recreation areas for adults, and play areas for children. The PeopleMover station for each area would have also been located in the green area. The resident could simply walk to the station from their home and on to work. As with the apartments, the houses would be built to be easily changed.

=== Living and employment ===
In an October 1966 interview, Walt Disney said of EPCOT,

"There'll be no landowners, and therefore no voting control. People will rent homes instead of buying them, and at market rentals. There will be no retirees. Everyone must be employed. One of our requirements is that people who live in EPCOT must help keep it alive. [...] In EPCOT there will be no slum areas because we won't let them develop."

In that same interview, Disney announced plans for a second city in Florida, accommodating retirees or people who wished to purchase property. This city would be an experimental laboratory for administering municipal governments.

EPCOT residents would be employed at the Magic Kingdom theme park, the city's central core shopping areas, the hotel/convention center, the airport, the Welcome Center, or the industrial park. As the film states, "Everyone living in EPCOT will have the responsibility to maintain this living blueprint of the future."

== General Electric's Progress City model ==
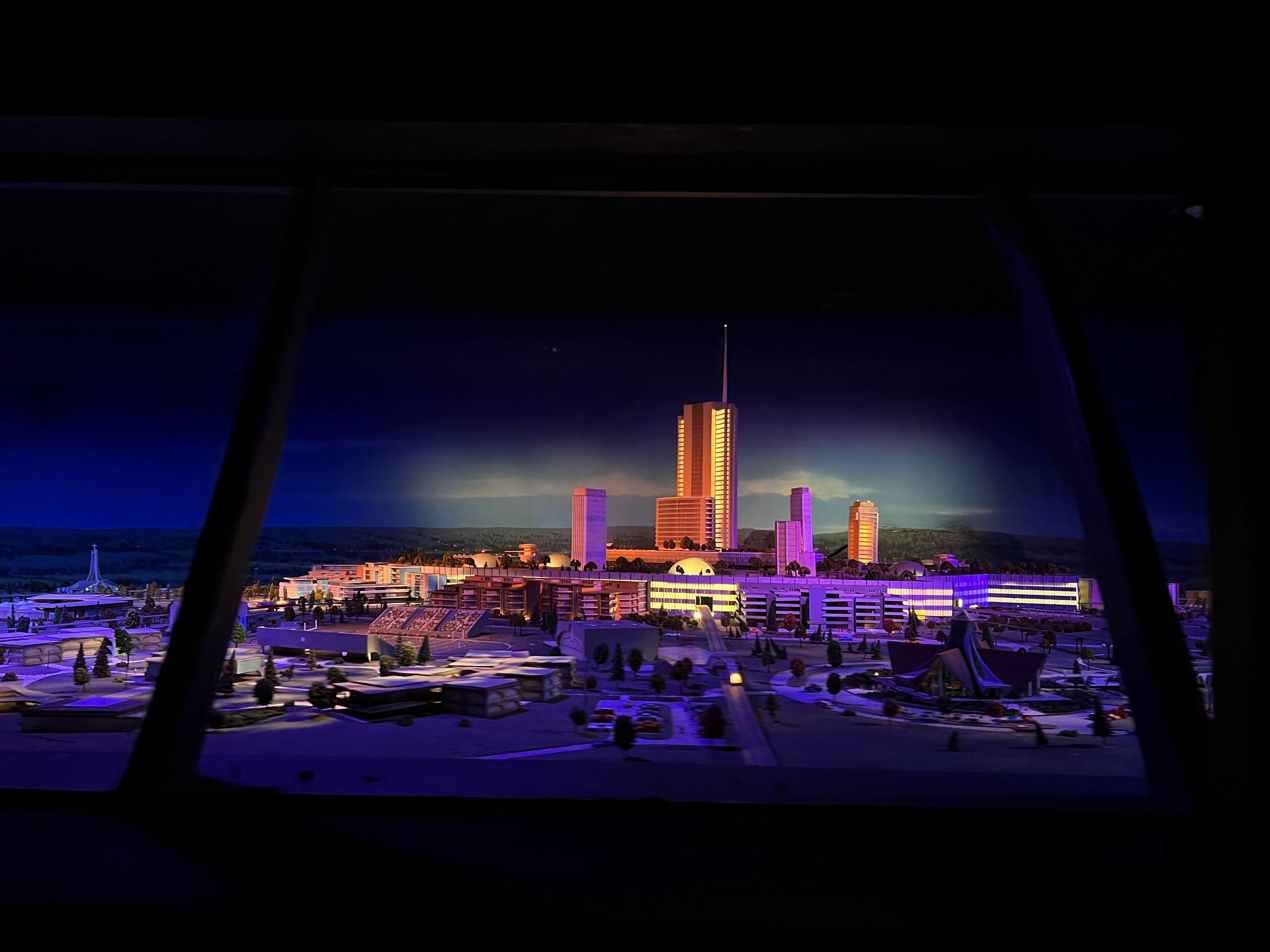
The remaining portion of the Progress City model is on display at Magic Kingdom.

The Carousel of Progress, sponsored by General Electric, was one of four pavilions or attractions that Disney produced for the 1964 New York World's Fair. The show centered around an Audio-Animatronic American family presenting the progress of household technology from the turn of the 20th century to the then-present. Guests were seated in an outer ring of six theaters that rotated around a fixed, circular stage. The show's theme song, "There's a Great Big Beautiful Tomorrow," was written by the Sherman brothers and reflects Walt's upbeat view of progress and American industry.

The Carousel of Progress opened in Tomorrowland at Disneyland in July 1967, and featured a huge, one-eighth-scale model called Progress City on the second floor as the show's finale. The model, which could be viewed either on foot or from the PeopleMover attraction, was constructed after Disney's death and was meant to be a visual representation of his EPCOT plans, including the city center and hotel, high-density apartments, greenbelt, and single-family houses. It measured 6,900 square feet and included 22,000 trees and shrubs, 4,500 buildings lit from within, 1,400 streetlights, a climate-controlled center city, an amusement park, sports stadiums, an airport, an atomic power plant, underground passageways, single-family culs-de-sac, electric sidewalks, schools, churches, electric trains, electric carts, and PeopleMovers.

General Electric and Westinghouse had been in merger discussions with the Disney organization, but a deal never came to fruition. EPCOT would be an expensive proposition. In a 1968 print advertisement, General Electric announced that it had "much of the technology needed ... But as futuristic as it sounds, it could be built today." The ad also featured a photograph of Progress City. General Electric was prepared to tackle EPCOT.

Disneyland's Carousel of Progress closed in 1973 and the show was moved to Walt Disney World's Magic Kingdom in 1975. A portion of the Progress City architectural model is on display on the Tomorrowland Transit Authority PeopleMover today, located in Tomorrowland at the Magic Kingdom.

== EPCOT after Disney ==
Walt Disney died on December 15, 1966. According to his older brother Roy Disney, Walt was still planning EPCOT in the hospital in the days before he died. Walt used the ceiling grid to lay out a scale plot plan in his imagination, each 24" x 24" tile representing one square mile.

Florida Governor Claude R. Kirk Jr. signed Chapter 67-764 into law on May 12, 1967, establishing the Reedy Creek Improvement District. However, Disney directors eventually decided that it was too risky to venture into city planning now that its biggest advocate was gone. Roy persisted and took the reins on the project, coming out of retirement, but he could not convince the board to build EPCOT. The Magic Kingdom project proceeded with construction beginning the same year under the supervision of Roy, and Walt Disney World Resort opened in October 1971 with only the Magic Kingdom and two hotels. Roy insisted it be called Walt Disney World as a tribute to the man who had dreamed it up.

Even though the city was never built, the Resort represents some of the forward-thinking planning that embodied Walt's idea of EPCOT. Because of the formation of the RCID, Disney could find innovative solutions to the problems of transportation, building construction, supplying electrical power, and waste disposal. Imagineers, including John Hench and Richard Irvine, devised means of waste disposal and sewer transport. The monorail, while mainly an attraction at Disneyland, was utilized as an actual transportation system, taking guests some thirteen miles around the Resort area. The Contemporary Resort opened with the Magic Kingdom as an architectural remnant of EPCOT's modernist aesthetic.

Without Walt Disney's leadership, EPCOT's progress was "seriously weakened". In the late 1970s, Disney CEO Card Walker wanted to revisit the EPCOT idea, but the board was still wary, and all agreed that Walt's EPCOT would not work in its initial incarnation; they thought that no one would want to live under a microscope and be watched constantly. The result of the compromise was the EPCOT Center theme park (now simply known as EPCOT), which opened in 1982. While still emulating Walt Disney's ideas, it was not a city, but rather closer to that of a World's Fair. EPCOT, somewhat true to Walt Disney's vision, revolves around technology and the future in the Future World area. The World Showcase is an embellished version of the downtown shopping area, albeit without the enclosure.

In the early 1990s, the Walt Disney Company built a community on the Florida property called Celebration. It is a planned community that employs some of the ideas that Walt Disney envisioned but on a significantly smaller scale. Unlike EPCOT, which was based on modernism and futurism, there is no radial design for Celebration. Celebration is designed based on new urbanism, and resembles a small American town, but has all the modern conveniences, without the revolutionary transportation ideas contained in the plans for EPCOT. Similar planned communities, known as lifestyle centers, are now being built by other planners.

In the early 1970s, the city of Rotonda West, Florida, near to Punta Gorda on Florida's Gulf of Mexico coastline, was created. The city uses a circular grid layout, divided into eight sections and a central hub, similar to a wagon wheel.
