= Rule against perpetuities =

Legal rule prohibiting very long temporary interests in property

The rule against perpetuities is a legal rule in common law that prevents people from using legal instruments (usually a deed or a will) to exert control over the ownership of private property for a time long beyond the lives of people living at the time the instrument was written. Specifically, the rule forbids a person from creating future interests (traditionally contingent remainders and executory interests) in property that might feasibly vest beyond 21 years after the lifetimes of those living at the time of creation of the interest, often expressed as a "life in being plus twenty-one years". In essence, the rule prevents a person from putting qualifications and criteria in a deed or a will that would continue to affect the ownership of property long after he or she has died, a concept often referred to as control by the "dead hand" or "mortmain". The practical effect of this is that control can be exercised over no more than two future generations – a will can create restrictions over the future disposal of real property by the testator's son and heir, but not over the further disposal of that property by that son's own heirs. Feasibly, such a third-generation disposal might fall further into the future than a life in being plus twenty-one years – and so terms in a will written to constrain that disposal would be void from the outset.

The basic elements of the rule against perpetuities originated in England in the 17th century and were "crystallized" into a single rule in the 19th century. The rule's classic formulation was given in 1886 by the American legal scholar John Chipman Gray:

No interest is good unless it must vest, if at all, not later than twenty-one years after some life in being at the creation of the interest.

— John Chipman Gray, Rule Against Perpetuities § 201.

The rule against perpetuities serves a number of purposes. First, English courts have long recognized that allowing owners to attach long-lasting contingencies to their property harms the ability of future generations to freely buy and sell the property, since few people would be willing to buy property that had unresolved issues regarding its ownership hanging over it. Second, judges often had concerns about the dead being able to impose excessive limitations on the ownership and use of property by those still living. For this reason, the rule allows testators to put contingencies on ownership only provided that no interest created vest later than 21 years after the death of some specified person alive at the creation of the interest. Lastly, the rule against perpetuities was sometimes used to prevent very large, possibly aristocratic, estates from being kept in one family for more than one or two generations at a time.

The rule also applies to options to acquire property. Often, one of the objectives of delaying the time of vesting is to avoid or reduce taxation of some sort. For example, a bequest in a will may be to one's grandchildren, often with a life interest to one's surviving spouse and then to the children, to avoid the payment of multiple death duties or inheritance taxes on the testator's estate. The rule against perpetuities was one of the devices developed to at least limit this tax avoidance strategy.

== Historical background ==
The rule has its origin in the Duke of Norfolk's Case of 1682. That case concerned Henry, 22nd Earl of Arundel, who had tried to create a shifting executory limitation so that some of his property would pass to his eldest son (who was mentally deficient) and then to his second son, and other property would pass to his second son, but then to his fourth son. The estate plan also included provisions for shifting property many generations later if certain conditions should occur.

When his second son, Henry, succeeded to his elder brother's property, he did not want to pass the other property to his younger brother, Charles. Charles sued to enforce his interest, and the court (in this instance, the House of Lords) held that such a shifting condition could not exist indefinitely. The judges believed that tying up property too long beyond the lives of people living at the time was wrong, although the exact period was not determined until another case, Cadell v Palmer, 150 years later.

The rule against perpetuities is closely related to another doctrine in the common law of property, the rule against unreasonable restraints on alienation. Both stem from an underlying principle or reference in the common law disapproving of restraints on property rights. However, while a violation of the rule against perpetuities is also a violation of the rule against unreasonable restraints on alienation, the reciprocal is not true. As one has stated, "The rule against perpetuities is an ancient, but still vital, rule of property law intended to enhance marketability of property interests by limiting remoteness of vesting." For this reason, another court has declared that the provisions of the rule are predicated upon "public policy" and thus "constitute non-waivable, legal prohibitions".

== Common law ==
Black's Law Dictionary defines the rule against perpetuities as "[t]he common-law rule prohibiting a grant of an estate unless the interest must vest, if at all, no later than 21 years (plus a period of gestation to cover a posthumous birth) after the death of some person alive when the interest was created."

At common law, the length of time was fixed at 21 years after the death of an identifiable person alive at the time the interest was created. This is often expressed as "lives in being plus twenty-one years". Under the common law rule, one does not look to whether an interest actually will vest more than 21 years after the lives in being. Instead, if there exists any possibility at the time of the grant, however unlikely or remote, that an interest will vest outside the perpetuities period, the interest is void and is stricken from the grant.

The rule does not apply to interests in the grantor himself. For example, the grant "For A so long as alcohol is not sold on the premises, then to B" would violate the rule as to B. The conveyance to B would be stricken, leaving "To A so long as alcohol is not sold on the premises." This would create a fee simple determinable in A, with a possibility of reverter in the grantor (or the grantor's heirs). The grant to B would be void as it is possible alcohol would be sold on the premises more than 21 years after the deaths of A, B, and the grantor. However, as the rule does not apply to grantors, the possibility of reverter in the grantor (or his heirs) would be valid.

== Statutory modification ==
Many jurisdictions have statutes that either cancel out the rule entirely or clarify it as to the period of time and persons affected:

- In England and Wales, dispositions of property subject to the rule before 14 July 1964 remain subject to the rule. The Perpetuities and Accumulations Act 1964 provides for the effect of the rule of interests created thereafter. The Perpetuities and Accumulations Act 2009 codified the "wait and see" doctrine developed by courts and made the perpetuity period 125 years.
- In Scotland there are similar provisions under the Trusts (Scotland) Act 1921.
- In the Republic of Ireland, the rule was abolished as of 1 December 2009.
- The states of the United States have differing approaches.
  - Some states follow the "wait-and-see approach", or "second look doctrine" or apply the "cy-près doctrine". Under the wait-and-see approach, the validity of a suspect future interest is determined on the basis of facts as they now exist at the end of the measuring life, and not at the time the interest was created. Under the cy-près doctrine, if the interest does violate the rule against perpetuities, the court may reform the grant in a way that does not violate the rule and reduce any offensive age contingency to 21 years.
  - 29 states or territories have adopted the Uniform Statutory Rule Against Perpetuities (or some variant of it), which extends the waiting period typically to 90 years after creation of the interest.
  - At least six states have abolished the rule in its entirety, and many have extended the vesting period of the wait-and-see approach for an extremely long period of time (in Florida, for example, up to 360 or 1000 years for trusts).
- In Australia, the states historically followed the English approach to perpetuities with statutory modifications, but state approaches have since diverged. In New South Wales, for example, the Perpetuities Act 1984 limits perpetuities to 80 years, but also adopts the "wait and see" approach. South Australia abolished the rule entirely under s 61 of the Law of Property Act 1936 (SA). Queensland abolished the common law rule under the Property Law Act 2023 (Qld), which commenced on 1 August 2025, replacing it with a fixed statutory perpetuity period of 125 years running from the day the disposition is made, unless the trust terms specify a shorter duration.

=== Application in the United States ===
The rule against perpetuities is one of the most difficult topics encountered by law school students. It is notoriously difficult to apply properly: in 1961, the Supreme Court of California ruled that it was not legal malpractice for an attorney to draft a will that inadvertently violated the rule. In the United States, the common law rule has been abolished by statute in Alaska, Idaho, New Jersey, Kentucky, Rhode Island, and South Dakota. Pennsylvania has adopted a statutory provision that reads on first glance as though it abolishes the rule, but in fact converts the law to the wait-and-see approach.

A new US Uniform Statutory Rule Against Perpetuities was published in 1986 that adopts the wait-and-see approach with a flat waiting period of 90 years in place of the rule of life in being plus 21 years. As of 2018, 31 jurisdictions have adopted the new rule: Alabama, Alaska, Arizona, Arkansas, California, Colorado, Connecticut, Florida, Georgia, Hawaii, Indiana, Kansas, Massachusetts, Minnesota, Montana, Nebraska, Nevada, New Jersey, New Mexico, North Carolina, North Dakota, Oregon, South Carolina, South Dakota, Tennessee, Utah, Virginia, Washington, and West Virginia, and the District of Columbia and the U.S. Virgin Islands. In 2015, the New York State Legislature considered whether or not to adopt the new rule.

Other jurisdictions apply the cy-près doctrine, which validates contingent remainders and executory interests. Under certain circumstances, the traditional rule would have considered these remainders and interests to be void.

== Applications ==
In 1919, Michigan lumber baron Wellington R. Burt died, leaving a will that specified that apart from small allowances, his estate was not to be distributed until 21 years after the death of the last of his grandchildren to be born in his lifetime. (Some parts of his estate were found to be exempt from the Rule, though.) This condition was met in 2010, 21 years after Marion Landsill (his last living granddaughter at the time of his death) died in November 1989. After the heirs reached an agreement, the estate, which had reached an estimated value of $100–110 million, was finally distributed in May 2011, 92 years after his death.

Real estate developer Henry G. Freeman established the Henry G. Freeman Jr. Pin Money Fund, which was intended to provide an annuity of $12,000 per year to the First Lady of the United States. Freeman died in 1917, but no presidential spouse received any payments from the fund until after Freeman's then-living descendants died out in 1989. Although Freeman's will stated that the payments were intended "to continue in force as long as this glorious government lasts", the trustees of the fund determined that maintaining the trust for more than 21 years after 1989 would violate the rule against perpetuities, and terminated the trust by agreement with then-First Lady Michelle Obama in 2010 to give the fund to charity instead. Hence, only four First Ladies ever received payments from the fund.

In 2023, the Walt Disney Company and the Reedy Creek Improvement District signed a development agreement that enacted restrictive covenants to limit the district's governing power over Disney properties in Florida, which include Walt Disney World, just prior to a state takeover of the district's board. The agreement referenced the rule against perpetuities, stating that if a perpetual term is deemed invalid, then the agreement "shall continue until twenty-one (21) years after the death of the last survivor of the descendants of King Charles III, king of England, living as of the date of this agreement."

== Charity-to-charity exception ==
The rule never applies to conditions placed on a conveyance to a charity that, if violated, would convey the property to another charity. For example, a conveyance "to the Red Cross, so long as it operates an office on the property, but if it does not, then to the World Wildlife Fund" would be valid under the rule, because both parties are charities. Even though the interest of the fund might not vest for hundreds of years, the conveyance would nonetheless be held valid. The exception, however, does not apply if the conveyance, upon violation of the condition, is not from one charity to another charity. Thus, a devise "to John Smith, so long as no one operates a liquor store on the premises, but if someone does operate a liquor store on the premises, then to the Roman Catholic Church" would violate the rule. The exception would not apply to the transfer from John Smith to the Roman Catholic Church because John Smith is not a charity. Also, if the original conveyance was "to John Smith and his heirs for as long as John Smith or his heirs do not use the premises to sell liquor, but if he does, then to the Red Cross" this would violate the rule because it could be more than 21 years before the interest in Red Cross would vest, and therefore, their interest is void. Thus leaving John with a fee simple determinable and the grantor a possibility of reverter.

== Saving clause ==
In order to satisfy the rule against perpetuities, the class of people must be limited and determinable. Thus, one cannot say in a deed "until the last of the people in the world now living dies, plus 21 years". To avoid problems caused by incorrectly drafted legal instruments, practitioners in some jurisdictions include a "saving clause" almost universally as a form of disclaimer. This standard clause is commonly called the "Kennedy clause" or the "Rockefeller clause" because the determinable "lives in being" are designated as the descendants of Joseph P. Kennedy (the father of John F. Kennedy), or John D. Rockefeller. Both designate well-known families with many descendants, and are consequently suitable for named, identifiable lives in being. For a time, it was popular to use a royal lives clause, and make the term of a deed run until the last of the descendants of (for example) Queen Victoria now living dies plus 21 years.

== Related rules ==
Jurisdictions may limit usufruct periods. For example, if a corporation builds a ski slope, and gives rights of use (usufruct) as gifts to corporate partners, these cannot last in perpetuity, but must terminate after a period that must be specified, e.g. 10 years. A perpetual usufruct is thus forbidden and "perpetual" might mean a long, but finite period, such as 99 years. Here usufruct is distinct from a share, which may be held in perpetuity.

== Illustrations ==
The fertile octogenarian and the unborn widow are two legal fictions from the law of real property (and trusts) that can be used either to invoke the rule against perpetuities to make an interest in property void or, alternatively and much more frequently, to demonstrate the seemingly bizarre results that can occur as a result of the rule. The rule itself, simply stated, makes a future interest in property void if it can be logically proven that there is some possibility of the interest not vesting or failing within 21 years after the end of a life in being at the time the interest is created.

=== The fertile octogenarian ===
The fertile octogenarian is a hypothetical character that comes up when applying the rule against perpetuities. The rule presumes that anyone, even an octogenarian (i.e., someone between 80 and 89 years of age) can bear a child, regardless of sex or health. For instance, suppose that a will devises a piece of land known as Blackacre "to A for her life, and then to the first of A's children to reach 25 years of age". A is, at the time the will is probated, an 85-year-old woman. In applying the rule against perpetuities, an imaginative lawyer will argue (and a court must accept under the common law rule itself) that A could have a child in her 86th year and then in her 87th year all of A's other children could die, then in her 88th year A herself could die. Because the interest will not vest until her new child reaches 25 years of age, which cannot happen until more than 21 years after A and her other children (together who form the "lives in being" to which the rule refers) have all died, the rule against perpetuities makes the entire gift "to the first of A's children to reach 25 years of age" void. A will hold Blackacre for life, and then the property will revert to the person whose will transferred it to A in the first place. (Actually, it will go to that person's estate, since the will was probated only after their death.)

While it is true that there is often no statutory maximum age limit to perform an adoption, the fertile octogenarian rule predates the laws allowing legal adoption under common law.

The legal fiction of the fertile octogenarian assumes that a living person, regardless of sex, age, or physical condition, will always be capable of having more children, thus allowing an interest to vest 21 years after all the lives in being at the time of the grant are dead. Couples have been known to marry in their late eighties.

In certain places this assumption will be limited to a fixed age set by statute. Furthermore, many jurisdictions have discarded old common-law fictions such as the "fertile octogenarian".

A related legal fiction, which assumes that a living person is fertile at birth, is known as the precocious toddler.

=== The unborn widow ===
The problem of the unborn widow is a frequently used illustration of the odd outcomes of the traditional rule against perpetuities. The unborn widow rule prohibits an unidentified widow from being treated as a validating life. If, for example, a grantor's will devised land "to my son, for life; then to his wife [or widow], for life; then to his children living at the time of her death", the children's contingent remainder (contingent on their status as "living" at the time of the widow's death) would be invalid, even if the grantor's son was an elderly and already-married man. Regardless of the age of the grantor's son, he could leave or lose by death his current wife and subsequently marry another woman who was not yet born at the time of conveyance; thus the widow that survived him would not be, with certainty, a life in being at the time of conveyance.

The rule against perpetuities voids the interest to B's children "then living". (However, if the phrase "then living" is removed, the interest would vest immediately upon B's death because both his widow and all his children would be identifiable at that time.)

=== Other examples ===
Other hypothetically relevant possibilities which almost never actually occur but have been invoked by lawyers or courts to invalidate transfers under the rule against perpetuities include the slothful executor (a situation where the executor of the estate does not probate the will for many years after the testator's death), the magic gravel pit (a transfer to be made as soon as a gravel pit is out of gravel may not vest for hundreds of years), the war that never ends (a transfer to be made at the end of a war might never happen), and other similar situations.

=== Criticism and humor ===
Because these hypothetical scenarios show how a reasonable gift can be voided based on so unlikely an outcome, they have generated much criticism among legal scholars, resulting in the abrogation of the rule against perpetuities by statute in many jurisdictions. Many U.S. states have adopted laws modifying the application of the rule by requiring courts to "wait and see" for a period of years, sometimes as long as 360 years (which effectively negates the possibility of litigation ensuing during the life of any person alive at the same time of the author of the will).

Some jurisdictions have ameliorated specific problems of the rule by creating statutory presumptions to counter those problems. Under such statutes, for example, a woman is presumed to no longer be fertile after a particular age (typically 55), and a gift to a person's widow or widower is presumed to vest in whoever was that person's spouse at the time of the gift.

These rules have also long been a target of legal humorists.

== Cultural references ==
The rule against perpetuities is the basis of a prominent plot point in the 1981 film Body Heat. The rule is also the basis of a secondary plot line in the 2011 film The Descendants—though its actual content is not discussed in the film, making it a MacGuffin.

== See also ==
- Cestui que – Concept in English law regarding beneficiaries
- Cy-près doctrine – Court amendment of a legal document
- Executory contract – Contract not fully performed or executed
- Executory interest – Right to property taking effect later
- Royal lives clause – Common law contract clause
- Statutes of Mortmain – 1279 and 1290 English statutes
- Thellusson v Woodford – 1799 United Kingdom case
- Werling v. Sandy – 1985 Ohio Supreme Court case
