= Time immemorial =

Phrase denoting before memory or record

Time immemorial (Latin: Ab immemorabili) is a phrase meaning time extending beyond the reach of memory, record, or tradition, indefinitely ancient, "ancient beyond memory or record". The phrase is used in legally significant contexts as well as in common parlance.

== In law ==
In law, time immemorial denotes "a period of time beyond which legal memory cannot go", and "time out of mind". Most frequently, the phrase appears as a legal term of art in judicial discussion of common law development and, in Canada and the United States, the property rights of indigenous peoples. The term also appears in the same context in the law of Spanish colonies in the Americas as desde tiempos inmemoriales.

=== English and American common law ===
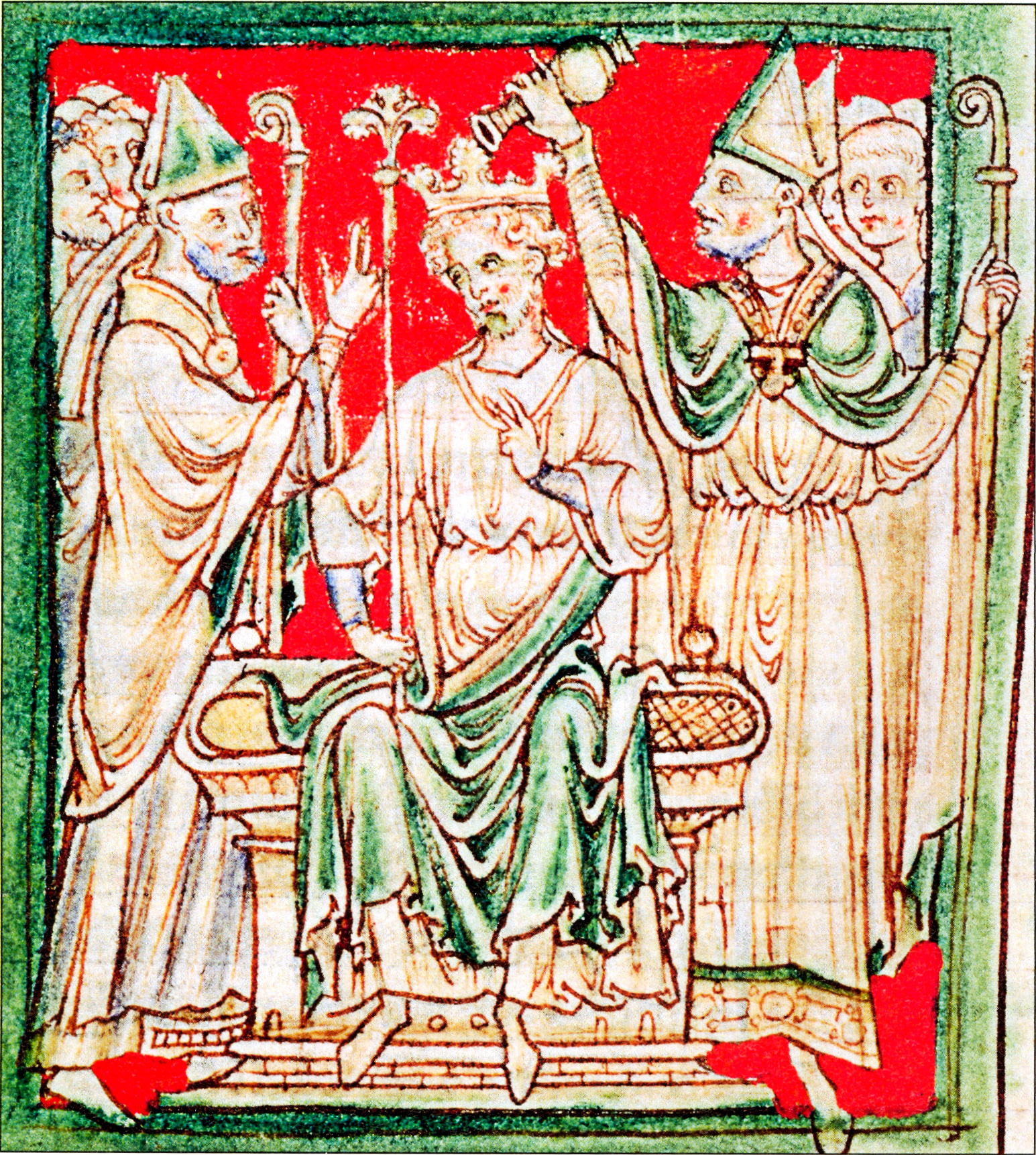
Richard I the Lionheart being anointed during his coronation in Westminster Abbey in 1189, from a 13th-century chronicle. Any time before the accession of Richard I is considered "time immemorial" in English law.

"Time immemorial" is frequently used to describe the time required for a custom to mature into common law. Medieval historian Richard Barber describes this as "the watershed between a primarily oral culture and a world where writing was paramount". Common law is a body of law identified by judges in judicial proceedings, rather than created by the legislature. Judges determine the common law by pinpointing the legal principles consistently reiterated in previous legal cases over a long period of time.

In English law, the Statute of Westminster of 1275 (3 Edw. 1) decreed that time immemorial ends and legal memory begins at 1189, the end of the reign of King Henry II, who is associated with the invention of English common law. As common law is found to have a non-historical, "immemorial" advent, it is distinct from laws created by monarchs or legislative bodies on a fixed date. In English law, "time immemorial" has also been used to specify the time required to establish a prescriptive right. The Prescription Act 1832 (2 & 3 Will. 4. c. 71), which noted that the full expression was "time immemorial, or time whereof the memory of man runneth not to the contrary", replaced the burden of proving "time immemorial" for the enjoyment of particular land rights with statutory fixed time periods of up to 60 years.

Canadian and American law inherited the English common law tradition. Unlike English law, Canadian and American law does not set "time immemorial", and courts vary in their demands to establish "immemoriality" for the purposes of common law. In Knowles v. Dow, a New Hampshire court found that a regular usage for 20 years, unexplained and uncontradicted, is sufficient to warrant a jury in finding the existence of an immemorial custom. More often than not, however, American courts identify common law without any reference to the phrase "time immemorial".

=== Tribal law ===
==== Water rights ====
"Time Immemorial" is sometimes used to describe the priority date of water rights holders. In the western United States, water rights are administered under the doctrine of prior appropriation. Under prior appropriation, water rights are acquired by making a beneficial use of water. Water rights that are acquired earlier are senior, and have priority over later, junior water rights during water shortages due to drought or over-appropriation. Generally, the priority date of water rights held by Native American tribes, also called Winters rights, is the date the tribe's reservation was established. However, courts occasionally find that the tribe's water rights carry a "time immemorial" priority date, the most senior date conceivable, for aboriginal uses of water on reserved land that overlaps with the tribe's aboriginal land. For example, in U.S. v. Adair, the court reasoned that the Klamath Tribe necessarily had water rights with a priority date of "time immemorial" because they had lived and used the waters in central Oregon and northern California for over a thousand uninterrupted years prior to entering a treaty with the United States in 1864.

==== Aboriginal title ====
When claiming or finding aboriginal title, the land rights Native Americans possess over the lands they have continuously and exclusively occupied for a long time prior to the intrusion of other occupants, plaintiff tribes and courts sometimes describe their occupancy as dating back to "time immemorial".

==== Oral tradition evidence ====
Historically, American judges lacked confidence in the use of Native American oral traditional evidence, oral histories shared between past and present generations, in court. Since the Pueblo de Zia decision of the United States Court of Federal Claims in 1964, oral traditional evidence has received increased judicial endorsement. In affirming the use of Native American oral traditional evidence to establish title to land, the Pueblo de Zia court described the testimony as having been handed down between tribal council members from "time immemorial".

== See also ==
- Acquiescence
- Legal fiction
- Prehistory
- Royal lives clause
- Uradel
- Usucaption
