= Perpetuities and Accumulations Act 1964 =

Act of the Parliament of the United Kingdom

Perpetuities and Accumulations Act 1964 (Note: Section 15(1).)
- Act of Parliament
- Parliament of the United Kingdom
- Long title: An Act to modify the law of England and Wales relating to the avoidance of future interests in property on grounds of remoteness and governing accumulations of income from property.
- Citation: 1964 c. 55
- Territorial extent: England and Wales (Note: Section 15(9).)

Dates
- Royal assent: 16 July 1964
- Commencement: 16 July 1964 (Note: The Acts of Parliament (Commencement) Act 1793.)
Other legislation
Amends	Law of Property Act 1925
Amended by	Perpetuities and Accumulations Act 2009

Status: Amended

Text of statute as originally enacted

Revised text of statute as amended

Text of the Perpetuities and Accumulations Act 1964 as in force today (including any amendments) within the United Kingdom, from legislation.gov.uk.

The Perpetuities and Accumulations Act 1964 (c. 55) is an act of the Parliament of the United Kingdom. In English land law it reformed the rule against perpetuities. Sections 13 and 14 dealt with the periods for which accumulations of income under a settlement or other arrangement are permitted, amending section 164 of the Law of Property Act 1925 (15 & 16 Geo. 5. c. 20).

== Overview ==
The act includes the establishment of a defined perpetuity period, which set a limit on how long future interests could be held in abeyance. This period was generally 80 years from the date of creation of the interest, although specific conditions could extend this period under certain circumstances. It also addressed the rule against excessive accumulations of income, which previously allowed for income to be accumulated indefinitely under certain trust provisions. The reforms introduced a statutory limitation on how long income could be accumulated before it must be distributed. In 2009, many of the Act's principles were further reformed by the Perpetuities and Accumulations Act 2009, which introduced a single, simplified perpetuity period of 125 years, replacing the earlier rules.

== Provisions ==
Section 1 of the act allowed the instrument making a disposition to specify a perpetuity period of up to 80 years instead of the period that would otherwise apply, except where the disposition was made in exercise of a special power of appointment. Section 2 set presumptions about when a person can have a child (a man at 14 or over, and a woman aged between 12 and 55), subject to evidence in the case of a living person.

Section 3 of the act provided that a disposition which might vest too remotely is treated as valid until it is established that vesting must occur, if at all, after the end of the perpetuity period. Where the instrument did not specify a period, the period was determined by the lives of the persons listed in the section who were in being and ascertainable at the start of the period, or failing that was 21 years.

Section 4 of the act reduced a specified age above 21 to the nearest age that saved the disposition from being void for remoteness, and excluded potential class members where that was needed to save it; section 4(6) also repealed section 163 of the Law of Property Act 1925 (15 & 16 Geo. 5. c. 20).

Section 5 of the act dealt with dispositions limited to the death of the survivor of a person and that person's spouse, section 6 of the act with expectant interests and acceleration, section 7 with powers of appointment, and section 8 of the act with administrative powers of trustees. Section 9 provided that the rule did not apply to certain options to acquire a reversion on a lease, and set a period of 21 years for options over land generally.

Section 10 of the act made a disposition void for remoteness as between the original parties. Section 11 of the act disapplied the rule to powers and remedies for enforcing rentcharges, and section 12 of the act applied it to possibilities of reverter and similar determinable interests.

Section 13 of the act provided that the periods for which accumulations of income are permitted by section 164 of the Law of Property Act 1925 (15 & 16 Geo. 5. c. 20) include 21 years from the making of the disposition and the minority of any person in being at that date. Section 14 of the act applied section 2 to questions about the right of beneficiaries to put an end to accumulations. Section 15 of the act applied sections 1 to 14 only to instruments taking effect after the act came into force, provided that the act bound the Crown, and excluded Scotland and, apart from subsection (8), Northern Ireland.

== Subsequent developments ==
Section 13, which amended section 164 of the Law of Property Act 1925 (15 & 16 Geo. 5. c. 20), was repealed by section 13(b) of, and the schedule to, the Perpetuities and Accumulations Act 2009, which came into force on 6 April 2010.

Section 16 of the 2009 act inserted subsections (5A) and (5B) into section 15, with effect from 6 April 2010. Sections 1 to 12 of the 1964 act no longer apply to an instrument taking effect on or after that date, except a will executed before it or an instrument made in exercise of a special power of appointment created by an instrument that took effect before it.

== See also ==
- Perpetuities and Accumulations Act 2009
