= Central Florida Tourism Oversight District =

Tax district in Florida, United States

Coordinates: 28.35°N 81.56°W

Central Florida Tourism Oversight District Reedy Creek Improvement District
- Improvement district
- Logo used since 2023
- Map showing the cities of Bay Lake (red) and Lake Buena Vista (green), and unincorporated land (purple)
- Country: United States
- State: Florida
- County: Orange, Osceola
- Established: May 12, 1967

Government
  - Type: Council–administrator
  - Chair of the Board: Alexis Yarbrough
  - Board of Supervisors: Bridget Ziegler; Brian Aungst, Jr.; John Gilbert; Scott Workman
  - District Administrator: Stephanie Kopelousos

Area
  - Total: 39.06 sq mi (101.2 km^{2})
- Time zone: UTC−05:00 (EST)
  - Summer (DST): UTC−04:00 (EDT)
- Area code(s): 407, 689
- Website: www.oversightdistrict.org

The Central Florida Tourism Oversight District (CFTOD), formerly the Reedy Creek Improvement District (RCID), is the governing jurisdiction and special taxing district for the land of Walt Disney World Resort. It includes 39.06 sq mi (101.2 km^{2}) within Orange and Osceola counties in Florida, encompassing the cities of Bay Lake and Lake Buena Vista as well as unincorporated land. It acts with most of the same authority and responsibility as a county government.

The current district was created on February 27, 2023, after the Florida Legislature passed House Bill 9B to supersede the Reedy Creek Improvement Act, passed in 1967 at the behest of Walt Disney and his namesake media company during the planning stages of Walt Disney World. A major selling point in lobbying the Florida Legislature to establish the original RCID was Walt Disney's proposal of the "Experimental Prototype Community of Tomorrow" (EPCOT), a real planned community intended to serve as a testbed for new city-living innovations. The company eventually abandoned Walt Disney's concepts for the experimental city, primarily building a resort similar to its other parks.

The Reedy Creek Improvement District managed by the Disney Company had the authority of a governmental body, but was not subject to the constraints of a governmental body. That changed under the 2023 act, which gave the governor of Florida the authority to name its board members, replacing the original five-member Board of Supervisors controlled by the Walt Disney Company, the majority landowner of the District.

In April 2022, the Florida Legislature passed a law to disestablish the RCID and other special districts formed before November 5, 1968, an act that some lawmakers said was retaliation for Disney's opposition to the Parental Rights in Education Act, dubbed the "Don't Say Gay" bill by its critics. The law would have taken effect in June 2023, but it was unclear what would happen to the $1 billion in bond liabilities held by the RCID. On February 9 and 10, 2023, the state legislature voted to revert most of the changes, replace the RCID board's five Disney-selected members with five members appointed by the Governor with confirmation by the Florida State Senate, and remove parts of the district's authority, such as the power to construct a nuclear power plant, airport, and stadium. The district's name was changed the day the bill was signed into law by Governor Ron DeSantis on February 27, 2023. On April 26, 2023, Disney filed a lawsuit against DeSantis. Federal Judge Allen Winsor ruled in favor of DeSantis on January 31, 2024, and Disney appealed to the 11th Circuit Court of Appeals. On March 27, 2024, Disney settled its state court lawsuits with CFTOD and, per the agreement, put the appeal of their federal lawsuit on hold while the company negotiates a new development agreement with CFTOD. The settlement came a day after DeSantis replaced two Disney critics on the CFTOD with two Disney supporters and two weeks after the Parental Rights in Education Act, as originally written, was substantially narrowed by a court settlement that both sides portrayed as a victory for their own cause.

== History ==
=== Creation ===
==== Initial steps ====
Logo as the Reedy Creek Improvement District

After the success of Disneyland in California, Walt Disney began planning a second park on the East Coast. He disliked the businesses that had sprung up around Disneyland, and wanted control of a much larger area of land for the new project. He flew over the Orlando-area site, and many other potential sites, in November 1963. Seeing the well-developed network of roads, including the planned Interstate 4 and Florida's Turnpike, with McCoy Air Force Base (later Orlando International Airport) to the east, he selected a centrally located site near Bay Lake. He used multiple shell companies to buy up land, at very low prices, that eventually would be included within the district. These company names are listed on the upper story windows of what is now the Main Street USA section of Walt Disney World, including Compass East Corporation; Latin-American Development and Management Corporation; Ayefour Corporation (named for nearby I-4); Tomahawk Properties, Incorporated; Reedy Creek Ranch, Incorporated; and Bay Lake Properties, Incorporated.

On March 11, 1966, these landowners, all fully owned subsidiaries of what is now the Walt Disney Company, petitioned the Circuit Court of the Ninth Judicial Circuit, which served Orange County, Florida, for the creation of the Reedy Creek Drainage District under Chapter 298 of the Florida Statutes. After a period during which some minor landowners within the boundaries opted out, the Drainage District was incorporated on May 13, 1966, as a public corporation. Among the powers of a Drainage District were the power to condemn and acquire property outside its boundaries "for the public use". It used this power at least once to obtain land for Canal C-1 (Bonnet Creek) through land that was developed as the Bonnet Creek Resort, a non-Disney resort which opened in 2020.

==== Improvement district and cities ====
Walt Disney knew that his plans for the land would be easier to carry out with more independence. Among his ideas for his Florida project was his proposed EPCOT, the Experimental Prototype Community of Tomorrow, which was to be a futuristic planned city (and which was also known as Progress City). He envisioned a real working city with both commercial and residential areas, but one that also continued to showcase and test new ideas and concepts for urban living. Therefore, the Disney company petitioned the Florida State Legislature for the creation of the Reedy Creek Improvement District, which would have almost total autonomy within its borders. Residents of Orange and Osceola counties did not need to pay any taxes unless they were residents of the district. Services like land use regulation and planning, building codes, surface water control, drainage, waste treatment, utilities, roads, bridges, fire protection, emergency medical services, and environmental services were overseen by the district. The only areas where the district had to submit to the county and state would be property taxes and elevator inspections. The planned EPCOT city was also emphasized in this lobbying effort.

On May 12, 1967, Governor Claude R. Kirk Jr. signed the Reedy Creek Improvement Act, adding the following Florida statutes to implement Disney's plans:

- Chapter 67-764 created the Reedy Creek Improvement District;
- Chapter 67-1104 established the City of Bay Lake; and
- Chapter 67-1965 established the City of Reedy Creek (later renamed as the City of Lake Buena Vista around 1970.)

According to a press conference held in Winter Park, Florida, on February 2, 1967, by Disney vice president Donn Tatum, the Improvement District and cities were created to serve "the needs of those residing there", because the company needed its own government to "clarify the District's authority to [provide services] within the District's limits", and because of the public nature of the planned development. The original city boundaries did not cover the whole Improvement District; they may have been intended as the areas where communities would be built for residential use. To maintain full control of the district, it was important for Disney to limit the voting rights of the inhabitants, rights which were only meant to include landowners owning more than one-half acre. Since Disney owned most of the land, the residents would simply be renting their homes. But after the 1968 Avery v. Midland County case, Disney feared that they would have to eventually give everyone living inside the district voting rights, and so the population was restricted to the two municipalities Bay Lake and Lake Buena Vista.

=== Further development ===
After Walt Disney died in 1966, the Disney company board decided that it did not want to be in the business of running a city, and abandoned many of his ideas for Progress City. The planned residential areas that Walt originally advocated for were never built. Richard Foglesong would later argue in his 2003 book, Married to the Mouse: Walt Disney World and Orlando, that the Disney company abused its powers by remaining in complete control of the District.

In 1968, the Reedy Creek Improvement Act was held by the Supreme Court of Florida not to violate any provision of the state constitution. As the law, in part, declares that the District is exempt from all state land use regulation laws "now or hereafter enacted," the attorney general of Florida issued in 1977 an opinion stating that this includes state requirements for developments of regional impact (DRIs).

In January 1990, the RCID was granted a $57-million allocation of tax-free state bonds over an agency with plans for a low-income housing development and all additional government applicants in a six-county region, as the state distributed the bond proceeds on a first-come order. Disney was criticized for the move, with a Republican gubernatorial candidate filing a lawsuit to stop the RCID from using the funds. Also, one state legislator moved to limit the RCID's ability to apply for the program.

In 1993, the land that eventually became the Disney-controlled town of Celebration, Florida—which was built with many of Walt Disney's original ideas that had since evolved into a form of New Urbanism—was deannexed from Bay Lake and the district. This was done to keep its residents from having power over Disney by providing for separate administration of the areas. Celebration lies on unincorporated land within Osceola County, with a thin strip of still-incorporated land separating it from the rest of the county. This strip of land contains canals and other land used by the district.

=== Abolition ===
On March 30, 2022, state representative Spencer Roach tweeted that Florida legislators had met twice within the past week to discuss the possibility of repealing the Reedy Creek Improvement Act and stripping Disney of its "special privileges" in the state. Roach and Florida governor Ron DeSantis later criticized Disney for the "special perks" the company enjoyed through use of the RCID. Roach said there had been previous attempts to eliminate the district. A bill analysis and fiscal impact statement for the bill was created on April 19, 2022, by Senator Jennifer Bradley. However, this analysis was unable to determine the impact the bill would have on either the residents served by the special district, or the local governments that would absorb the district's debts.

On April 20, 2022, the Florida Senate passed Senate Bill 4C (SB 4C) with a 23–16 vote that would abolish the special taxing district. If it became law, the bill would dissolve any independent special district in Florida established prior to November 5, 1968, including the RCID; the dissolution would take effect June 1, 2023.

Representative Randy Fine sponsored a bill in the Florida House of Representatives to dissolve all six independent special districts in Florida established prior to November 5, 1968 (the date of the ratification of the Constitution of Florida), including the Reedy Creek Improvement District (RCID). On April 21, 2022, the bill was passed by the Florida House by a 70–38 vote. DeSantis signed the bill into law the following day. Some members of the Florida Legislature as well as political commentators said the bill was likely retaliation for Disney announcing its opposition to the Parental Rights in Education Act, dubbed by critics as the "Don't Say Gay bill". Representative Dotie Joseph dubbed SB 4C "un-American" adding that it was "[p]unishing a company for daring to speak against a governor's radical-right political agenda".

The bill which abolished the district did not have any provisions for the logistics or debt. Under its enabling act, the state vowed to bondholders that it wouldn't impair the ability of Reedy Creek to service its debt. By dissolving the district, the debt would have been subsumed by Orange and Osceola Counties. On May 16, 2022, Florida governor DeSantis said that he is looking into making the government take control of the special district but promised that local and state tax payers would not be paying for Reedy Creek's outstanding debt.

In 2023, DeSantis announced he would rename the district to Central Florida Tourism Oversight District instead of dissolving it, and replace five-board members which had been selected by Disney, with a new board with five members hand-picked by the governor. This was approved by the Florida state legislature on February 9 and 10, 2023. The bill was signed by Governor DeSantis on February 27.

==== Potential repercussions ====
The bill was passed after two days of discussions and without a fiscal impact analysis. This led to debates about the bill's effects on taxes and bond debt. Randy Fine, the Republican House sponsor of the bill, claimed a different type of district could be formed that would not move additional costs to taxpayers.

Disney already pays property taxes to Orange and Osceola counties. The bill would not increase these counties' revenues but would force both counties to increase services within the former jurisdiction of the RCID. A tax collector for Orange County claimed the RCID's abolition would increase costs for taxpayers. Florida Senate Democratic member Gary Farmer also highlighted concerns that the dissolution would transfer over $1 billion in bond liabilities to all Florida taxpayers.

==== Potential legal challenges ====
Analysts expected legal challenges to the dissolution. One argument was that because the law targeted Disney in retaliation for a political position, it violated the company's free speech rights under the First Amendment to the United States Constitution.

Another argument is that the dissolution violates the contract the state of Florida made with bondholders not to alter or limit the powers of the district until all bonds were paid off, making the dissolution unconstitutional under the Contract Clause. Under Florida law, when a special district government, like the Reedy Creek Improvement District, is dissolved, the dissolution transfers "title to all property owned by the preexisting special district government to the local general-purpose government, which shall also assume all indebtedness of the preexisting special district." In 1866, the U.S. Supreme Court ruled that "once a local government issues a bond based on an authorized taxing power, the state is contract-bound and cannot eliminate the taxing power supporting the bond".

Local taxpayers did file suit in federal court, but this was dismissed in May 2022 for lack of standing for the First Amendment issue, and lack of demonstrated injury to the taxpayers. It was refiled in state court the same month.

==== Reorganization ====
On December 2, 2022, the Financial Times reported that a deal between Representative Randy Fine, the Disney company and other members of the Florida state legislature was underway to keep the main Reedy Creek Improvement District agreement, since the District abolition law had yet to take effect. Such compromise was reportedly being drafted especially because former Disney CEO Bob Chapek, who openly opposed the Parental Rights in Education law, was fired, and the abolition of the District would represent a tax increase in cities and counties across Florida, which could endanger Governor DeSantis' nomination for the Republican Party in the 2024 presidential election.

Concerns over possible debt transfer to counties, and taxpayers in Orange and Osceola Counties having to start paying for some Disney World services such as police, fire protection and road maintenance, led the legislature to mostly revert the changes. On February 9 and 10, 2023, the Florida State House and Senate, respectively, passed bills in a special session allowing the special tax district to remain, as well as leaving the ability for Disney to issue tax-exempt bonds and approve development plans without scrutiny from certain local regulators in place. Disney would no longer be able to appoint the five members of the tax district's board, which would instead be appointed by the governor and confirmed by the Florida State Senate, and some parts of the district's authority would be removed, such as the power to potentially construct a nuclear power plant, airport, and stadium. Governor DeSantis signed the bill on February 27.

== Geography ==
Reedy Creek is a natural waterway whose flow, drainage, and destination have been altered over the years by human development. It begins west of the Bay Lake city limits and the Magic Kingdom, and then meanders south through Disney property, passing between Disney's Animal Kingdom and Blizzard Beach. It crosses Interstate 4 and exits Disney property west of Celebration and runs mostly through undeveloped territory east of Haines City. It empties into Lake Russell, and continues flowing southward into Cypress Lake, which is connected to the Kissimmee Chain of Lakes.

== Governance ==
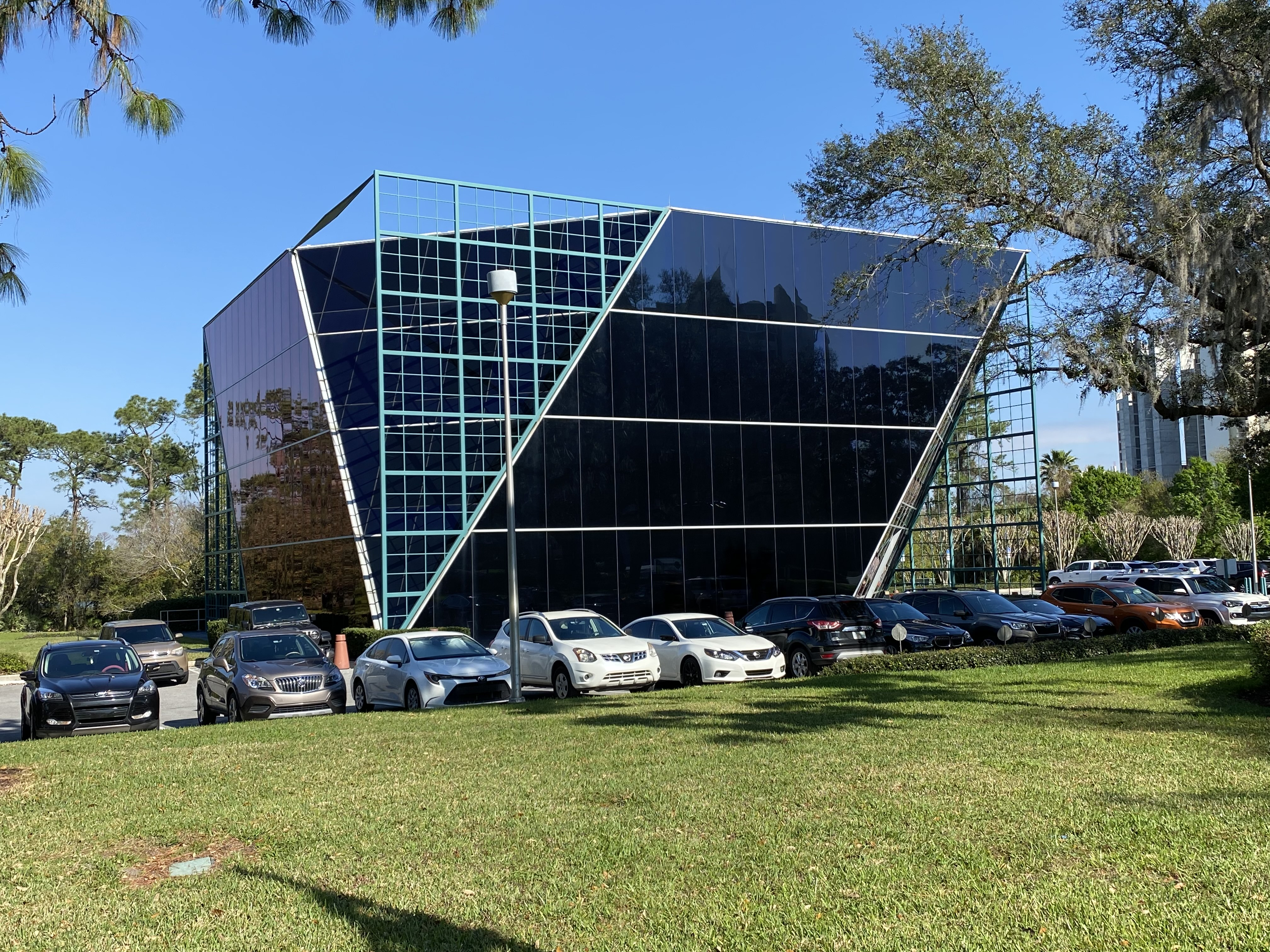
Reedy Creek Improvement District Office in Lake Buena Vista

The district is governed by a five-member Board of Supervisors. Each supervisor is appointed by the governor of Florida and confirmed by the Florida Senate. Supervisors serve for terms of four years, and may serve for up to three consecutive terms. Any individual currently or within the past three years employed by a theme park or entertainment company is prohibited from serving as a supervisor. The members appointed to the board following changes to the district in 2023, subject to Senate confirmation, are as follows:

- Alexis Yarbrough
- Bridget Ziegler
- Brian Aungst Jr.
- John Gilbert
- Scott Workman

Concerns arose after the nominations, as all five proposed members are allies of Ron DeSantis, have donated to his political campaigns, or are active in other right-wing circles. Ziegler founded Moms for Liberty, a conservative group promoting "anti-woke" school policies and board members, and was a primary proponent of the Parental Rights in Education Act. Her husband was elected to lead the Republican Party of Florida shortly before the governance changes to the district went into effect. Martin Garcia, the proposed new chairperson of the board, donated $50,000 to DeSantis' political action committee, and according to Forbes, "was also named in court testimony as having been consulted when DeSantis' administration was preparing to suspend local prosecutor Andrew Warren for espousing pro-abortion rights views". Ron Peri runs The Gathering USA, a conservative Christian ministry for men in Florida, and previously claimed "estrogen in the water from birth control pills" has contributed to a rise in homosexuality, and has called homosexuality "shameful", "deviant", and that it was a cause of decline for the Roman Empire. Michael Sasso runs the Orlando chapter of the conservative Federalist Society, and Brian Aungst Jr. is a conservative Pinellas County attorney previously appointed to the 6th Circuit judicial nominating commission.

Over the course of two public meetings, with the second on the day before the new Central Florida Tourism Oversight District was to take control, the Walt Disney Company and the Reedy Creek Improvement District signed a development agreement. This enacted restrictive covenants to limit the Improvement District's governing power over Disney properties, which include Walt Disney World. According to Peri, "This essentially makes Disney the government. This board loses, for practical purposes, the majority of its ability to do anything beyond maintain the roads and maintain basic infrastructure." The agreement stated that, if a perpetual term is deemed invalid, a royal lives clause would be used in its place: namely, the agreement "shall continue until twenty-one (21) years after the death of the last survivor of the descendants of King Charles III, king of England [sic], living as of the date of this agreement."

=== Former governance structure ===
Before the passage of House Bill 9 in 2023 (HB 9 2023), the Board of Supervisors was elected by the landowners of the District, who receive one vote per acre of land. As the majority landowner in Reedy Creek, The Walt Disney Company essentially handpicked the members of the Board. Under this model, each member owned an undeveloped five-acre (2.0 ha) lot of land within the District—the only land in the District not technically controlled by Disney or used for public road purposes.

The District headquarters are in a building in Lake Buena Vista, east of Disney Springs. The District runs the following services, primarily serving Disney:

- Law enforcement – Officers from Orange County, Osceola County, and the Florida Highway Patrol are contracted to police the district. Arrests are made and citations are issued by the Florida Highway Patrol or the Orange County and Osceola County sheriffs deputies. In addition, the Walt Disney Company employs about 800 security staff in their Disney Safety and Security division, which maintains a fleet of private security Chevrolet Equinoxes equipped with flashing amber and green lights, flares, traffic cones, and chalk commonly used by police officers.
  Disney security personnel are involved with traffic control and may only issue personnel violation notices to Disney and RCID employees, not the general public. Security vans previously had red lightbars, but after public scrutiny following the death of Robb Sipkema, were changed to amber to fall in line with Florida State Statutes.
- Environmental protection: Many pieces of land have been donated to the Florida Department of Environmental Regulation and the South Florida Water Management District as conservation easements, and the District collects data and ensures that large portions remain in their natural wetland state.
- Building codes and land-use planning: The "EPCOT Building Codes" were implemented to provide the sort of flexibility that the innovative community of EPCOT would require. Still, most of the standards and design parameters are those of the Florida Building Code, which is based on the International Building Code (IBC). Although the codes are ostensibly updated on a three-year cycle, the most recent and currently used version of the EPCOT Building Codes is the 2024 version, enacted in 2025. Today's RCID buildings are built to withstand 110 mph (180 km/h) winds.
- Utilities: Wastewater treatment and collection, water reclamation, electric generation and distribution, solid waste disposal, potable water, natural gas distribution, and hot and chilled water distribution are managed through Reedy Creek Energy Services, which has been merged with the Walt Disney World Company
- Roads: Many of the main roads in the District are public roads maintained by the District, while minor roads and roads dead-ending at attractions are private roads maintained by Disney; in addition, state-maintained Interstate 4 and U.S. Highway 192 pass through the District, as does part of the right-of-way of County Road 535 (formerly State Road 535).

Disney provides transportation for guests and employees in the form of buses, ferries, and monorails, under the name Disney Transport. In addition, several Lynx public bus routes enter the District, with half-hour service between the Transportation and Ticket Center (and backstage areas at the Magic Kingdom) and Downtown Orlando and Kissimmee, and once-a-day service to more points, intended mainly for cleaning staff. Half-hourly service is provided, via Lynx, to Orlando International Airport (MCO).

== Fire department ==
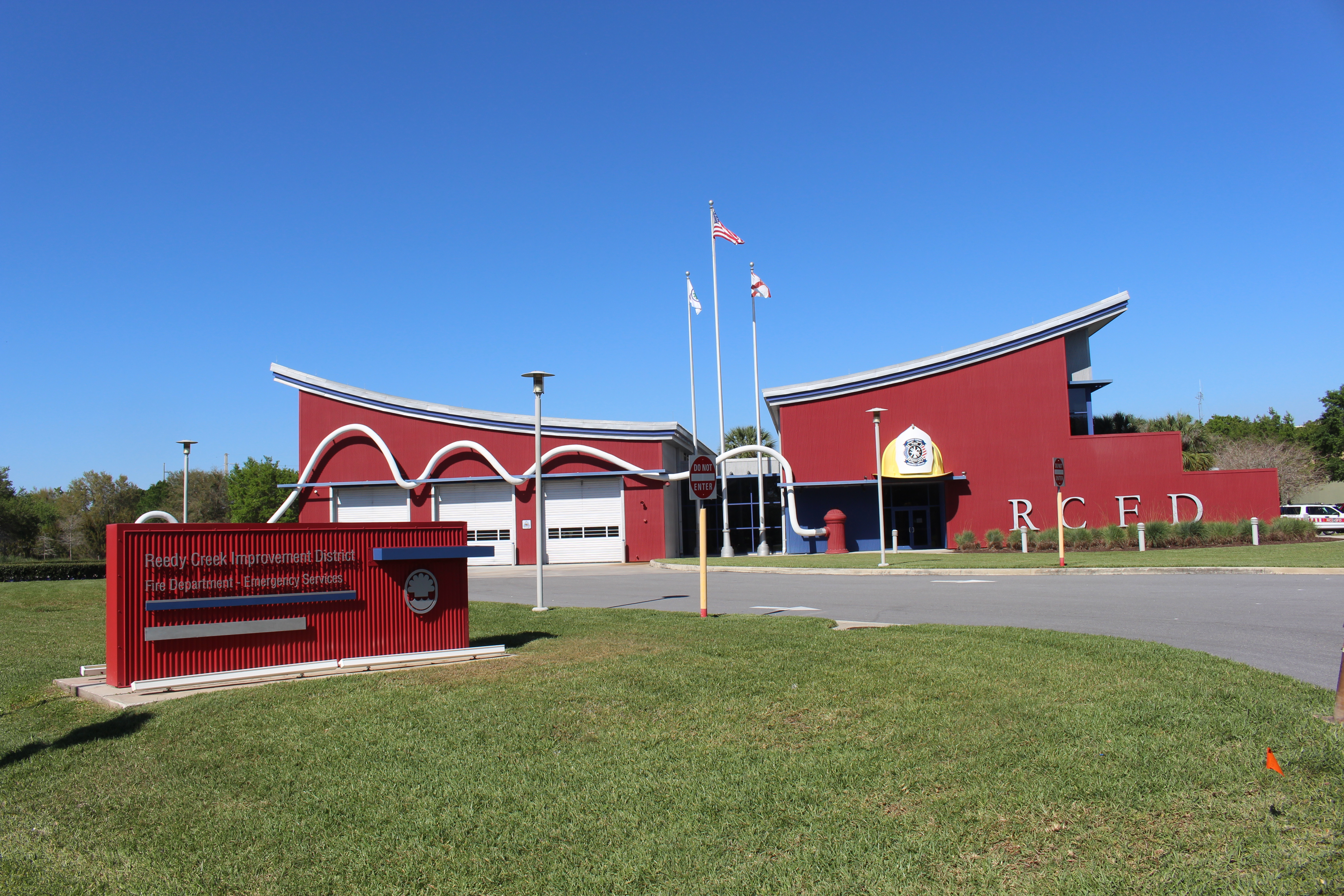
Fire Station 4 in Lake Buena Vista

The Reedy Creek Fire Department (RCFD) was created in 1968 to provide fire suppression for RCID. Later, RCFD provides fire suppression, emergency medical services, 911 communications, fire inspections, technical rescue services, and hazardous materials mitigation. EMS makes up approximately 85 percent of the call volume, with RCFD providing both Advanced Life Support and Basic Life Support. Its name was changed to District Fire Department (DFD) in 2024.

The Fire Department currently staffs four fire stations located throughout the district with 138 personnel across three shifts. They also maintain a staff of 86 administrative and support personnel including EMS team members (primarily located in each of the four Walt Disney World theme parks), 911 communicators, and fire inspectors. There are four engines, two tower trucks, one squad unit, eight rescue ambulances, and several special units.

== See also ==
- Florida tourism industry
