= Richard Foglesong =

American political scientist

Richard E. Foglesong is an American historian and political scientist who focuses on Florida and U.S. politics, New Urbanism and the politics of urban development, Hispanic politics, and the history of Walt Disney World and the Reedy Creek Improvement District. He is the George and Harriet Cornell Professor of Politics, emeritus at Rollins College.

== Education and career ==
Foglesong earned his M.A. in urban affairs and his Ph.D. in political science at the University of Chicago, where he was a Ford Foundation Urban Fellow. He began his teaching career at Amherst College, and joined Rollins College in 1984. In 1990, he went on leave from Rollins to take a temporary appointment at the University of California, Los Angeles, as the Harvey Perloff Professor of Urban Planning. He retired in 2018.

== Books ==
Foglesong's books include:

- Planning the Capitalist City: The Colonial Era to the 1920s (Princeton University Press, 1986)
- Married to the Mouse: Walt Disney World and Orlando (Yale University Press, 2001)
- Immigrant Prince: Mel Martinez and the American Dream (University Press, of Florida, 2011)
