= COVID-19 pandemic in Florida =

- Disease: COVID-19
- Pathogen: SARS-CoV-2
- Location: Florida, U.S.
- Index case: Hillsborough County, Manatee County
- Arrival date: March 1, 2020
- Confirmed cases: 7,574,590
- Hospitalized cases: 95,210 (Note: The "hospitalizations" figure released by the Florida Department of Health "is a count of all laboratory confirmed cases in which an inpatient hospitalization occurred at any time during the course of illness. These people may no longer be hospitalized.")
- Deaths: 86,850
- Fatality rate: 0.25% (residents); 1.7% (non-residents); 1.62% (total)

Government website
- floridahealthcovid19.gov

On March 1, 2020, the U.S. state of Florida officially reported its first two COVID-19 cases in Manatee and Hillsborough counties. There is evidence, however, that community spread of COVID-19 first began in Florida much earlier, perhaps as early as the first week of January, with as many as 171 people in Florida who had shown symptoms now identified with COVID-19, prior to receiving confirmation from the Centers for Disease Control and Prevention. By March 11, the CDC saw evidence to conclude that community spread of the virus had occurred within the state.

On April 1, 2020, Governor Ron DeSantis issued an executive order to restrict activities within the state to those deemed as essential services. By June 2020, DeSantis had adopted a more targeted approach to the pandemic, declaring in mid-June that,

"We're not shutting down, we're gonna go forward, we're gonna continue to protect the most vulnerable....particularly when you have a virus that disproportionately impacts one segment of society, to suppress a lot of working-age people at this point I don't think would likely be very effective."

That targeted approach was similar to what the Great Barrington Declaration would recommend later in October. DeSantis got vaccinated voluntarily against COVID-19 and expressed enthusiasm for people getting their shots, but he has also opposed forcing people to do it.

On September 25, 2020, Florida lifted all remaining capacity restrictions on businesses, while also prohibiting local governments from enforcing public health orders with fines, or restricting restaurants to less than 50% capacity. According to the federal Centers for Disease Control, life expectancy during 2020 dropped in Florida to 77.5 years, down from 79 years in 2019; that fall of 1.5 years in Florida compared to a nationwide fall of 1.8 years, "mostly due to the COVID-19 pandemic and increases in unintentional injuries," with those unintentional deaths being mostly attributable to drug overdoses.

As of September 16, 2021, the Florida Department of Health had reported 3,485,163 COVID-19 cases (Note: 16.92% of the population of Florida, or 1 out of 5.91. Florida's COVID-19 Dashboard reports the population as 20,598,139.) and 51,240 deaths (Note: 0.25% of the population of Florida, or 1 out of 401.99. Florida's COVID-19 Dashboard reports the population as 20,598,139.) among residents of the state. Since the start of the pandemic through November 2022, 324 in 100,000 Floridians died of COVID-19. As of December 2021, among all US states Florida had the eighth-highest per capita case rate. As of July 2021, one in every five new COVID-19 cases recorded in the United States came from Florida. Vaccines have been administered in Florida since December 14, 2020. As of May 2, 2021, Florida has administered 15,488,105 COVID-19 vaccine doses with 42% of the population having received at least one shot and 30% of the population being fully vaccinated.

Since 2021, Governor Ron DeSantis has placed restrictions on the use of COVID-19 mitigations by local governments and private businesses via executive order; the state has expressly voided and restricted any future restrictions imposed by local governments, prohibited any mandate applying to COVID-19 vaccines (including COVID-19 vaccination as a condition of entry or employment), and has controversially prohibited local governments and school boards from mandating that face masks be worn at schools—a policy which resulted in legal disputes.

As of Tuesday, April 19, 2022, more than 14,342,000 people had been fully vaccinated in Florida. On that date, the state had logged at least 5,888,264 cases and 73,738 deaths since the pandemic began in March 2020.

On February 15, 2023, the Florida Department of Health published a safety alert from the State Surgeon General Joseph Ladapo warning of "a novel increase" in adverse event reports related to mRNA-based COVID-19 vaccines.

== Timeline ==
=== Initial cases (January–May 2020) ===
February 29, 2020: Florida state health laboratories in Tampa, Jacksonville, and Miami are able to process COVID-19 tests locally rather than sending them to federal labs, cutting processing time from 3–5 days to 1–2 days.

March 1: Florida becomes the tenth state to confirm its first COVID-19 cases: one in Manatee County, and one in Hillsborough County with a woman who had recently returned from Italy.

March 3: The Florida Department of Health sets up a 24-hour COVID-19 hotline. A third presumptive positive case in Hillsborough County is reported.

March 5: A new case is announced involving an elderly man with severe underlying health conditions in Santa Rosa County who had recently traveled outside the United States. The Department of Health announces three new cases late on March 6, two in Broward County and one in Lee County. Officials also announce two deaths.

March 8: Publix starts to limit the amount of certain items per customer because some shoppers began to hoard items like toilet paper and other essential items.

March 9: Florida House members announce that five members attended a conference with infected COVID-19 participants. Governor DeSantis declares a State of Emergency. Princess Cruises terminates a planned stop of the cruise ship Caribbean Princess in Grand Cayman after it was discovered that two of its crew members had recently transferred from Grand Princess in California. The cruise ship is ordered to anchor off the coast of Fort Lauderdale while its passengers and crew could be tested for COVID-19. Furthermore, a fourth Princess Cruises cruise ship, Regal Princess, is placed on a "no sail order" off the Florida coast after it was discovered that two of its crew members had recently transferred from Grand Princess in California.

March 11: UF Health Shands Hospital confirm they are treating their first patient with a case of COVID-19, but decline to say whether it was the same person who tested positive for the virus earlier in the week. The Centers for Disease Control and Prevention (CDC) award Florida $27 million to help quell the pandemic.

March 13: It is confirmed that Mayor of Miami Francis Suarez had contracted the virus. The Department of Health confirms that an Orange County resident died in California after contracting COVID-19 while traveling.

March 14: Orlando International Airport confirms that one of its Transportation Security Administration (TSA) agents had tested positive for COVID-19, bringing the total of TSA agents across the United States to have the virus to five after four other TSA agents at Mineta San Jose International Airport in California tested positive.

March 17: Governor DeSantis orders bars and nightclubs to close for 30 days, gyms announce that they would be closing, and the first medical group offers drive through COVID-19 testing in Central Florida.

March 18: Nineteen senior living facilities are suspected to be infected by the coronavirus. The state purchases 2,500 testing kits. In addition, congressman Mario Diaz-Balart from Miami tests positive for the coronavirus. After his diagnosis, he self-quarantines in his Washington, D.C. apartment.

March 20: A Pasco and a Broward County resident dies. A man who returned to California after visiting Walt Disney World and Universal Orlando approximately two weeks prior dies from the virus. DeSantis orders that restaurants use take-out and delivery only to prevent guests from eating at restaurants.

March 30: Although Florida law does not allow retired state personnel to return to work until six months after their retirement, DeSantis makes an exception and allows the retired healthcare and front line workers to come back to work In addition, he signs an Executive Order for Miami-Dade County, Broward County and Palm Beach County residents to stay at home. The Department of Education announces that schools will not be able to resume in person classes until at least May 1. After learning that some patients were leaving isolation and going out in public, the Seminole County requires those who were diagnosed with COVID-19 to stay at home until medically cleared.

April 1: DeSantis issues a statewide stay-at-home order following growing pressure to do so.

April 12: The Tampa Bay Times reported a discrepancy between the counts of COVID-19 deaths in the state: the Florida Department of Health had reported 419, while Florida's medical examiners reported 461. The health department counts only Florida residents and organizes the data by the person's place of residence (to avoid double-counting); in contrast, the medical examiners count anyone who dies in the state, which includes visitors. The health department's analysis causes several days of reporting delay, which is a further reason it is difficult to compare the numbers. In response to the Tampa Bay Times article, Florida officials stopped the release of the medical examiners' list, saying that it should be reviewed and possibly redacted, but did not publicly specify what exactly they wanted to redact.

April 17: DeSantis allows some Florida beaches to reopen if done safely.

April 18 It is announced that schools would remain closed for the remainder of the semester.

April 20: The Florida Department of Economic Opportunities releases a dashboard showing that 1.5 million unemployment claims were made during the last month. The Florida National Guard assists with COVID-19 sample collections at a State Nursing home for Veterans in Pembroke Pines. In addition, they have helped across Florida in more than 50,000 COVID-19 tests and numerous screenings at airports.

April 21: Flagler County announces its beaches would reopen for exercising and fishing but not socializing, and the sunbathing restriction was lifted on Brevard County.

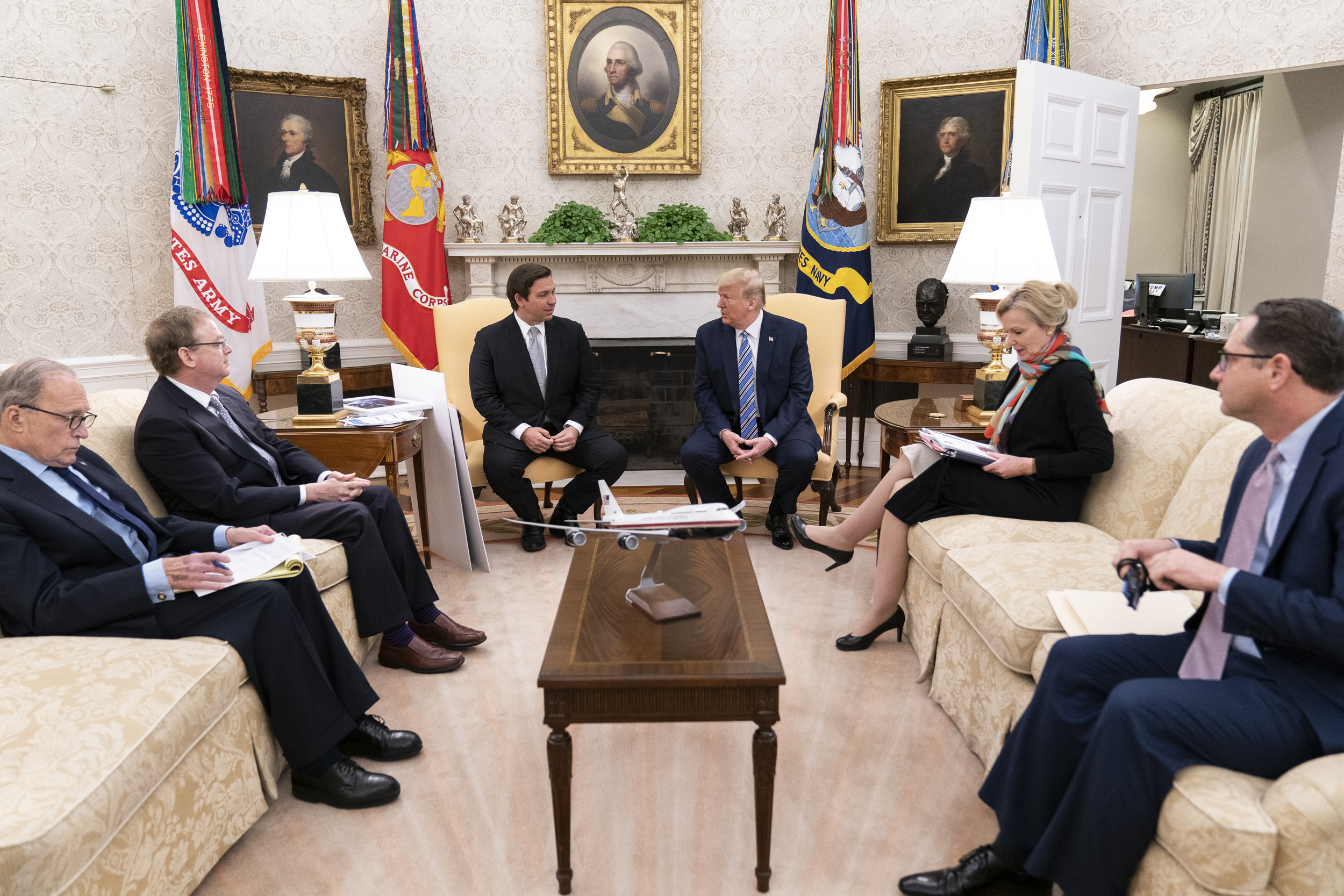
Governor Ron DeSantis met with U.S. president Donald Trump in the Oval Office on April 28, 2020 to discuss the pandemic.

May 4: The state of Florida removed 171 presumed COVID-19 cases with onset in January and February from its official COVID-19 database. The individuals were subsequently all still counted after they tested positive with CDC confirmation.

May 5: Rebekah Jones, a geographic data scientist involved in tracking cases for the state, is terminated from her position by the Florida Department of Health. Jones claimed that the Department of Health wanted data on Florida's coronavirus dashboard changed to support Governor Ron DeSantis' plans to resume economic activity. She further contended that she was fired for refusing to alter the information. A statement from DeSantis' office denied this, instead claiming that she was fired for insubordination and unilateral decision-making regarding her dashboard additions. DeSantis added that Jones contradicted state epidemiologists. In May 2021, Jones was granted whistleblower protection by the Florida Commission of Human Resources, but the investigation found allegations of retaliatory adverse action unsubstantiated and was closed in September 2022. Jones posted a forged version of the notice of termination she received claiming the commission found she disclosed and demonstrated violations of Florida Statutes and qualified her termination as legitimate and non-retaliatory under Florida Statute that classified her as employment as Selected Exempt Service, making her employment at-will. The authentic letter provided by the commission made no such claims. The Office of Inspector General later found her claims to be unsubstantiated or unfounded; those she accused were exonerated of any misconduct.

May 17: Monroe County commissioners vote for a mask mandate that requires all employees and customers of businesses to wear masks.

May 18: Broward County and Miami-Dade County enter Phase One of reopening.

May 22: The Miami Beach City Commission votes that Miami-Dade hotels and beaches reopen by June 1, but that did not happen.

May 27: Ocean Drive on Miami Beach is closed off to allow restaurants to expand their seating. People are to along the sidewalks and in the closed off streets to maximize the restaurant capacities.

=== First rise of cases (June–September 2020) ===
June 1: The Florida Keys reopened and lifted the roadblock. Earlier in May, in a virtual round table, Miami-Dade Emergency Manager Frank Rollason said the county plans to test everyone coming into a shelter for COVID-19 and separate people who are ill or have symptoms from healthy people in different parts of the shelter. June 1, he contradicted himself in an email and said the county plans to screen evacuees for symptoms, not test them. The state hopes to have rapid testing by August or September and to be able to test people entering and exiting shelters by then.

June 3: DeSantis announces that Florida could move into Phase 2 except south Florida, specifically Miami-Dade, Broward, and Palm Beach, which need to submit plans for reopening. Phase 2 in Florida begins, with bars allowed to open at 50% capacity with social distancing and sanitation.

June 10: Miami Beach reopens with social distancing guidelines.

June 14: An alternate website for tracking COVID-19 cases in Florida, created by Rebekah Jones, debuted. In an interview with NPR, she claims that in the current Florida Health dashboard, positive tests are only counted once per person but a person who tests negative multiple times is counted towards the data every time. She states that reporting positivity as a percentage of total tests instead of as a percentage of the total population tested lowers the reported COVID-19 positivity rate.

June 16: Hawkers St. Pete restaurant in St. Petersburg temporary shuts down until further notice due to a spike of cases in the city and Pinellas County. An ice hockey game in the Tampa Bay metropolitan area led to 14 of the 22 players and a rink staff member testing positive for COVID-19.

June 19: A mandatory mask mandate goes into effect in Tampa. It applies to all indoor locations outside of one's home and anywhere in public where one cannot maintain social distancing. Those who are under the age of 2 are exempt from it.

A mask mandate that applies to businesses in St. Petersburg goes into effect.

June 21: The dashboard created by Rebekah Jones says that "the DOH "Cases" include residents and non-residents, but exclude those who received positive anti-body test results".

June 23: A 17-year old from Lee County who attended a 100-person church function dies from COVID-19. The teenager had been treated at home with azithromycin, hydroxychloroquine, and oxygen before being transferred to the Golisano Children's Hospital then to the Nicklaus Children's Hospital in Miami.

June 24: The daily positive test rate reaches 20%. New York, New Jersey and Connecticut impose 14-day quarantines on visitors from states with infection rates above a certain threshold, including Florida. A study by Scripps Research Institute reports that COVID-19 may be mutating in Florida, making the virus more likely to infect cells.

During the month of June the seven day moving average of new COVID-19 cases in Florida increased nearly ten-fold, from 726 new cases per day on June 1 to 7,140 new cases on July 1, 2020.

July 2: Florida's Department of Health stated that test results starting July 2 would include antigen test results received from the state public health laboratory and commercial and hospital laboratories.

July 3: An 11-year-old boy from Miami-Dade County dies from COVID-19 complications, making him the youngest person in Florida to die from COVID-19.

July 7: More than 40 Florida hospitals maxed out or were nearing capacity of their intensive care unit beds.

July 12: 15,299 new COVID-19 cases are reported by the state, the highest daily amount during the pandemic.

July 14: Miami is declared the worst hit locale in the state by Dr Lilian Abbo, chief of infection prevention at Jackson Health System.

July 24: A longtime staffer of Rep. Vern Buchanan died of the disease after being hospitalized 9 days previously.

July 27: Manatee County commissioners vote to approve an ordinance requiring masks to be worn inside private businesses. It does not apply to those who are under the age of 6 and with certain medical conditions.

July 30: 253 deaths are reported, the highest daily count during the pandemic.

Between July 30 and August 5, many state-run test sites were closed due to Hurricane Isaías. Test sites in some western counties not in the hurricane's path remained open but state-run sites in Miami-Dade, Orange and other higher population eastern counties were closed until Monday, August 3, with some sites reopening before the scheduled full reopening on Wednesday, August 5. The interruption of full daily testing would lead to a dip in confirmed cases for several days.

August 24: 52 nursing home residents at Fair Havens Center in Miami Springs died during a COVID-19 outbreak at the center. Acting on five complaints against the center, Florida's Agency for Health Care Administration (AHCA) conducted in inspection that found numerous issues and the Agency shut down new admissions to the center. A certified nursing assistant was infected at the center in April, her husband and son became infected, and her 33-year-old son died in May.

September 1: The Florida Department of Health and Division of Emergency Management announced a severing of ties with Quest Diagnostics, after the private laboratory failed to report nearly 75,000 tests to the state before that day, including some tests from as far back as April. Of the 7,643 positive cases reported on September 1, 3,870 were collected by Quest between April 22 and August 27.

September 24: Governor DeSantis suggested a "bill of rights" to protect college students from being expelled for attending parties that violate their school's COVID-19 rules.

September 25: DeSantis issued an order that effectively nullified public health measures imposed by various local governments in Florida to combat the spread of the virus. DeSantis's order prohibits local governments from imposing fines or shutting down businesses for violations of mask mandates. The order also allows restaurants to immediately reopen at full capacity and restricted local governments from ordering restaurants to operate at less than half-capacity. On November 24, amid an increase in the number of COVID-19 cases and deaths in the state throughout the autumn, DeSantis extended this order.

September 25: Tallahassee police broke up a dozen large gatherings over the weekend. This included a party of more than 1,000 people near Florida State University. Over 1,400 positive cases had been identified at Florida State between August 2 and September 26.

September 25: In reaction to a brutal break up of a party near FSU, Gov. Ron DeSantis proposes college 'bill of rights' to party.

September 27: Manatee County commissioners vote to end a countywide mask mandate.

September 28: Dr. Anthony Fauci said that the decision to reopen bars and restaurants at 100% capacity, and to prohibit localities from limiting business capacity to less than 50% was "very concerning" and "really asking for trouble."

September 29: Governor DeSantis announced that the state will receive over six million rapid antigen tests for COVID-19, which typically provide results within fifteen minutes. The tests will initially be made available to long-term and senior care facilities, with the intention to later expand to schools. The state expected the first shipment of tests arrive by October 2. A sharp rise in cases, with 3,259 reported, occurred that day, which followed 813 cases reported the day before, the lowest daily count in months. Test positivity for the day was 4.98%; the day before was at 4.21%.

=== Second rise of cases (October 2020 – January 2021) ===
October 10, 2020: A daily report of test results was not provided. The Florida Department of Health explained that results provided by Helix Laboratory on Friday evening included nearly 400,000 previously submitted results. The Department of Health stated that the results would be provided by the next day, after the data was reconciled.

October 14: The Florida-LSU football game was postponed until December. A total of 19 players for the Gators tested positive, as did coach Dan Mullen, who had urged that fans be allowed to pack the stadium.

October 17: Florida reported its highest coronavirus numbers in two months. The seven-day average was more than 3,300 cases. Reporting anomalies made it more difficult to gather statistical trends. Positivity rate was 5.2%, with over 2,000 hospitalizations.

October 19: With tourist season approaching, rising cases were reported in the Florida Keys, with 201 cases in the past 14 days, and a 7% positive test rate.

October 22: WUFT reported that Florida universities "have received scores of formal complaints from students about their own classmates' behavior during the pandemic," such as packing bars off campus and holding parties without masks or social distancing. Governor DeSantis defended the practice of holding Thanksgiving gatherings for the elderly in long-term care facilities, despite the potential health risks.

October 23: Florida reported 16,500 deaths, and moved past New Jersey to become 4th in the nation in the number of deaths.

October 24: A Florida Department of Health official in Orange County urged parents not to host birthday parties of any size, after half of the 30 attendees at an Orlando area birthday party contracted the virus.

December 7: Florida Department of Law Enforcement (FDLE) agents raided the home of Rebekah Jones.

December 14: United Airlines flight 591 departed from Orlando with 164 people on board for a 5.5 hour flight to Los Angeles, California. A 69-year-old man had respiratory distress on the flight, was given CPR, and the flight was diverted to New Orleans, Louisiana. The man died at a hospital, and his cause of death was listed as "acute respiratory failure; COVID-19". An emergency medical technician who performed the CPR later reported COVID-19 symptoms but received three negative test results. Two other passengers also took turns in performing chest compressions. A bag valve mask was used to provide oxygen, and there was no mouth-to-mouth resuscitation performed.

December 17: The State of Florida reported 13,148 new cases, largest since July 16.

December 31: A confirmed case of the new SARS-CoV-2 variant from the United Kingdom was reported in Florida. The patient is a Martin County man with no travel history.

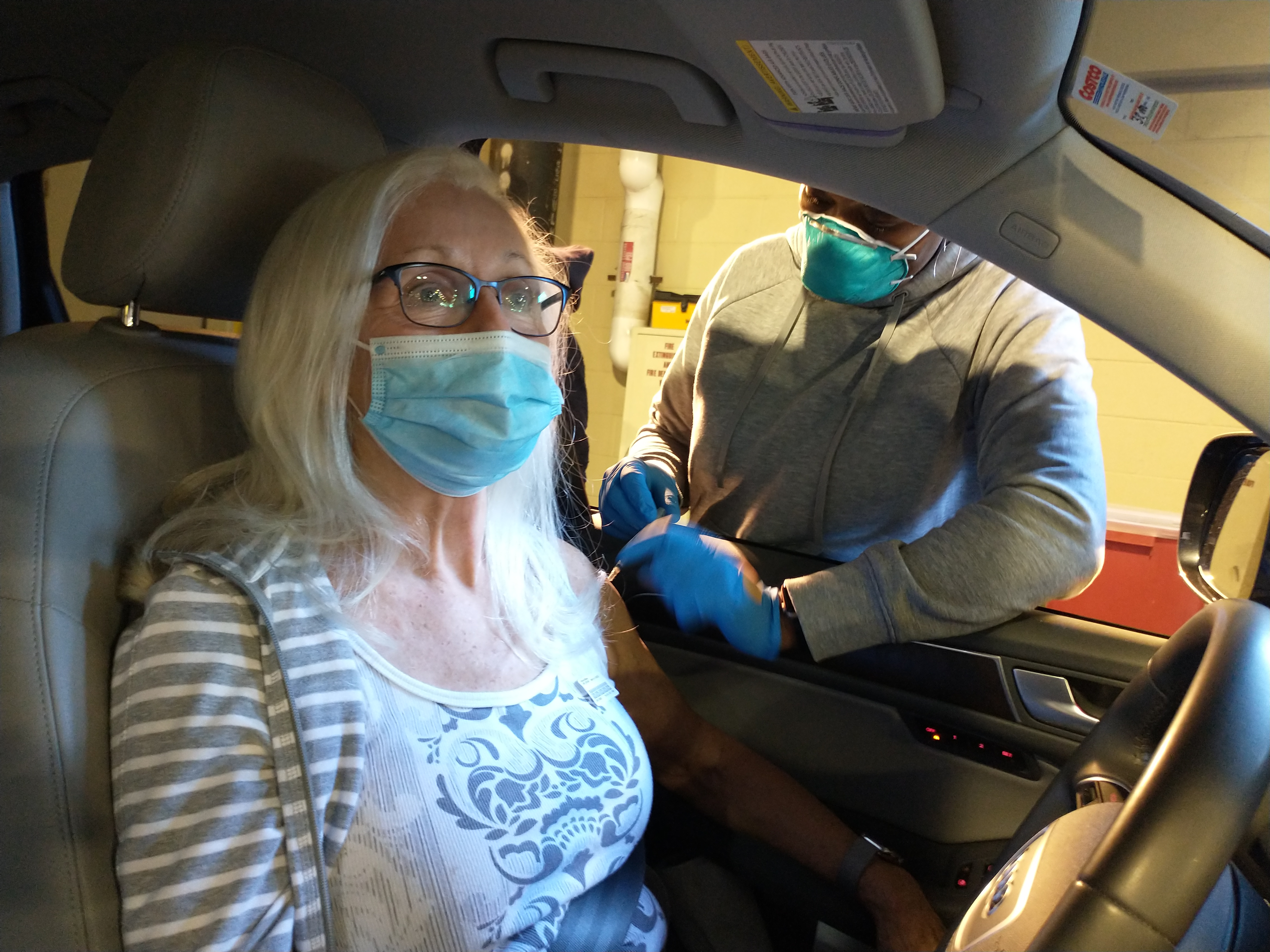
A woman receives the COVID-19 vaccine on January 16, 2021, at the Orange County Convention Center.

January 6, 2021: The CDC announced that it had found at least 22 confirmed cases of the more contagious SARS-CoV-2 variant in Florida.

=== Cases since January 2021 (February–August 2021) ===
July 31: Florida recorded 21,683 new cases in one day, the highest at any time in the pandemic. Florida's test positivity rate reached 18.82%, driven by the delta variant of COVID-19.

August 6: The state continued to break records with 23,909 new cases on Friday, August 6, according to the CDC.

August 8: The pastor of a Jacksonville church stated that six church members had died of COVID-19 within the previous two weeks.

=== Omicron surge (December 2021 – February 2022) ===
December 7, 2021: Florida reported its first confirmed case of the Omicron variant of COVID-19.

January 2022: Driven by the Omicron variant, Florida experienced its largest single-week surge of the entire pandemic. The state averaged nearly 57,000 confirmed COVID-19 infections per day for the week ending January 6, 2022, and the new-case positivity rate for that week hit 31.2%, the highest recorded during the pandemic. Florida's all-time single-day record was set when 77,156 cases were assigned to a single day during this period.

== Response ==
Timeline for State Government Response
Date	Action Taken
March 1, 2020	Public health emergency declared.
March 17, 2020	All bars and nightclubs ordered to close for 30 days.
March 17, 2020	School closures extended to April 15, and state-mandated school testing cancelled.
March 28, 2020	Emergency alert sent to cell phones throughout Florida from the state's Surgeon General regarding public safety.
March 30, 2020	Stay-at-home order issued for several South Florida counties.
April 1, 2020	Stay-at-home order issued for entire state.
June 1, 2020	Statewide moratorium on evictions and foreclosures extended by 30 days.
June 5, 2020	"Phase 2" of reopening begins, except for the counties of Miami-Dade, Broward, and Palm Beach.
June 26, 2020	Banned alcohol sales at all bars across the state.
September 25, 2020	"Phase 3" of reopening begins.

=== State government ===
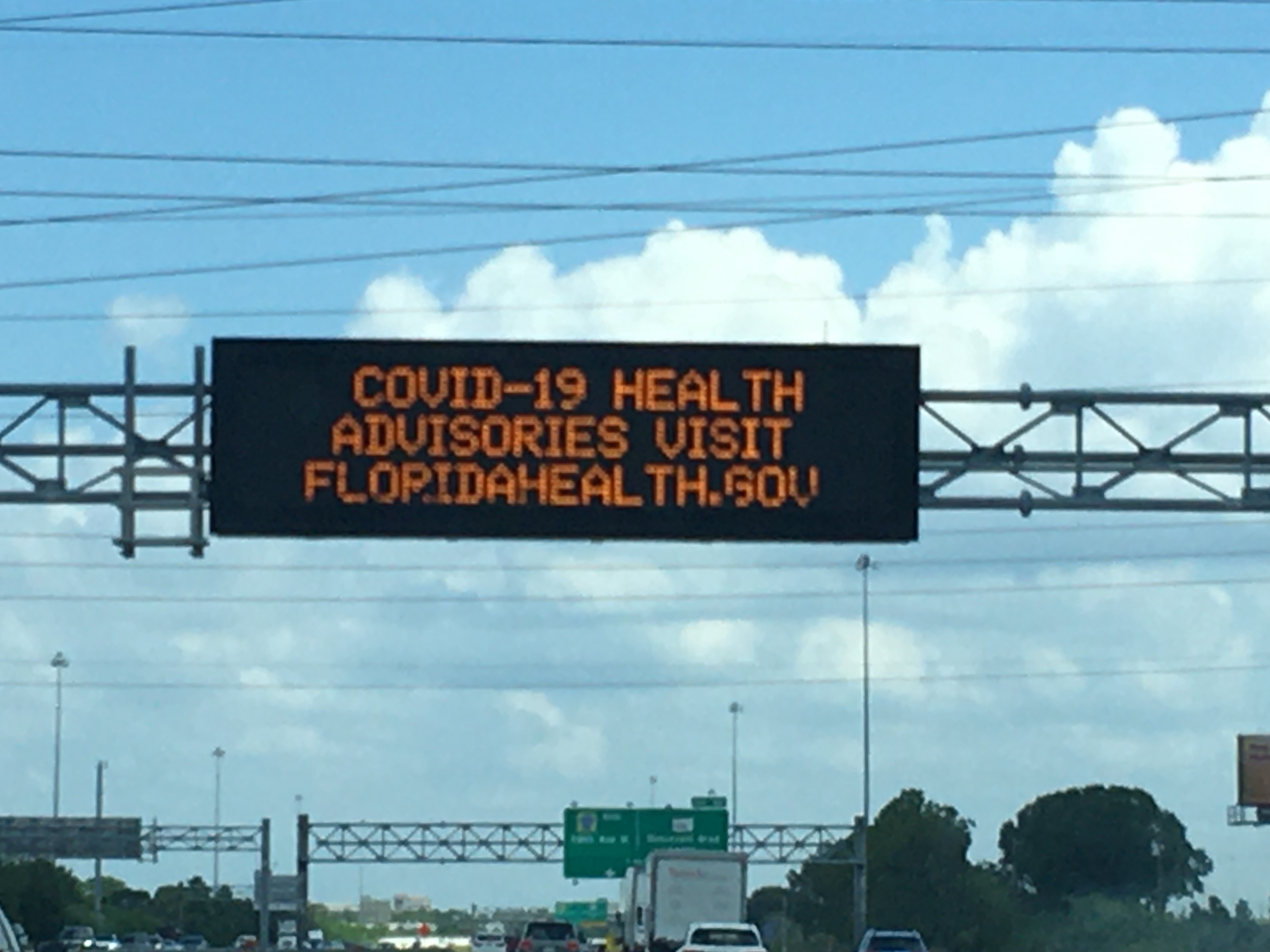
Variable-message sign displaying COVID-19 info on an expressway on July 17, 2020

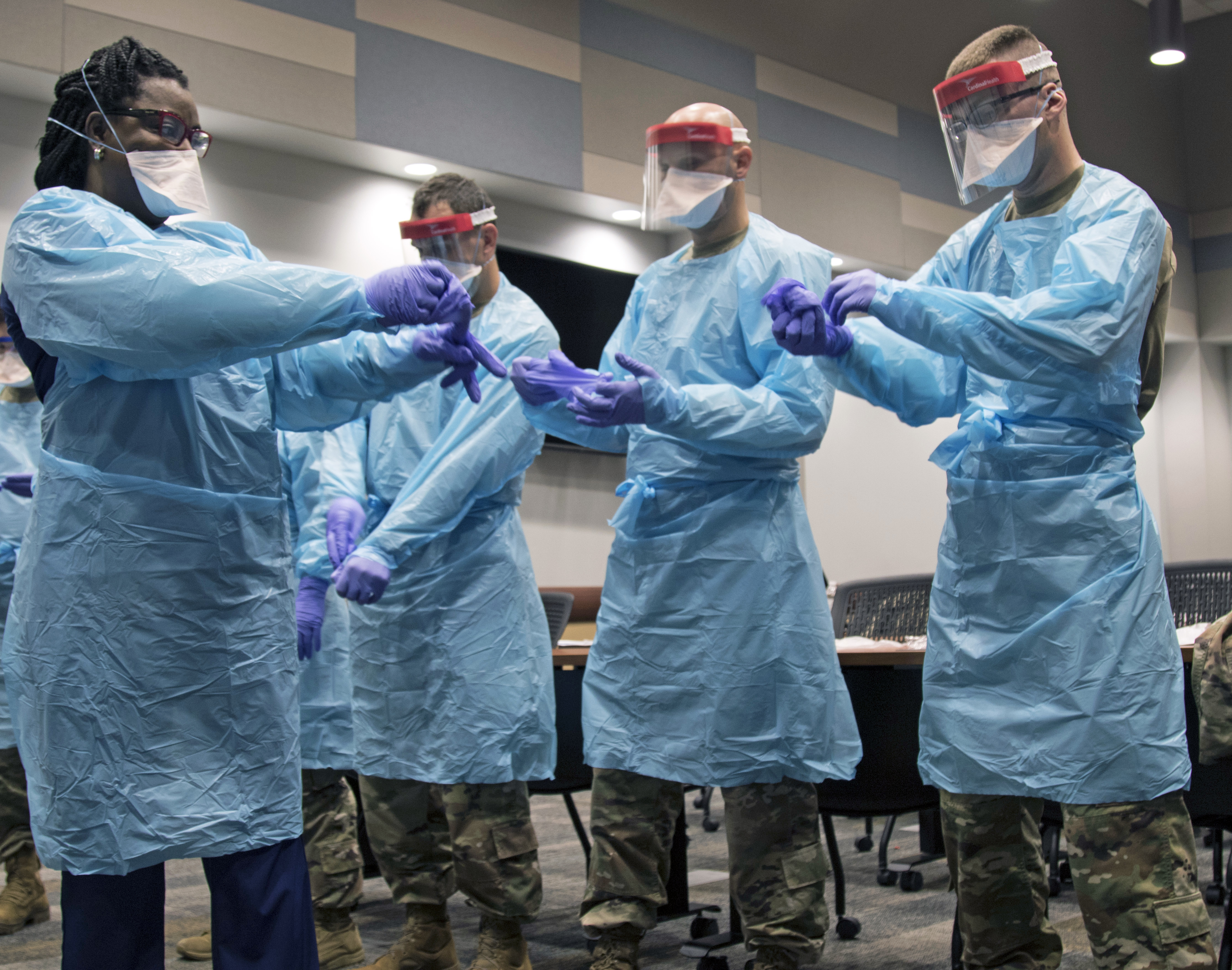
Florida National Guard soldiers collaborate with hospital staff to don personal protective equipment

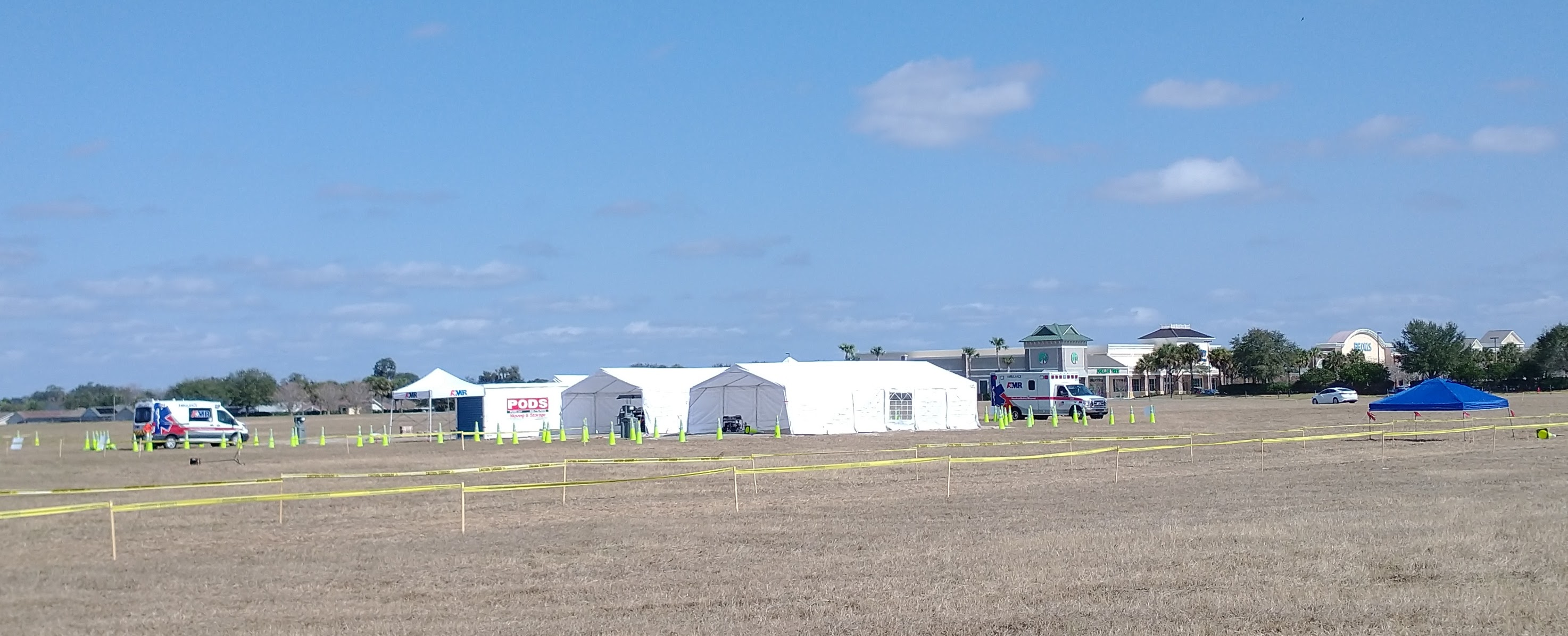
A drive-in COVID-19 vaccine site The Villages, Florida.

On March 1, Governor DeSantis declared a public health emergency after two cases were confirmed in Manatee County and Hillsborough County. On March 17, he ordered all bars and nightclubs to be closed for 30 days, extended school closures to April 15, and cancelled state-mandated school testing.

By the third week of the pandemic's presence in Florida, DeSantis began attracting criticism for the state's slow response to the pandemic, particularly for deferring beach closings to local governments during spring break while vacationers continued to congregate. The Miami Herald's editorial board wrote an editorial condemning DeSantis' inaction in requesting help from the federal government, while noting his vocal support of U.S. president Donald Trump. Speculation mounted that DeSantis' decision not to lock down the state was influenced by business interests, instead of health experts. Business lobbyists, including the Florida Chamber of Commerce, urged the Governor not to "take drastic measures that might shut down the state's economy." On March 27, more than 900 health care workers signed a letter asking DeSantis to order citizens to shelter-in-place, and take other measures to slow the spread of COVID-19. A similar letter written by Doctors for America was signed by 500 health care professionals a few days earlier.

On March 27, DeSantis expanded a previous order requiring airline travelers from New York City to self-quarantine for fourteen days to include people who enter from Louisiana via Interstate 10.

On March 28, an emergency alert was sent to cell phones throughout Florida from the state's Surgeon General, Dr. Scott A. Rivkees, regarding public safety among those 65 and older and those with medical conditions, as well as the full population.

On March 30, DeSantis issued a stay-at-home order for the South Florida counties of Broward, Miami-Dade, Palm Beach, and Monroe, where over 58% of the state's COVID-19 cases were concentrated. He stated that the order would remain in effect at least until the middle of May.

On April 1, DeSantis issued a stay-at-home order for the entire state, effective for 30 days, after a call with President Trump. This followed criticism from experts that stricter measures were necessary to contain the virus.

On April 9, while discussing the possibility of sending children back to school, DeSantis said, "I don't think nationwide there's been a single fatality under 25." (This was not true; by this point, several Americans under 25 had died of COVID-19.) DeSantis suggested that the flu was more dangerous to this age group.

On June 1, DeSantis extended the statewide moratorium on evictions and foreclosures another 30 days, lasting through July 1. Residents of Florida who receive unemployment payments were confused in mid-June when the state of Florida switched their payments from weekly to bi-weekly, with no apparent notice.

On June 5, DeSantis issued an executive order implementing "Phase 2" of a reopening plan outside of Miami-Dade, Broward and Palm Beach counties, allowing some businesses (such as bars, pubs, and indoor venues such as arcades, bowling alleys, cinemas, and concert venues) to expand to 50% capacity, and personal care services to resume operations. The order recommended against gatherings of more than 50 people.

On June 16, DeSantis said 260 Orlando International Airport workers tested positive for COVID-19. He also said that the increase of cases was due to an increase of testing and that even though cases are increasing, "they are not rolling back." Orlando airport said this was false, and that only 2 out of 500 employees tested positive.

New York Governor Andrew Cuomo considered the idea of quarantining people who travel from Florida to New York due to concern of rising COVID-19 cases in Florida. On June 20, DeSantis said that he was cracking down on restaurants not practicing strict social distancing guideline. He also noted that the new cases were trending in the younger generation, with much of the cases being people between the ages of 20 and 35 years old.

On June 23, DeSantis said that Florida bars and restaurants would be liable to lose their liquor licenses if they violate the state's social distancing guidelines. 13 employees and at least 28 patrons of The Knight's Pub in Orlando tested positive for COVID-19, resulting in The Knight's Pub losing their liquor license. Due to the increase of cases, some hospitals, like Palm Beach Gardens and JFK Medical Center, reported having no open ICU beds. However, State Surgeon General Dr. Scott Rivkees told hospitals to only report COVID-19 patients as ICU cases if they required ICU level of care, since some ICUs were being used to simply isolate COVID-19 patients from other hospital patients, and to report non-ICU-level care cases as COVID-hospitalized cases. The same day, Florida banned liquor sales at bars that do not offer substantial food menus. Strip clubs remained open.

As of June 26, 660 inmates and 24 staff at the Homestead Correctional Institution tested positive for COVID-19, and 23 deaths had been accounted for at the Institution due to the virus.

On September 10, 2020, the state rescinded the executive order prohibiting alcohol sales at bars.

==== Prohibitions on mitigations ====
On September 25, Governor DeSantis announced Phase 3, which lifted all capacity restrictions on most businesses. In addition, municipalities are prohibited from collecting fines for violations of local health orders, and may not restrict restaurants to less than 50% capacity unless they receive approval from the state; they must provide justification for the decision, and detail any possible economic impact.

From April 2021, DeSantis has signed multiple executive orders designed to prohibit the use of COVID-19 mitigations, citing alleged infringements of personal freedoms. On April 2, 2021, Governor DeSantis signed an executive order prohibiting any business from requiring proof of vaccination or recovery ("vaccine passports") as a prerequisite for entry or the provision of services, punishable by fine of $5,000 per-instance.

On May 3, 2021, DeSantis signed an executive order officially rescinding the state of emergency and all COVID-19-related public health orders. This order superseded all local public health orders, and also prohibited municipalities from enacting any further public health order related to COVID-19. That same day, he signed a bill prohibiting vaccine passports and limiting other COVID-19 mitigation measures such as mask mandates. On July 30, DeSantis signed an executive order prohibiting municipalities and school boards from mandating that masks be worn in schools.

In July 2021, Norwegian Cruise Line sued the Surgeon General of Florida, arguing that the prohibition of vaccine mandates "poses imminent, substantial, irreparable harms" to the company, and prevented it from being able to ensure the health and safety of its passengers and crew. The DeSantis administration argued that the company "has made the disappointing and unlawful choice to join the CDC in discriminating against children and other individuals who cannot be vaccinated or who have opted not to be vaccinated for reasons of health, religion, or conscience." On August 8, District Judge Kathleen M. Williams issued a preliminary injunction against the prohibition, arguing that it "fails to provide a valid evidentiary, factual, or legal predicate", and that "documentary proof of vaccination will expedite passengers' entry into virtually every single country and port where Plaintiffs intend to sail."

On November 18, 2021, DeSantis signed four bills, passed by the Florida Legislature the previous day, that, among other actions, limited vaccine mandates by businesses and government entities.

In January 2023, DeSantis called on the Florida Legislature to permanently extend existing prohibitions on COVID-19 vaccine and mask mandates, which were set to expire. On May 11, 2023, he signed four bills into law making those COVID-19 policies permanent, including bans on vaccine and mask mandates in schools, workplaces, and government entities; prohibitions on vaccine passports; new physician conscience protections; a ban on gain-of-function research; and a requirement that World Health Organization policies receive state approval before taking effect in Florida.

=== County and local responses ===
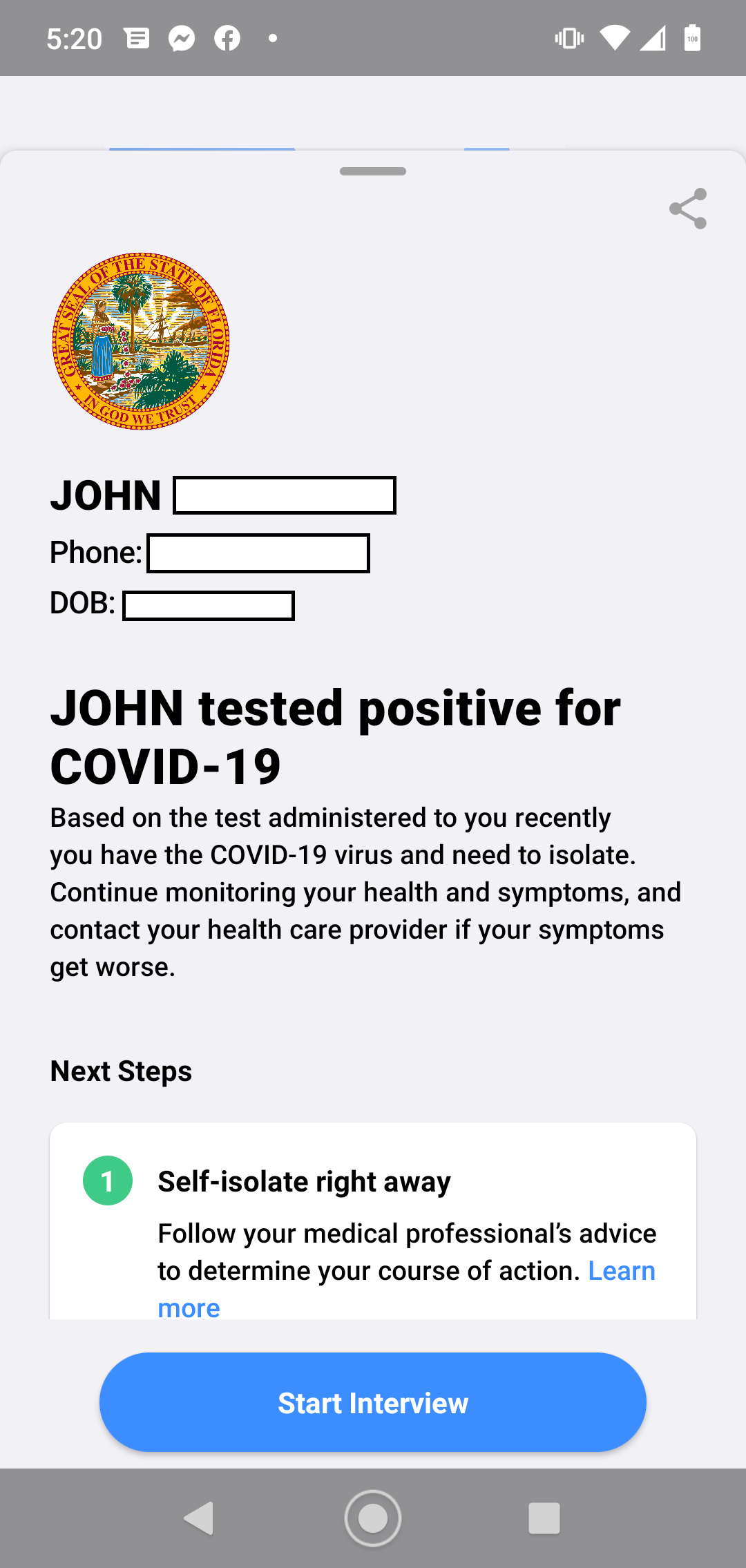
Notification of positive COVID-19 test using the Healthy Together App in the state of Florida.

==== Schools ====
On June 10, 2020, it was announced that Broward County and Palm Beach County were considering twice-a-week school for the fall. On June 16, 2020, Broward County announced that schools would reopen on August 16, 2020, with hybrid learning, both in-person and online education.

On July 6, 2020, the Florida Department of Education ordered all public schools to reopen in person. This was challenged by the Florida Education Association (FEA). On August 24, 2020, the Second Judicial Circuit Court issued an injunction against the order. The case was appealed to the First District Court of Appeal, which ruled in mid October 2020 in favor of the reopening order. A rehearing was requested in late October 2020, but ultimately the FEA voluntarily dismissed the case on December 23, 2020.

From August 10 to December 21, 2020, cases of school-related COVID-19 included 25,094 among students and 9,630 among staff members. Of all 2,809,553 registered students, there were 101 hospitalizations and no deaths. Among staff members, there were 219 hospitalizations and 13 deaths. Contact tracing revealed 10,092 positive cases in people who had close-contact in a school setting with people who had school-related COVID-19. 62 of the 67 school districts had at least one case, with a total of 695 school-based outbreaks. 28 schools in 12 districts closed temporarily because of COVID-19.

==== Masks ====
On June 23, Carlos Gimenez, Mayor of Miami-Dade County, said police would be enforcing rules concerning wearing masks in public places and social distancing. On June 25, Palm Beach County started enforcing a mask mandate. On June 26, Key West implemented a mandatory mask law, making it punishable either by citation or a $500 fine, and they canceled 4 July fireworks. At the end of June, the commissioners for St. Johns County voted 4–1 against requiring masks indoors. Less than two weeks later, one of the St. Johns commissioners who had voted against masks was hospitalized in critical condition with a COVID-19 diagnosis.

In August 2020, Marion County's sheriff's office announced that deputies and visitors to the police stations would be forbidden from wearing masks.

Beginning September 25, 2020, as part of an executive order from DeSantis which coincided with "Phase 3" of reopening the state, local governments are not able to collect fines from individuals who violate local COVID-19-related health orders.

===== Prohibition of mask mandates in schools =====
On July 30, 2021, Governor DeSantis signed an executive order that prohibits schools and school boards from mandating masks, citing a desire to preserve personal freedoms and parents' rights to choose. Schools that mandate masks, thereby violating this order, may lose their state funding. Additionally, the governor's office threatened to "withhold" the paychecks of individual superintendents and school board members who "intentionally defy" the order.

The order faced wide criticism, due to the fact that there were no vaccines approved by the FDA for children younger than 12 at the time, and that the CDC had recommended the wearing of masks by all school students and faculty due to Delta variant. A number of school districts announced that they would defy the order and mandate masks; Alberto M. Carvalho, superintendent of Miami-Dade County Public Schools, stated that "At no point shall I allow my decision to be influenced by a threat to my paycheck; a small price to pay considering the gravity of this issue and the potential impact to the health and well-being of our students and dedicated employees." Two lawsuits against the order were filed on August 6, alleging that it violates provisions in the state constitution which prescribe that "adequate provision shall be made by law for a uniform, efficient, safe, secure, and high quality system of free public schools". The Biden administration expressed support for the local schools.

On August 12, DeSantis's press secretary Christina Pushaw told the Miami Herald that the Governor could not actually withhold pay from officials who willfully violate the executive order since they are not state employees, and because they might "take funding from other needs in their own district" in order to cover their salaries. She argued that "those officials should own their decision — and that means owning the consequences of their decisions rather than demanding students, teachers, and school staff to foot the bill for their potential grandstanding." During a ten-day period in late August and early September, 15 staff members in the Miami-Dade County public schools died of COVID-19.

On August 27, the state's Second Judicial Circuit ruled that the Florida Department of Education could not interfere with local mask mandates. However, on September 10, the First District Court of Appeal reversed the decision, reinstating Governor DeSantis's policy that masks should always be optional. The same day, the U.S. Department of Education's Office of Civil Rights, suspecting that a statewide ban on local mask mandates may violate the rights of students with disabilities, announced its intent to probe DeSantis's policy. On October 7, the Republican-led state Board of Education voted to penalize eight school districts for requiring masks.

==== Curfews ====
Miami-Dade County Mayor Carlos Gimenez signed order to close beaches starting Friday, July 3, 2020, and ending Tuesday, July 7, with a limit of gatherings to 50 people. Broward County and Palm Beach County soon after followed Miami-Dade's example and decided to close their beaches for 4 July as well.

On July 2, 2020, Mayor Gimenez ordered a 10 p.m. to 6 a.m. curfew. He also ordered all on-site dining to close from 12:01 a.m. to 6 a.m. daily at restaurants with seating for more than eight people. Both orders were to last until further notice.

On March 20, 2021, the City of Miami Beach declared a state of emergency and an 8 p.m. curfew due to overcrowded streets during spring break.

=== Contact tracing ===
On July 7, 2020, DeSantis announced that Florida had received federal grants under the CARES Act to hire contact tracers. According to the state's daily report for July 6 out of 213,794 confirmed cases, over 40% had still not been contacted. Contact tracing has met with challenges as contact tracers have been unable to track the spread at crowded parties because young people have not wanted to share the information with contact tracers.

== Statistics ==
During the months of June, July, and August 2020, the number of COVID-19 cases in Florida increased over eleven-fold, from 56,830 on June 1 to 631,040 on September 1. COVID-19 deaths lag by several weeks behind case counts, but by the end of July, Florida set new death records on four consecutive days, culminating in 257 deaths on July 31. Since June 1, the seven-day rolling average of new COVID-19 cases in Florida has increased 388%, from 726 new cases per day on June 1, to 2,757 new cases per day as of September 23. During the months of June, July, and August 2020, the seven-day rolling average of COVID-19 deaths increased nearly four-fold, from an average of 29.7 newly reported deaths per day on June 1 to 113 deaths per day on September 1.

=== By County ===
COVID-19 pandemic medical cases in Florida by county
County (Note: County where individuals with a positive case reside, not necessarily where they were diagnosed or infected.)	Cases	Hosp.	Deaths	Population (Note: Population figures reported on Florida's COVID-19 Dashboard.)	Cases / 100k	Deaths / 100k	CFR	Notes
Residents	8,378,545	80,954	99,814	20,598,139	9,268.8	153.8	1.7%	
Non-residents	35,786	n/a	583	n/a	n/a	n/a	1.6%	
Total	8,378,545	n/a	99,814	n/a	n/a	n/a	1.7%	
Alachua	99,891	1,066	979	263,148	8,492.9	89.7	1.1%	
Baker	11,437	173	167	27,785	11,862.5	201.5	1.7%	
Bay	60,426	776	965	182,482	10,037.7	193.4	1.9%	
Bradford	10,086	145	205	26,979	10,574.9	192.7	1.8%	
Brevard	202,337	2,050	3,050	576,808	5,921.7	132.5	2.2%	
Broward	842,346	9,065	7,526	1,909,151	10,336.9	129.1	1.2%	
Calhoun	5,642	56	119	14,750	10,983.1	311.9	2.8%	
Charlotte	55,379	822	1,258	160,511	6,646.3	232.4	3.5%	
Citrus	44,477	645	1,355	140,031	6,999.9	295.6	4.2%	
Clay	75,794	857	1,112	192,370	8,745.1	163.7	1.9%	
Collier	118,811	1,542	1,378	328,134	9,040.8	141.7	1.6%	
Columbia	28,504	448	528	67,485	11,393.6	238.6	2.1%	
DeSoto	12,540	278	205	36,399	10,588.2	208.8	2.0%	
Dixie	5,460	101	101	16,437	9,186.6	133.8	1.5%	
Duval	355,708	1,959	4,361	924,229	9,549.4	130.7	1.4%	
Escambia	105,762	2,049	1,684	311,522	9,824.7	204.5	2.1%	
Flagler	32,620	337	566	107,139	5,654.3	86.8	1.5%	
Franklin	3,848	28	64	11,736	10,616.9	144.9	1.4%	
Gadsden	19,888	413	278	46,017	11,880.4	189.1	1.6%	
Gilchrist	6,212	66	124	17,615	8,101.1	210.0	2.6%	
Glades	2,472	68	40	13,363	6,772.4	119.7	1.8%	
Gulf	5,560	95	96	16,055	11,572.7	255.4	2.2%	
Hamilton	4,835	77	75	14,269	10,883.7	154.2	1.4%	
Hardee	11,869	207	163	27,228	10,301.9	113.9	1.1%	
Hendry	15,169	322	190	40,127	10,785.8	186.9	1.7%	
Hernando	59,541	956	1,466	182,696	6,307.2	220.6	3.5%	
Highlands	34,760	576	911	102,101	7,117.5	301.7	4.2%	
Hillsborough	534,337	2,842	5,142	1,378,883	8,170.5	111.3	1.4%	
Holmes	6,886	82	121	19,430	11,137.4	236.7	2.1%	
Indian River	48,891	768	933	150,984	7,351.8	176.8	2.4%	
Jackson	20,410	341	358	48,472	12,165.8	315.6	2.6%	
Jefferson	5,524	70	81	14,105	9,833.4	170.2	1.7%	
Lafayette	3,367	49	69	8,744	18,241.1	274.5	1.5%	
Lake	124,711	1,295	2,149	335,362	7,388.1	173.8	2.4%	
Lee	275,935	2,066	3,040	718,679	7,903.4	123.7	1.6%	
Leon	124,402	615	946	288,102	9,948.6	101.4	1.0%	
Levy	14,418	185	220	39,961	7,317.1	102.6	1.4%	
Liberty	3,389	22	36	8,365	12,516.4	191.3	1.5%	
Madison	7,466	88	120	18,474	10,761.1	232.8	2.2%	
Manatee	135,991	1,382	2,081	373,853	8,534.9	163.7	1.9%	
Marion	117,125	1,781	2,766	348,371	8,022.5	245.4	3.1%	
Martin	47,433	704	961	157,581	6,731.8	186.6	2.8%	
Miami-Dade	1,666,362	11,818	13,474	2,715,516	15,257.4	204.7	1.3%	
Monroe	24,733	239	174	76,325	7,414.3	60.3	0.8%	
Nassau	31,027	293	413	80,578	9,150.1	144.0	1.6%	
Okaloosa	68,573	674	851	200,737	9,484.1	165.9	1.7%	
Okeechobee	14,197	364	237	40,572	8,772.1	204.6	2.3%	
Orange	528,496	2,430	3,847	1,321,194	8,686.4	85.2	1.0%	
Osceola	159,778	1,299	1,428	338,619	10,891.6	135.6	1.2%	
Palm Beach	537,115	6,098	7,005	1,446,277	8,380.7	173.5	2.1%	
Pasco	181,724	2,235	2,712	510,593	6,610.2	130.0	2.0%	
Pinellas	315,381	4,313	4,890	957,875	6,910.0	154.5	2.2%	
Polk	297,145	4,446	3,994	668,671	8,630.7	175.7	2.0%	
Putnam	22,768	505	510	72,766	8,077.9	178.7	2.2%	
Santa Rosa	66,695	812	810	170,442	10,029.8	156.7	1.6%	
Sarasota	135,465	1,259	2,520	412,144	6,352.6	182.0	2.9%	
Seminole	148,349	1,145	1,503	455,086	6,060.8	97.1	1.6%	
St. Johns	88,059	712	845	235,503	8,515.8	84.9	1.0%	
St. Lucie	109,558	1,506	1,643	305,591	7,361.1	180.3	2.4%	
Sumter	34,985	513	867	122,999	6,586.2	197.6	3.0%	
Suwannee	17,551	303	387	43,924	11,654.2	302.8	2.6%	
Taylor	8,585	92	129	22,098	12,001.1	190.1	1.6%	
Union	5,539	77	129	15,239	11,464.0	459.3	4.0%	
Volusia	169,966	1,793	2,865	527,634	6,554.4	128.3	2.0%	
Wakulla	13,905	151	159	31,877	9,972.7	163.1	1.6%	
Walton	21,993	278	276	65,858	9,692.1	123.0	1.3%	
Washington	8,279	131	148	24,566	10,657.0	195.4	1.8%	
Unknown	658	1	9	n/a	n/a	n/a	n/a	
These figures were reported by the Florida Department of Health on May 9, 2025, except where noted otherwise.

=== Demographics ===
COVID-19 deaths among Floridians by age as of January 22, 2022:

View source data.

COVID-19 deaths among Floridians by age, as of January 22, 2022
Age group	Death count	% of deaths
All ages	61,332	
0–4y	23	<1%
5–14y	19	<1%
15–24y	189	0.3%
25–34y	768	1.3%
35–44y	1,973	3.2%
45–54y	4,449	7.3%
55–64y	9,287	15.1%
65–74y	13,877	22.6%
75–84y	16,092	26.2%
85y and over	14,655	23.9%

=== All-cause deaths ===
Weekly all-cause deaths in Florida:

View source data.

== Impacts ==
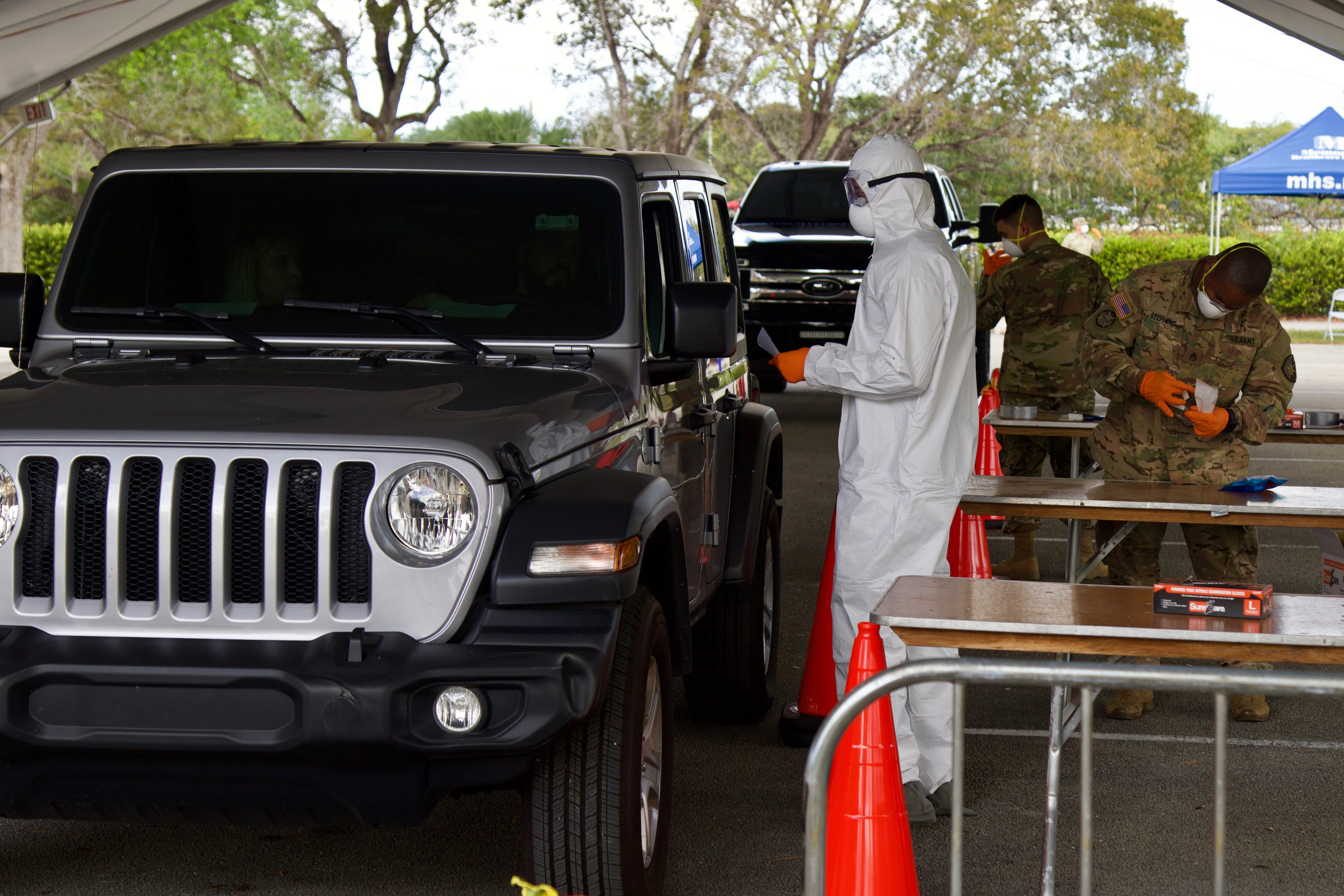
Testing site in Broward County

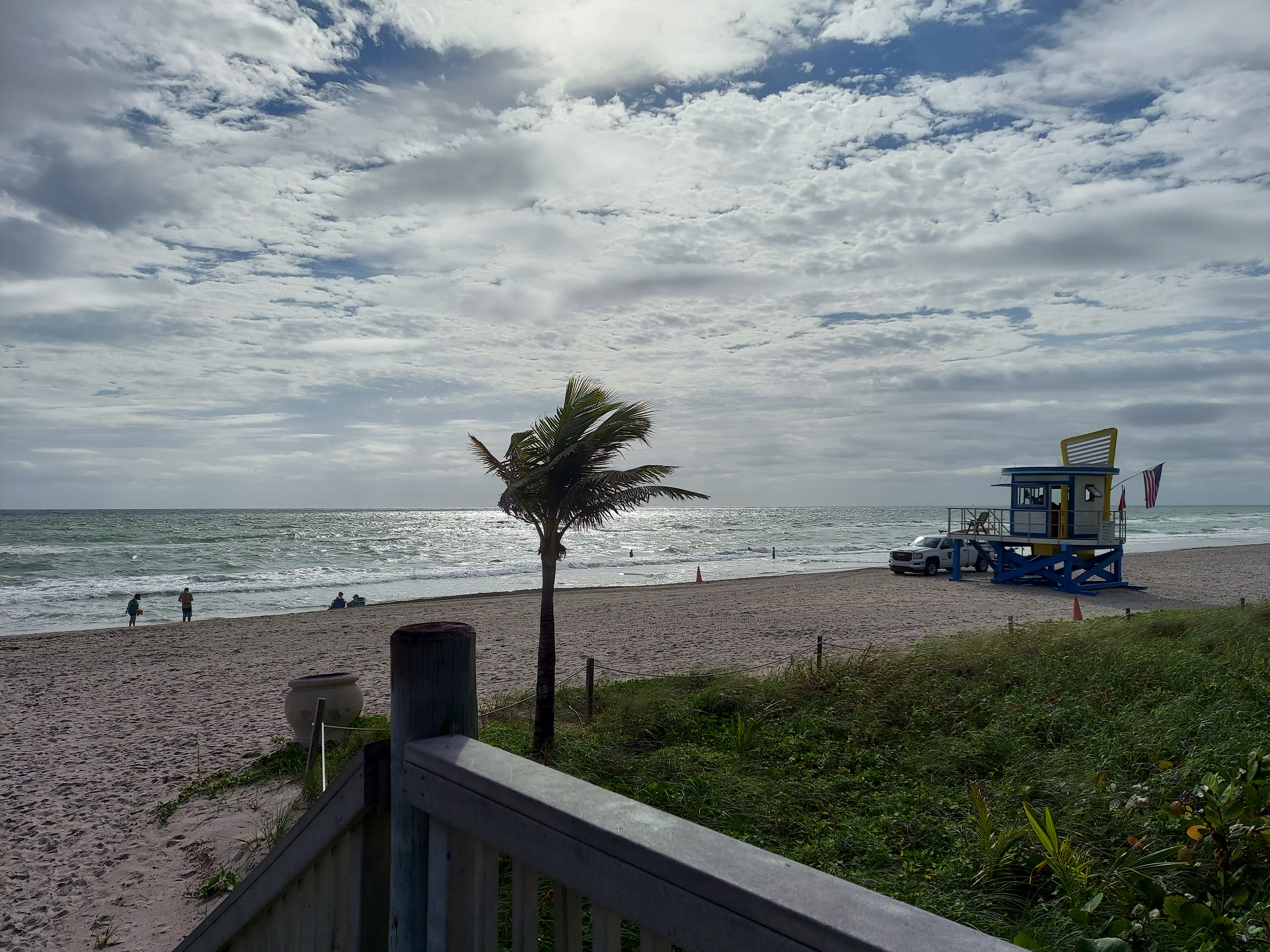
A photo of Hollywood Beach taken in late October 2020, during the COVID-19 pandemic

Early in March 2020, the pandemic began having an impact throughout Florida as state and local government, businesses, and public institutions took measures to slow the spread of the virus.

=== Commercial entities ===
On March 12, Walt Disney Parks & Resorts announced that the Walt Disney World Resort would close from March 15 to end of May, later announcing that the parks and resorts would stay closed indefinitely. Universal Parks & Resorts also announced that Universal Orlando Resort would close from March 15 until at least the end of the month, also later announcing that the parks and resorts would stay closed until May 31. Other theme parks in Florida such as SeaWorld Orlando, Legoland Florida, and Busch Gardens Tampa Bay also decided to close from March 13 until further notice.

Despite the increase of COVID-19 cases in Florida, theme parks reopened in mid-July. Although a major exception to this would be Legoland Florida which reopened on June 1. On July 11, Disney reopened Animal Kingdom and Magic Kingdom. Epcot and Disney's Hollywood Studios reopened on July 15.

=== Elder care facilities ===
On March 2, AARP warned Florida nursing homes to prepare and provide adequate supplies of protective wear and the Florida Department of Health issued guidelines to stop the spread of COVID-19. On March 11, DeSantis placed limits on who could visit nursing homes. On March 23, the Miami Herald, seeking the name of every elder care facility that had a positive test for COVID-19, filed a public records request with the Florida Department of Health and the Agency for Health Care Administration. The governor's office refused to release the information. On April 9, the Miami Herald provided the required notification to the State of Florida that they would be filing a lawsuit to obtain the information. After receiving a call from the governor's office, however, the Miami Herald's law firm, Holland & Knight, dropped the case. The Miami Herald planned to proceed with a different law firm. The government subsequently released a list that, by April 21, included 313 facilities where either caregivers or residents had tested positive. The list was incomplete and did not provide data on the number of individuals infected or deceased.

=== Public universities ===
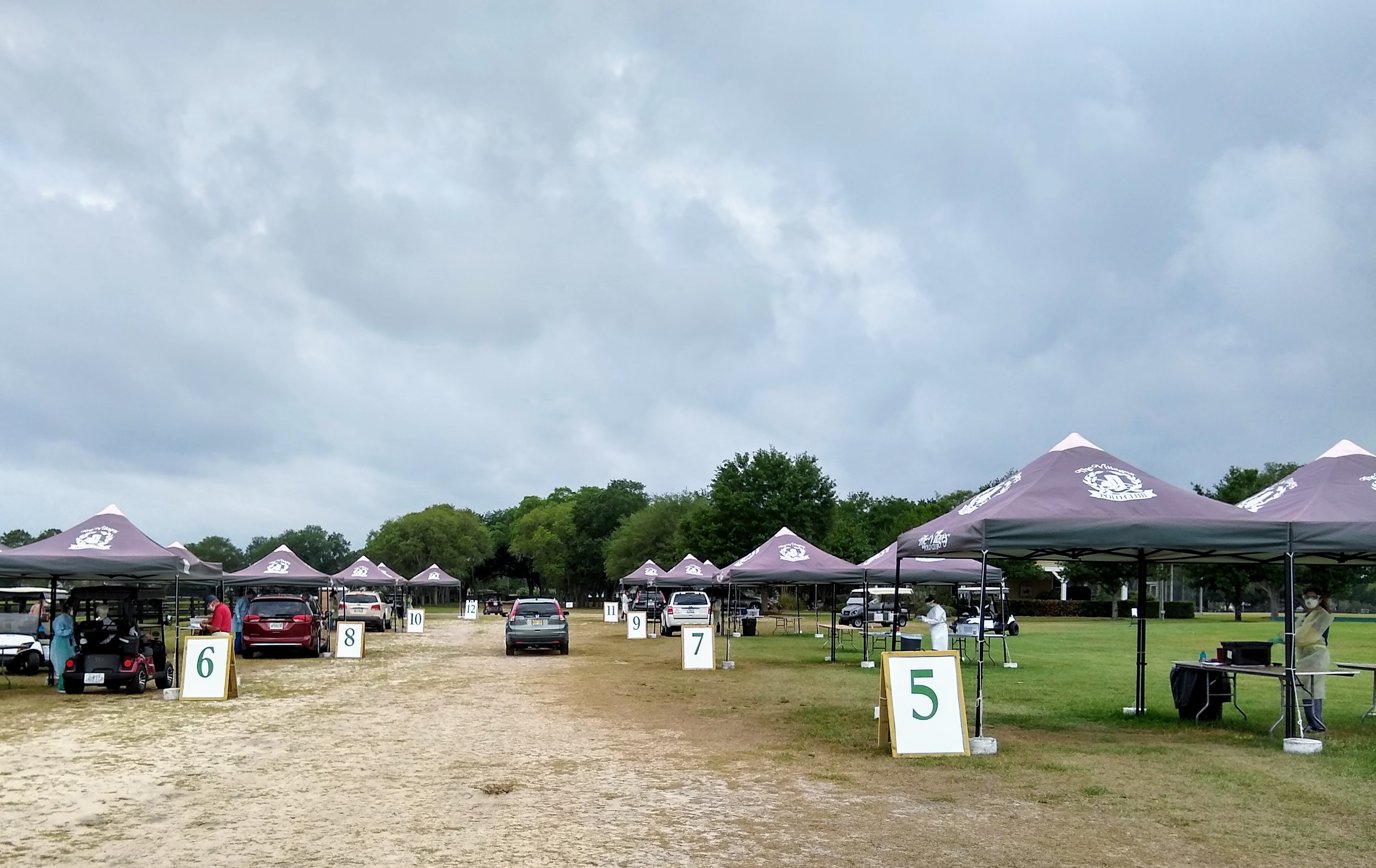
University of Florida research effort on understanding COVID-19 in The Villages

On March 10, Joseph Glover, the provost of the University of Florida (UF), sent out a recommendation to UF professors to transition their classes online. The following day, UF announced all its classes for the spring semester would be transitioned online by the following Monday, and encouraged students to return to their hometowns.

On March 11, Florida State University announced that classes would be moved online from March 23 to April 5, with in-person classes expected to resume on April 6. The Board of Governors of the State University System of Florida directed all state universities to make plans to transition into remote learning effective immediately. Essential functions, such as dining and library services were still operational. Florida International University in Miami announced that it would transition to remote learning starting from March 12 until at least April 4. The University of South Florida in Tampa announced that all classes will consist of remote instruction for the rest of Spring 2020 semester. On March 17, University of Central Florida announced that it would be canceling graduation; two days later, one of their students tested positive for COVID-19. On June 10, Florida International University received a $1 million grant from the National Institute of Health for vaccines.

=== Parks ===
The Florida Department of Environmental Protection announced on March 22 that they would be closing all state parks to the public. Miami Beach reopened a number of public parks on April 29. Over the following weekend, authorities issued over 7,000 verbal warnings to people who were not wearing face masks. Most were at South Pointe Park. On the morning of May 4, the city announced that South Pointe Park was closed again until further notice. Pinellas and Manatee County Public beaches would reopen on May 4 with both counties requiring social distancing. County parks in Hillsborough County would reopen on May 18. Several beaches were closed for the 2020 Fourth of July weekend.

=== Sports ===
Most of the state's sports teams were affected by the pandemic. Several leagues postponed or suspended their seasons starting March 12. Major League Baseball (MLB) canceled the remainder of spring training, affecting the Miami Marlins and Tampa Bay Rays and the other Florida spring training teams. and announced that the season would be postponed indefinitely. The National Basketball Association (NBA) announced the season would be suspended for 30 days, affecting the Miami Heat and Orlando Magic. The National Hockey League (NHL) season was suspended indefinitely, affecting the Florida Panthers and Tampa Bay Lightning. The Miami Open, a major tennis tournament on the ATP Tour and WTA Tour was canceled for the first time in its history on March 12. In motorsports NASCAR was scheduled to race at Homestead-Miami Speedway on March 20–22, however on March 12 NASCAR announced that the races would be held behind doors, but one day later NASCAR cancelled the races and rescheduled them for June 13–14. INDYCAR was scheduled to race on the streets in St. Petersburgh on March 15 for its season opener, but INDYCAR announced that the race would be held behind doors before one day later cancelling the race and rescheduling it for the season finale on October 25.

==== Professional wrestling; state exceptions on sports ====
In the wake of sports cancellations, the professional wrestling promotions All Elite Wrestling (AEW) and WWE re-located their weekly television programs (which normally toured to different arenas each episode) to sites in Florida in mid-March. AEW filmed its AEW Dynamite and all pay-per-views at Daily's Place in Jacksonville (which shares ownership with AEW via its lead investor Shahid Khan) until April 1, and WWE filmed all of its programming at its WWE Performance Center training facility in Orlando (including its flagship event WrestleMania 36, which was originally to be held at Tampa's Raymond James Stadium). Both promotions were filmed behind closed doors with no audience and only essential staff present. AEW re-located to a closed set in Norcross, Georgia on April 1, where it filmed content through April 3.

On April 9, the Division of Emergency Management amended its state-wide stay-at-home order, categorizing employees of "professional sports and media production with a national audience," if closed to the general public, essential workers. The following Monday, April 13, Mayor of Orange County Jerry Demings confirmed that this change would allow WWE to continue its closed door tapings in the state, and were implemented following discussions with the office of Governor DeSantis. It was subsequently reported that WWE was warned of the stay-at-home restrictions by officials, but that DeSantis deemed the company's operations critical to Florida's economy, and approved the new exemption in response.

The next day, DeSantis defended his decision, explaining that, "if you think about it, we have never had a period like this in modern American history where you've had so little new content, particularly in the sporting realm," and suggested that other closed-door sporting events — such as golf (particularly, a proposed rematch between Tiger Woods and Phil Mickelson) and NASCAR races — could also be held under the new exception. Secretary of the Department of Business and Professional Regulation Halsey Beshears had also made a post on Twitter directed to the mixed martial arts promotion UFC on April 7, suggesting that his department could help sanction their events there (however, after it intended to hold UFC 249 and other fights at a tribal casino in California, the promotion suspended all events indefinitely on April 9, by request of its U.S. rightsholders ESPN Inc. and The Walt Disney Company).

Orlando Sentinel columnists Mike Bianchi and Scott Maxwell questioned whether these actions were intended to help the state gain favor from the Trump administration; WWE owner and chairman Vince McMahon has been an ally of Trump, who had made recurring appearances in WWE programming as a celebrity figure prior to his presidency, and was inducted to the celebrity wing of the WWE Hall of Fame in 2013. The same day as Deming's announcement, America First Action — a super PAC led by McMahon's wife and former Administrator of the Small Business Administration, Linda McMahon — pledged $18.5 million on advertising in Florida for Trump's 2020 re-election campaign. On April 14, McMahon was named to a federal advisory group on the "re-opening" of the country's economy, joining other notable sports figures. During the daily press briefing, Trump addressed him and UFC head Dana White (who is also a Trump ally) with the title, "The Great".

Following the implementation of this exception, several sporting events were announced for the state; on April 24, UFC announced that a new UFC 249 and two UFC Fight Night cards would be held in Jacksonville in May. Two televised golf events benefiting COVID-19-related causes were scheduled for local courses, including TaylorMade Driving Relief at Seminole Golf Club—a skins game by NBC Sports and Golf Channel featuring Rory McIlroy, Dustin Johnson, Rickie Fowler and Matthew Wolff —on May 17, and The Match: Champions for Charity on May 24 at Medalist Golf Club in Hobe Sound—a four-ball competition by Turner Sports featuring Tiger Woods and Phil Mickelson paired with Peyton Manning and Tom Brady. On May 14, NASCAR announced a new June 14 date for its postponed Dixie Vodka 400 at Homestead–Miami Speedway. On May 23, All Elite Wrestling returned to Jacksonville for its pay-per-view Double or Nothing (relocated from Las Vegas), with most of the event being held at Daily's Place, and a main event "Stadium Stampede" match within the confines of neighboring TIAA Bank Field.

==== Return to play in professional sports ====
On May 23, the NBA confirmed that it was in talks with Walt Disney World in Orlando to use it as one or more centralized sites for the resumption of the NBA season. On June 4, the league approved a plan to host the remainder of the season at Walt Disney World's ESPN Wide World of Sports Complex. Major League Soccer similarly announced on June 10 that it would host the one-off MLS is Back Tournament at the same site, with all 26 MLS clubs competing to qualify for the 2021 CONCACAF Champions League.

As part of the NHL's return-to-play, training facilities reopened on June 10. On June 19, a number of COVID-19 cases were reported among team training facilities in Florida, including the Philadelphia Phillies (MLB) and Tampa Bay Lightning (NHL). In Major League Baseball, the Toronto Blue Jays temporarily closed its spring training facility in Dunedin after a player showed signs of symptoms. In combination with similar concerns regarding facilities in Arizona, all MLB spring training facilities were closed league-wide for cleaning. On June 24, WWE announced that multiple cases had been recorded among its staff, including performers and on-air personality Renee Young. WWE stated that it would now test all performers prior to its television broadcasts. Minor League Baseball, headquartered in St. Petersburg, announced on June 30 that the 2020 season would not be played, affecting all teams statewide and nationally.

With the introduction of Phase 3, some of Florida's sports teams began to reintroduce in-person spectators in late-2020, though still voluntarily limiting capacity to follow federal guidance. Super Bowl LV was held at Raymond James Stadium on February 7, 2021, with the stadium hosting just under 25,000 spectators. Two months later, Raymond James Stadium hosted WrestleMania 37, WWE's first in-person event since the onset of the pandemic. WWE had originally planned to host WrestleMania 37 at SoFi Stadium in Inglewood, California, but delayed their hosting to 2023 due to current health orders in the state, and to compensate for Tampa not being able to host the event in 2020.

Due to Canadian border restrictions, multiple professional sports teams based in the country temporarily re-located their home games to sites in Florida for all or part of their 2020 and/or 2021 seasons, including the Toronto Raptors (Tampa Bay), Toronto Blue Jays (who began the season at their Spring Training home of TD Ballpark in Dunedin), and Major League Soccer's CF Montreal and Toronto FC (Fort Lauderdale and Orlando).

== See also ==
- Timeline of the COVID-19 pandemic in the United States
- COVID-19 pandemic in the United States – for impact on the country
- COVID-19 pandemic – for impact on other countries
