= Scott Rivkees =

American physician-scientist

Surgeon General of Florida
- In office June 2019 – September 2021
- Governor: Ron DeSantis
- Preceded by: Celeste Philip
- Succeeded by: Joseph Ladapo

Personal details
- Born: 1956 (age 69–70)
- Education: Rutgers University, New Brunswick (BS); University of Medicine and Dentistry of New Jersey, Newark (MD)

Scott Andrew Rivkees (born 1956) is an American physician-scientist and pediatric endocrinologist, who served as State Surgeon General and Secretary of Health of Florida from June 2019 to September 2021. The majority of Rivkees' tenure coincided with the COVID-19 pandemic.

Rivkees is currently Professor of the Practice of Health Services, Policy and Practice at the Brown University School of Public Health in Providence, Rhode Island.

== Early life and education ==
Raised in New Providence, New Jersey, Rivkees graduated from New Providence High School in 1974. He graduated with a BS degree from Cook College, Rutgers University in 1978. In 1982, he graduated with an MD degree from the University of Medicine and Dentistry of New Jersey where he was elected to Alpha Omega Alpha and received the Mosby Pediatric Award. He received residency training in pediatrics from 1982 to 1985 at Massachusetts General Hospital. From 1985 to 1987, he received fellowship training in pediatric endocrinology neuroscience at Massachusetts General Hospital which was followed by post-doctoral training in neuroscience at Massachusetts General Hospital. He is board-certified in pediatrics and pediatric endocrinology.

== Career ==
Rivkees was an Assistant in Pediatrics at Massachusetts General Hospital and Assistant Professor of Pediatrics, Harvard Medical School, Boston MA from 1989-1993. From 1993 to 1996, he was an Associate Professor of Pediatrics at Indiana University and Riley Children’s Hospital. In 1996, he joined the Department of Pediatrics at Yale University School of Medicine where he became Professor with tenure in 2004. At Yale he was Chief of the Section of Developmental Endocrinology and Biology and Associate Chair of Yale Pediatrics for Research. In 2012, he became Chair of Pediatrics, University of Florida and Physician in Chief, Shands Hospital for Children. He also became Academic Chair of Pediatrics, Arnold Palmer Hospital, Orlando Health, and University of Florida Chair of Pediatrics, Studer Family Children’s Hospital, Pensacola. In 2019, Rivkees was confirmed as State Surgeon General and Secretary of Health for Florida, a position he held until September 2021. In 2022, Rivkees left the University of Florida and joined the Brown University School of Public Health. In September 2023, Rivkees rebuked the DeSantis administration's criticism of COVID-19 vaccines as not proven to be safe or effective. Rivkees stated that the COVID vaccines remain "very, very safe, and have a really proven efficacy, particularly against preventing severe disease."

=== Chair of Pediatrics at University of Florida ===
As department chair, Rivkees introduced training in pediatrics and stimulate academic productivity. Rivkees was elected to the board of the Association of Medical Schools Pediatric Department Chairs (AMSPDC). He was the AMSPDC representative to the Pediatric Policy Council. He was elected as one of the directors of the Florida Chapter of the American Academy of Pediatrics. For his service to pediatrics, he received the American Academy of Pediatrics Special Achievement Award.

=== State Surgeon General of Florida ===
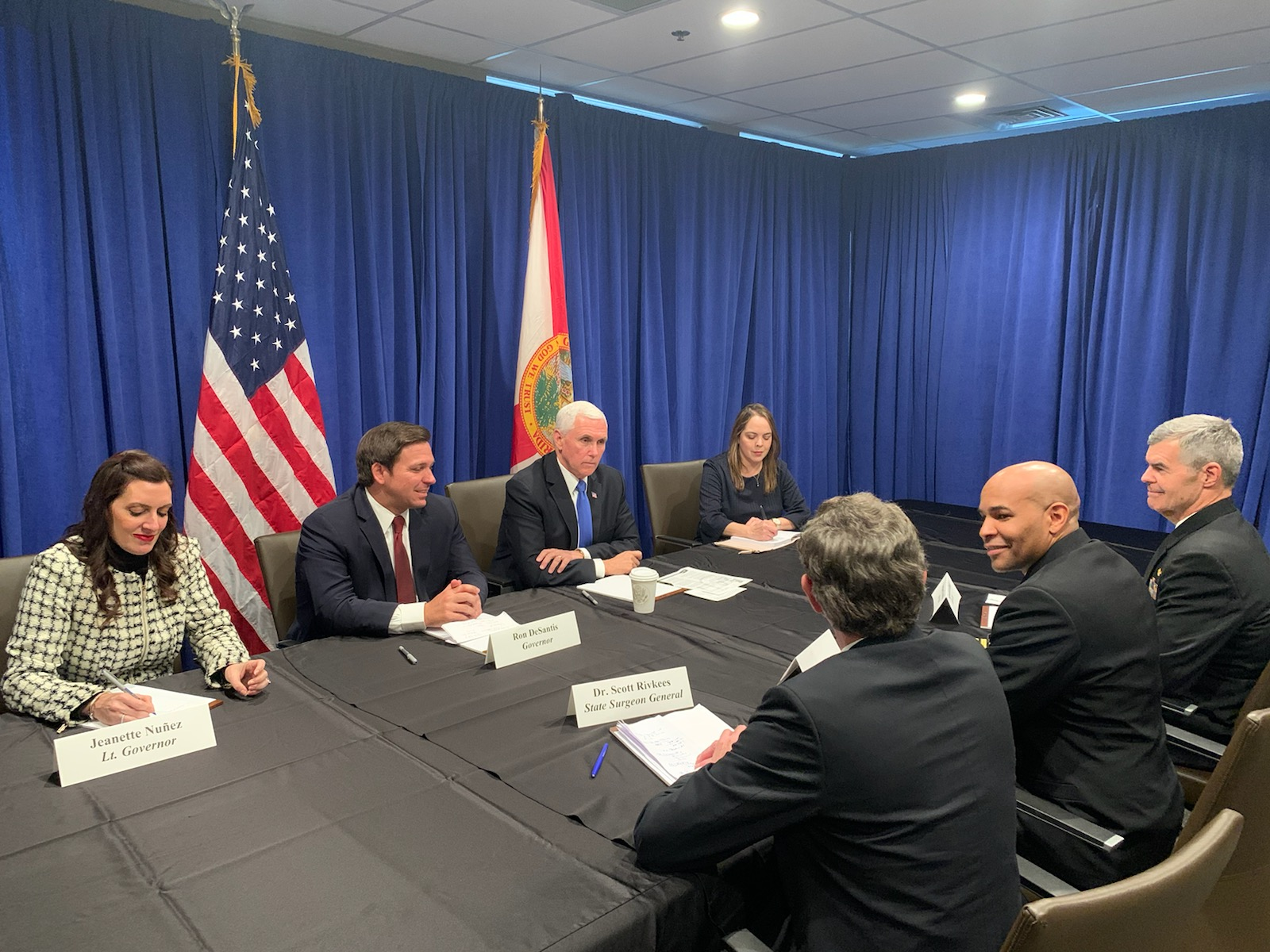
Rivkees meets with Jeanette Nuñez, Ron DeSantis, and Mike Pence in February 2020

On April 1, 2019, Rivkees was nominated by Florida Governor Ron DeSantis to become State Surgeon General and Secretary of Health of Florida, with broad support from the medical community. During the nomination process, Rivkees’ past experience in public health was questioned. He was confirmed with bipartisan support by the Florida State Senate by a vote of 30-9 on May 13, 2020. In August 2019, he declared a public health emergency in response to the Hepatitis A outbreak in the state. He implemented statewide efforts to reduce rates of newborn infant mortality, screen expectant mothers for substance-abuse to address the neonatal abstinence syndrome problem, initiated new programs to address problems related to drug abuse and initiated programs to address suicide and mental health issues, directed the implementation of new programs focusing on pediatric drowning prevention. He implemented a program to address the opioid epidemic. He also directed the initial development of the next phase of the State Health Improvement Plan.

He was responsible for playing a key role in the initial response to the COVID-19 pandemic in Florida by introducing the STEPS plan which involved social distancing and mitigation measures, testing and contact tracing, elderly and vulnerable protection, preparing and supporting health care, and stopping the introduction of COVID-19 to the state and long-term care facilities. He also played a role in the reopening of Florida K-12 schools in 2020. On March 1, 2020, Rivkees declared a public health emergency in response to COVID-19. During the course of the pandemic he issued several public health advisories. On April 15, 2020, Rivkees received national attention when it was reported that he was removed from a press conference after stating that prolonged mitigation measures against COVID-19 would be needed. In May 2021, Rivkees was recognized by the Florida Senate for his efforts. Rivkees served as State Surgeon General until September 2021, when the employee interchange agreement between the University of Florida and the Department of Health ended.

== Research ==
Rivkees has several areas of basic-science and clinical research focus. These include the development of biological clocks, circadian rhythms and melatonin receptors. He characterized receptors for adenosine and studies of the effects of caffeine during development. As recognition of his work on the developmental influences of adenosine and caffeine, in 2010, he was an invited participant in the 48th Nobel Mini-Symposium on Caffeine and Health in Frontiers in Medicine. In addition, he focused on the identification of agents to protect the developing brain and the development of novel therapeutics for thyroid disease. He has had more than 34 years of funding from the National Institutes of Health. He has more than 300 original reports, reviews, commentaries and chapters combined.

=== Impact on thyroidology ===
While at Indiana University, Rivkees initiated the Indiana Congenital Hypothyroidism Follow-up Program. While in Connecticut he was appointed to the State Genetics Advisory Program. He worked with the United States Senate Health Education Labor and Pension committee in drafting the Newborn Screening Saves Lives Act. At Yale he started and directed the Yale Pediatric Thyroid Center, the first of its kind in the country. He drafted seminal reports related to growth in juvenile acquired hypothyroidism, the use of radioactive iodine in the treatment of hyperthyroidism, and the treatment of pediatric thyroid cancer.

He is responsible for discovering the hidden safety problem of hepatotoxicity in children of the anti-thyroid medication propylthiouracil. This finding was the MedScape #1 Endocrine News Story and Alert of 2009, Endocrine Today Top Ten Endocrine Story of 2010. For this discovery he received a Special Recognition Award Lawson Wilkins Pediatric Endocrine Society and the Paul A. Starr Award from the American Thyroid Association.

=== Impact on pediatric endocrinology in other areas ===
Rivkees impacted clinical pediatric endocrinology with his description of the use of dexamethasone for the treatment of congenital adrenal hyperplasia, and the use of thiazide diuretics for the treatment of neonatal diabetes insipidus. For his work in the field of congenital adrenal hyperplasia and the publication of CAH: A Parent’s Guide, he was awarded the CARES Foundation, Physician of the Year, Pioneer Award.

== Awards and achievements ==
- 2018 American Academy of Pediatrics, Special Service Award
