= Rebekah Jones =

American data scientist and activist

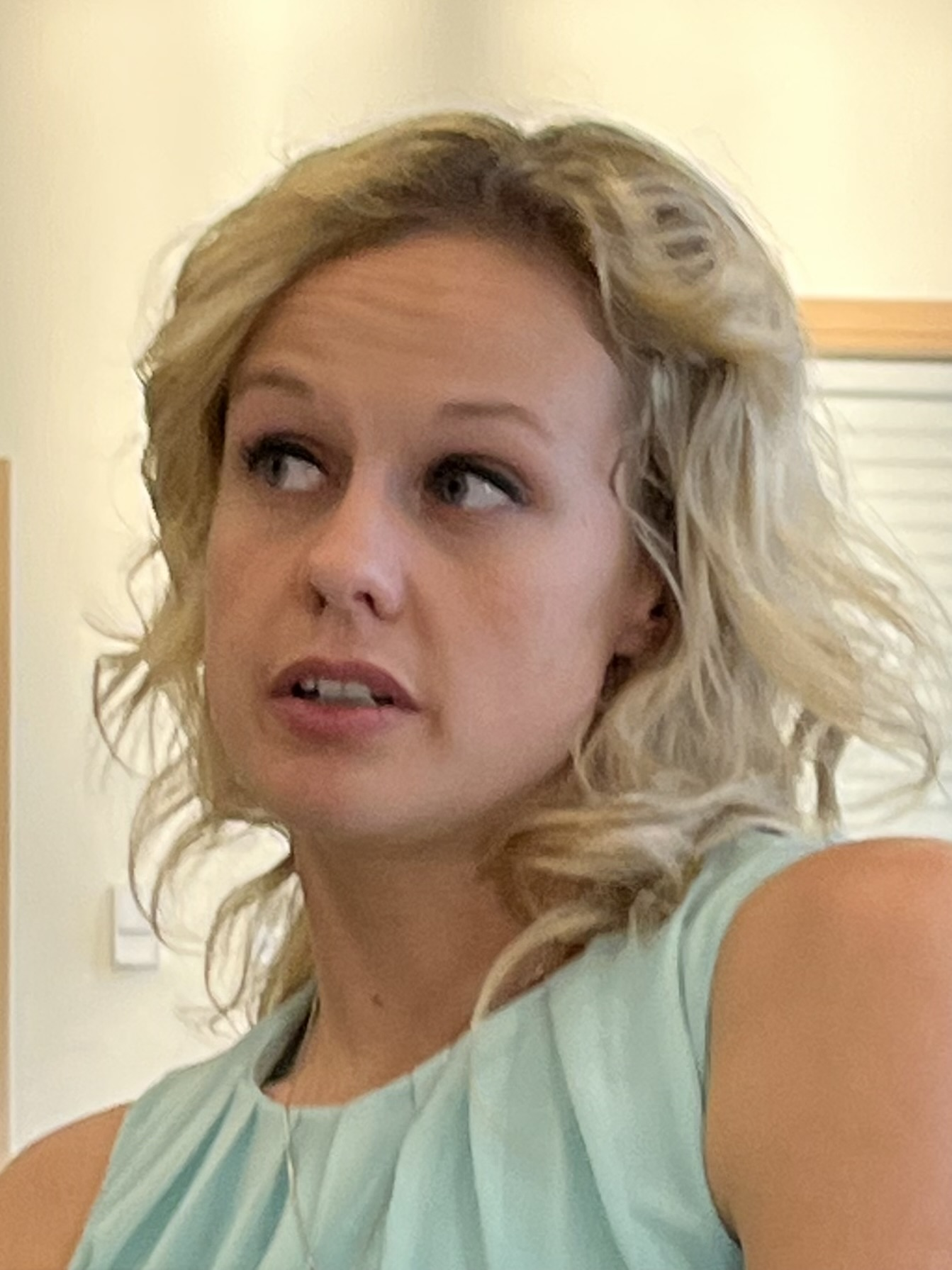
- Jones in 2022
- Born: July 25, 1989 (age 37); Windber, Pennsylvania, U.S.
- Education: Syracuse University (BA); Louisiana State University (MS); Florida State University
- Political party: Democratic
- Scientific career
- Fields: Geography
- Institutions: Louisiana State University; Florida State University
- Thesis: Using Native American Sitescapes to Extend the North American Paleotempestological Record through Coupled Remote Sensing and Climatological Analysis
- Academic advisors: Jane Read, Lynne Carter, Robert Rohli, and Matthew Bethel
- Website: geojones.org

Rebekah Jones (born July 25, 1989) is an American geographer, data scientist, (Note: Sources overwhelmingly refer to Jones as a data scientist. Spatial analysis using Geographic Information Systems is a subset of data science.) and activist. She is known for her COVID-19 activism in Florida, allegations against the Florida Department of Health and Florida Governor Ron DeSantis, an unsubstantiated whistleblower complaint after being fired, and several legal issues. She was referred to as a whistleblower and awarded with several honors, but many public officials and media outlets labeled her a conspiracy theorist after investigation into her and her allegations.

In May 2022, Florida's Office of Inspector General (OIG) dismissed a 2020 whistleblower complaint filed by Jones after she was fired by the state for insubordination. In May 2020, Jones was terminated from her position managing the team that created Florida's ArcGIS COVID-19 dashboard after being repeatedly reprimanded for sharing the department's work online without authorization. Jones alleged instead that she was told to manipulate the dashboard's data and that her firing was retaliation for her refusal. The OIG exonerated state health officials, finding her allegations to be unsubstantiated and unfounded. Jones later posted on social media a forgery of the dismissal letter from the Florida Commission on Human Relations, such that it appeared that her complaint had been validated.

In December 2022, she signed a deferred prosecution agreement admitting guilt to unauthorized use of the state's emergency alert system on November 10, 2020, which resulted in her home being searched under warrant by state police in December 2020. The execution of the warrant with armed police, widely referred to as a raid, was due to a 2016 battery charge against Jones by the Louisiana State University police. In 2023, Jones pled no-contest to a 2019 charge of cyberstalking a former Florida State University student. She was fired from both institutions.

Jones has a popular Twitter (X) account where she is a controversial figure and activist. Her viral tweets have resulted in multiple highly successful GoFundMe campaigns, earning more than $500,000, which has been criticized. Jones has used her Twitter account to make unsupported statements on a variety of topics, including COVID-19 and DeSantis, one of which NBC News called a conspiracy theory. She also instigated fights with academics, journalists, and public officials. She was suspended from Twitter in 2021 for platform manipulation and later reinstated. After a successful social media campaign for Democratic candidacy in Florida's 1st congressional district, she was defeated by Matt Gaetz in the 2022 U.S. House of Representatives elections in Florida.

== Early life and education ==
Jones was born in Windber, Pennsylvania, to blue-collar parents. At the age of nine, her family moved to Wiggins, Mississippi, where she spent most of her childhood. She grew up poor, often housing and food insecure. Jones attended Stone High School, where she missed months of school (Note: Jones told reporters that the school was destroyed during hurricane Katrina. Katrina made landfall as a category 3 tropical storm near Triumph, Louisiana on August 29, 2005. Storm surge affected Biloxi-Gulfport, Mississippi, 40 miles south of Wiggins. Stone High School served as the location of the American Red Cross relief headquarters for the area and a standby shelter.) during Hurricane Katrina in 2005. She says her experiences in Katrina made her interested in natural disasters. In her junior year, Jones was removed from class for refusing to stand for the Pledge of Allegiance and led other students to do the same after learning from civil liberties groups she was acting within her rights. She graduated from Chestnut Ridge Senior High School in 2007 after moving to Bedford, Pennsylvania to live with her grandparents.

Jones graduated cum laude from the S. I. Newhouse School of Public Communications and Maxwell School of Citizenship and Public Affairs at Syracuse University with dual degrees in geography and journalism in 2012. While at Syracuse, Jones was a features writer and the student business manager for The Daily Orange and worked as a special projects intern at the Syracuse Center of Excellence in Environmental and Energy Systems.

In 2014, she received a master's degree in geography and a minor in mass communication from Louisiana State University. In 2015, her research titled Quantifying Extreme Weather Event Impacts on the Northern Gulf Coast Using Landsat Imagery was published in the Journal of Coastal Research. While at LSU, she worked as a coastal resources scientist for the state of Louisiana and as a geospatial specialist for the Louisiana Sea Grant.

Jones was a graduate student in the Department of Geography at Florida State University from 2016 through 2018, where she worked on a doctoral dissertation until she was dismissed from the PhD program in 2019 due to misconduct in her teaching position.

== Florida Department of Health ==
In September 2018, she became a geographic information system (GIS) analyst at Florida Department of Health (DOH) in Tallahassee and worked on the agency's emergency response team during Hurricane Michael and Hurricane Dorian. Jones performed analysis and modeling of mapping and surveillance data to provide information to the public and state officials used to coordinate disaster response, like the organization of patient movement to open beds between interstate hospitals. In November 2019, she was appointed to a manager role within GIS handling analysis and tracking of environmental health data and health services.

=== COVID-19 dashboard team ===
In March 2020, Jones used Esri's ArcGIS software to create Florida Department of Health's COVID-19 dashboard. She managed the dashboard team for two months. The following month, Carina Blackmore, an epidemiologist and the director for the division, assembled a small team including Jones "to develop new data for a reopening plan." When the criteria supplied by the White House showed that highly populated counties were ready to open, but not rural counties, Blackmore suggested lower populations might be held to a different standard to account for natural social distancing. Jones opposed the use of federal guidelines to make low-population areas more resilient to small, containable spikes in cases and disagreed with the epidemiologists on her team about methodology by which the state evaluated readiness to reopen. She opposed the way the state computed test positivity rates and believes that positive results for antibody testing (Note: Antibody tests check for past infections while diagnostic tests check for current infections.) should be included in cumulative case totals, which outside epidemiologists don't recommend, as they can skew results.

=== Removal from COVID-19 team and firing ===
In May 2020, Florida news outlets reported a data field was removed from the dashboard data for less than 24 hours after a Miami Herald reporter made an inquiry to DOH about evidence they said could indicate an earlier community spread. The inquiry was handled by Jones's team. Shamarial Roberson, Deputy Secretary of Health, said the field was a self-reported date indicating when patients believed their symptoms began or may have come into contact with the virus. Division director Blackmore said she then instructed Jones to disable exporting data files to ensure the data matched what was in their PDF counterpart, which they were unaware Jones had published. Jones objected, claiming it was unethical. In emails she said, "This is the wrong call," and "I'm not pulling our primary resource for coronavirus data because he (Pritchard) (Note: Scott Pritchard is the former Interim Director of Infectious Disease Prevention and Investigations Section in the Bureau of Epidemiology's Division of Disease Control and Health Protection at the Department of Health. He left the DOH, and subsequently the state of Florida, after Governor Ron DeSantis announced his school reopening plan.) wants to stick it to journalists." Blackmore said the temporary removal was due to concerns about privacy and potential misunderstanding and misuse of the field. The following day, Jones was removed from the COVID-19 dashboard team. She threatened to quit and went on leave. She sent an email to a public listserv suggesting her removal from the dashboard team should cast doubt on the data's integrity, inferring it was punishment for her commitment to accessibility and transparency.

On May 18, Jones was fired for insubordination, after refusing an offer to resign. The Associated Press reported that state records detailed repeated warnings by her supervisor not to publicly discuss her work without permission, including releasing unauthorized charts. The spokesperson for Florida Governor Ron DeSantis said Jones was dismissed for making unilateral decisions about the dashboard without consulting others on the team, to which her superiors testified. Jones alleged she was fired because she refused to manipulate data to indicate reopening readiness in rural counties to align with the governor' reopening plan.

=== Whistleblower complaint ===
Jones filed a formal complaint in July 2020 for wrongful termination and misconduct of DOH officials. She was granted formal whistleblower protections by the Florida Office of Inspector General in May 2021 while investigation into her claims was ongoing.

Jones alleged that deputy health secretary Roberson ordered Jones to manually change the data to support reopening. While the subsequent May 4 reopening resulted in a surge in cases, DeSantis used an external task force, not the DOH, to make recommendations on reopening. The governor said, "It's not up to the health department to say a 'yes' or a 'no'." Jones alleged on Twitter that she was ordered to delete positive test results and deaths, and that the state was hiding such data to make the pandemic seem less deadly, which NBC News called a conspiracy theory. Discrepancies in death counts from Jones's understanding of the data came from nonresident deaths, which were forwarded to the deceased's home. DeSantis was criticized for reopening against the advice of epidemiologists.

In May 2022, the Florida Office of Inspector General published their findings that her claims were unsubstantiated and lacked sufficient evidence, and exonerated officials she accused of wrongdoing. The instruction to restrict access to raw data was not a violation of any governing directive. Marc Caputo of NBC News wrote that "the independent report paints a portrait of an employee who did not understand public health policy or the significance of epidemiological data, did not have high-level access to crucial information and leveled claims that made professional health officials 'skeptical.'" Several news outlets and public officials have since called her credibility and narrative into question, referring to her as a "fraud," "grifter," and "conspiracy theorist."

=== Subsequent activities ===
On October 26, 2022, Jones posted an altered image of a letter from the Florida Commission on Human Relations on her Instagram account, which she said proved that her whistleblower claims were validated. The caption read "Someone let Marc Caputo know he's a lying sack of s--t." The differences included adding a statement that she had "demonstrated a) violation of law 'which create and presents a substantial and specific danger to the public's health, safety, or welfare;' or b) actual or suspected 'gross mismanagement' as defined by the Act, …" and references to specific rules related to firing state employees. There were also inconsistencies in the text's formatting and style. She subsequently deleted the post, but maintains that the version Caputo received from FCHR was the forgery. The Pensacola News Journal verified the digital copy they received was not modified after the day it was created and mailed to Jones.

After her firing, Jones launched an independent COVID-19 data dashboard for the state of Florida called Florida COVID Action, which gained her an award from Forbes and recognition by Fortune. A Florida spokesperson criticized Jones's COVID-19 dashboard for including antibody tests, for counting virus tests with antibody tests, and for counting non-resident deaths. In 2020, she secured a partnership between Florida COVID Action and non-profit FinMango on a national project. The COVID Monitor, co-founded by Oscar Wahltinez, a FinMango board member who also worked at Google, used open data to track COVID-19's spread at schools, with the help of Google tools such as Google Cloud. Jones repeatedly mischaracterized this as a partnership with the multinational, to which it protested.

In March 2023, Jones filed a lawsuit against the Florida Department of Health, the state Surgeon General and a former deputy secretary seeking reinstatement, back wages, compensation for emotional distress and punitive damages for being fired in May 2020. Jones claims that her due process and free speech rights were violated in retaliation for being a whistleblower. On February 25, 2025, Judge Angela Dempsey granted the defendants' motions for summary judgment, ruling that Deputy Secretary of Health Shamarial Roberson and the Florida Department of Health acted lawfully in terminating Rebekah Jones for documented insubordination, and that in the eyes of the court, Rebekah Jones is not a legitimate whistleblower, despite her claims.

Jones also alleged that the governor's office was micromanaging the health department and for misleading the public about the state's vaccination data. These claims were substantiated, but were not a part of the whistleblower complaint Jones filed. The state of Florida settled a public records lawsuit in October 2023 filed by Carlos Guillermo Smith and the non-profit Florida Center for Government Accountability after withholding COVID-19 data from the public.

On July 29, 2026, Florida's First District Court of Appeal affirmed the trial court's summary judgments in favor of the Florida Department of Health, state surgeon general Joseph Ladapo, and former deputy health secretary Shamarial Roberson. The court held that Jones had not made a disclosure protected by Florida's public-sector whistleblower law before her termination and rejected her proposed theory of “preemptive retaliation,” finding that the statute did not cover threatened or anticipated disclosures. The court also affirmed the dismissal of her First Amendment retaliation claims, concluding that her public statements concerning the COVID-19 dashboard were made in her capacity as a Department of Health employee rather than as a private citizen, and that Jones is not and never was a 'whistleblower'.

== 2022 Congressional candidacy ==
In May 2021, Jones announced that she would not run for congress, either in Maryland where she was living at the time, or in Florida, stating that she did not feel safe running in Florida, and that she was not well-enough prepared to run in Maryland. A day after her suspension from Twitter in June, she announced her intention to run against incumbent Matt Gaetz in the 2022 U.S. House elections but subsequently downplayed her announcement in another post, saying that if a Republican or Democratic challenger did not appear, "Well, November 2022 is a long ways away". Jones launched her campaign for Florida's first congressional district in July 2021. Although she filed with the FEC as an independent, she later had to change her filing to run as a Democrat due to voting and election law changes enacted before Jones declared her candidacy.

On July 15, 2022, a lawsuit was filed against Jones by her primary campaign opponent, Margaret "Peggy" Schiller and a Northwest Florida resident, asserting that Jones violated a state law that requires someone to be a member of a political party for a full year ahead of qualifying if they are running for that party's nomination. The suit sought an injunction to remove Jones from the primary ballot. She was removed from the ballot on August 5 after a judge ruled she failed to meet political party registration requirements. On August 12, Jones was granted a motion to stay with regards to her appeal of the ruling, allowing her to continue her campaign. On August 22, 2022, the 1st District Court of Appeals reversed the lower court ruling, letting Jones stay on the ballot as a valid candidate. On August 23, 2022, she won the Democratic primary election, and ran against Gaetz in the November general election, which she lost on November 8, 2022.

== Legal issues ==
=== Assault on LSU police officer ===
In Louisiana in 2016 Jones was arrested and charged by the LSU Police Department with one count each of battery on a police officer and remaining after forbidden, plus two counts of resisting arrest after refusing to vacate a LSU office upon being dismissed from her staff position.

=== Unauthorized access of state computer systems ===
==== Armed execution of search warrant (raid) ====
On December 7, 2020, at 8:30 a.m., Florida Department of Law Enforcement (FDLE) executed a search warrant upon Jones' home for suspected unauthorized access of Florida Department of Health computer systems. FDLE said in a statement she was suspected of accessing the system to send an unauthorized message, "speak up before another 17,000 people are dead," to members of the State Emergency Response Team on November 10, 2020, which originated from her home's IP address. Jones denied sending the unauthorized message. The execution of the search warrant with armed police officers, widely referred to as a police raid, was defended by the FDLE as necessary due to Jones' criminal history, including a battery charge on a police officer. Her viral tweets of home security footage of the encounter, which prompted the characterization that it was a raid, helped raise more than $200,000 of more than $500,000 on one of her GoFundMe campaigns.

U.S. civil liberties watchdog Electronic Frontier Foundation warned about over-reliance on IP addresses and called for the need to reform overbroad computer crime laws. Ars Technica reported that the affidavit had stated that the emergency alert system at the time the unauthorized message was sent used a single username and password. Those credentials were publicly posted on the DOH website during the interval that the unauthorized message was sent.

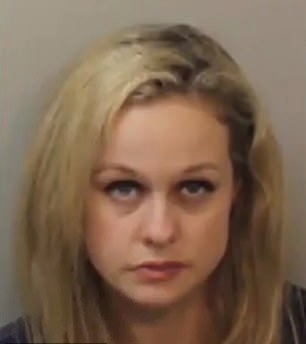
Rebekah Jones in 2021 Mugshot

==== Arrest and deferred prosecution agreement ====
Jones turned herself in on January 18, 2021, two days after an arrest warrant was issued for Jones by the FDLE following a finding of probable cause that she breached the system, sent the unauthorized message, and illegally downloaded the confidential information of more than 20,000 state employees. On December 8, 2022, she entered into a deferred prosecution agreement to avoid trial, where among other requirements, she would have to admit guilt, pay a $20,000 fine to the Florida Department of Law Enforcement, do community service, and see a mental health professional monthly.

Jones posted online that the charges had been dropped, that she never admitted to guilt, and referred to the fine as extortion. The prosecutor of the case said that she mischaracterized the plea agreement. Jones raised more than $10,000 of $352,668 on a GoFundMe campaign in the five days after the agreement was made.

==== Dropped lawsuit ====
Jones filed a lawsuit on December 20, 2020, against the Florida Department of Law Enforcement and Commissioner Rick Swearingen alleging that the police obtained a "sham" search warrant whose true purpose was to retaliate against her. Her suit claimed that one of the FDLE agents grabbed her "without consent, authorization, or legitimate basis" while searching her home. She also alleged that the FDLE violated her First Amendment free speech rights, and had performed an unlawful search and seizure when they confiscated computers and her personal cell phone. Attorneys for Jones sought damages and a jury trial, stating in the 19-page lawsuit, which was filed in Leon County court, that "They entered her home with guns drawn, terrorizing her family." On February 6, 2021, court records show Jones dropped the lawsuit against the Florida Department of Law Enforcement, although the disposition of her seized property remained unresolved. Body camera footage was later released by FDLE, though this footage did not show the officers entering the house, as seen in the footage from Jones's home security cameras.

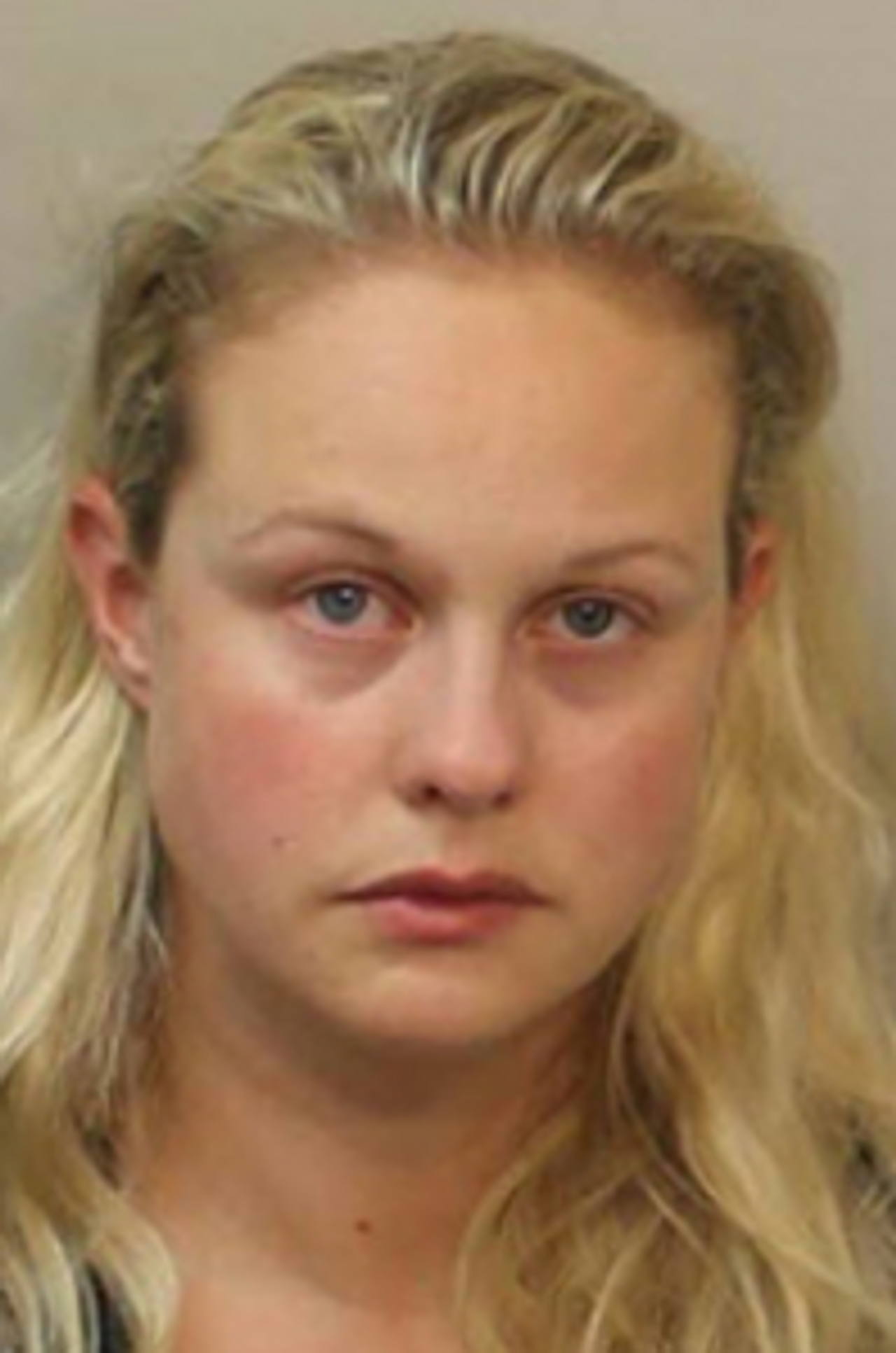
Rebekah Jones in 2019 Mugshot

=== Cyberstalking of FSU student ===
On June 7, 2023, Jones pled no-contest to a 2019 misdemeanor cyberstalking charge. Beginning in 2017, Jones was accused of harassing and stalking a former student while she was a teacher at FSU. In July 2019, Jones was charged with stalking, cyberstalking, and sexual cyberharassment, after she published revenge porn of the victim and details of their sexual encounters on social media. Other dropped charges related to the case include felony robbery, trespass, criminal mischief, and contempt of court stemming from an alleged violation of a domestic violence restraining order. According to police reports, Jones was fired for allegedly threatening to give a failing grade to the victim's roommate.

== Twitter activity ==
As of December 2020, Jones had more than 340,000 followers on Twitter. Jones is a controversial figure and activist who has used the account to make unsupported statements about issues such as COVID-19, DeSantis, and other topics and people. She also frequently instigated fights with public officials, politicians, and academics. Jones tweeted that Shamarial Roberson, Florida's deputy secretary for health, was a fraud and a murderer. Jones attacked epidemiologists Natalie Dean and Jason Salemi for disputing the accuracy of Jones' claims. Salemi left Twitter in response to Jones's behavior. Jones also engaged in a feud with Christina Pushaw, who wrote an article critical of Jones.

In August 2020, Jones used Twitter to attack Jon Taylor, a PhD candidate at Florida Atlantic University who had created a COVID-19 tracker with his advisor, Rebel A. Cole, to correct for a potentially misleading statistic and present the data in a way more easily understood by the public. Jones initially referred to Taylor as a "quack" and a "fraud", but as the tracker gained media attention, she tweeted that Taylor and Cole had sexually harassed her, and tagged the university. Jones also emailed Daniel Gropper, the College of Business dean, who escalated the report to the vice president of the university and the chief of the university's police department. The chief asked Jones to substantiate her claims, but received no response. Jones later deleted the tweets and denied engaging in the defamation.

In June 2021, Jones was suspended from Twitter for violations of the Twitter rules on spam and platform manipulation. DeSantis's office commented upon the suspension, with a spokesperson calling it "long overdue" and accusing Jones of spreading "defamatory conspiracy theories".

In April 2023, Jones tweeted that DeSantis had kidnapped her teenage son; the tweet received tens of millions of views. Jones had turned her son voluntarily into police after the issuance of a valid arrest warrant. Jones used GoFundMe to raise at least $7,000 through her viral Twitter posts. In December 2023, her son pled no contest to threatening a mass shooting. The judge withheld adjudication of his case, placing him on "an indefinite period of probation not to exceed his 19th birthday," while he complied with sentencing requirements, including 50 hours of community service. The familial relationship was mentioned by the media because of Jones's public statements about the case. Also in April 2023, Jones tweeted unsubstantiated statements about a private citizen of Kokomo, Indiana being a cyber terrorist.

== Public perception ==
Though she was widely referred to as a "whistleblower" and "hero", following official investigations and her Twitter activity, public officials and the media questioned her credibility, referring to her as a "fraud," "grifter," and "conspiracy theorist." NBC News and The Washington Post called some of her COVID-19 claims conspiracy theories.

Conservative media outlets Fox News, National Review, and Washington Examiner referred to her as a "conspiracist," "conspiracy theorist," and "grifter," often criticizing liberal media coverage of her as puffery that ignored available evidence. Fox News reported on a video made by progressive journalist Ana Kasparian in which she apologized for what she said was a bias against DeSantis and failing to do her due diligence on Jones and her claims. Jones's use of multiple GoFundMe campaigns and the manner in which she uses them was criticized by Vice after she Tweeted false claims about her son being kidnapped by the governor of Florida.

== Honors ==
In 2020, Jones was recognized by Fortune magazine's 40 Under 40 in Healthcare for founding Florida COVID Action. She was named Forbes's 2020 Technology Person of the Year for creating alternative Florida COVID-19 tracking dashboards. She won Constantine Cannon's 2020 Whistleblower of the Year award. In 2023, she was presented with the Martha Mitchell Pillar Award at the Whistleblower Summit & Film Festival.
