= University of Georgia (Tbilisi) =

Private university in Tbilisi, Georgia

- University of Georgia logo
- Motto: Libertas, Humanitas, Excellentia
- Motto in English: Freedom, Humanity, Excellence
- Type: Private
- Established: 2004; 22 years ago
- Chancellor: Konstantine Topuria
- President: Giuli Alasania
- Students: 5200
- Undergraduates: 4680
- Postgraduates: 505
- Location: 77, M. Kostava str, 0171, Tbilisi, Georgia; 41°43′26″N 44°46′40″E
- Website: https://www.ug.edu.ge/en

The University of Georgia (Georgian: საქართველოს უნივერსიტეტი, romanized: sakartvelos universit'et'i) is a private university founded in Tbilisi, in the country of Georgia, in 2004.

== History ==
The University of Georgia was founded in 2004 under the name of "Georgian University of Social Sciences". The University Founders were doctor of Historical Sciences, Professor Giuli Alasania, and doctor of Historical Sciences, Professor Manana Sanadze.

From 2005 to 2007, the university developed and grew significantly. Master's programs were added to the Bachelor's Programs during these years. By 2007 the university had already received its first PhD program students. In 2010, for the first time in the post-Soviet era, the United States Agency OPIC (Overseas Private Investment Corporation) invested multimillion dollars in the development of the university's infrastructure.

== Schools (Faculties) of the University of Georgia ==
- The School of Arts and Humanities
- The School of Law
- The School of Social Sciences
- The School of Informatics, Engineering and Mathematics
- The School of Health Sciences and Public Health
- The School of Business, Economics and Management

=== School of Arts and Humanities ===
The School of Arts and Humanities was founded in 2005. The School consists of three departments:

- The Department of Philology and European Languages
- The Department of History and Asian Studies
- The Department of Archeology, Anthropology and Art

The School offers certificate courses in various languages and preparation courses for national entry examinations and national Master's entry examinations. The School organizes national and international scientific conferences and actively participates in scientific research work.

==== Programs ====
BA

- Archeology;
- Oriental Studies;
- English Philology;
- History (Georgia, World);
- Georgian Philology;
- Art;
- English Philology (in English);
- Architecture and Design;
- English Program in Architecture and Design.

MA

- English Philology;
- Cultural and Social Anthropology;
- History of Georgia;
- Education Administration (in English).

PhD

- History;
- Cultural and Social Anthropology;
- English Philology.

=== School of Law ===
Established in 2005, the School of Law of the University of Georgia offers accredited BA, MA and PhD programs. The primary teaching process is distinguished by its education based on general and specific instruction, case law teaching, as well as simulated trials and appeals. The program is replenished with English subjects. The teaching methods are primarily focused on developing professional skills for the practice of law, with advanced study in advanced theory. A wide range of subjects complies with the students’ interests in the fields of public, private, criminal and international law.

Starting in September 2016, the School of Law launched the International Business Law (IBL) program, which is the first of its kind in Georgia.

==== Programs ====
BA

- Law

MA

- Law
- International Business Law (English)

PhD

- Law

Some resources

The School of Law is home to the TOLES Legal English Centre Georgia. The Test of Legal English Skills (TOLES) is an international exam, based in the UK, which assesses a legal practitioner's knowledge of practical English language skills. UG is the only TOLES test center in the Caucasus region. Legal English is an important part of the School of Law's curriculum; all bachelor students must take four semesters of English and one semester of Legal English.

Besides the practical one, the law school also focuses on the scientific-research component. The Georgian, German and International Criminal Law Institute conducts research at the school, offers regular workshops, public lectures, scientific conferences and competitions in moot court processes. The aim of the Institute is to promote the development of criminal dogmatism and practice. Due to this fact, its activities are not limited to pure theoretical studies, but they are given adequate attention to practical problems in material or formal criminal law.

A simulation Courtroom allows students to receive hands on, practical experience of a courtroom. The School of Law offers summer schools for various courses such as criminal law, private law, public law, etc.

=== School of Social Sciences ===
The School of Social Sciences was founded in 2004.

==== Programs ====
BA

- Political Science
- Journalism
- International Relations
- Public Relations
- Psychology

MA

- International Relations
- Public Relations and Advertising
- Applied Psychology

PhD

- Political Science
- Mass Communication

=== School of Informational Technologies ===
The educational programs are developed based on the analysis and experience of similar programs at leading foreign universities. IT programs comprise the courses delivered by international certifying courses of Microsoft, Oracle and Cisco Academies.

==== Programs ====
BA

- Electrical and Computer Engineering; (Geo/Eng);
- English Bachelor Program in Engineering;
- Informational Technologies;
- Mathematics;
- English Bachelor Program in Information Technology.

MA

- Informational technologies;
- Applied Sciences;
- English Master's Program in Information Technology.

PhD

- Computer Technologies;
- Exact, Natural and Computer Sciences.
- UG Limes Robotics Academy - is the only academy in Georgia that enables bachelor's and master's students of electrical and electronic engineering, mathematics and computer science to conduct their own research and to teach to school children. UG-LIMES is one of the main organizations in Georgia, which defines STEM, programming and robotics learning policy.

=== School of Health Sciences and Public Health ===
The School of Health Sciences and Public Health was founded in 2005. The educational programs are established with the contribution of Georgian healthcare experts. The study program was developed by Georgian and foreign specialists and universities of Scranton, Central Florida and Tromsø, Norway.

The School of Health Sciences and Public Health is a member of European Public Health Association (EUPHA) and represents Georgia. It is a member of American Association of University Programs in Health Administration (AUPHA).

==== Programs ====
BA

- Health Care Administration
- Nursing
- Pharmacy

MA

- Health Care Administration
- Pharmacy Management Program
- Pharmacy Program

PhD

- Public Health

Single-Cycle

- Dental Program in English
- English Program of Medical Education

=== School of Economics, Business, and Management ===
The School of Economics, Business and Management was founded in 2004.

==== Programs ====
BA

- Business Administration ( Marketing and Banking, Accounting and Audit, Management)
- Tourism
- Economics
- Public Administration

MA

- Business Administration
- Public Administration

PhD

- Business Administration

== International recognition ==
The university cooperates with the European and US leading universities and offers exchange programs at various European universities for one semester or a year. Thus the university has exchange programs within the individual cooperation, Erasmus Plus.

== Career services ==
The office of career services regularly offers trainings to students to improve skills necessary for career development. In order to promote student employment, job fairs on campus are held several times a year, where leading companies and the representatives of public sector take part.

== Programs for international students ==
BA

- English Philology
- Electrical and Computer Engineering
- Business Administration (Marketing and Banking, Accounting and Audit, Management)
- Nursing
- Pharmacy

MA

- Education Administration
- International Business Law
- Business Administration

Single-Cycle

- Dental Program
- Medical Education

== Admission ==
Citizens of Georgia who apply should successfully pass Unified National Entrance Examinations. Foreign high-school graduates who received complete general education abroad or its equivalent and the last two years of complete general education studying abroad, or students who lived abroad for the last two or more years and who are currently studying abroad in higher educational institutions recognized by the legislation of the host countries, will be able to enter the program without passing Uniform National Entrance Examinations, according to Order No.224/N of the Minister of Education and Science of Georgia (December 29, 2011).
