= Christina Pushaw =

American political consultant and press secretary

- Born: Christina Maria Pushaw; September 3, 1990 (age 36); Washington
- Education: University of Southern California (BA); Johns Hopkins University (MA)
- Occupations: Political aide; press secretary
- Political party: Republican

Christina Maria Pushaw (born September 3, 1990) is an American political aide who served as rapid response director for the 2024 presidential campaign of Ron DeSantis. She is a member of the Republican Party.

== Early life and education ==
Pushaw was born in Washington, where her father worked as a lawyer at Davis Wright Tremaine in Seattle. She spent most of her childhood in Malibu, California and Florida where her father worked as a visiting professor to Florida State University in 1999. As a teenager, her father taught law at Pepperdine University. She attended a private high school.

She obtained a bachelor's degree in history from the University of Southern California in 2012.

In 2017, she earned a master's degree in International Relations and Economics from Johns Hopkins School of Advanced International Studies.

== Early career, time in Georgia, and Mikheil Saakashvili ==
Pushaw volunteered for John McCain's 2008 presidential campaign; he supported Georgia during its war with Russia saying "today we are all Georgians." During 2012, she volunteered at the Ronald Reagan Presidential Library, where she encountered Mikheil Saakashvili, the President of Georgia, during a speech he gave and other appearances over the following year around Simi Valley, California. Saakashvili said that Reagan "defines who we Georgians are."

For a year after she graduated she worked as a recruiter at an IT firm in Pasadena, California.

In 2013, she moved to Georgia, originally intending to be part of a Saakashvili program for native English speakers to teach English, but ended up working in a few different educational positions. She also formed a Georgian non-profit, New Leaders Initiative, to teach young Georgians about democracy and international affairs. Pushaw wrote an article "The Manchurian Candidate” in a former Russian Georgia publication. During 2013 and 2014, Pushaw's peers and colleagues said that she said she traveled with Saakashvili and showed pictures she had taken with him telling them she had just been to Batumi.

In 2015, she left Georgia and moved to Washington, D.C. to attend graduate school. One of her peers said that she had told them she was born in Ukraine, where Saakashvili had served in the military and attended college, and had been adopted by Americans. Giuli Alasania, Saakashvili's mother said that Pushaw told her the same story. While doing her graduate field research in Ukraine, her class met with Saakashvili.

In 2017, Pushaw began working at a firm founded by Charles Koch in public relations called America at In Pursuit Of. From June 2017 to August 2019, Pushaw worked for Stand Together, a philanthropic organization also founded by Koch as an international political consultant. At Stand Together, she said she worked on the confirmation of Supreme Court Justice Brett Kavanaugh and the passing of the 2017 Tax Cuts and Jobs Act. In late 2017, Pushaw organized a pro-Saakashvili rally at the Embassy of Ukraine. In the resume she later provided to Ron DeSantis, she wrote that she worked as his communications and media advisor part-time during December 2017. She volunteered for his staff during 2018 and joined his staff full-time in 2019. She worked for him until 2020.

== Career ==
In June 2022, the Department of Justice reached out to Pushaw and asked her to register as a foreign agent per the Foreign Agents Registration Act. She hired former United States Attorney for the District of Columbia, Michael R. Sherwin, to represent her for the FARA registration. The act requires "foreign agents", defined as individuals or entities engaged in domestic lobbying or advocacy for foreign governments, organizations, or persons ("foreign principals"), to register with the Department of Justice (DOJ) and disclose their relationship, activities, and related financial compensation.

=== Journalism ===
Pushaw worked as an freelance journalist and had work published in national conservative outlets like The National Interest and Human Events. In February 2021, Pushaw published an article in Human Events criticizing Rebekah Jones, a Florida Department of Health employee who was fired in May 2020 for insubordination. It was the first national story to point out holes in Jones claims and brought her to the attention of DeSantis' administration.

=== Work for Ron DeSantis ===
In March 2021, Pushaw wrote a letter to the governor's office expressing interest in working for DeSantis' communication team. She was then hired as press secretary for Florida Governor Ron DeSantis in May 2021. Matt Dixon with Politico noted she had an unorthodox and aggressive style and was hostile to media outlets perceived to be critical of DeSantis. She worked in the position until August 2022 before leaving to join DeSantis's 2022 gubernatorial reelection and later 2024 presidential campaign teams as rapid response director.

In August 2021, Pushaw's Twitter account was locked for 12 hours for "harassing behavior". She demanded the Associated Press change a report that a DeSantis donor had invested in a COVID-19 treatment, Regeneron, that DeSantis had been promoting. She called for her social media followers to "drag them" but said she did not mean to call for violence, that it was a slang term, and she deleted the tweet so as to not be misunderstood. Viktorya Vilk with PEN America did confirm that one slang definition defines "drag them" as "to roast (make fun of/mock) someone very hard"; however, it also seems to "imply or encourage people to go on the attack."

In November 2021, she claimed that the Republic of Georgia's decision to implement a vaccine passport system might have been influenced by a recent meeting between the country's government and a member of the Rothschild family, despite the fact that the meeting in question had taken place several months before the decision was announced. She later retracted the claim after stating that it had been misinterpreted.

In January 2022, she deleted a social media post after facing backlash. In the post, she questioned if protestors wearing Nazi symbols were genuine or there to generate backlash, similar to an incident the previous year meant to smear Glenn Youngkin who was running for governor of Virginia.

She posted on social media in support of the Parental Rights in Education Act, calling the "Don't Say Gay" nickname given by its opponents inaccurate: "The bill that liberals inaccurately call 'Don't Say Gay' would be more accurately described as an Anti-Grooming Bill. If you're against the Anti-Grooming Bill, you are probably a groomer or at least you don't denounce the grooming of 4-8 year old children. Silence is complicity. This is how it works, Democrats, and I didn't make the rules." Florida Rep. Carlos Guillermo Smith responded, stating it was a bigotted attack against LGBTQ people and calling for her to resign. In a statement to AP News, she stated "I have never stated that all groomers are LGBT, all LGBT people are groomers, or anything of that nature."

In September 2022, Pushaw gave a speech at the National Conservatism Conference in Miami, Florida. In her speech, Pushaw suggested conservatives be aware of "media activists" who "see themselves not as journalists, not as reporters, not as investigators but as activists, but as advocates, as political operatives, as gatekeepers and as arbiters of truth. Like they believe that they can define reality. If, you know, they stick to their talking points and censor and attack all those and discredit those dissenting views." Ron DeSantis was one of the keynote speakers at the event.
