= Giuli Alasania =

Georgian historian and public figure (1946)

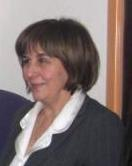
Giuli Alasania (2006)

Giuli Alasania (Georgian: გიული ალასანია, [ɡiuli alasania], born 11 November 1946 in Tbilisi) is a Georgian historian and public figure. Her publications include 130 papers and 10 monographs. She is the mother of the third president of Georgia, Mikheil Saakashvili.

== Biography ==
Alasania graduated from the Faculty of Oriental Studies of the Tbilisi State University (1969) and in 1973 received a Ph.D. degree in History. In 1987 she received a degree of a Doctor of Historical Sciences.

Her professional career includes tenures at the following organizations:

- head of the Department of Source Studies, Javakhishvili Institute of History and Ethnology (1989–2006)
- Professor of the Tbilisi State University (since 1990)
- Vice-Rector of the International Black Sea University (2000–2014)
- founder and President of the University of Georgia (since 2004).
- Research Manager at the American University, Transnational Crime and Corruption Center (2005–2008)

She is a member of:

- the Commission on the Sources of the History of Georgia of the Presidium of the Georgian National Academy of Sciences
- the editorial board of the international journal Central Asia and the Caucasus (Sweden)
- the board of Romulado Del Bianco Foundation.

She has organized a number of international conferences and has participated in international scientific conferences.

== Research and publications ==
Alasania had a fellowship at the University of Mississippi (1996), one at the University of Maryland, College Park in the Center for International development and Conflict Management (1996–1996), a fellowship at Central European University (CEU) (2000) and served as facilitator of the program of the School principles (Partners in Education), organized by ACTR/ACCELS, Washington, D.C., Bozeman, Montana (2003).

Her publications include 130 papers and 10 monographs in the fields of the source studies of history of Georgia and the Caucasus, history of the Middle East, history of Turks and Turkey, relations of Georgians and Turks, history of the Georgian culture, and national self-determination.

== Awards ==
- Prize for young scholars (1980)
- Prize for the contribution to Turkish-Studies. Turkish linguistic society (2004)
- “Golden wing” (2007), For the contribution to the Turkish culture (2012)
- I Javakhishvili prize of Georgian Academy of Sciences (2012), Medal of Del Bianco Foundation (2013).
