= State Surgeon General =

Public health spokesperson for U.S. states

A State Surgeon General is the operational head and senior spokesperson on public health in a single state of the United States of America, the state equivalent of the Surgeon General of the United States.

Pennsylvania created the position of "physician general" in 1996. Michigan had their first surgeon general in 2003, followed by Arkansas and Florida in 2007. In 2019, California became the fifth state to establish such an office.

== List of positions ==
- Surgeon General of Arkansas
- Surgeon General of California
- Surgeon General of Florida
- Physician General of Pennsylvania
- Surgeon General of Michigan
- Surgeon General of Louisiana
- Surgeon General of Delaware

== See also ==
- State governments of the United States
- State constitutional officer (United States)
- Surgeon general
