= Joseph Ladapo =

American physician (born 1978)

Joe Ladapo
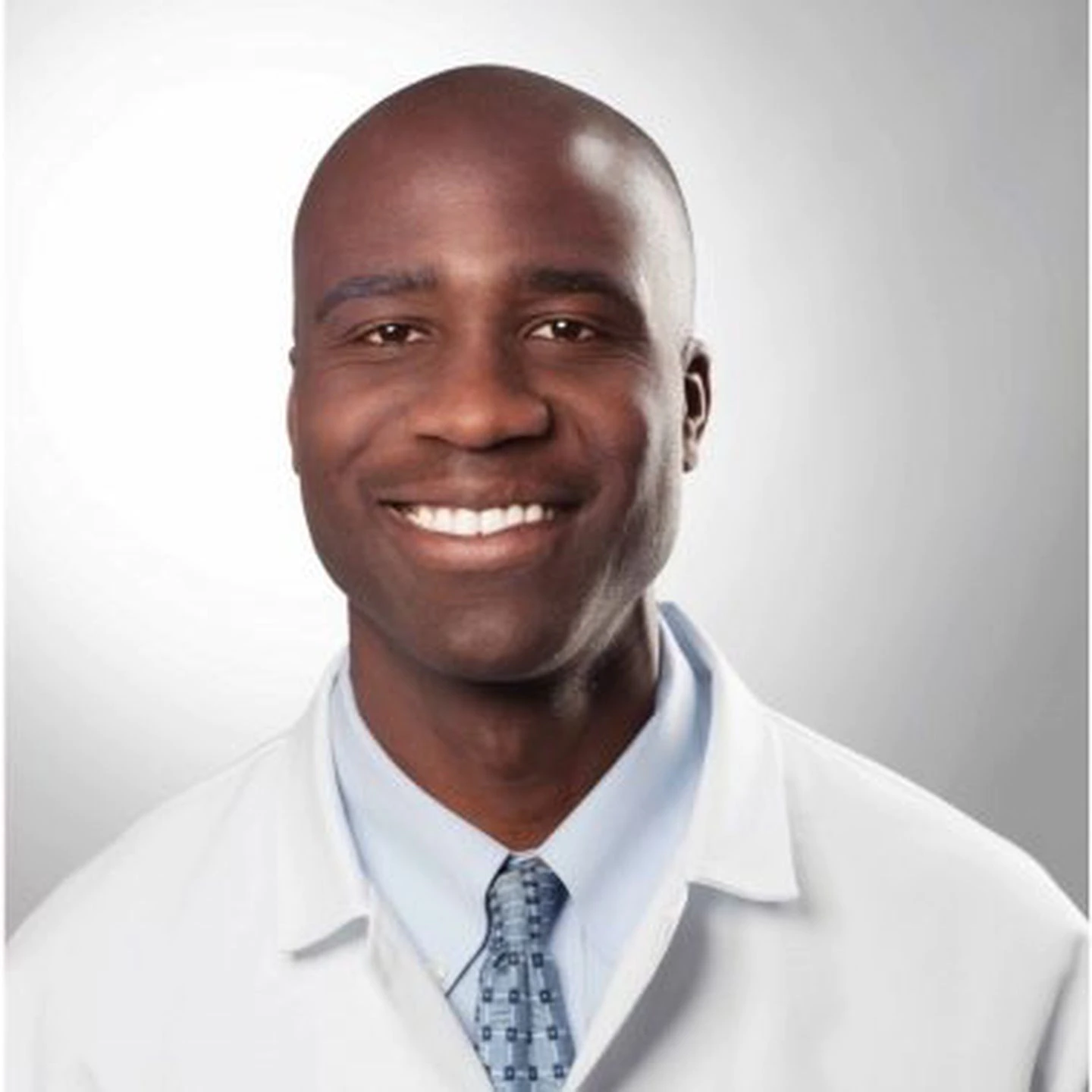

Surgeon General of Florida
- Incumbent
- Assumed office September 21, 2021
- Governor: Ron DeSantis
- Preceded by: Scott Rivkees

Personal details
- Born: Joseph Abiodun Ladapo; December 16, 1978 (age 47) Nigeria
- Education: Wake Forest University (BA); Harvard University (MD, PhD)

Joseph Abiodun Ladapo (born December 16, 1978) is a Nigerian-American physician serving as the surgeon general of Florida since 2021.

Ladapo is best known for his opposition to COVID-19 mitigation measures and promotion of COVID-19 misinformation. Ladapo has promoted unproven treatments, opposed vaccine and mask mandates, questioned the safety of COVID-19 vaccines, and contradicted professional medical organizations.

On September 3, 2025, Ladapo compared all vaccine mandates to slavery: "Every last one is wrong and drips with disdain and slavery." He followed this with: "If we want to move toward a perfect world, a better world, we can't do it by enslaving people in terrible philosophies and taking away people's freedoms."

On September 7, 2025, Ladapo said on CNN's State of the Union that vaccine mandates are not an issue of science but of "right and wrong."

After immigrating to the United States from Nigeria, Ladapo graduated from Wake Forest University and earned a M.D. and a Ph.D. in health policy from Harvard University. He served as a professor of medicine at New York University before being tenured at the University of California, Los Angeles, prior to his appointment to his current position by Florida Governor Ron DeSantis. Ladapo has opposed gender-affirming care and counseling for transgender and nonbinary minors.

In September 2025, Ladapo, in his capacity as Florida surgeon general, compared vaccine mandates to slavery when announcing Florida's plans to eliminate all vaccine mandates, including those for children attending public schools. This announcement was met with grave concern from the American Academy of Pediatrics and the Florida Education Association, among others.

== Early life and education ==
Ladapo, who is of Yoruba heritage, was born in Nigeria, the son of a microbiologist. He immigrated to the United States at age five with his family. In his memoir, Ladapo said he had been traumatized by sexual abuse from a babysitter.

Ladapo graduated magna cum laude with a Bachelor of Arts degree in chemistry from Wake Forest University in 2000, and was a varsity track athlete at the university. He then earned a M.D. from Harvard Medical School and a Ph.D. in health policy from the Harvard Graduate School of Arts and Sciences in 2008, having initially begun within the Master of Public Policy program for health policy at the Harvard Kennedy School from 2003 to 2004. His dissertation was titled, "Cost-Effectiveness of 64-Slice Computed Tomography in Cardiac Care and An Analysis of the Adoption and Diffusion of a New Technology".

After receiving his doctorates, Ladapo completed clinical training in internal medicine at Beth Israel Deaconess Medical Center, a teaching hospital of Harvard Medical School.

== Career ==
After Harvard, Ladapo worked at the NYU School of Medicine, Bellevue Hospital, and Tisch Hospital in New York City. He received tenure at the David Geffen School of Medicine at UCLA, where he was a researcher, seeing patients about one day per week.

=== COVID-19 pandemic and Florida surgeon generalship ===
Around early 2020, Ladapo began to write op-eds for The Wall Street Journal on the emerging COVID-19 pandemic, notwithstanding a lack of specialization in infectious diseases, and gained prominence as a skeptic of mainstream consensus on prevention and treatment. In these columns, Ladapo promoted unproven treatments, including hydroxychloroquine and ivermectin, questioned the safety of vaccines, and opposed lockdown and mask mandates deriving from his "experience in treating COVID-19 patients at University of California, Los Angeles." However, UCLA's staff scheduling roster did not have him assigned to treat any COVID-19 patients, and several of his colleagues said he had never treated any COVID-19 patients. Later that year, Ladapo signed the Great Barrington Declaration, which argued for reaching COVID-19 herd immunity by the fringe notion of "focused protection", where the less vulnerable people were allowed to be infected.

Ladapo's op-eds caught the interest of Florida Governor Ron DeSantis. On September 21, 2021, he was appointed the Surgeon General of the state, replacing Scott Rivkees, pending confirmation by the Florida Senate. Simultaneously, he was appointed an associate professor at the University of Florida Health in a fast-tracked hiring process initiated after the Board of Trustees chair — a DeSantis advisor — presented his resume before the UF Health president. Faculty members have since alleged that university administrators suppressed information about Ladapo's views on COVID-19 before the vote on his tenure.

On appointment, Ladapo said he would move Florida public health away from a fear-based and "senseless" over-focus on mandating vaccines and toward medical choice and a focus on total health and numerous interventions to achieve it. He repealed quarantine rules for schoolchildren exposed to COVID-19 as his first executive action. The following month, Ladapo refused to wear a mask while meeting State Senator Tina Polsky, who was set to undergo radiation therapy; he defended his actions on the ground that masking hindered effective communication. The Senate confirmed Ladapo on February 23, 2022; during background checks, his former UCLA supervisor refused a positive recommendation and said that Ladapo's "hands-off" approach towards tackling COVID-19 had not only distressed colleagues but also violated the Hippocratic Oath. In March 2022, Ladapo recommended that healthy children in Florida not be vaccinated against COVID-19; thus, Florida became the first state to contradict relevant guidelines by the CDC and the American Academy of Pediatrics. Experts cited by Ladapo disagreed with his stance and accused him of cherry-picking their work.

In October 2022, Ladapo cited an anonymous non-peer-reviewed analysis—claiming high cases of cardiac-related deaths among men who took mRNA COVID-19 vaccines—to suggest that men aged 18 to 39 not be vaccinated. Medical professionals rejected his analysis as methodologically flawed and unscientific; David Gorski stated that it was the first time in American history that a "state government weaponized bad science to spread anti-vaccine disinformation as official policy." In January 2023, the Faculty Council of the University of Florida College of Medicine concluded upon an investigation that Ladapo's recommendation was based on "careless and contentious research practice" and might have violated the university policies on research integrity. An April 2023 article in Politico mentioned that an anonymous complainant accused Ladapo of altering a study on COVID vaccines conducted by the state by replacing language suggesting the vaccines posed no significant risks for young men with the aforementioned language suggesting men 18-39 not be vaccinated. The Florida attorney general later closed the investigation when the complainant did not respond to requests for further information.

Starting in 2023 Ladapo changed the states medical marijuana program to a rolling 35 day total limit versus the limit being monthly allotment.

On March 10, 2023, Ladapo was publicly rebuked by the CDC and FDA for disseminating vaccine misinformation in response to a letter he wrote to the agencies that had misinterpreted data from the Vaccine Adverse Event Reporting System (VAERS).

In September 2025, Ladapo announced that Florida would end all vaccine mandates, including those for children in schools, comparing the practice to slavery.

==== 2024 U.S. measles outbreak ====
In a letter to parents amid a 2024 measles outbreak at a Fort Lauderdale-area school, Ladapo acknowledged the "normal" recommendation that unvaccinated children stay home, but stated his department was "deferring to parents or guardians to make decisions about school attendance." Ladapo's advice contradicts CDC guidance, which suggests that anyone not previously infected with measles or immunized against the disease observe a 21-day quarantine. Katelyn Jetelina and Kristen Panthagani, writing for Scientific American, referred to Ladapo's advice that children without immunization to measles could continue attending school after exposure as "unprecedented and dangerous". Leana Wen, in a column published by the Washington Post, characterized Ladapo's decision as "outrageous" due to the danger posed by measles.

==== Transgender health care ====
Since 2022, Ladapo has also focused on opposing transgender health care.

For transgender and nonbinary children and teenagers, he opposes gender-affirming care and counseling, hormonal therapies, related medications, and social-transition tools such as pronoun and name changes. On April 20, a Florida Health news release quoted him as saying that people under 18 should not be "pushed" into gender transition and that the government should not be "injecting political ideology into the health of our children." On June 2, he accused professional organizations such as the American Academy of Pediatrics and the Endocrine Society of "follow[ing] a preferred political ideology instead of the highest level of generally accepted medical science."

He has also opposed gender-affirming care for adults. Early indications of this position were in the April 20, 2022 news release, which further claimed that the part of the brain "responsible for ... decision making) continu[es] to develop until approximately 25 years of age", and in Ladapo's June 2, 2022 letter, which quoted the Agency for Health Care Administration as saying there is "insufficient evidence that sex reassignment through medical interventions" is safe and in which Ladapo recommended developing "a standard of care for these complex and irreversible procedures." On May 17, 2023, Governor Ron DeSantis signed a law, "Treatments for Sex Reassignment" (often referred to as SB 254), which banned gender-affirming care from being covered by insurance, provided by nurse practitioners and physicians' assistants, or offered via telehealth. The bill bureaucratically forced a pause on all gender-affirming care for trans adults in Florida by requiring them to sign a nonexistent form. Ladapo, in his official capacity as Florida Surgeon General, was sued in Doe v. Ladapo, as a result of which the law was struck down in June 2024.

== Personal life ==
Ladapo is married to Brianna Ladapo, who identifies as a spiritual healer, and the two have three children.
