= Florida Department of Health =

State health agency of Florida

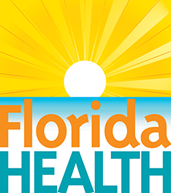

Department overview
- Preceding Department: Florida Department of Health and Rehabilitative Services
- Jurisdiction: Government of Florida
- Headquarters: Tallahassee, Florida; 30.39°N 84.23°W
- Department executive: Joseph Ladapo
- Website: www.flhealth.gov

The Florida Department of Health is responsible for protecting the public health and safety of the residents and visitors of the state of Florida. It is a cabinet-level agency of the state government, headed by a state surgeon general who reports to the governor. The department has its headquarters in Tallahassee.

== History ==
During the 1996 legislative session, the beleaguered Florida Department of Health and Rehabilitative Services was reconstructed as two entities: the Department of Health and the Florida Department of Children and Families.

The Florida Department of Health operates county health departments in all 67 of the state's counties. The agency employs more than 17,000 persons. It has worked on two-year-old immunizations, tobacco control, and statewide preparedness response efforts.

The Florida Department of Health is responsible for public health, including:

- Epidemiology
- Investigating foodborne illness and zoonotic and waterborne diseases
- Emergency preparedness and bioterrorism
- Controlling communicable disease
- Health promotion and education
- School health. The department manages the school health services program in cooperation with the Florida Department of Education. Funding comes from a variety of sources, including DOH and local school districts.
- Women's health
- Public health dentistry and oral health
- Nutrition
- Vaccinations/preventable disease
- Eliminating health disparities
- Provision of vital records
- Environmental health
- Medical Quality Assurance
- Epilepsy
- Chronic disease
- Spinal cord injury prevention programs

=== Florida Board of Dentistry ===
Established in 1990, the Florida Board of Dentistry (FLBOD) is the state regulatory agency responsible for licensing dentists and dental hygienists to ensure safe practice standards. The Board is composed of 11 members appointed by the governor of Florida and confirmed by the Florida Senate: seven licensed dentists, two dental hygienists, and two consumer members. The FLBOD oversees professional conduct, continuing education requirements, and sedation permits.

=== COVID-19 ===
On 15 February 2023, the department published a safety alert from the State Surgeon General Joseph Ladapo warning of “a novel increase” in adverse event reports related to mRNA-based COVID-19 vaccines. The federal Centers for Disease Control and Prevention (CDC) subsequently published a public response to Ladapo and the department, offering rebuttals to his "misinterpretations and misinformation" related to the Vaccine Adverse Event Reporting System.

On 10 May 2023, Ladapo issued an open letter to Food and Drug Administration Commissioner Robert Califf and CDC Director Rochelle Walensky accusing their agencies of withholding information regarding the true rate of adverse events associated with COVID-19 vaccines. Ladapo issued another letter on 6 December 2023, asking the FDA and CDC to address reports of "nucleic acid contaminants" discovered in samples of Pfizer–BioNTech and Moderna COVID-19 vaccines. The FDA dismissed his concerns as "misleading" and stated that the agency stood firm in its regulatory decision making. On 3 January 2024, Ladapo called for a statewide halt of the use of mRNA COVID-19 vaccines.
