= Political positions of Ron DeSantis =

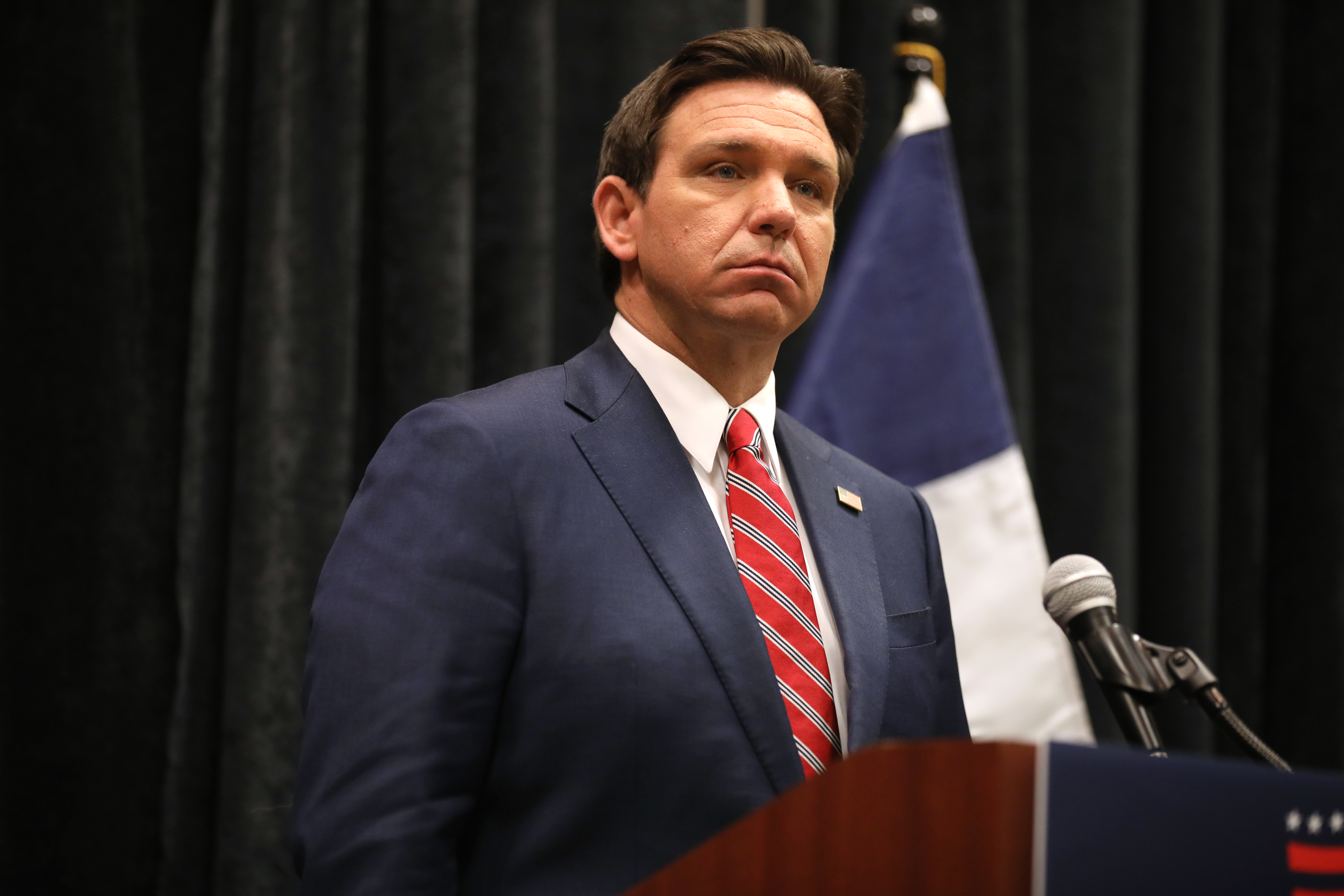
DeSantis speaking at a 2024 press conference in West Des Moines, Iowa

The political positions of Ron DeSantis have been recorded from his 2012 election to the United States House of Representatives and his tenure as representative, the 2016 United States Senate election in Florida, and during his tenure as governor of Florida. DeSantis is considered a conservative Republican.

== Foreign relations ==
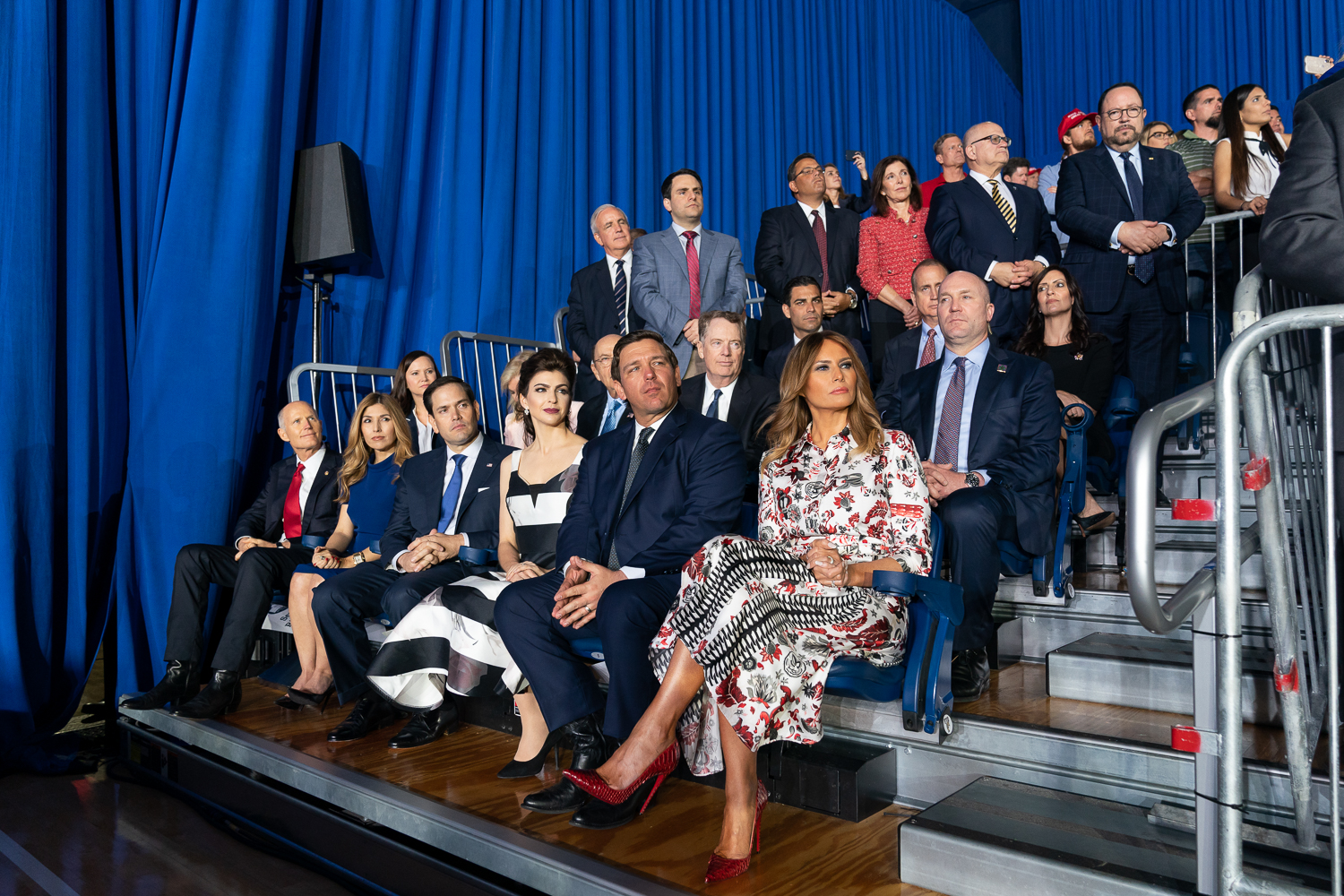
DeSantis watches as President Donald Trump delivers remarks to the Venezuelan American community in February 2019.

He has described himself as a follower of the "Reagan school" in foreign policy. During his three terms serving in the US House, he was a member of the United States House Committee on Foreign Affairs.

=== Afghanistan ===
DeSantis condemned the U.S. military pullout from Afghanistan in 2021, saying it was poorly planned. He placed much of the blame on President Biden and accused him of making the country vulnerable to exploitation by China, Russia, North Korea and other geopolitical rivals of the United States. "After 9/11, we needed to go in and rout the Taliban and al-Qaida. But I think in hindsight, we should have come home after that. I think trying to do the democracy and all that, I think has been very problematic", DeSantis said. He also condemned the 2021 Kabul airport attack that killed 13 American soldiers. The governor's office sent an email to U.S. secretary of defense Lloyd Austin, Secretary of State Antony Blinken and Secretary of Homeland Security Alejandro Mayorkas on August 30, 2021, asking which Afghan refugees would be coming to Florida and the fates of those Floridians who were still in Afghanistan.

=== Australia ===
DeSantis supports the Quadrilateral Security Dialogue (the "Quad") between Australia, India, Japan and the United States, having called it a "good framework".

=== Bahamas ===
After Hurricane Dorian struck The Bahamas, DeSantis told reporters that the U.S. federal government, not Florida, should bear responsibility for hurricane assistance. He encouraged donations to those affected by the hurricane through the Volunteer Florida website and urged Floridians not to cancel vacations to the country's less-affected islands. DeSantis took an aerial tour of The Bahamas with the state's two U.S. senators, Marco Rubio and Rick Scott, on September 6, 2019. After the tour, he said the Coast Guard was "doing a great job". When asked on September 9, 2019, if he would lobby President Trump to support Rubio's and Scott's request to either waive or suspend visa requirements to allow Bahamians to temporarily live with families in the U.S., he said he did not support that idea.

=== China ===
Ron DeSantis regards China as a "hostile country", and he came up with many policies to contain Chinese influence. For example, DeSantis signed legislation banning Confucius Institutes (cultural centers funded by the Chinese government) from Florida's public universities. He also signed a law increasing penalties for corporate espionage conducted on behalf of foreign entities. DeSantis also stated that Chinese investors making a large amount of real estate investments in the state is not in Florida's best interest.

=== Cuba ===
DeSantis introduced the Guantanamo Bay Recidivism Prevention Act, which would end foreign aid to countries that receive detainees if they reappear on the terrorism recidivism list, in 2015.

DeSantis opposed President Obama's plan to shut down the Guantanamo Bay detention camp, saying, "Bringing hardened terrorists to the U.S. homeland harms our national security."

Regarding the formal restart of diplomatic relations between the U.S. and Cuba, DeSantis said, "Raising the Cuban flag in the United States is a slap in the face to those who have experienced the brutality of the Castro regime."

On July 15, 2021, during the Cuban protests, DeSantis called for the Cuban military to stage a coup in Cuba. He also urges the Biden administration to "restore internet access to Cuba".

=== Iran ===
DeSantis opposed the Iran nuclear deal framework, calling it "a bad deal that will significantly degrade our national security". He added, "the Iran deal gives Ayatollah Khamenei exactly what he wants: billions of dollars in sanctions relief, validation of the Iranian nuclear program, and the ability to stymie inspections."

During a line of questioning, DeSantis told Secretary of State John Kerry that the executive branch had a legal obligation to provide Congress with the details behind any side deals made between world leaders and Iran. He accused Obama of treating Cuba's Raúl Castro and Iran's ayatollah Ali Khamenei better than Israel's Benjamin Netanyahu.

=== Israel ===
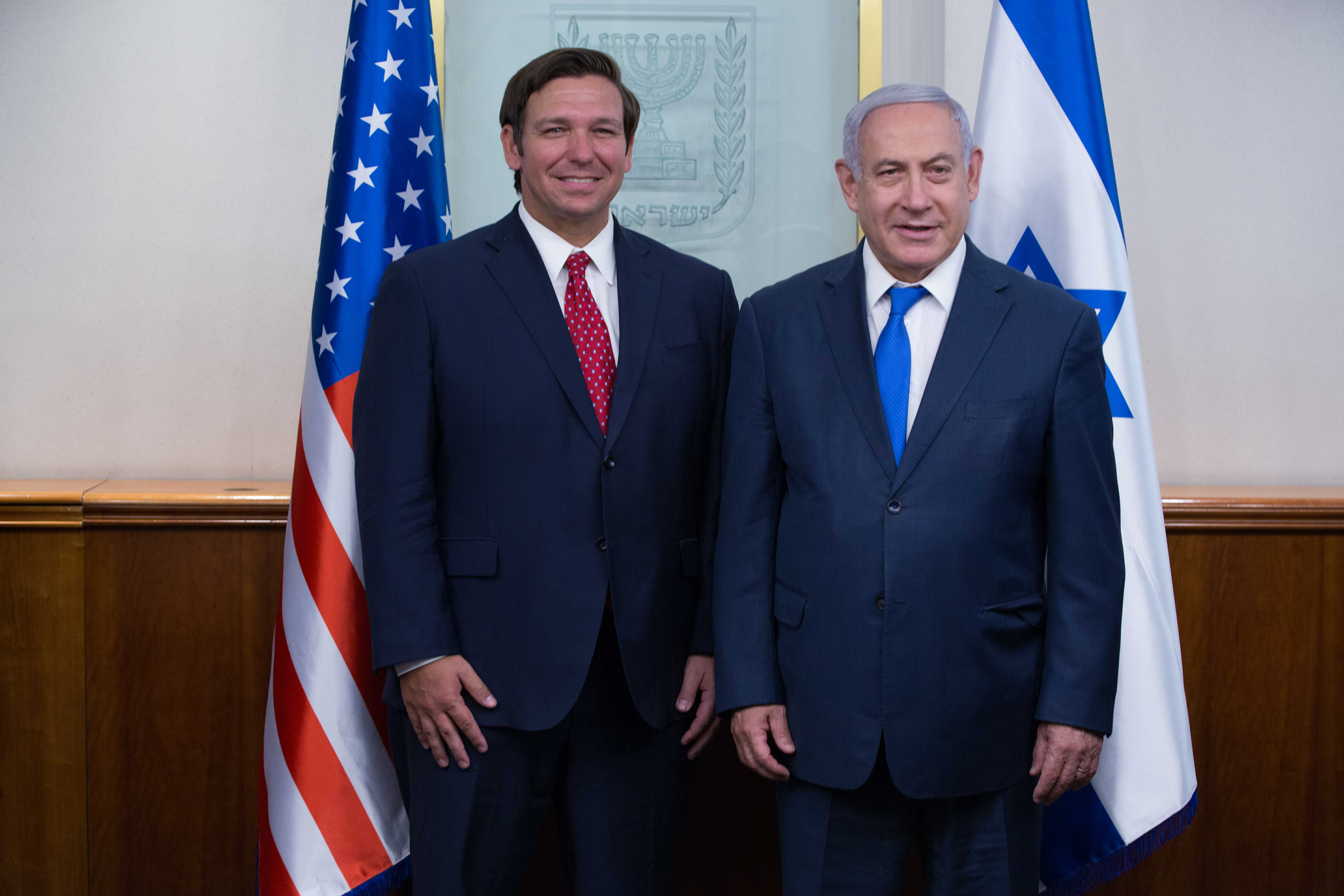
DeSantis with Israeli prime minister Benjamin Netanyahu in May 2019

DeSantis co-introduced the Non-Discrimination of Israel in Labeling Act, which would defend the right of Israeli producers to label products manufactured in the West Bank as "Israeli", "Made in Israel," or "Product of Israel", in 2016. He supported the relocation of the U.S. Embassy from Tel Aviv to Jerusalem.

As governor, DeSantis pledged to be "the most pro-Israel governor in America". In light of Airbnb's decision to no longer allow rentals of Israeli settlements in the West Bank, on January 15, 2019, DeSantis directed the Department of Management Services to no longer reimburse state employees and state contractors for travel expenses incurred with Airbnb; later that month he accepted the State Board of Administration's recommendation to place Airbnb on Florida's "Scrutinized Companies List". DeSantis visited Israel – accompanied by Sheldon Adelson, a megadonor to his 2018 gubernatorial campaign – in May to attend a ceremony held by Florida Atlantic University and Ariel University, celebrating the agreement of a plan to exchange and research opportunities between the universities' respective students.

=== Russia and Ukraine ===
==== Russian invasion of Ukraine ====
In 2014 and 2015 he supported sending weapons to Ukraine to counter Russia, and reproached President Obama, saying he had no effective strategy in the face of Putin's aggression on Eastern European countries. In 2023, he questioned US involvement in Crimea or the borderlands of Ukraine, and described Russian military action against NATO countries as not imminent. At the same time, he reiterated criticism that the Obama administration did not deliver lethal weapons to Ukraine at the time and thus the U.S. did not show strength against Russia.

DeSantis denounced the 2022 Russian invasion of Ukraine and praised the Ukrainian resistance. On March 1, he said that President Biden was going too easy on Russia, and that Biden should apply sanctions to the Russian oil industry.

In a February 20, 2023 appearance on Fox & Friends, DeSantis said he thought the Biden administration had a blank check policy regarding its support toward Ukraine and that Russia has not come close to attacking NATO countries. He called on the Biden administration to articulate a clear strategic objective and not to pursue a policy of open-ended funding for Ukraine. Also during the interview he criticized President Joe Biden for visiting Ukraine without doing "anything to secure our own border here at home", and said he thought Russia was hostile but that China was a larger threat. DeSantis has also expressed support in the belief that Putin would refrain from other invasions, particularly into NATO countries; his comments notably contrasted from Mike Pence, who took a more hawkish view onto Ukraine and believed that Putin would attack other countries regardless of their membership in NATO.

After the International Criminal Court issued an arrest warrant for Putin and Maria Lvova-Belova, DeSantis mirrored the ICC in deeming Putin a war criminal. DeSantis clarified that his prior statements were not meant to excuse Russia or reduce U.S. involvement but rather to oppose more involvement and to oppose American troops in the Ukraine conflict, and he said the world should hold Putin accountable.

==== Russia investigation ====
According to the Tampa Bay Times, DeSantis "made a name for himself [in 2017] attacking special counsel Robert Mueller's investigation into Russian meddling in the 2016 election".

DeSantis proposed an amendment that would halt funding for Mueller's 2017 Special Counsel investigation probe six months after the amendment's passage. In addition, the provision would prohibit Mueller from investigating matters that occurred before June 2015, when Trump launched his presidential campaign. In December 2017, DeSantis asserted that if there were any evidence of collusion between members of the Trump campaign and Russian officials, it would already have been leaked.

In January 2018, while on the House Intelligence Committee, DeSantis voted, along with every other Republican on the committee, to release a classified memo authored by Republicans on the committee which purported to show that the FBI abused its surveillance powers in the Russia investigation. He voted not to release a memo authored by Democrats on the committee that accused Republicans on the committee of playing politics with national security. Democrats described the Republican-authored memo as grossly distorted and intended to discredit Mueller's investigation, and said that the Republicans on the committee had begun an investigation into the FBI and Department of Justice.

In April 2018, DeSantis called on FBI director Christopher Wray to criminally investigate a number of officials involved in investigating Russian interference in the 2016 election, including former FBI director James Comey, former acting director of the FBI Andrew McCabe, FBI agent Peter Strzok and FBI counsel Lisa Page. He also called for investigations of a number of former Obama administration officials, including Loretta Lynch and Hillary Clinton.

On October 10, 2019, a spokesman for DeSantis announced that DeSantis would return a political contribution from two Soviet-born businessmen, Lev Parnas and Igor Fruman, through their company Global Energy Producers. Parnas and Fruman are accused of funneling foreign cash into U.S. elections to increase their influence and promote their business interests; they are central figures in the Trump-Ukraine scandal and impeachment inquiry. They made the donation a day before Trump tweeted his "full endorsement" of DeSantis.

=== Syria ===
In 2013, DeSantis opposed President Obama's proposals to use military force in the Syrian civil war. Discussing Syria in 2014, DeSantis said he disagreed with the idea that "Americans are war weary". DeSantis opposed the temporary amnesty for Syrian refugees. DeSantis argued against arming Syrian rebels against President Bashar Assad.

=== United Kingdom ===
In 2023, DeSantis called himself a supporter of Brexit. With Secretary of State for Business and Trade Kemi Badenoch he discussed the prospect of a state-level economic Memorandum of Understanding between the U.K. and Florida.

== Domestic policy ==
=== Abortion and contraceptives ===
DeSantis opposes abortion and has denounced Planned Parenthood. He has supported restrictions on abortion and on April 14, 2022, DeSantis signed into law a bill that regulated elective abortion after 15 weeks of pregnancy, limiting the period of viability to 24 weeks and later. In 2023, he signed a bill that banned abortion after six weeks of pregnancy. The bill has an exception to save the life of the woman and exceptions in the case of pregnancy caused by rape or incest until 15 weeks of pregnancy.

DeSantis agreed with the U.S. Supreme Court's decision in Burwell v. Hobby Lobby Stores, Inc., saying, "This case does not concern the availability or legality of contraceptives, and individuals can obtain and use these as they see fit. The question is simply whether the government can force the owners of Hobby Lobby to pay for abortifacients in violation of their faith."

=== Cannabis ===
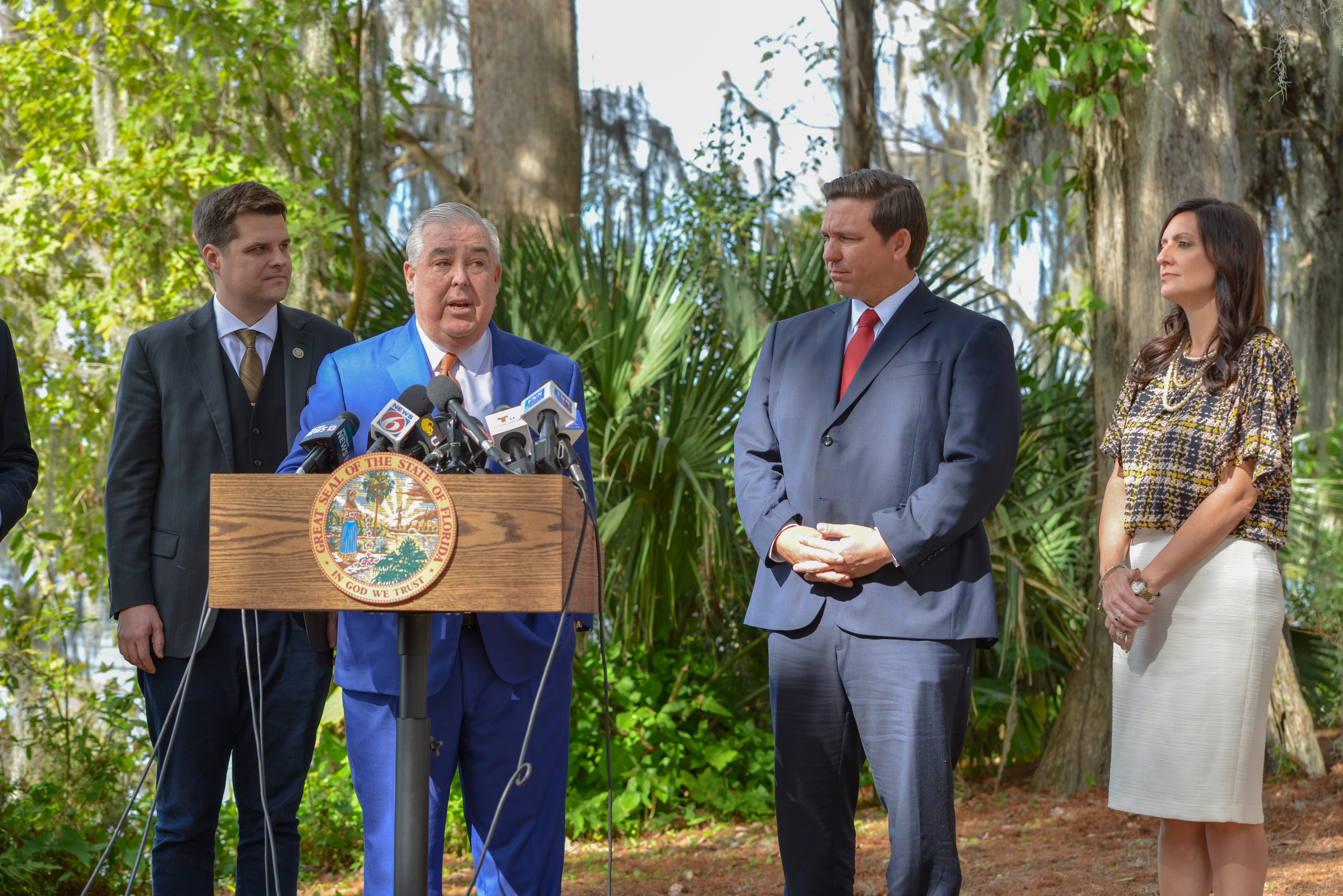
DeSantis with attorney John Morgan, in Winter Park, Florida, announcing the legalization of medical marijuana in Florida, 2019

DeSantis supports the implementation of a medical marijuana program in Florida, but opposes legalizing recreational marijuana. In a June 2019 interview, he said that recreational marijuana legalization will not become law "while I'm governor." He voted against the Veterans Equal Access Amendment, which would give veterans access to medical cannabis if recommended by their Veterans Health Administration doctor and if it is legal for medicinal purposes in their state.

DeSantis and Representative Matt Gaetz held a press conference with John Morgan, a prominent medical cannabis advocate and former Democrat, in early 2019 to persuade the Florida legislature to lift a ban on smokable medical cannabis. According to sources involved, it was orchestrated by Gaetz, whom DeSantis trusted.

=== COVID-19 lockdowns and vaccine mandates ===
During the COVID-19 pandemic in Florida, DeSantis resisted imposing restrictions including face mask mandates, stay-at-home orders, and vaccination requirements. In May 2021, he signed into law a bill that prohibited businesses, schools, cruise ships, and government entities from requiring proof of vaccination.

=== Death penalty ===
DeSantis supports the death penalty. In 2022, he said that the Stoneman Douglas High School shooting perpetrator Nikolas Cruz deserved the death penalty after Cruz instead received 34 consecutive life sentences without the possibility of parole.

In 2023, DeSantis supported moves to end jury unanimity for death penalty cases. In April 2023, DeSantis signed a bill that ended jury unanimity for death penalty cases.

DeSantis also supported a bill to have the death penalty for child rapists. In current federal jurisdiction, the death penalty is prohibited for non-fatal crimes under Kennedy v. Louisiana. In May 2023, DeSantis signed the bill, which has been speculated to serve as a future challenge to Kennedy.

=== Disaster relief ===
In January 2013, after DeSantis had just been sworn into the House of Representatives, he voted against providing federal disaster relief for Hurricane Sandy to the impacted states of New York and New Jersey. DeSantis stated his rationale as being that increasing federal "debt by another $9.7 billion with no plan to offset the spending with cuts elsewhere is not fiscally responsible", criticizing a "put it on the credit card mentality".

In September 2022, as governor of Florida, DeSantis requested for federal disaster relief for Florida due to the impact of Hurricane Ian, arguing that in spite of living "in a very politicized time ... when people are fighting for their lives, when their whole livelihood is at stake, when they've lost everything — if you can't put politics aside for that, then you're just not going to be able to."

=== Economy ===
DeSantis has said that the debate over how to reduce the federal deficit should shift emphasis from tax increases to curtailing spending and triggering economic growth. He supports a "no budget no pay" policy for Congress to encourage the passage of a budget. He believes the Federal Reserve System should be audited.

In the wake of the alleged IRS targeting controversy, DeSantis called for IRS commissioner John Koskinen's resignation for having "failed the American people by frustrating Congress's attempts to ascertain the truth". He co-sponsored a bill to impeach Koskinen for violating the public's trust. Citizens Against Government Waste, a conservative think tank, named DeSantis a "Taxpayer Superhero" in 2015.

DeSantis supported the Regulations from the Executive in Need of Scrutiny (REINS) Act, which would require that regulations that have a significant economic impact be subject to a vote of Congress prior to taking effect.

DeSantis sponsored the Transportation Empowerment Act, which would transfer much of the responsibility for transportation projects to the states and sharply reduce the federal gas tax.

DeSantis has opposed legislation to require online retailers to collect and pay state sales tax.

DeSantis voted for the Tax Cuts and Jobs Act of 2017. He said the bill would bring a "dramatically lower tax rate", "full expensing of capital investments", and more jobs to America.

During his 2018 gubernatorial campaign, DeSantis pledged to lower corporate income taxes to 5% or lower. During his tenure, corporate income taxes in Florida got as low as 3.5% in 2021, but by 2022 they had increased to 5.5%. DeSantis has maintained Florida's low-tax status during his time as governor.

In June 2019, DeSantis signed a $91.1 billion budget the legislature passed the previous month, which was the largest in state history at the time, though he cut $131 million in appropriations. In June 2021, he signed a $101.5 billion budget that included $169 million in tax relief.

Throughout most of 2019, Florida's unemployment rate hovered below 5%. During the COVID-19 lockdown in early to mid-2020, Florida, and most other states, saw unemployment rates near 15%. DeSantis partially blamed his gubernatorial predecessor, Rick Scott, for leaving behind a dejected unemployment system that created backlogs as COVID-19 damaged the state economy. Afterward, Florida's economy swiftly started recovering, and the unemployment rate fell below 7% by the latter half of 2020. Since May 2022, Florida's unemployment rate has sat around 2%, below the national average.

As a result of a significant increase in gas prices, DeSantis would announce on November 22, 2021, that he would be temporarily waiving the state's gas tax in the next legislative session in 2022.

In June 2023, DeSantis banned most vehicle manufacturers (except Tesla) from selling vehicles directly to consumers in Florida, thus guaranteeing that franchised dealerships would remain as part of the sales process.

=== Education ===
DeSantis opposes federal education programs such as No Child Left Behind Act and Race to the Top, saying that education policy should be made at the local level.

DeSantis introduced the Higher Education Reform and Opportunity Act, which would allow states to create their own accreditation systems, in 2016. In an op-ed for National Review, he said his legislation would give students "access to federal loan money to put towards non-traditional educational opportunities, such as online learning courses, vocational schools, and apprenticeships in skilled trades".

In June 2021, DeSantis led an effort to ban the teaching of critical race theory in Florida public schools (though it had not been a part of Florida public school curriculum). He described critical race theory as "teaching kids to hate their country", mirroring a similar push by conservatives nationally. The Florida Board of Education approved the ban on June 10. The Florida Education Association criticized the ban, accusing the Board of trying to hide facts from students. Other critics claimed the ban was an effort to "politicize classroom education and whitewash American history".

On December 15, 2021, DeSantis announced a new bill, the Stop Wrongs to Our Kids and Employees (WOKE) Act, which would allow parents to sue school districts that teach their children critical race theory. The bill is designed to combat "woke indoctrination" in Florida businesses and schools by preventing instruction that could make some people feel that they bear "personal responsibility" for historic wrongdoings because of their race, gender or national origin, preventing instruction that teaches that individuals are "inherently racist, sexist, or oppressive, whether consciously or unconsciously.", and preventing instruction that teaches that groups of people are oppressed or privileged based on their race, gender or national origin. He said of the bill: "No taxpayer dollars should be used to teach our kids to hate our country or hate each other." On August 18, 2022, a Florida judge blocked the act, saying that it violates the First Amendment and is too vague.

DeSantis signed three education bills into law on June 22, 2021, and suggested that state colleges and universities could lose funding if they were found to promote "stale ideology" and "indoctrination". He offered no specific examples of students being indoctrinated by Florida higher education institutions. House Bill 233 requires institutions to annually "assess the intellectual freedom and viewpoint diversity at that institution using a survey adopted by the State Board of Education", while House Bill 5 and Senate Bill 1108 introduce new requirements for civics education, including lessons on the "evil of communist and totalitarian regimes". Critics of the laws, including the Florida Education Association, claim they will have a "chilling effect on intellectual and academic freedom" and that the bills were designed to intimidate educators and suppress the free exchange of ideas.

DeSantis announced that Florida would replace the Florida Standards Assessment (FSA) test with a system of smaller tests scattered throughout the year on September 14, 2021. He said the replacement would be three tests for the fall, winter and spring, each smaller than the FSA. Florida Commissioner of Education Richard Corcoran agreed with the decision, calling it a "huge victory for the school system". The new system is to be implemented by the 2022–2023 school year. DeSantis signed a bill (SB 1048) ending the FSA testing on March 15, 2022. The new bill mandates a "progress monitoring system" that tests students three times a year, at the beginning, middle and end of each school year. The Florida Education Association criticized the bill, saying it failed to reduce the standardized testing done on students or "eliminate the big make-or-break test at the end of year." Corcoran praised the bill, saying the monitoring caters to students, gives teachers more easily available data, and is "much more helpful to parents, and most importantly, it's beneficial to students".

On March 22, 2022, DeSantis signed into law bill SB 1054, which requires students entering high school starting in the 2023–2024 school year to take a financial literacy course. Florida is the largest U.S. state to mandate a financial literacy course.

The Florida Parental Rights in Education Act, a bill which prohibits the instruction of gender identity and otherwise "sexual" issues up until the third grade, was introduced by DeSantis supporters Joe Harding and Dennis Baxley, and was signed into law on March 27, 2022; it became effective July 1 of that year. The bill became subject to protests and student walkouts, receiving condemnation from various organizations as well as the United Nations OHCHR and the US federal government for being seen as targeted against the LGBT community. The law received the nickname Don't Say Gay Bill prior to its passage, and the Don't Say Gay Act or Don't Say Gay Law after it. In 2023, DeSantis supported Senate Bill 1320, which is an expansion to the Florida Parental Rights in Education Act. This bill would prohibit teaching about sexual orientation or gender identity from pre-kindergarten through the eighth grade (Higher than the third grade of 2022 bill). DeSantis has made comments supporting the bill, signaling that if it passes the legislature, he will likely sign it.

On May 9, 2022, DeSantis signed House Bill 395, mandating that schools observe Victims of Communism Day (which is held on November 7, the same day as the traditional Soviet October Revolution Day) by devoting 45 minutes to teaching about communism, the role of Karl Marx, Friedrich Engles, Vladimir Lenin, Joseph Stalin, Mao Zedong, Fidel Castro, and other communist leaders in history, and "how people suffered under those regimes".

On February 14, 2023, DeSantis suggested that an organization other than the College Board should run Florida's AP classes.

DeSantis also supported and continues to support Florida House Bill 999, pending Florida legislation which would restrict and prohibit diversity, equity, and inclusion in state universities. The bill further raises the power of university board and presidents, and blocks school funds from being used in diversity, equity and inclusion programs run by faculty. Likewise to the Parental Rights in Education Act, DeSantis' proposed restrictions have become subject to numerous protests by students.

=== Entitlements ===
As a congressman in 2015, DeSantis introduced the Let Seniors Work Act, which would have repealed the Retirement Earnings Test and exempted senior citizens from the 12.4% Social Security payroll tax. He also co-sponsored a measure to eliminate taxes on Social Security benefits.

In 2013, then-congressman DeSantis voted for a non-binding resolution that urged raising the age to qualify for Social Security to 70; this was a symbolic statement of a policy preference, and therefore would not have become law if it had passed.

=== Environment ===
DeSantis has called himself a "Teddy Roosevelt conservationist". During his 2018 gubernatorial run, he said that he did not deny climate change's existence, but did not want to be labeled a "climate change believer", adding, "I think we contribute to changes in the environment, but I'm not in the pews of the global warming left."

In 2019, DeSantis signed an executive order that included a variety of components relating to the environment. These included a promise to spend $2.5 billion over four years on restoring the Everglades and "other water protection", and the creation of a Blue-Green Algae Task Force, an Office of Environmental Accountability and Transparency, and a Chief Science Officer.

DeSantis supported the successful 2018 ballot initiative that amended the Constitution of Florida to ban offshore drilling, and encouraged the Florida legislature and Department of Environmental Protection to work towards banning fracking in Florida. On July 10, 2020, he announced that Florida would spend $8.6 million out of $166 million received by the state from a legal settlement between Volkswagen and the United States Department of Justice relating to emission violations to add 34 charging stations for electric cars. The stations would be along Interstates 4, 75, 95, 275 and 295. On June 16, 2021, DeSantis signed into law House Bill 839, which bans local governments in Florida from requiring gas stations to add electric car charging stations.

DeSantis called climate change "left-wing stuff". In 2023, the state of Florida under DeSantis approved a public school curriculum including videos produced by conservative advocacy group PragerU, likening climate change skeptics to those who fought Communism and Nazism, implying renewable energy harms the environment, and saying current global warming occurs naturally.

=== Gun law ===
DeSantis opposes gun control. He received an A+ rating from the NRA Political Victory Fund. He generally opposes firearm regulation, saying, "Very rarely do firearms restrictions affect criminals. They really only affect law-abiding citizens."

After the 2018 Stoneman Douglas High School shooting in Parkland, Florida, DeSantis expressed his support for hiring retired law enforcement officers and military veterans as armed guards for schools. He disagrees with legislation Governor Rick Scott signed that banned bump stocks, added a mandatory three-day waiting period for gun purchases, and raised the legal age for purchases from 18 to 21. He has expressed support for measures to improve federal background checks for purchasing firearms and has said that there is a need to intervene with those who are exhibiting warning signs of committing violence instead of waiting until a crime has been committed.

In November 2020, DeSantis proposed an "anti-mob" extension to the preexisting stand-your-ground law in Florida that would allow gun-owning residents to use deadly force on individuals they believe are looting. It would also make blocking traffic during a protest a third-degree felony and impose criminal penalties for partaking in "violent or disorderly assemblies".

=== Health care ===
As of 2013, DeSantis opposed the Patient Protection and Affordable Care Act. He has called for its "full and complete repeal".

DeSantis said he was not ready to support the American Health Care Act, the House Republican effort to repeal and replace the Affordable Care Act, in March 2017. He did vote for the May 2017 Republican effort to repeal and replace the Affordable Care Act.

=== Immigration ===
DeSantis was a critic of Obama's immigration policies; he opposed Deferred Action for Childhood Arrivals (DACA) and Deferred Action for Parents of Americans (DAPA) and accused Obama of failing to enforce immigration laws. DeSantis has sought to ban "sanctuary cities". He is a co-sponsor of the Establishing Mandatory Minimums for Illegal Reentry Act of 2015, also known as Kate's Law, which would amend the Immigration and Nationality Act to increase penalties applicable to aliens who unlawfully reenter the United States after being removed. DeSantis spoke at ACT! for America, an anti-Muslim advocacy group designated as a hate group by the Southern Poverty Law Center and the Center for American Progress, in 2017.

After the November 2015 Paris attacks, DeSantis "called for urgent recognition that Islamic extremism is to blame for the Paris attacks and should be seen as an enemy for America". He has said, "The enemy is an ideology rooted in militant Islam" and that ISIS must be stopped and its members kept away from America. Of U.S. policy toward refugees, DeSantis said, "the prudent policy is to err on the side of protecting the American people".

DeSantis encouraged Florida sheriffs to cooperate with the federal government on immigration-related issues. In June 2019, he signed an anti-"sanctuary city" bill in law; the legislation required law enforcement "to honor U.S. Immigration and Customs Enforcement detainers for undocumented immigrants who are arrested or convicted" of crimes. There were no sanctuary cities in Florida before the law's enactment, and immigration advocates called the bill politically motivated. Florida became the 12th state to adopt legislation requiring local governments to aid federal immigration-enforcement efforts. In June 2020, DeSantis signed a bill requiring government employers and private companies that contract with the government to use E-Verify. He had originally called for all employers to be required to use it.

DeSantis' administration destined $12 million for relocating migrants to other states, and by 2022 he considered busing undocumented immigrants to Joe Biden's home state, Delaware, for almost a year. However, on September 7, 2022, he stated that neither Cubans nor Venezuelans would be sent out of the state. On September 15, DeSantis sent two charter planes with undocumented immigrants (mostly Venezuelans, at least 50) to Martha's Vineyard, Massachusetts. Attorneys representing them declared that they were lied to, being promised jobs and housing. The air carrier was paid $615,000 on September 8 for the transport, and received another $980,000 less than two weeks later. The destination community was not notified of the refugees' impending arrival and requirements.

In 2025, DeSantis supported Alligator Alcatraz.

=== Law enforcement ===
DeSantis opposes efforts to defund the police, and as governor has introduced initiatives to "fund the police". In September 2021, DeSantis introduced a $5,000 signing bonus for Florida police officers in a bid to attract additional out-of-state police recruits.

=== LGBT issues ===
DeSantis has a "0" rating from the Human Rights Campaign for his voting record on LGBT-related issues and legislation. In 2018, he told the Sun-Sentinel that he "doesn't want any discrimination in Florida, I want people to be able to live their life, whether you're gay or whether you're religious." Throughout his political career, DeSantis has opposed bills and judicial rulings upholding the legitimacy of same-sex marriage, and his political campaign has refused to clarify his position on the subject.

In January 2019, less than a week after taking office, DeSantis issued a non-discrimination order for state employees reiterating former governor Scott's order; the order included race, age, sex, color, religion, national origin, marital status, and disability, but had no protections for sexual orientation or gender identity. Scott had pledged to sign an LGBT-inclusive order as governor, but did not follow through on the grounds that proper federal protections existed.

In June 2019, DeSantis's office issued a proclamation honoring the victims of the Orlando nightclub shooting at the Pulse nightclub, a gay bar where 49 people were killed and 50 others were injured on June 12, 2016. The proclamation did not include any reference to the LGBT community, sparking criticism and accusations that DeSantis may have intentionally omitted it from the message. DeSantis later reissued the proclamation with revisions including mentions of the LGBT community, and a spokesperson said the earlier omission was an error by DeSantis's staff. Two years later, he vetoed mental health funding for the shooting's survivors from the state budget. The vetoed funds for those Orlando organizations would have helped make up for termination of federal grant money, and those vetoed funds were .06% of the total vetoed funds statewide.

On June 1, 2021, DeSantis signed the Fairness in Women's Sports Act (SB 1028). It bans transgender girls and women from participating and competing in middle-school and high-school girls' and college women's sports competitions in Florida. The law took effect on July 1.

In February 2022, DeSantis voiced his support for the Florida Parental Rights in Education Act, often called the "Don't Say Gay" law by its opponents, which would prohibit instruction on sexual orientation or gender identity in school classrooms from kindergarten to grade 3. He said it was "entirely inappropriate" for teachers and school administrators to talk to students about their gender identity. DeSantis signed the bill into law on March 28, 2022, and it took effect on July 1. This statute also includes a provision "requiring school district personnel to encourage a student to discuss issues relating to his or her well-being with his or her parent or to facilitate discussion of the issue with the parent".

In response to The Walt Disney Company's opposition to the bill, and amid an ongoing feud between DeSantis and Disney, DeSantis suggested that the Florida legislature revoke Disney World's special self-governing privileges over its 25,000-acre (10,000-hectare) property—privileges granted to the company in 1967. On April 22, 2022, he signed a bill to dissolve the Reedy Creek Improvement Act, which allows Disney to self-govern its district, by June 2023.

In March 2022, DeSantis signed a proclamation stating that runner-up Emma Weyant was the "rightful winner" of the women's 500-yard freestyle NCAA Division I championship, after the race had been won by Lia Thomas, a trans woman. DeSantis criticized the NCAA for allowing trans women to compete in women's events. The proclamation was a symbolic one, as governors do not have the power to alter the results of college sporting events.

In April 2022, DeSantis's Department of Health released new official guidance advising that neither social transition (reported by NBC as "pronouns, hair and dress in accordance with their gender identities") nor medical transition or puberty blockers be allowed for transgender teenagers.

In April 2023, social media influencer Dylan Mulvaney, who is transgender, published a video sponsored by the Bud Light beer brand, which featured a can of beer commemorating a milestone in her gender transition. Later that month, DeSantis responded by blaming a trend of "woke companies" that were "trying to change our country", stating that "pushback is in order across the board including with Bud Light", and indicating that a conservative boycott of Bud Light would be effective. Later in June 2023, DeSantis said at an event that he would "serve you anything except Bud Light. I just can't do that." By July 2023, after a boycott from conservatives and others, Bud Light's sales fell by 24% compared to the previous year, and Bud Light's parent company AB InBev's shares had fallen to $58 per share, despite being at $66 in March 2023. With Florida's pension fund holding over 680,000 shares in AB InBev, DeSantis in July 2023 called for AB InBev to be investigated by Florida's pension fund agency for breaching duties to shareholders, as "there's got to be penalties when you put business aside to focus on your social agenda at the expense of hardworking people", despite supporting the boycott that caused the fall in shares himself.

In June 2022, DeSantis's Department of Health ordered gender-affirming health care banned for Medicaid recipients of all ages and issued a request to the state medical board that it be banned for transgender youth regardless of Medicaid status.

=== Pardon power ===
Following the federal indictment of Donald Trump in June 2023, DeSantis tweeted criticism of the indictment and promised to "bring accountability to the DOJ, excise political bias and end weaponization once and for all", but did not say whether or not he would offer to give Trump a presidential pardon if elected, as fellow candidate Vivek Ramaswamy had done. Several weeks later, DeSantis offered this: "I'm going to do what's right for the country. I don't think it would be good for the country to have an almost 80-year-old former president go to prison. It doesn't seem like it would be a good thing". DeSantis also believes that Trump "of course" lost the 2020 election.

=== Technology companies ===
In response to social media networks removing Trump from their platforms, DeSantis and other Florida Republicans pushed legislation in the Florida Legislature to prohibit technology companies from de-platforming political candidates. A federal judge blocked the law by preliminary injunction the day before it was to take effect, on the grounds that it violated the First Amendment and federal law.

=== Term limits and pensions ===
DeSantis opted not to receive his congressional pension, and filed a measure that would eliminate pensions for members of Congress. After introducing the End Pensions in Congress Act, DeSantis said, "The Founding Fathers envisioned elected officials as part of a servant class, yet Washington has evolved into a ruling class culture."

DeSantis supports a constitutional amendment to impose term limits on members of Congress, so that U.S. representatives would be limited to three terms and senators to two. As of 2022, he has served three terms as a U.S. representative.

=== Transportation ===
In December 2022, DeSantis signed a bipartisan bill approving a $500 million measure reducing the price of using toll roads.

=== Veterans ===
DeSantis has sharply criticized the United States Department of Veterans Affairs for the Veterans Health Administration scandal of 2014, in which veteran deaths were linked to wait times. He co-sponsored the VA Accountability Act, which aims to increase accountability by providing for the removal or demotion of employees of the Department of Veterans Affairs based on performance or misconduct. He is a member of the Post-9/11 Veterans Caucus. DeSantis worked with a Marine Corps veteran of Afghanistan, Cole Lyle, and a nonprofit in his district, K9s for Warriors, to advance the Puppies Assisting Wounded Servicemembers (PAWS) Act of 2016. The bill sought to expand veteran access to service dogs as a form of treatment for Post Traumatic Stress Disorder at the VA. The bill did not pass in the 115th Congress, but a modified version passed the House of Representatives in 2019.

=== Voting rights ===
DeSantis expressed support for the Voting Rights Restoration for Felons Initiative after it passed in November 2018, saying that he was "obligated to faithfully implement [it] as it is defined" when he became governor. After he refused to restore the voting rights for felons with unpaid fines, which voting rights groups said was inconsistent with the results of the referendum, he was challenged in court. The Florida Supreme Court sided with DeSantis on the issue, and the U.S. Court of Appeals for the Eleventh Circuit also sided with DeSantis in a 6–4 ruling.

In April 2019, DeSantis directed Florida's elections chief to expand the availability of Spanish-language ballots and Spanish assistance for voters. In a statement, DeSantis said "It is critically important that Spanish-speaking Floridians are able to exercise their right to vote without any language barriers."

DeSantis instructed Florida attorney general Ashley Moody to investigate allegations of voter fraud perpetrated by former New York City Mayor Michael Bloomberg after he announced a $16 million investment to pay off the financial obligations for felons so they may vote ahead of the 2020 presidential election in Florida. The allegations asserted Bloomberg had broken the law by offering incentives to vote.

After Donald Trump lost the 2020 election and refused to concede while making claims of widespread voter fraud, DeSantis and other Republicans proposed changes to restrict voting rights in Florida. DeSantis called for eliminating ballot drop boxes, as well as limiting voting by mail by requiring that voters re-register every year to vote by mail and requiring that signatures on mail-in ballots "must match the most recent signature on file" (rather than any of the voter's signatures in the Florida system). The changes to mail-in voting were notable given that Republicans had traditionally voted by mail more than Democrats, but Democrats outvoted Republicans by mail in 2020.
