= The Courage to Be Free =

2023 non-fiction book by Ron DeSantis

The Courage to Be Free: Florida's Blueprint for America's Revival
- Author: Ron DeSantis
- Language: English
- Subject: American politics
- Genre: Government
- Published: February 28, 2023
- Publisher: HarperCollins
- Publication place: United States
- Media type: Hardcover
- Pages: 256
- ISBN: 978-0-0632-7600-0
- OCLC: 1353818509
- Preceded by: Dreams from Our Founding Fathers

The Courage to Be Free: Florida's Blueprint for America's Revival is a non-fiction book authored by Florida governor Ron DeSantis and published by HarperCollins in 2023. A self-described memoir, The Courage to Be Free is DeSantis's second book, following Dreams from Our Founding Fathers: First Principles in the Age of Obama (2011). The Courage to be Free outlines DeSantis's political philosophy and positions.

DeSantis criticizes what he calls the "woke agenda", "the elite", and public health measures, including school closures during the COVID-19 pandemic. He references The Walt Disney Company and the company's response to the Florida Parental Rights in Education Act, devoting an entire chapter to the topic. The Courage to Be Free marks a departure from his previous book; whereas Dreams from Our Founding Fathers criticized Barack Obama for executive overreach, DeSantis defends his use of executive powers to counteract corporations he believes adhere to a self-described woke ideology.

The Courage to Be Free debuted at number one on The New York Times Best Seller list and Amazon's bestsellers list. Critics noted DeSantis's aversion to mentioning former president Donald Trump and a reliance on words such as "woke" and "elite". DeSantis's subsequent book tour following the release of the book was seen by political commentators as a precursor to his presidential campaign in the 2024 United States presidential election.

== Contents summary ==
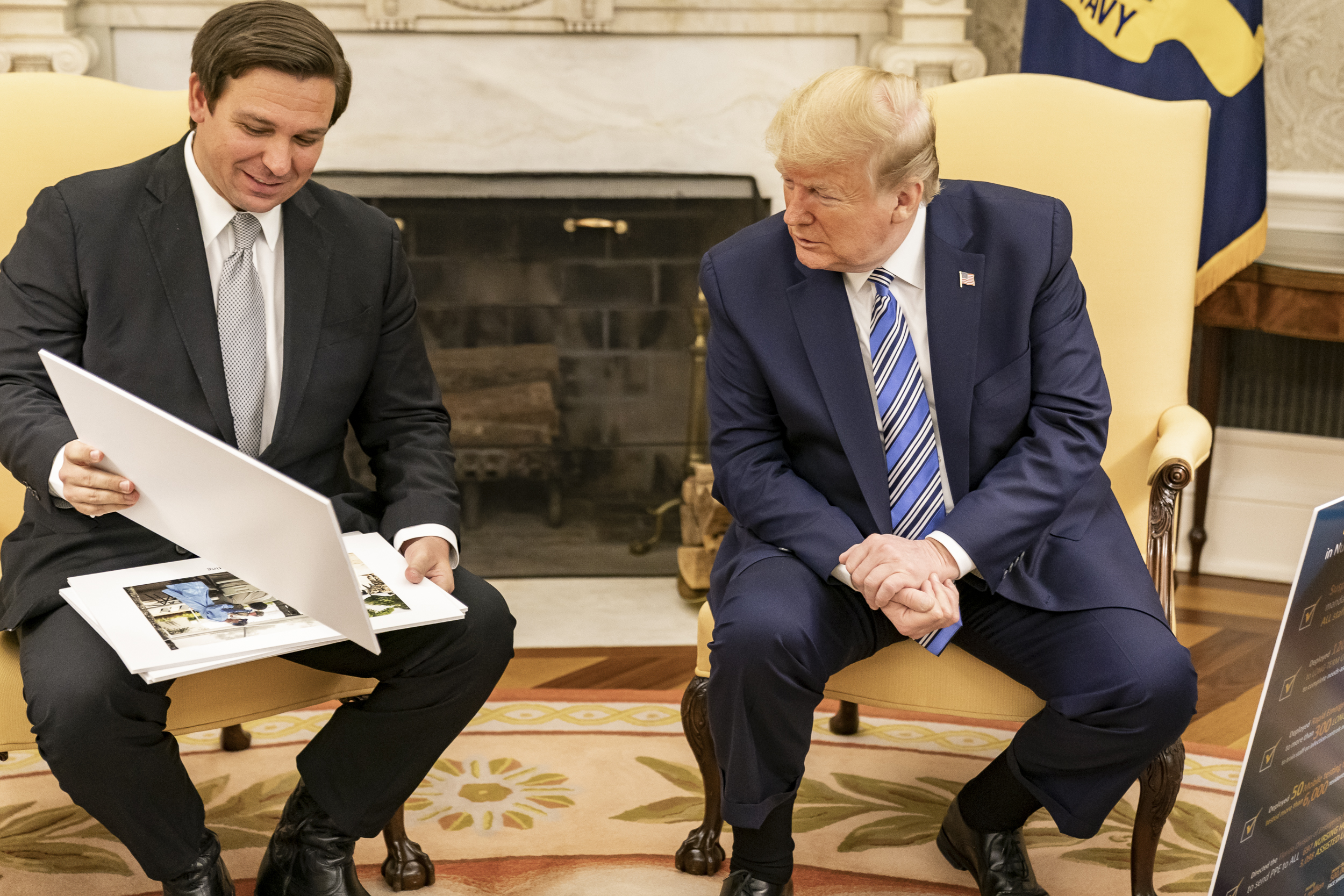
DeSantis discusses his handling of the COVID-19 pandemic in Florida in The Courage to Be Free.

In The Courage to Be Free, Ron DeSantis attacks what he calls "the elite" and the "woke agenda", which he calls "a war on the truth" and "a form of cultural Marxism". DeSantis specifically names Anthony Fauci and claims that public health measures implemented during the COVID-19 pandemic were "heavy-handed". Throughout the book, DeSantis shows contempt for other institutions, including legacy media, the Democratic Party (described as a "woke dumpster fire"), and Big Tech. Regarding Donald Trump, DeSantis avoids mentioning Trump's presidency, although indirectly bemoans him for perceived inaction; "Here we had a unified Republican government for the first time in more than a decade, and yet so much of the time was frittered away on matters like the conspiracy theory that Donald Trump's campaign had colluded with Russia, which GOP-led committees investigated for two years". The Walt Disney Company's opposition to the Florida Parental Rights in Education Act is detailed in the chapter "The Magic Kingdom of Woke Corporatism", writing about his wedding at Disney World and touting his abolition of the Reedy Creek Improvement Act.

On the COVID-19 pandemic in Florida, DeSantis advocates for a relaxed position on businesses and schools, and suggests the United States government should investigate the origin of SARS-CoV-2. DeSantis blames Richard Corcoran, the state's education commissioner during the pandemic, for shutting schools down, and states that he "prodded" Corcoran to open schools back up, based on data from Sweden and South Korea. Additionally, he criticizes Fauci for the federal government's response to the pandemic, suggesting that the models used by the White House Coronavirus Task Force were overexaggerated.

In comparison to his previous book, Dreams from Our Founding Fathers: First Principles in the Age of Obama (2011), DeSantis argues for more executive power, boasting his use of the veto to control Florida's House of Representatives and Senate, and rejecting the Freedom Caucus's position on a small government, of which DeSantis was a member. DeSantis justifies his use of executive power to police "private institutions [that] wield an enormous amount of power over society", and quotes himself telling Ultimate Fighting Championship (UFC) president Dana White that he would "overrule any mayor that gives [the UFC] a hard time". By contrast, in Dreams from Our Founding Fathers, he criticizes Barack Obama for executive overreach, accusing Kathleen Sebelius of using her power to "intimidate private businesses for engaging in speech she didn't like". Additionally, DeSantis is critical of other Republicans governing "as corporatists" and campaigning on "free market principles".

Although described as a memoir, The Courage to be Free mentions few details of DeSantis's career; for instance, his 2016 United States Senate bid is omitted. The book briefly covers DeSantis's enjoyment of baseball and his working-class parents, though it presents his time at Yale University with scorn for the student body's "unbridled leftism". Mentioned in the book is DeSantis's political philosophy, including an overhaul of the federal government, such as reclassifying federal employees such that the president could fire them at will. DeSantis promotes his efforts to relocate the United States Embassy of Israel to Jerusalem and combat Chinese influence in Florida.

== Composition and publication ==
The Courage to Be Free was announced by HarperCollins on November 30, 2022, following rumors that DeSantis may write a memoir. Prior to The Courage to Be Free, DeSantis wrote Dreams from Our Founding Fathers: First Principles in the Age of Obama (2011), using the Constitution to rebuke the presidency of Barack Obama. The book references Obama's memoir Dreams from My Father: A Story of Race and Inheritance (1995). Prior to the book's release, an excerpt was published in the New York Post; additionally, two authorized leaks regarding DeSantis's relationship with former president Donald Trump and a private phone call DeSantis had with Bob Chapek, the former CEO of The Walt Disney Company were published on Fox News. To promote the book, DeSantis made several stops across the United States. At one such event at the Ronald Reagan Presidential Library in Simi Valley, California, protesters gathered outside the entrance. DeSantis's book tour was seen by contemporary political commentators as positioning towards a potential bid for president in the 2024 United States presidential election; DeSantis ended up announcing his decision to run in May 2023.

The Courage to Be Free was published on February 28, 2023, in hardcover format by HarperCollins under the Broadside Books imprint. Broadside Books had previously published books by other conservative political figures, including Jared Kushner's political memoir Breaking History: A White House Memoir (2022). The book debuted at number 1 on The New York Times Best Seller list and Amazon's bestsellers list. According to Broadside Books, the publisher printed 250,000 hardcover copies of The Courage to Be Free. Several weeks after its release, Florida Democrats attempted to use a bill DeSantis signed in March 2022 to get The Courage to Be Free removed from school curricula. Minority leader Fentrice Driskell told The Daily Beast that she plans to get the book banned in as many as fifty counties, citing the book's use of "divisive content"—such as the words woke and gender ideology—and its reference to a video of "dead black children" and the Congressional baseball shooting. DeSantis spokesperson Bryan Griffin called the move a "stunt".

== Critical reception ==
In a review for The New York Times, Jennifer Szalai criticized the memoir for being filled with bland platitudes and culture war "Mad Libs". She noted DeSantis's shifting political philosophy from libertarianism to social conservatism, suggesting that DeSantis's attempts to portray himself as a courageous leader are undermined by his support for restrictive policies. Additionally, Szalai criticized DeSantis's "bullying sense of superiority" and the book's prose, which was contrasted with his admission into Yale University.

Writing for The Washington Post, Manuel Roig-Franzia noted the book's excessive usage of "elite" and DeSantis's aversion to mentioning Trump.

In a review for The Daily Telegraph, Tim Stanley gave the memoir 3 out of 5 stars, stating that it "may support the former President, but DeSantis makes his sophisticated differences from Trump clear".
