= Jennifer Szalai =

New York Times nonfiction critic

Jennifer Szalai is the nonfiction book critic at The New York Times. Szalai was born in Canada and attended the University of Toronto, where she studied political science and peace and conflict. She holds a master's degree in international relations from the London School of Economics.

During the 2000s, she was a senior editor for reviews at Harper's Magazine. Her reviews have also appeared in the London Review of Books and The New Yorker.

She started working as the nonfiction critic for the Times in January 2018, after having worked for four years as an editor for The New York Times Book Review.

Frank Rich referred to Szalai's review of Bob Woodward's book Rage, about the presidency of Donald Trump, as a "Didion-worthy dissection". In February 2023, Szalai wrote a similar review of The Courage to Be Free by Ron DeSantis.
