= Faithful Execution of the Law Act of 2014 =

Unsuccessful bill for DOJ reporting non-enforcement of laws to Congress

- Long title: To amend section 530D of title 28, United States Code.
- Announced in: the 113th United States Congress
- Sponsored by: Rep. Ron DeSantis (R, FL-6)
- Number of co-sponsors: 22

Codification
- U.S.C. sections affected: 28 U.S.C. § 530D

Legislative history
- Introduced in the House as H.R. 3973 by Rep. Ron DeSantis (R, FL-6) on January 29, 2014; Committee consideration by United States House Committee on the Judiciary, United States House Judiciary Subcommittee on the Constitution and Civil Justice

The Faithful Execution of the Law Act of 2014 (H.R. 3973) was an unsuccessful bill that would have directed the United States Department of Justice to report to the United States Congress whenever any federal agency refrains from enforcing laws or regulations for any reason. In the report, the government would have to explain why it had decided not to enforce that law.

The bill was introduced in the United States House of Representatives during the 113th United States Congress.

== Provisions of the bill ==
This summary is based largely on the summary provided by the Congressional Research Service, a public domain source.

The Faithful Execution of the Law Act of 2014 would expand the circumstances under which the Attorney General is required to report to Congress regarding the enforcement of laws to include any instance in which the Attorney General, an officer of the United States Department of Justice (DOJ), or any other federal officer establishes or implements a policy to refrain from: (1) enforcing, applying, or administering any federal statute, rule, regulation, program, policy, or other law within the responsibility of the Attorney General or such officer; or (2) adhering to, enforcing, applying, or complying with, a final decision of any court of jurisdiction respecting the application of the Constitution, any statute, rule, regulation, program, policy, or other law within the responsibility of the Attorney General or such officer. (Currently, reports are not required with respect to the policies of other federal officers and reports concerning nonenforcement of a law are required only when the Attorney General or a DOJ officer refrains on grounds that the provision is unconstitutional.)

The bill would require such reports to state the grounds for policies of nonenforcement.

== Congressional Budget Office report ==
This summary is based largely on the summary provided by the Congressional Budget Office, as ordered reported by the House Committee on the Judiciary on March 5, 2014. This is a public domain source.

The Congressional Budget Office (CBO) estimates that implementing H.R. 3973 would have no significant cost to the federal government. Enacting the bill would not affect direct spending or revenues; therefore, pay-as-you-go procedures do not apply.

Current law requires the United States Department of Justice (DOJ) to submit a report to the Congress if it refrains from enforcing or administering federal laws or regulations because it deems them unconstitutional. H.R. 3973 would direct DOJ to report to the Congress whenever any federal agency refrains from enforcing laws or regulations for any reason. Based on the costs of similar activities currently carried out by DOJ, CBO estimates that implementing the bill would not have a significant effect on the budget because such reporting costs are small and subject to the availability of appropriated funds.

H.R. 3973 contains no intergovernmental or private-sector mandates as defined in the Unfunded Mandates Reform Act and would impose no costs on state, local, or tribal governments.

== Procedural history ==
The Faithful Execution of the Law Act of 2014 was introduced into the United States House of Representatives was introduced on January 29, 2014 by Rep. Ron DeSantis (R, FL-6). It was referred to the United States House Committee on the Judiciary and the United States House Judiciary Subcommittee on the Constitution and Civil Justice. The committee reported the bill alongside House Report 113-376 on March 7, 2014. On March 7, 2014, House Majority Leader Eric Cantor announced that H.R. 3973 would be considered on March 12 or 13, 2014. The House was expected to pass a rule governing debate of this bill and one other on March 12 and then vote on this bill on March 13, 2014.

The DeSantis bill passed in the House by a vote of 244-171 with 18 Democrats voting for it.

== Debate and discussion ==
The Hill reports that the bill is a Republican reaction to "what they say is a string of decisions from President Obama to ignore the will of Congress and the letter of the law." Republicans point to Obama's changes to provisions and deadlines of the Patient Protection and Affordable Care Act (commonly known as "Obamacare") and his changes to the deportation of some immigrants.

The bill's sponsor, Rep. DeSantis spoke in favor of the bill, arguing that "President Obama has not only failed to uphold several of our nation's laws, he has vowed to continue to do so in order to enact his unpopular agenda... The American people deserve to know exactly which laws the Obama administration is refusing to enforce and why."

Rep. Bradley Byrne (R-AL) spoke out in favor of the bill saying, "the Obama Administration has been open and honest about one thing in particular: they have no problem making an end-run around Congress to achieve through administrative means what they cannot legislatively. Placing political convenience above the United States Constitution goes against everything the Founding Fathers intended, and it's time we put a stop to this practice."

== See also ==
- List of bills in the 113th United States Congress
- List of United States federal agencies
