= Congressional pension =

Pension for United States Congress members

Congressional pension is a pension made available to members of the United States Congress. As of 2019, members who participated in the congressional pension system are vested after five years of service. A pension is available to members 62 years of age with 5 years of service; 50 years or older with 20 years of service; or 25 years of service at any age. A reduced pension is available depending upon which of several different age/service options is chosen. If Members leave Congress before reaching retirement age, they may leave their contributions behind and receive a deferred pension later. The current pension program, effective January 1987, is under the Federal Employees Retirement System (FERS), which covers members and other federal employees whose federal employment began in 1984 or later. This replaces the older Civil Service Retirement System (CSRS) for most members of congress and federal employees.

== History ==
Members of Congress voted to extend pension benefits to the legislative branch under the CSRS (formerly limited to the executive branch) in January 1942 under a provision of P.L. 77-411. Congress repealed their pension two months later, due to public outcry in the early months of America's involvement in World War II. It was not until after the war, in 1946, that Congress would be covered under the CSRS with the passage of P.L. 79-601. The justification this time was that a pension would "bring into the legislative service a larger number of younger members with fresh energy and new viewpoints" by encouraging older Members to retire.

The Social Security Amendments of 1983 required all Members of Congress to participate in Social Security beginning January 1, 1984. As Social Security and CSRS benefits sometimes overlapped, Congress called for the development of a new federal employee retirement program to complement Social Security. This new plan was enacted as the Federal Employees' Retirement Act of 1986. This act created the Federal Employees Retirement System (FERS), under which new Members of Congress are currently covered.

When the FERS program went into effect, all Members elected in 1984 or later were automatically enrolled in the new plan. More senior Members were free to remain under the CSRS or enroll in the new FERS plan.

The FERS program takes into account the years served and the average pay for the top three years in terms of payment. For example, a member elected before 1984 and thus qualifying under the CSRS plan, who worked for 22 years and who had a top three-year average salary of $154,267 would be eligible for a pension payment of $84,847 per year. A member elected after 1984 would have been enrolled under the FERS plan, and their pension payment under similar conditions ($154,267 top three-year average salary, but with only 20 years of service, rather than the 22 in the CSRS example) would be $52,451.

The accrual rate for congressional service between 1984 and December 31, 2012, is covered by a FERS "special" computation that is similar to that for Federal employees such as First Responders, FBI Special Agents, and Air Traffic Control Officers. The accrual rate is 1.7% for the first 20 years and 1.0% for each year beyond the 20th. The basic retirement annuity under FERS is equal to the following formula: (Average High-3 Salary x .017 x Years of Service through 20 years)+(High-3 Salary x .01 x Years of Service over 20)= Annual Pension). Members who began congressional service before 1984 and who elected to join FERS will receive credit under FERS from January 1, 1984, forward. Thus, at the close of the 108th Congress in December 2004, participants had a maximum of 21 years of service under FERS. Assuming that a Member retired at the end of 2004 with 20 years of congressional service under FERS, and a high-3 average salary of $154,267, the initial annual FERS pension in 2005 would be: [$154,267 x .017 x 20] = $52,451 There is no maximum pension under FERS. (It would take 66 years of service under FERS to reach the 80% maximum permissible under CSRS.) The smallest unreduced FERS pension is 8.5% of high-3 salary with five years of service (.017 x 5 years), which is payable no earlier than age 62. A Member with 10 years of service who takes a FERS pension at the earliest allowable age of 55 would receive a reduced pension equal to 11% of high-3 salary (.017 x 10 years, reduced by .05 times the seven-year difference between the individual's age at retirement and age 62). For Members of Congress covered by FERS after December 31, 2012, the accrual rate for congressional service covered by FERS is 1.0% per year of service, or, if the Member has at least 20 years of service and serves until at least the age of 62, the benefit accrual rate is 1.1% per year of service. This is the same accrual rate that applies to regular FERS employees and applies to members of Congress first elected in 1984 or later.

In 2002, the average congressional pension payment ranged from $41,000 to $55,000. As of November 2014, senior Members of Congress who have been in office for at least 32 years can earn about $139,000 a year.

All senators and those representatives serving as members prior to September 30, 2003, may decline this coverage. Representatives entering office on or after September 30, 2003, cannot elect to be excluded from such coverage. Members who were already in Congress when Social Security coverage went into effect could either remain in CSRS or change their coverage to FERS.

== Retirement arrangements ==
As of 2019, members are covered under one of four retirement arrangements:

- CSRS and Social Security;
- The “CSRS Offset” plan, which includes both CSRS and Social Security, but with CSRS contributions and benefits reduced by Social Security contributions and benefits;
- FERS; or
- Social Security alone.

Congressional pensions, like those of other federal employees, are financed through a combination of employee and employer contributions. All Members pay Social Security payroll taxes equal to 6.2% of the Social Security taxable wage base ($128,400 in 2018). Members first covered by FERS prior to 2013 also pay 1.3% of full salary to the Civil Service Retirement and Disability Fund (CSRDF). Members of Congress first covered by FERS in 2013 contribute 3.1% of pay to the CSRDF. Members of Congress first covered by FERS after 2013 contribute 4.4% of pay to the CSRDF. Members covered by CSRS Offset pay 1.8% of the first $128,400 of salary in 2018, and 8.0% of salary above this amount, into the CSRDF. Under both CSRS and FERS, Members of Congress are eligible for a pension at the age of 62 if they have completed at least five years of service. Members are eligible for a pension at age 50 if they have completed 20 years of service, or at any age after completing 25 years of service. The amount of the pension depends on years of service and the average of the highest three years of salary. By law, the starting amount of a Member's retirement annuity may not exceed 80% of his or her final salary. There were 611 retired Members of Congress receiving federal pensions based fully or in part on their congressional service as of October 1, 2016. Of this number, 335 had retired under CSRS and were receiving an average annual pension of $74,028. A total of 276 Members had retired with service under FERS and were receiving an average annual pension of $41,076 in 2016.

== Forfeiture ==
In 2003, Ohio representative James Traficant was expelled from Congress after he was convicted of fraud, rackettering and other charges. Several Congressmembers attempted to pass a bill which would prevent expelled members from receiving their pensions. The bill was stalled and eventually dropped after being sent to the House Administration and Reforms committee for review.

In 2007, the Honest Leadership and Open Government Act was enacted. This act provides that a member of Congress convicted of one or more of a list of enumerated felonies (those relating to corruption, election crimes, or official misconduct) will forfeit his or her pension.

== Refusal to participate ==
Congressman Ron Paul refused to participate in the congressional pension system, labeling it "immoral".

Congressman from North Carolina Howard Coble did not participate in the pension system. He campaigned against the system in his first campaign in 1984.

Congressman from MassachusettsBarney Frank chose not to participate in the system. He didn't believe the pension system would be in his best interest, because as a gay man he was unable to marry at the beginning of his congressional career and thus he would be unable to leave pension benefits to a spouse. Frank also used actuarial assumptions to determine he might not live long enough to more than break even on his contributions into the pension system.

In 2019, Florida governor Ron DeSantis opted out of his congressional pension.
