= Ron DeSantis =

Governor of Florida since 2019

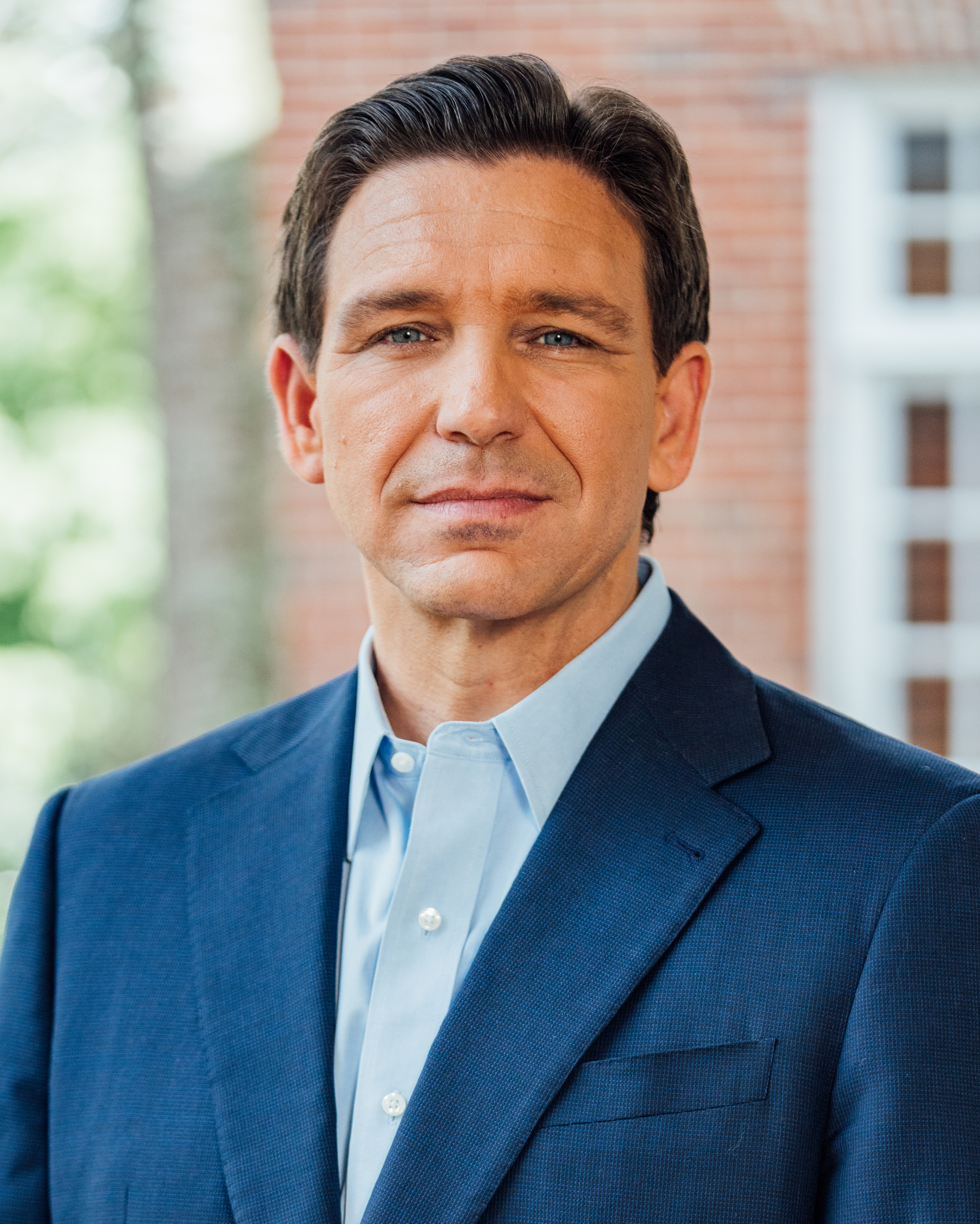
- Official portrait, 2023

46th Governor of Florida
- Incumbent
- Assumed office January 8, 2019
- Lieutenant: Jeanette Nuñez; Jay Collins
- Preceded by: Rick Scott

Member of the U.S. House of Representatives from Florida's 6th district
- In office January 3, 2013 – September 10, 2018
- Preceded by: Cliff Stearns (redistricted)
- Succeeded by: Mike Waltz

Personal details
- Born: Ronald Dion DeSantis; September 14, 1978 (age 48) Jacksonville, Florida, U.S.
- Party: Republican
- Spouse: Casey Black (m. 2009)
- Children: 3
- Education: Yale University (BA); Harvard University (JD)
- Website: Campaign website

Military service
- Branch/service: United States Navy; Navy Reserve
- Years of service: 2004–2010 (active); 2010–2019 (reserve)
- Rank: Lieutenant Commander
- Unit: Navy Judge Advocate General's Corps
- Battles/wars: Iraq War
- Awards: Bronze Star Medal; Navy and Marine Corps Commendation Medal; Global War on Terrorism Service Medal; Iraq Campaign Medal
- DeSantis's voice DeSantis on the death of Fidel Castro. Recorded November 30, 2016

Ronald Dion DeSantis (/dɪˈsæntɪs, diː-/; born September 14, 1978) is an American politician, attorney, and former naval officer serving since 2019 as the 46th governor of Florida. A member of the Republican Party, he served from 2013 to 2018 as the U.S. representative from Florida's 6th congressional district. DeSantis was a candidate for the 2024 Republican presidential nomination, withdrawing his candidacy in January 2024.

Born in Jacksonville, Florida, DeSantis graduated from Yale University with a Bachelor of Arts and from Harvard Law School with a Juris Doctor. He joined the U.S. Navy in 2004 and was promoted to lieutenant before serving as a legal advisor to SEAL Team One. He was stationed at Joint Task Force Guantanamo in 2006 and was deployed to Iraq in 2007. When DeSantis returned to the U.S. about eight months later, the U.S. attorney general appointed DeSantis to serve as a special assistant U.S. attorney at the U.S. Attorney's Office in the Middle District of Florida, a position he held until his honorable discharge from active military duty in 2010.

DeSantis was first elected to Congress in 2012 and was reelected in 2014 and 2016. During his tenure, he became a founding member of the Freedom Caucus and was an ally of President Donald Trump. He briefly ran for U.S. Senate in 2016 but withdrew when incumbent senator Marco Rubio sought reelection. After winning the Republican nomination in the 2018 gubernatorial election, DeSantis defeated Tallahassee mayor and Democratic nominee Andrew Gillum by 0.4%.

DeSantis was governor during the COVID-19 pandemic, as well as during major hurricanes Ian, Helene, and Milton. He encouraged the passage of the Parental Rights in Education Act and the Heartbeat Protection Act. In the 2022 gubernatorial election, he defeated former governor Charlie Crist by 19.4%, the largest margin for either party in a gubernatorial race since 1982. In his second term, DeSantis signed Florida Senate Bill 266 and established the Florida departments of Commerce and Government Efficiency. On May 24, 2023, DeSantis announced his candidacy for the Republican nomination for president of the United States. On January 21, 2024, he withdrew from the presidential race and endorsed Trump.

== Early life and education ==
Ronald Dion DeSantis was born on September 14, 1978, in Jacksonville, Florida, to parents Karen DeSantis (née Rogers) and Ronald Daniel DeSantis. His middle name, Dion, honors the singer Dion DiMucci, and his family name has different pronunciations. His mother's family name, Rogers, was chosen by her grandfather (né Ruggiero) upon immigrating from Italy. All of DeSantis's great-grandparents immigrated from Southern Italy (Note: DeSantis's great-grandparents were originally from comuni in the provinces of L'Aquila (Cansano, Bugnara, Pacentro and Pratola Peligna, in Abruzzo region), Caserta (Sessa Aurunca, in Campania region), Avellino (Castelfranci, in Campania region) and Campobasso (Castelbottaccio, in Molise region). His paternal great-grandfather Nicola DeSantis was originally from Cansano, Abruzzo region. His paternal grandfather was Daniel DeSantis, born in Beaver, Pennsylvania, to Nicola and his wife Maria. DeSantis's maternal great-great-grandfather, Salvatore Storti, immigrated to the U.S. in 1904. He eventually settled in Pennsylvania, where his wife, Luigia Colucci, joined him in 1917.) during the first Italian diaspora. His parents and all of his grandparents were born and grew up in Western Pennsylvania and Northeast Ohio.

DeSantis's mother worked as a nurse and his father installed Nielsen TV-rating boxes. They met while attending Youngstown State University in Youngstown, Ohio, during the 1970s and moved to Jacksonville, Florida, during that decade. His family then moved to Orlando, Florida, before relocating when he was six years old to the city of Dunedin in Florida's Tampa Bay area. His only sibling, younger sister Christina, died in 2015 at age 30 from a pulmonary embolism. He was a member of the Dunedin National team that made it to the 1991 Little League World Series in Williamsport, Pennsylvania. DeSantis attended Our Lady of Lourdes Catholic School and Dunedin High School, graduating in 1997.

After high school, DeSantis studied history at Yale University. He was captain of Yale's varsity baseball team; he played outfield, and as a senior in 2001 he had the team's best batting average at .336. DeSantis is a member of the Delta Kappa Epsilon fraternity and of the St. Elmo Society, one of Yale's secret societies. While attending Yale, he worked a variety of jobs, including as an electrician's assistant and a coach at a baseball camp. DeSantis graduated from Yale in 2001 with a B.A., magna cum laude.

After Yale, DeSantis taught history and coached for a year at Darlington School in Georgia, then attended Harvard Law School, graduating in 2005 with a Juris Doctor, cum laude. At Harvard, he was business manager for the Harvard Journal of Law and Public Policy.

== Military service ==
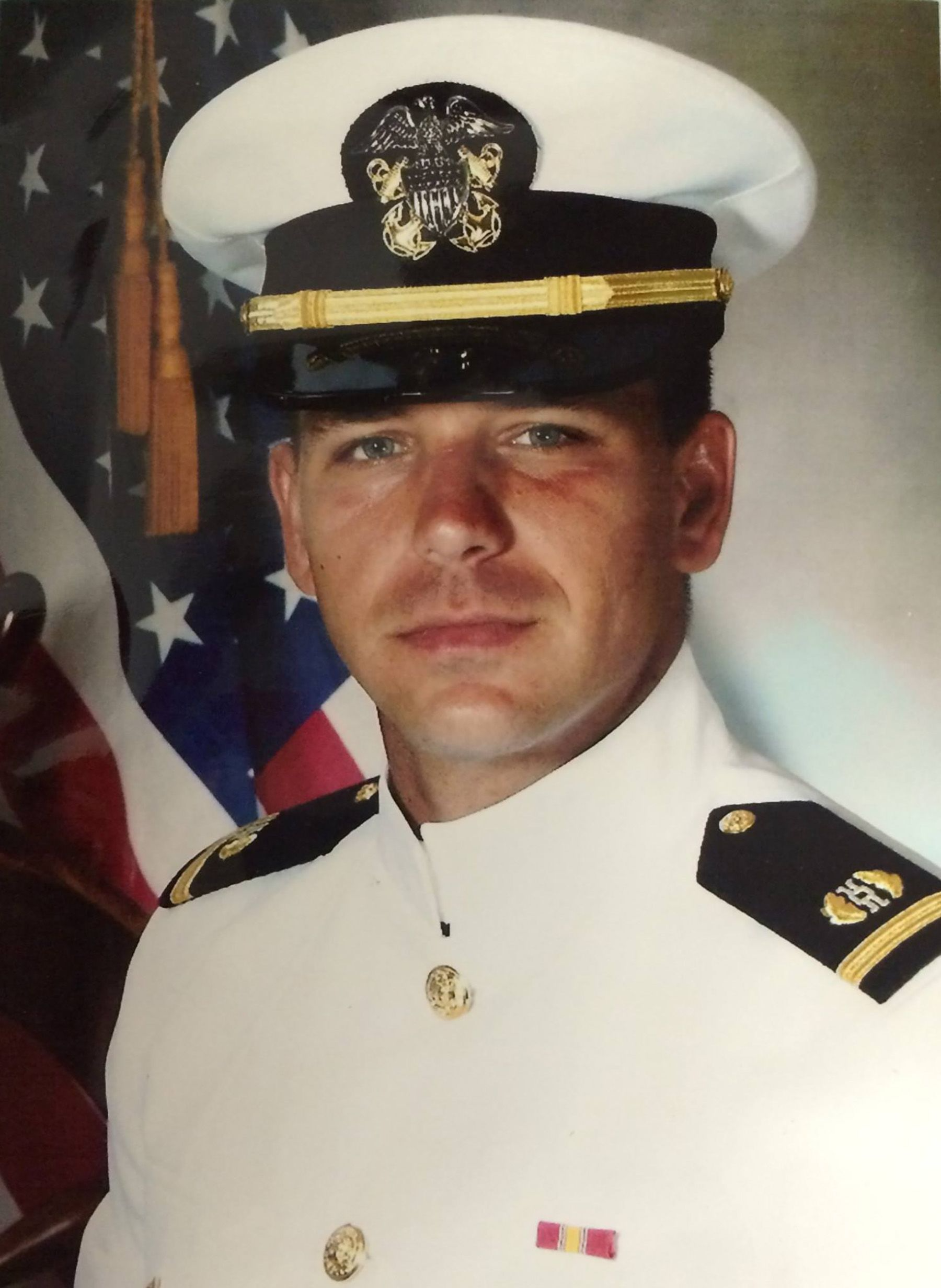
DeSantis as a U.S. Navy ensign of United States Navy Judge Advocate General's Corps, c. 2005

In 2004, during his second year at Harvard Law, DeSantis was commissioned as an officer in the U.S. Navy and assigned to the Navy Judge Advocate General's Corps. He completed Naval Justice School in 2005. Later that year, he reported to the Judge Advocate General Trial Service Office Command South East at Naval Station Mayport, Florida, as a prosecutor. He was promoted from lieutenant, junior grade to lieutenant in 2006.

In the spring of 2006, DeSantis arrived at Joint Task Force Guantanamo, working with detainees at the Guantanamo Bay detention camp. The publicly released records of his service in the Navy were redacted, with the Navy citing a personal-privacy exception to the Freedom of Information Act. Mansur Ahmad Saad al-Dayfi, who was held at Guantanamo, alleged in 2022 that DeSantis oversaw the force-feeding of detainees and DeSantis acknowledged that he advised the commander of the base about the use of force feeding.

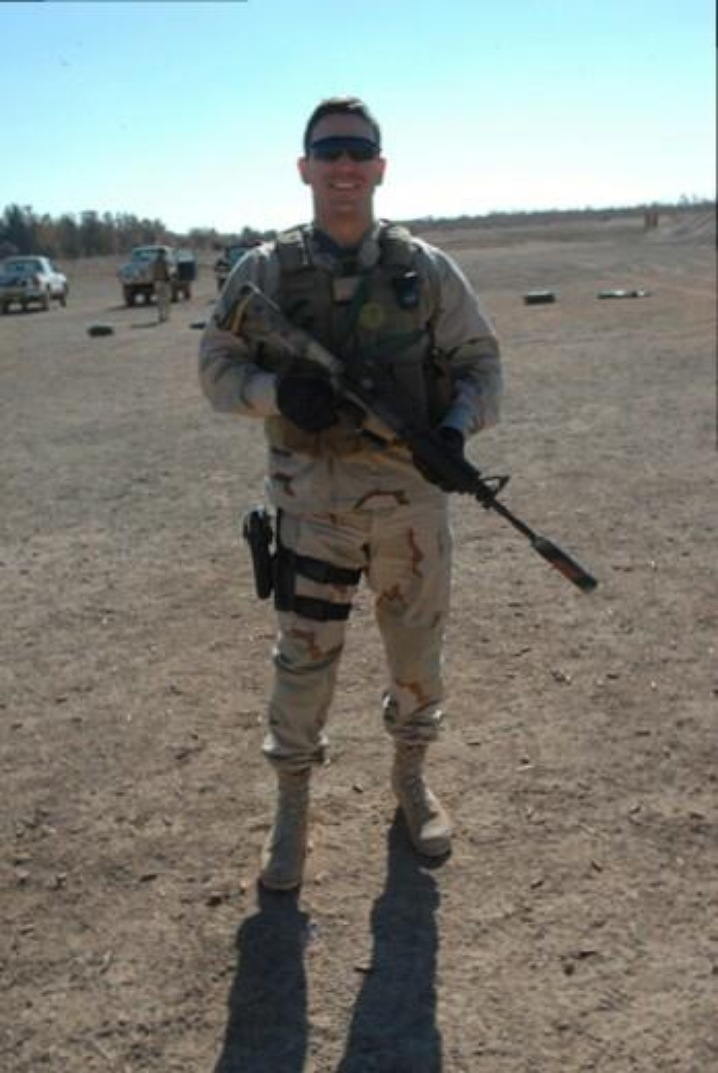
DeSantis while on deployment to Iraq

In 2007, DeSantis reported to the Naval Special Warfare Command Group in Coronado, California, where he was assigned as a legal adviser to SEAL Team One; he deployed to Iraq in the fall of 2007 as part of the troop surge. He served as legal adviser to Dane Thorleifson, the SEAL Commander of the Special Operations Task Force-West in Fallujah.

DeSantis returned to the U.S. in April 2008, reassigned to the Naval Region Southeast Legal Service. He was appointed to serve as a special assistant U.S. attorney at the U.S. Attorney's Office in the Middle District of Florida. DeSantis was assigned as a trial defense counsel until his honorable discharge from active duty in February 2010. He concurrently accepted a reserve commission as a lieutenant in the Judge Advocate General's Corps of the U.S. Navy Reserve.

During his military career, DeSantis was awarded the Bronze Star Medal, the Navy and Marine Corps Commendation Medal, the Global War on Terrorism Service Medal, and the Iraq Campaign Medal. His Navy Reserve service ended in February 2019, a month after his gubernatorial inauguration, with the rank of lieutenant commander.

=== Post-naval career ===
With two law-school friends, DeSantis founded an LSAT test-prep company, LSAT Freedom, that one of the other co-founders billed as "the only LSAT prep courses designed exclusively by Harvard Law School graduates". DeSantis also worked as a litigator at the Miami-based law firm Holland & Knight before running for Congress in 2012.

== U.S. House of Representatives (2013–2018) ==
=== Elections ===
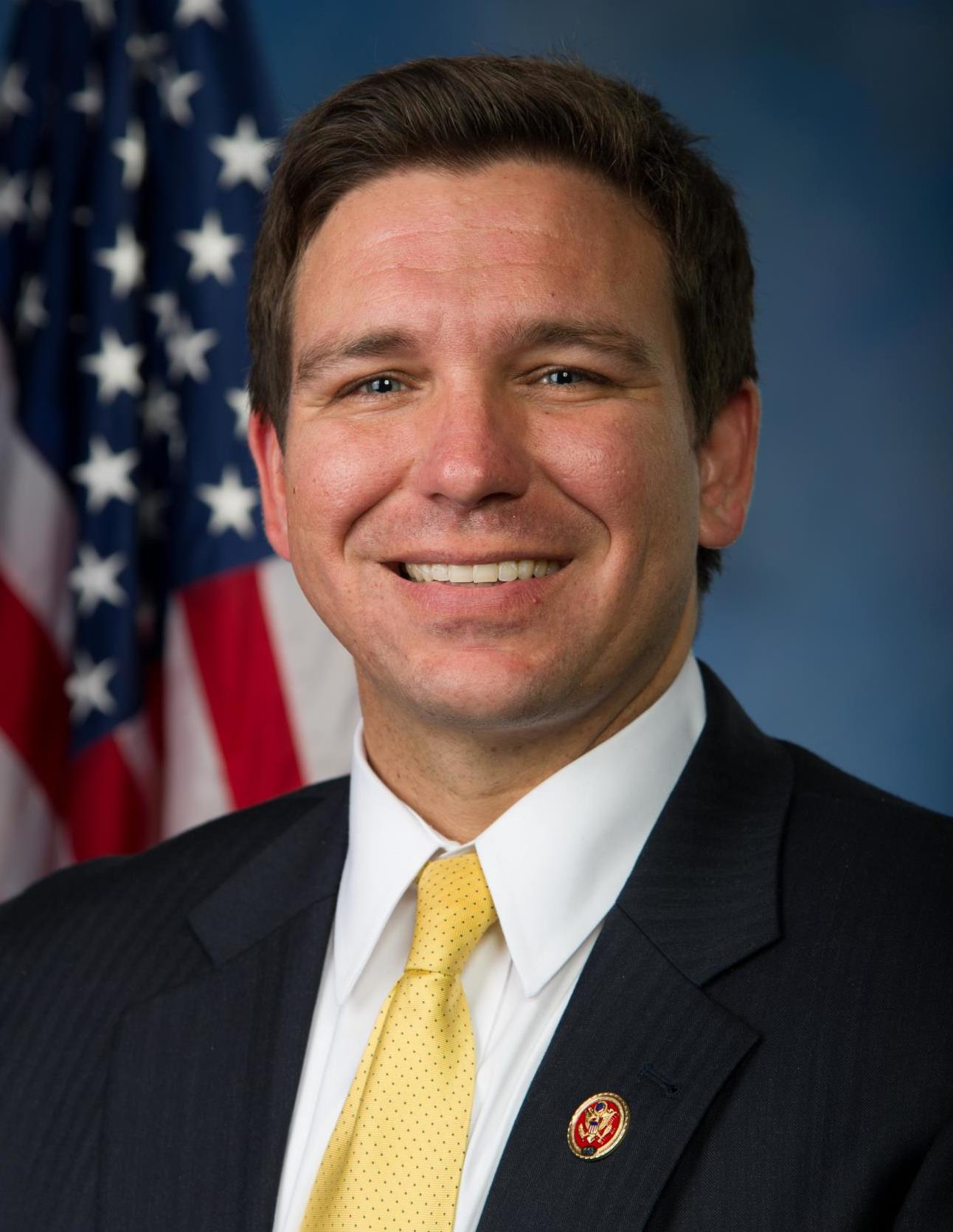
DeSantis's U.S. House of Representatives official portrait (c. 2013)

In 2012, DeSantis ran for the U.S. House of Representatives from Florida's 6th congressional district. During his campaign, he aligned himself with the conservative Tea Party movement. His campaign was financially supported by the Koch Brothers' organizations FreedomWorks and Club for Growth. U.S. senator Mike Lee and former United Nations ambassador John Bolton helped DeSantis campaign and raise money. In August, DeSantis defeated six candidates in the Republican primary and then defeated Democratic nominee Heather Beaven in the November general election. He was reelected in 2014 and 2016.

In May 2015, DeSantis announced his candidacy for the 2016 United States Senate election in Florida. He ran for the seat held by Marco Rubio, who initially did not file to run for reelection due to his 2016 presidential campaign. DeSantis was endorsed by the Koch Brothers' fiscally conservative Club for Growth, which had previously supported his U.S. House campaign. When Rubio ended his presidential bid and ran for reelection to the Senate, DeSantis withdrew from the Senate race, instead running for reelection to the House.

=== Tenure ===
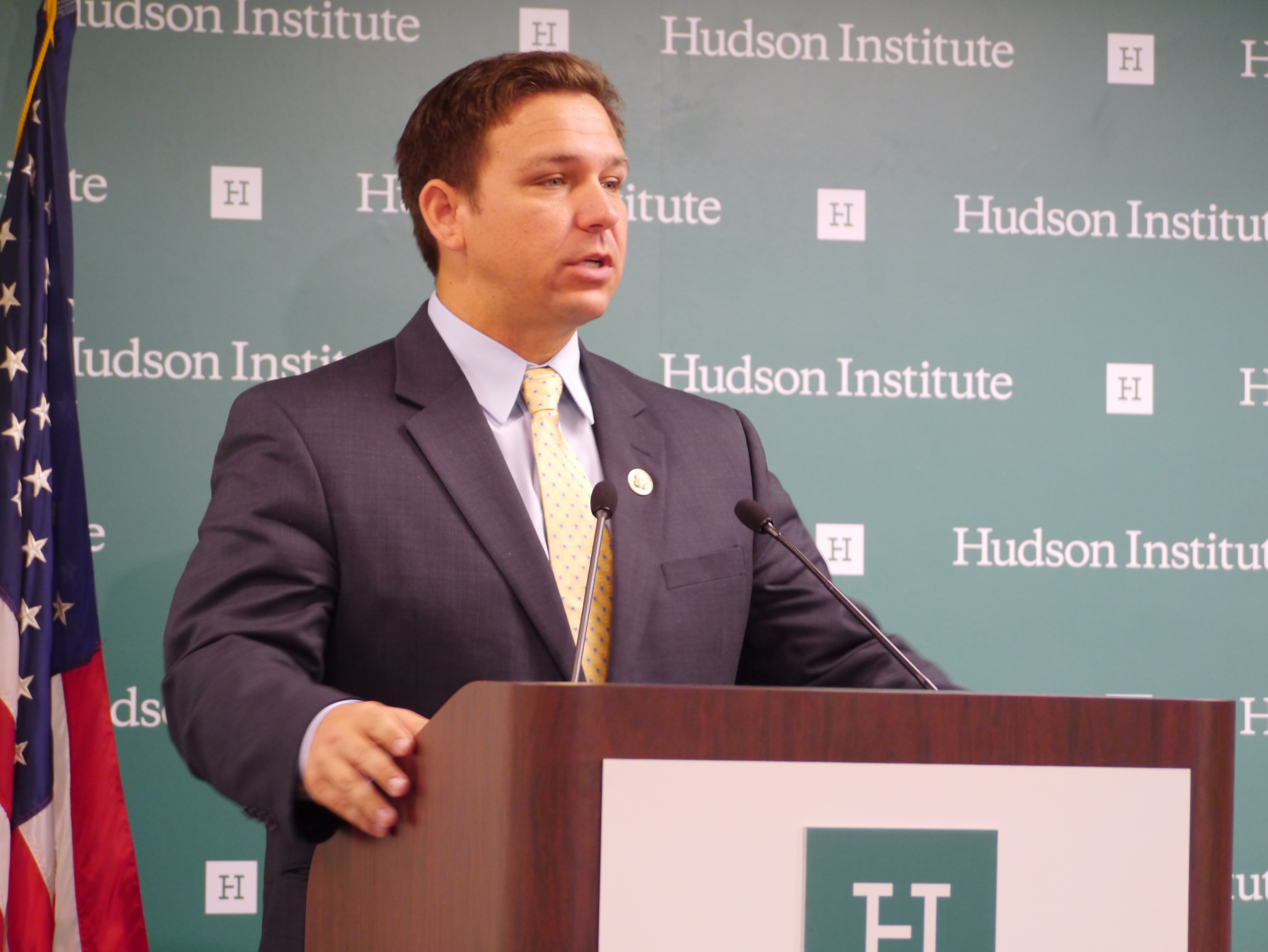
DeSantis speaking at the Hudson Institute in June 2015

DeSantis signed a 2013 "No Climate Tax Pledge" against any tax hikes to fight global warming. He voted in favor of H.R. 45, which would have repealed the Affordable Care Act in 2013. DeSantis introduced a bill in 2014 that would have required the Justice Department to report to Congress whenever any federal agency refrained from enforcing laws. In 2015, DeSantis was a founding member of the Freedom Caucus, a group of congressional conservatives and libertarians.

DeSantis opposes gun control and received repeated "A" ratings from the NRA Political Victory Fund. He has said, "Very rarely do firearms restrictions affect criminals. They really only affect law-abiding citizens."

DeSantis was a critic of Obama's immigration policies, including deferred action legislation (DACA and DAPA), accusing Obama of failing to enforce immigration laws. In 2015 he co-sponsored Kate's Law, which would have increased penalties for aliens who unlawfully reenter the U.S. after being removed. DeSantis encouraged Florida sheriffs to cooperate with the federal government on immigration-related issues.

In 2016, DeSantis introduced the Higher Education Reform and Opportunity Act, which would have allowed states to create their own accreditation systems. He said this legislation would also give students "access to federal loan money to put towards non-traditional educational opportunities, such as online learning courses, vocational schools, and apprenticeships in skilled trades".

In 2016, DeSantis received a "0" rating from the Human Rights Campaign for his voting record on LGBT-related legislation. Two years later, he told the Sun Sentinel that he "doesn't want any discrimination in Florida, I want people to be able to live their life, whether you're gay or whether you're religious."

DeSantis was present before the June 2017 congressional baseball shooting, and the perpetrator asked him whether the players were Republicans. Later that summer, DeSantis proposed legislation that would have ended funding by November of that year for the Mueller investigation of President Trump. He said that the May 17, 2017, order that initiated the probe "didn't identify a crime to be investigated" and was likely to start a fishing expedition.

DeSantis supports a constitutional amendment to impose term limits on members of Congress, so that U.S. representatives would be limited to three terms and senators to two. He served three terms in the House of Representatives, retiring in 2018 to run for governor of Florida.

==== Fiscal policy ====
DeSantis said that the debate over how to reduce the federal deficit should shift emphasis from tax increases to curtailing spending and triggering economic growth. He is a past supporter of replacing the federal income tax and the IRS with a federal sales tax called the FairTax, by cosponsoring legislation to do so as a U.S. representative. He supported a "no budget, no pay" policy for Congress to encourage passage of a budget resolution. DeSantis endorsed the REINS Act, which would have required that regulations significantly affecting the economy be subject to a vote of Congress before taking effect. He also supported auditing the Federal Reserve System.

DeSantis supported the 2014 Venezuelan protests, calling them peaceful and a result of Venezuela's "socialist" economic policy. He heavily criticized the Venezuelan government's response to the protests, saying its actions resembled techniques used by Cuban leader Fidel Castro. For alleged IRS targeting of conservatives, DeSantis asked for IRS commissioner John Koskinen's resignation for having "failed the American people by frustrating Congress's attempts to ascertain the truth." He cosponsored a bill to impeach Koskinen for violating the public's trust. DeSantis criticized IRS employee Lois Lerner and asked that she testify to Congress.

In 2014, DeSantis introduced the Let Seniors Work Act, the companion of a similar bill introduced by Marco Rubio in the Senate. The bill would have repealed an incentive to retire instead of keep working and would have exempted those above 65 from the 12.4% Social Security payroll tax; he also cosponsored a measure to eliminate taxes on Social Security benefits. According to PolitiFact, it is "half true" that DeSantis voted to cut Social Security and Medicare and voted to increase the retirement age, because those votes were on non-binding resolutions that would not have become law even if passed, and because the objective was to stabilize those social programs to avoid steeper cuts later.

Conservative think tank Citizens Against Government Waste named DeSantis a "Taxpayer Superhero" in 2015. DeSantis sponsored the Transportation Empowerment Act, which would have transferred much of the responsibility for transportation projects to the states and sharply reduced the federal gas tax. He opposed legislation to require online retailers to collect and pay state sales tax. He voted for the 2017 Trump tax cuts.

DeSantis opted not to receive his congressional pension and filed a measure that would eliminate pensions for members of Congress.

=== Committees ===
During the 114th United States Congress, DeSantis served on the Committee on Oversight and Accountability, and chaired its Subcommittee on National Security. He also served on the Foreign Affairs Committee, Judiciary Committee, and the Republican Study Committee, along with several subcommittees of those.

== Gubernatorial campaigns ==
DeSantis was elected governor of Florida in 2018 and reelected in 2022. He is not eligible to run for a third term in 2026.

=== 2018 candidacy ===
2018 election results map by county DeSantis: 50–60% 60–70% 70–80% 80–90% Gillum: 50–60% 60–70%

On January 5, 2018, DeSantis filed to run for the office of governor to replace term-limited Republican incumbent Rick Scott. President Trump had said the previous month that he would support DeSantis should he run for governor. During the Republican primary, DeSantis emphasized his support for Trump by running an ad in which DeSantis taught his children how to "build the wall" and say "Make America Great Again". Asked whether he could name an issue on which he disagreed with Trump, DeSantis declined. On August 28, 2018, DeSantis won the Republican primary, defeating his main opponent, Adam Putnam.

DeSantis's gubernatorial platform included support for legislation that would allow people with concealed weapons permits to carry firearms openly. He also supported a law mandating the use of E-Verify by businesses and a state-level ban on sanctuary city protections for undocumented immigrants. DeSantis promised to stop the spread of polluted water from Lake Okeechobee. He expressed support for a state constitutional amendment to require a supermajority vote for any tax increases. DeSantis opposed allowing able-bodied, childless adults to receive Medicaid. He said he would implement a medical cannabis program, while opposing the legalization of recreational cannabis.

The day after his primary win, in a televised Fox News interview, DeSantis said, "The last thing we need to do is to monkey this up by trying to embrace a socialist agenda with huge tax increases and bankrupting the state." His use of the word "monkey" received widespread media attention and was interpreted by some, including Florida Democratic Party chair Terrie Rizzo, as a racist dog whistle alluding to the Democratic gubernatorial nominee, Andrew Gillum, who is African-American. DeSantis denied the racism charge. A campaign spokesperson said the comment was only about policy and "to characterize it as anything else is absurd". Dexter Filkins, writing in The New Yorker in 2022, called it a "disastrous gaffe" and quoted an unnamed ally of DeSantis lamenting that afterward, "We were handling Gillum with kid gloves. We can't hit the guy, because we're trying to defend the fact that we're not racist."

The general election was "widely seen as a toss-up." Some sheriffs endorsed DeSantis, while other sheriffs backed Gillum. DeSantis was endorsed by the Florida Police Chiefs Association. On September 5, he announced state representative Jeanette Núñez as his running mate. He resigned his House seat on September 10 to focus on his gubernatorial campaign. The same month, he canceled a planned interview with the Tampa Bay Times to have additional time to put together a platform before an in-depth policy interview. On election night, initial results had DeSantis winning, and so Gillum conceded. Gillum rescinded his concession when the margin narrowed to 0.4 percent, and an automatic machine recount began with a November 15 deadline. Although three counties missed the deadline, it was not extended. DeSantis was confirmed as the winner and Gillum conceded on November 17.

=== 2022 candidacy ===
2022 election results map by county DeSantis: 50–60% 60–70% 70–80% 80–90% >90% Crist: 50–60% 60–70%

In September 2021, DeSantis announced he would run for reelection. On November 7, he filed the necessary paperwork to officially enter the race. In the general election, he faced Democratic nominee Charlie Crist, a U.S. representative and former Florida governor. Crist heavily criticized DeSantis's decision to transport illegal immigrants to Democratic states, arguing that it was human rights abuse. During an interview with Bret Baier on Fox News, Crist called DeSantis "one of the biggest threats to democracy".

The gubernatorial debate was held on October 23, and the candidates exchanged attacks. At one point, Crist asked DeSantis whether he would serve a full four-year term, in relation to talk about a potential DeSantis campaign for president in 2024. DeSantis responded, "the only worn-out old donkey I'm looking to put out to pastures is Charlie Crist". On the campaign trail DeSantis criticized Crist's role as a U.S. representative, and at the debate said that Crist showed up for work for only 14 days during 2022.

DeSantis won the November 8 election in a landslide, with 59.4 percent of the vote to Crist's 40 percent; it was the largest margin of victory in a Florida gubernatorial election since 1982. Significantly, DeSantis won Miami-Dade County, which had been considered a Democratic stronghold and had last voted Republican in 2002, and Palm Beach County, which had not voted Republican since 1986. Crist conceded the election shortly after DeSantis was projected as the winner. At DeSantis's victory rally, supporters chanted "two more years" at various times rather than the common "four more years" to show support for DeSantis for president in 2024.

== Governor of Florida (2019–present) ==
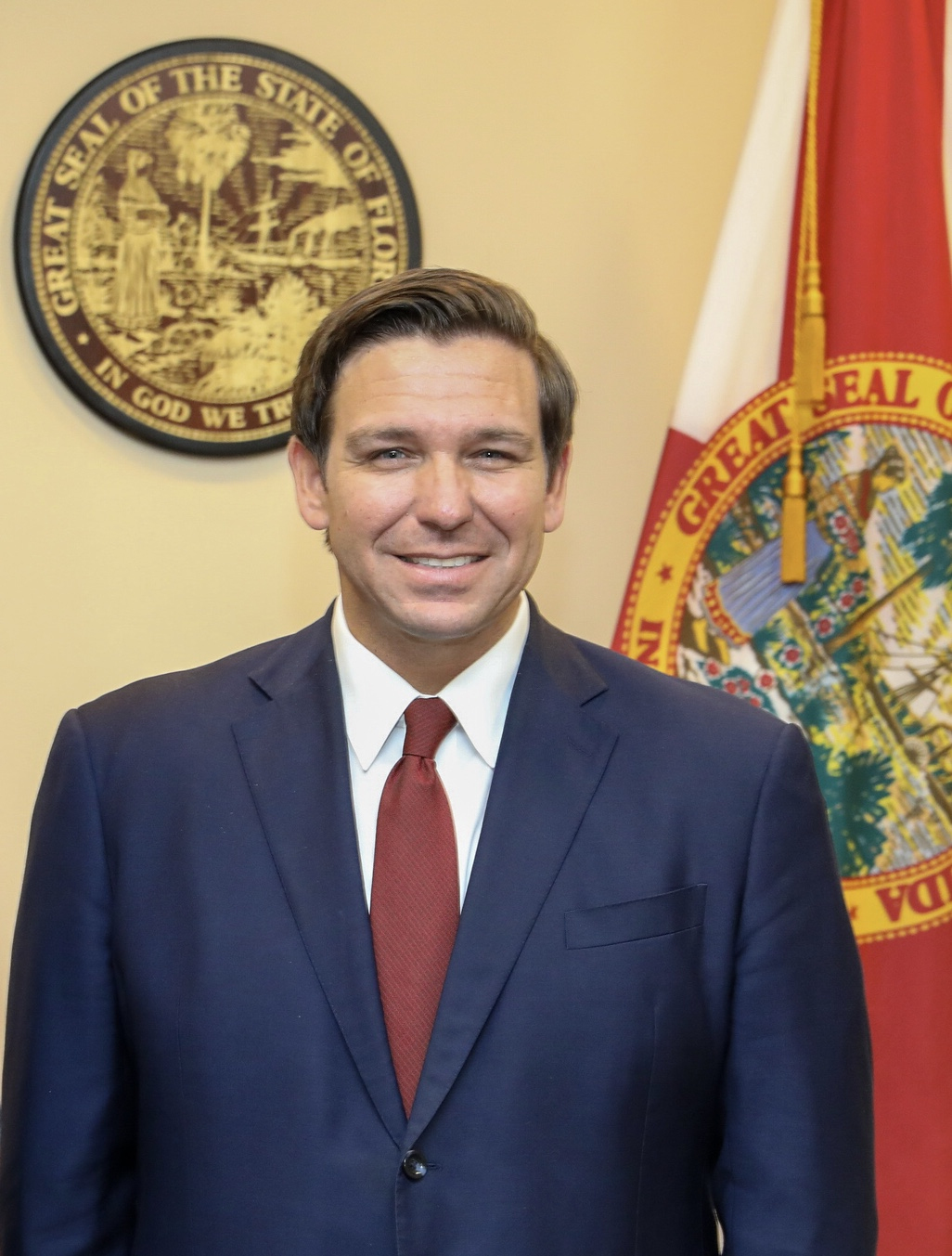
DeSantis's official portrait during his first term as governor

DeSantis became governor of Florida on January 8, 2019. Inaugurated at age 40, he was the youngest person to assume the office since Park Trammell in 1913 and the youngest Republican ever to hold the position. He has generally governed as a conservative. On January 11, 2019, he posthumously pardoned the Groveland Four, a group of black men falsely convicted of rape in 1949. The same day, he officially suspended Broward County sheriff Scott Israel, ostensibly for his responses to the mass shootings at the Marjory Stoneman Douglas High School, appointing Gregory Tony to replace him. In its 2021 session, the Florida legislature passed DeSantis's top priorities. During his tenure, the Republican-dominated Florida Legislature enacted much of DeSantis's legislative agenda, often on rapid timelines. Maximizing the power of the governor's office, DeSantis exerted pressure on Republican legislative leaders.

=== Economic ===
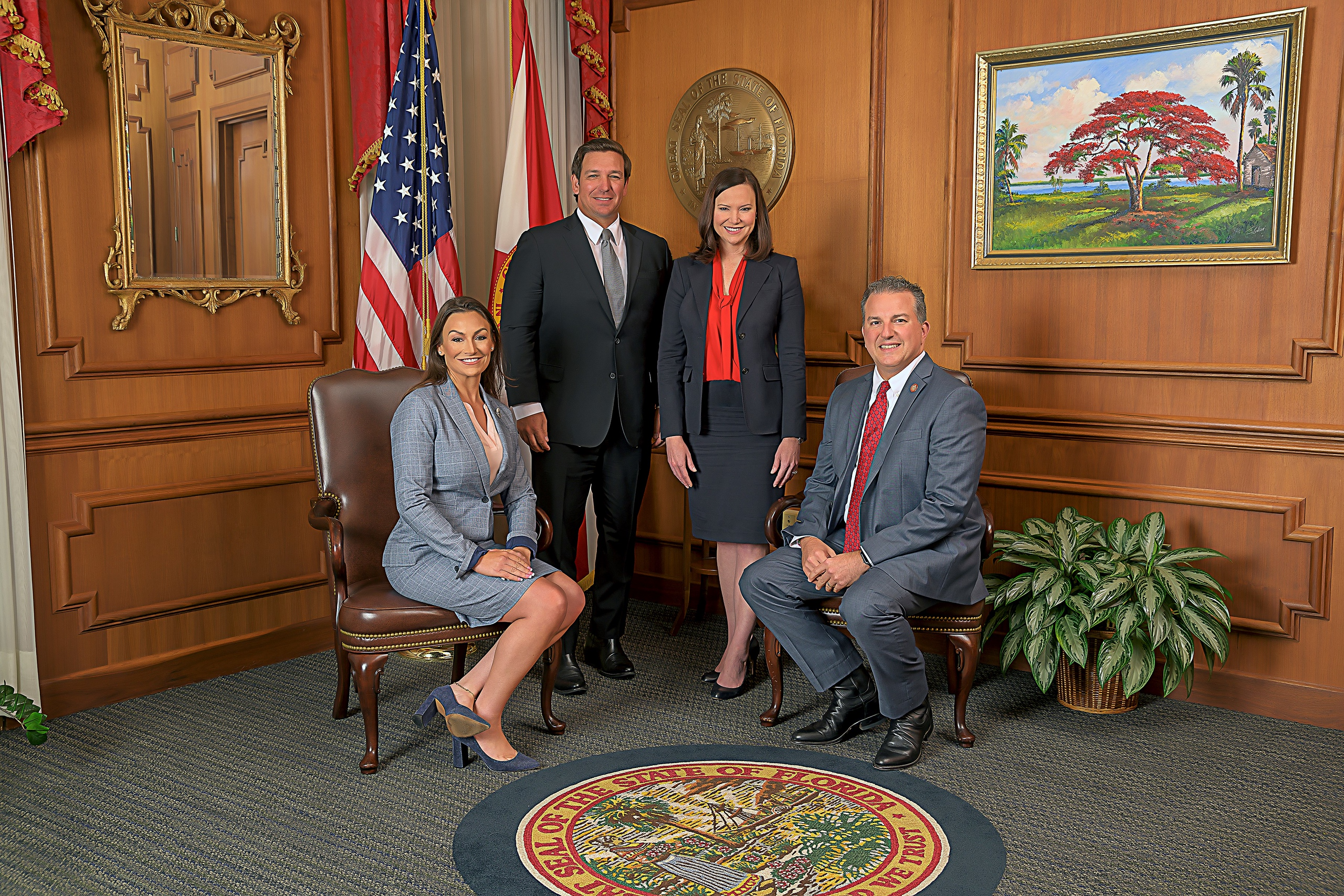
DeSantis with Florida Attorney General Ashley Moody, Chief Finance Officer Jimmy Patronis, and Agriculture Commissioner Nikki Fried in 2019

During his 2018 gubernatorial campaign, DeSantis pledged to lower corporate income taxes to 5 percent or lower. During his tenure, corporate income taxes in Florida got as low as 3.5 percent in 2021, but by 2022 they had increased to 5.5 percent. DeSantis has maintained Florida's low-tax status during his time as governor. In June 2019, DeSantis signed a $91.1 billion budget the legislature passed the previous month, which was the largest in state history at the time, though he cut $131 million in appropriations. In June 2021, he signed a $101.5 billion budget; he used his line-item veto to veto $1.5 billion (of which $1 billion was in federal American Rescue Plan Act money for an emergency response fund). The budget DeSantis signed was more than $9 billion higher than Florida's current state spending plan.

During the COVID-19 pandemic in 2020, DeSantis blamed former governor Rick Scott for "revamping the state's unemployment insurance system with pointless roadblocks that he said were designed to prevent people from claiming benefits", saying it created massive backlogs earlier in the year as the pandemic decimated the economy. Afterward, Florida's economy swiftly started recovering, and the unemployment rate fell below 7 percent by the latter half of 2020. In December 2020, DeSantis ordered the Florida Department of Economic Opportunity to extend unemployment waivers until February 27, 2021. By the end of 2020, the Cato Institute, a libertarian think tank, graded DeSantis "B" in its biennial fiscal policy report on America's governors. Since May 2022, Florida's unemployment rate has sat around two percent, below the national average.

On November 22, 2021, because of a significant increase in gasoline prices, DeSantis announced that he would temporarily waive Florida's gasoline tax in the next legislative session, in 2022. Florida had a record state budget surplus in 2023.

In 2023, DeSantis reestablished the Florida Department of Commerce, consolidating Visit Florida, Enterprise Florida and the Florida Department of Economic Opportunity.

While in Congress, DeSantis supported proposals to raise the retirement age (i.e., the age to qualify for Medicare and Social Security) to 70 and to privatize Medicare, turning it into a "premium support" system. While running for president in 2023, DeSantis reversed his position, saying, "we’re not going to mess with Social Security."

=== Education ===
In June 2021, DeSantis led an effort to ban the teaching of critical race theory in Florida public schools (though it had not been part of Florida's public school curriculum). He described critical race theory as "teaching kids to hate their country", reflecting an attack by conservatives nationally. The Florida Board of Education approved the ban on June 10. The Florida Education Association criticized the ban, accusing the board of trying to hide facts from students. Other critics said the ban was an effort to "politicize classroom education and whitewash American history".

On September 14, 2021, DeSantis announced that Florida would replace the Florida Standards Assessment (FSA) test with a system of three smaller tests throughout the school year, in the fall, winter and spring. The new system was implemented in the 2022–23 school year.

On December 15, 2021, DeSantis announced a new bill, the Stop Wrongs to Our Kids and Employees Act ("Stop WOKE Act"), which would allow parents to sue school districts that teach critical race theory. He framed the bill as a bill to combat "woke indoctrination" that would "teach our kids to hate our country or hate each other." On August 18, 2022, federal judge Mark E. Walker blocked enforcement of the act as applied to businesses, ruling that it violated the First Amendment and was impermissibly vague. Walker later blocked enforcement of the act as applied to public universities for similar reasons, writing that the legislation is "positively dystopian" because it "officially bans professors from expressing disfavored viewpoints in university classrooms while permitting unfettered expression of the opposite viewpoints."

=== Election law and voting rights ===
DeSantis expressed support for the Voting Rights Restoration for Felons Initiative after it passed in November 2018, saying he was "obligated to faithfully implement [it] as it is defined" when he became governor. After he refused to restore voting rights for felons with unpaid fines, which voting rights groups said was inconsistent with the referendum's results, he was challenged in court. The Florida Supreme Court sided with DeSantis on the issue, and the U.S. Court of Appeals for the Eleventh Circuit also sided with DeSantis in a 6–4 ruling.

In April 2019, DeSantis directed Florida's elections chief to expand the availability of Spanish-language ballots and Spanish assistance for voters. In a statement, DeSantis said, "It is critically important that Spanish-speaking Floridians are able to exercise their right to vote without any language barriers."

In June 2019, DeSantis signed a measure that would make it harder to launch successful ballot initiatives. Petition-gathering for ballot initiatives to legalize medical cannabis, increases to the minimum wage, and expansion of Medicaid were also under way. DeSantis instructed Florida Attorney General Ashley Moody to investigate whether Michael Bloomberg had criminally offered incentives for felons to vote by assisting in a fundraising effort to pay off their financial obligations so they could vote in the 2020 presidential election in Florida. No wrongdoing was found.

In February 2021, DeSantis announced his support for eliminating ballot drop boxes and limiting voting by mail by requiring that voters re-register every year to vote by mail and that signatures on mail-in ballots "match the most recent signature on file" (rather than any of the voter's signatures in the Florida system). The changes to mail-in voting were notable given that Republicans had historically voted by mail more than Democrats, but Democrats outvoted Republicans by mail in 2020. According to a Tampa Bay Times analysis, DeSantis's signature match proposal could have led to rejections of his own mail-in ballots due to changes in his signature history over time; voting rights experts argued that the signature matching proposal could be used to disenfranchise voters whose signatures varied over time.

=== Abortion limits ===
After the U.S. Supreme Court decided Dobbs v. Jackson Women's Health Organization, which overturned Roe v. Wade, DeSantis pledged to "expand pro-life protections". On April 14, 2022, he signed into law a bill that bans abortions after 15 weeks of pregnancy; under the previous law, the limit had been 24 weeks. The law includes exceptions for abortions beyond 15 weeks if they are necessary to avert "serious risk" to the pregnant woman's physical health or if there is a "fatal fetal abnormality" but makes no exceptions for rape, human trafficking, incest, or mental health.

The law was expected to go into effect on July 1, 2022, but a state judge blocked its enforcement, ruling that it violated the right to privacy guaranteed by the Florida Constitution. After DeSantis appealed the ruling, the law went into effect on July 5, pending judicial review. In January 2023, the Supreme Court of Florida agreed to hear a legal challenge to the law.

In April 2023, DeSantis signed a six-week abortion ban. The legislation contains exceptions allowing abortion up to 15 weeks in cases in which the pregnancy was a result of rape, incest, or human trafficking, but requires the woman to provide proof of a crime before being permitted an abortion under any of those exceptions. The bill will make providing an abortion a felony punishable by up to five years in prison, ban telemedicine for abortion, and limit the availability of medication abortion. The six-week ban went into effect on May 1, 2024, after the Supreme Court of Florida upheld the 15-week ban on April 1, 2024.

=== Tech platforms ===
On February 2, 2021, DeSantis announced support for legislation to hold tech companies accountable to prevent alleged political censorship. In response to social media networks removing Trump from their platforms, DeSantis and other Florida Republicans pushed legislation in the Florida legislature to prohibit tech companies from de-platforming political candidates. A federal judge blocked the law by preliminary injunction the day before it was to take effect, on the grounds that it violated the First Amendment and federal law. Florida petitioned the U.S. Supreme Court to review the Eleventh Circuit ruling, and the Court accepted the petition for review. The Court held that the wrong First Amendment analysis had been applied and remanded the case to the Eleventh Circuit to apply the correct analysis. The injunction against the Florida law remains in effect.

When Twitter suspended DeSantis administration critic Rebekah Jones's account for violating rules against spam and platform manipulation, DeSantis's office applauded the decision, calling it "long overdue".

DeSantis supported Elon Musk's acquisition of Twitter, calling "it illegal for tech platforms to block or demote content that might otherwise run afoul of their terms of service".

In 2024, Desantis signed into a law a bill that requires social media platforms to prohibit people under 16 years old from making accounts. The law has been criticized by digital rights organizations like Netchoice, which said it "forces Floridians to hand over sensitive personal information to websites or lose their access to critical information channels. This infringes on Floridians' First Amendment rights to share and access speech online", and that "the Supreme Court has made clear that the government lacks the 'free-floating power to restrict the ideas to which children may be exposed'".

=== COVID-19 response ===
During 2020 and 2021, scientists and media outlets initially gave mixed reviews of DeSantis's handling of the COVID-19 pandemic. From March 2020 through March 22, 2023, Florida had the 12th-highest rate of cases and deaths per 100,000 people among the 50 states, Washington, D.C., and Puerto Rico, without adjusting for the age of Florida's large and vulnerable elderly population. Florida's age-adjusted death rate, which takes its disproportionately elderly population into account, was roughly near the median among states as of 2021, and a 2022 study placed it at the nation's 12th lowest. In 2021 a federal court upheld Desantis's ban on mask mandates in schools, which he argued gave parents back their authority under the Parental Rights Bill. By 2023, many political scientists agreed that DeSantis's management of the pandemic may have benefited him in his reelection campaign, and he was credited with turning "his coronavirus policies into a parable of American freedom". According to the Census Bureau, 259,000 people moved to Florida between July 2020 and July 2021 and another 311,000 from 2021 to 2022.

=== LGBT rights ===
On June 1, 2021, DeSantis signed the Fairness in Women's Sports Act (SB 1028). It bans transgender girls and women from participating and competing in middle-school and high-school girls' and college women's sports competitions. The law took effect on July 1.

In February 2022, DeSantis voiced support for the Florida Parental Rights in Education Act (HB1557), referred to by opponents as the "Don't Say Gay" law, which prohibits discussion of sexual orientation or gender identity in school classrooms from kindergarten to grade 3. He said it was "entirely inappropriate" for teachers and school administrators to talk to students about their gender identity. DeSantis signed the bill into law in March 2022, and it took effect on July 1, 2022. This statute also includes a provision "requiring school district personnel to encourage a student to discuss issues relating to his or her well-being with his or her parent or to facilitate discussion of the issue with the parent", and does not limit such issues to sexual orientation or gender identity. As of March 2023, DeSantis was considering further similar legislation for all grades. On April 19, the state board of education extended the act's restrictions on classroom instruction to grades 4–12, unless the instruction is required by existing state standards or is part of an elective course on reproductive health.

==== Dispute with Disney ====
The Walt Disney Company, owner of Walt Disney World in Florida, called for the law's repeal, beginning a dispute between Disney and the state government. In April 2022, DeSantis signed a bill eliminating the company's special independent district act and replacing its Disney-appointed board of overseers. He also threatened during a press conference to build a new state prison near the Disney World complex. On April 26, 2023, Disney filed suit against DeSantis and several others, accusing them of retaliating against protected speech. DeSantis's attorneys filed a motion to dismiss Disney's lawsuit on June 26, claiming that the governor and state legislators have "legislative immunity". The lawsuit was dismissed on January 31, 2024, with Disney vowing to appeal. On March 27, 2024, Disney settled its pending state court lawsuits with DeSantis. Per the agreement, Disney put the appeal of its federal lawsuit on hold while a new development agreement with Florida was negotiated. But no alterations to Disney's appeal of the federal lawsuit were made. The settlement came a day after DeSantis replaced two Disney critics on the Central Florida Tourism Oversight District with two Disney supporters and two weeks after a court largely overturned The Parental Rights in Education Act.

=== Policing and law enforcement ===
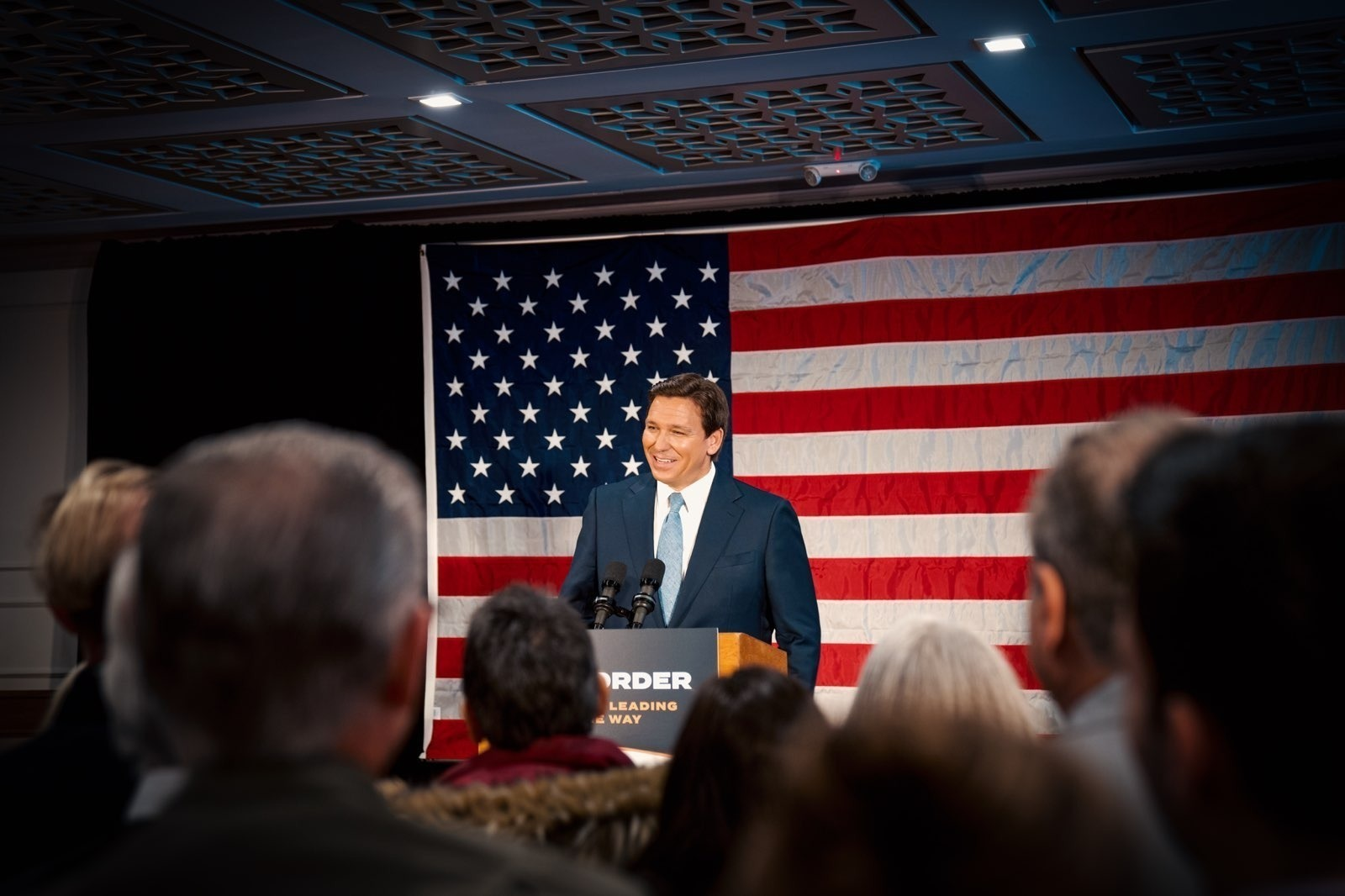
DeSantis at a pro-law enforcement rally in Staten Island

DeSantis opposes efforts to defund the police, and as governor has introduced initiatives to "fund the police". In September 2021, he introduced a $5,000 signing bonus for Florida police officers in a bid to attract out-of-state police recruits.

In April 2021, DeSantis signed into law the Combating Public Disorder Act he had been advocating. Aside from being an anti-riot statute, it forbade intimidation by mobs; penalized damage to historic properties or memorials, such as downtown Miami's Christopher Columbus statue, which was damaged in 2020; and forbade publishing personal identifying information online with intent to harm. DeSantis had argued for this legislation by citing the George Floyd protests of 2020 and the 2021 United States Capitol attack, although only the former was mentioned at the signing ceremony. Several months after the signing, a federal judge blocked the portion of the law that introduced a new definition of "riot", calling it too vague.

On May 5, 2021, DeSantis announced that all Florida police officers, firefighters, and paramedics would receive a $1,000 bonus.

On December 2, 2021, DeSantis announced that as part of a $100 million funding proposal for the Florida National Guard, $3.5 million would be allocated to the reactivation of the Florida State Guard, a volunteer state defense force that had been inactive since 1947.

In 2022, DeSantis signed a bill creating an election police unit to investigate election fraud. At a press event in September 2024, he defended the unit's visits to the homes of Florida voters who had signed an abortion rights ballot initiative.

=== Immigration and refugees ===
In June 2019, DeSantis signed an anti-"sanctuary city" bill into law. Florida had no sanctuary cities before the law's enactment, and immigration advocates called the bill politically motivated.

Florida became the 12th state to adopt legislation requiring local governments to aid federal immigration-enforcement efforts. In June 2020, DeSantis signed a bill requiring government employers and contractors to use E-Verify. He had originally called for all employers to be required to use it. A few years later, he signed into law an expansion of E-Verify and other immigration laws.

In 2021, DeSantis halted cooperation with the Biden administration's program to relocate and resettle migrants in Florida in the wake of a surge in illegal immigration. DeSantis's administration also allocated $12 million for relocating migrants to other states.

In September 2022, after similar actions by Texas Governor Greg Abbott, an agent of DeSantis recruited 50 newly arrived asylum seekers, mostly from Venezuela, in San Antonio, Texas, and flew them via two chartered planes to the Crestview, Florida airport, where they did not debark, then proceeded to Martha's Vineyard, Massachusetts. The migrants filed a class-action suit against DeSantis, which was later dismissed, calling his treatment of them "extreme and outrageous, and utterly intolerable in a civilized community".

In May 2023, DeSantis announced plans to send over 1,000 personnel to Texas, including National Guard troops, to help Texas stem the influx of illegal immigration across the southern border.

=== Hurricane Ian response ===
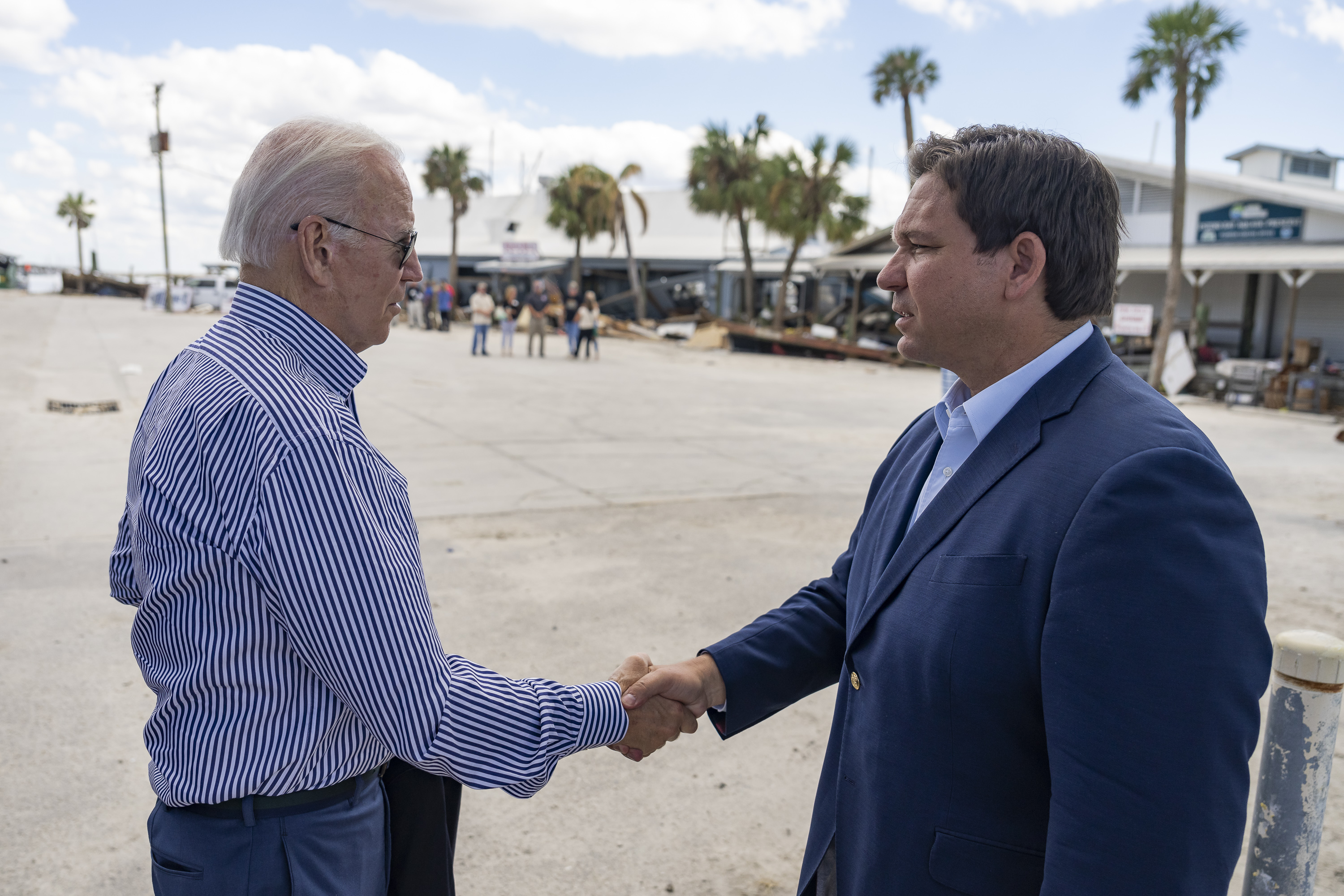
President Joe Biden and Governor DeSantis greet each other in Fort Myers for a briefing on response and recovery efforts after Hurricane Ian.

DeSantis was widely praised for the state's response to Hurricane Ian — the deadliest hurricane to hit Florida in 87 years. In September 2022, DeSantis declared a state of emergency for all of Florida as Ian approached and asked for federal aid ahead of time. On October 5, after Ian deserted Florida, President Biden arrived in Florida and met with DeSantis and Senators Marco Rubio and Rick Scott. DeSantis and Biden held a press conference in Fort Myers, at which Biden said DeSantis had "done a good job", to report on the status of the cleanup. In addition, DeSantis partnered with Elon Musk, CEO of SpaceX and Tesla, Inc., to use the Starlink satellite Internet service to help restore communication across the state.

=== Environment ===
DeSantis supported programs dedicated to environmental conservation and protection from flooding in Florida. At the same time, he questioned climate science, supported fossil fuels, opposed renewables, and sanctioned firms for considering environmental issues in their investments.

The Inflation Reduction Act and the Infrastructure Investment and Jobs Act gave Florida $3.75 million for urban forests and nature, $209,000 for fighting pollution, and $78.7 million to protect the state from climate change impacts.

DeSantis refused to accept $346 million from the Inflation Reduction Act for rebates to homeowners who want to retrofit their houses, make it more energy efficient, $3 million to fight pollution, and a program to help low-income people buy solar panels, as well as $24 million from the Infrastructure Investment and Jobs Act for improving sewage systems in rural areas. The rebates were requested by Florida energy office and the legislature, but DeSantis vetoed them. All other governors, including Republicans, accepted the money. The money could go to local cities and authorities, and three Florida cities received some funds. Rhode Island and Kentucky requested to take Florida's money for themselves. The program should help people lower their energy bills and weatherize their houses while creating jobs. Half the money should go to low-income households. Making a house more energy-efficient can cut utility bills by 25% for an average family. DeSantis later reversed course and attempted to reclaim some of the rejected home energy rebate funds.

In June 2024, DeSantis vetoed a bill passed by the State House that would have created a statewide process managed by the Department of Health to issue closures and send warnings if the bacteria in waterways reached unsafe levels.

=== Hope Florida ===
During the 2025 legislative session, DeSantis and his former chief of staff, James Uthmeier, were involved in a controversy over the transfer of $10,000,000 from a Medicaid settlement to a political committee Uthmeier controlled. The money was initially directed to go to the Hope Florida Foundation, but was immediately transferred by the foundation to two separate groups, both of which sent it to Uthmeier's political committee. Legislators accused Uthmeier of money laundering and wire fraud for his role in directing the Medicaid settlement as DeSantis's chief of staff, then soliciting the applicants who requested the money from the Hope Florida Foundation, both of which immediately transferred it to a bank account under his control.

On May 20, 2025, State Attorney Jack Campbell opened a criminal investigation into the allegations of money laundering and wire fraud.

== 2024 presidential campaign ==
DeSantis's 2024 campaign logo

In 2020–23, media outlets saw DeSantis as a likely candidate for the 2024 presidential election, and notable people urged him to run. In April 2023 Trump led DeSantis in national polls for the Republican nomination, but DeSantis was performing better in battleground polling of the general election. In a straw poll at the 2022 Conservative Political Action Conference DeSantis came in second with 28%, to Trump's 59%. In 2022, DeSantis became seen as a contender for the nomination. Writers predicted he could defeat Trump or said he was preferable to Trump in view of the January 6 hearings and straw polls. These ideas gained more traction after the 2022 midterm elections, when DeSantis was reelected governor by almost 20 percentage points, while Trump-endorsed candidates, such as Mehmet Oz in the Senate race in Pennsylvania, performed poorly. In 2024, due to the controversy that arose over Pete Hegseth's nomination as Secretary of Defense, Trump considered nominating DeSantis instead.

The release of DeSantis's memoir, The Courage to Be Free, and book tour, increased 2024 speculation. On May 24, 2023, DeSantis officially launched his bid for president. It was announced on X, then called Twitter, with assistance from its owner, Elon Musk; the launch was marred by technical glitches.

On January 21, 2024, two days before the New Hampshire primary, DeSantis announced on X that he was suspending his campaign and endorsed Trump. He had finished in a distant second to Trump in the Iowa caucuses the previous week. DeSantis's campaign finished with nine delegates to the Republican National Convention. Despite having already dropped out, DeSantis still had his name on the ballot in the 2024 Florida Republican presidential primary and received 3.7% of the vote.

== Personal life ==
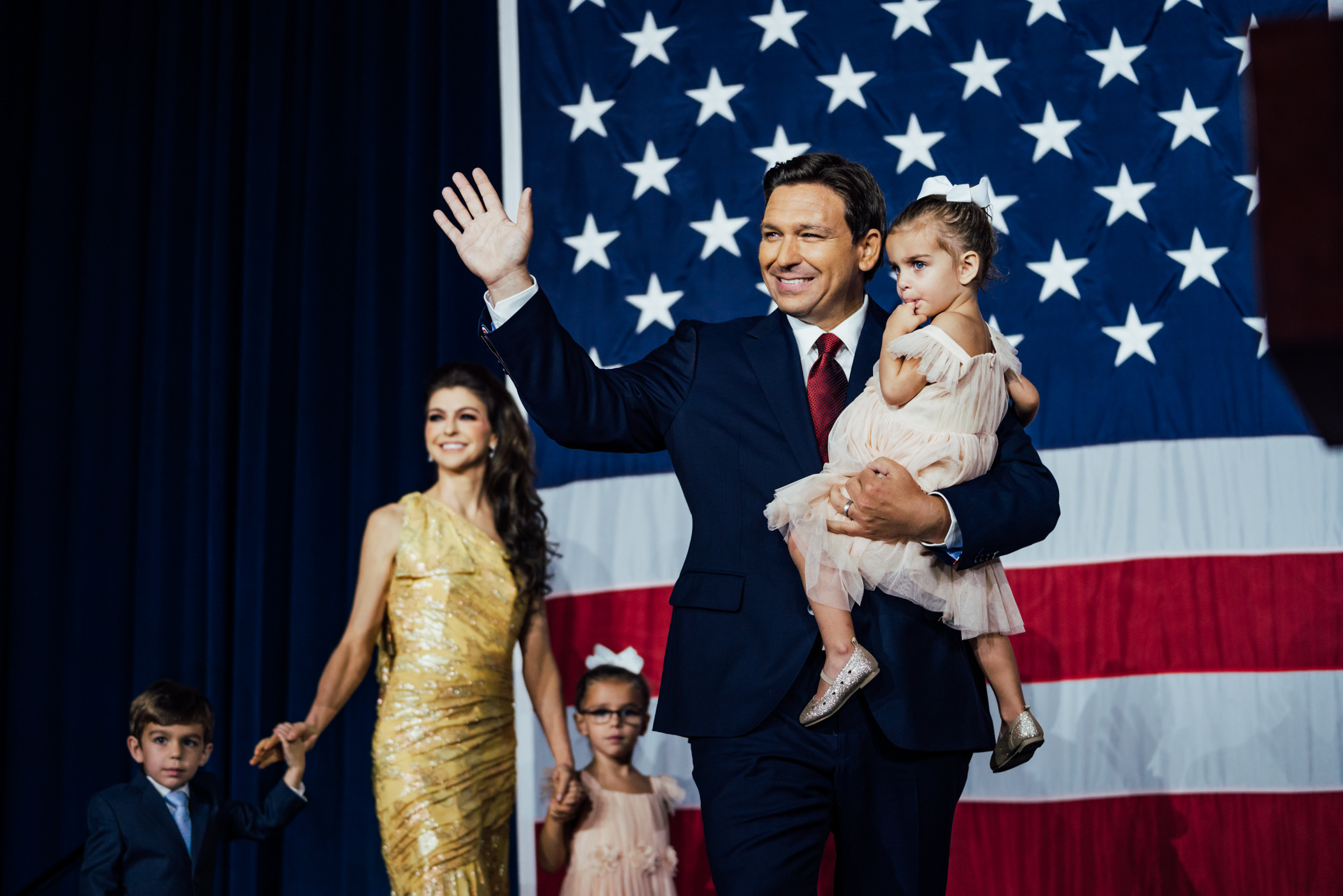
DeSantis family on the night of the 2022 Florida gubernatorial election

DeSantis met his wife, Casey Black, at a golf course at the University of North Florida. She had been a television host for the Golf Channel, and then a television journalist and news anchor at WJXT. They married on September 26, 2009, in a chapel at Disney's Grand Floridian Resort & Spa. DeSantis is Catholic, as was his wedding ceremony.

The couple lived in Ponte Vedra Beach, near St. Augustine, until it was drawn into the neighboring 4th congressional district. They then moved to a condo owned by Kent Stermon in Palm Coast, north of Daytona Beach, which remained in the district he represented: the 6th. They have three children, born in 2016, 2018 and 2020.

He is a member of the Veterans of Foreign Wars and the American Legion. In 2022, DeSantis appeared on Time 100, Time's annual list of the 100 most influential people in the world. As of September 2023, his net worth was estimated at $1.5 million, up from $300,000 in 2021; his $1.25 million book deal with HarperCollins in 2022 made him a millionaire by the end of that year.

== Publications ==
- DeSantis, Ron (2011). Dreams from Our Founding Fathers: First Principles in the Age of Obama. Jacksonville: High-Pitched Hum Publishing. ISBN 978-1-934666-80-7.
- DeSantis, Ron (2023). The Courage to Be Free: Florida's Blueprint for America's Revival. HarperCollins. ISBN 978-0063276000.

== See also ==
- List of governors of Florida

== Notes ==
U.S. House of Representatives
Preceded by Cliff Stearns	Member of the U.S. House of Representatives from Florida's 6th congressional district 2013–2018	Succeeded by Mike Waltz
Party political offices
Preceded by Rick Scott	Republican nominee for Governor of Florida; 2018, 2022	Succeeded by Byron Donalds
Political offices
Preceded by Rick Scott	Governor of Florida; 2019–present	Incumbent
U.S. order of precedence (ceremonial)
Preceded by JD Vance as Vice President	Order of precedence of the United States; Within Florida	Succeeded by Mayor of city in which event is held
Preceded by JD Vance as Vice President	Order of precedence of the United States; Within Florida	Succeeded by Otherwise Mike Johnson as Speaker of the House
Preceded by Gretchen Whitmer as Governor of Michigan	Order of precedence of the United States; Outside Florida	Succeeded by Greg Abbott as Governor of Texas
