= Retirement earnings test (US) =

Under the United States social security system, workers who have reached 62 but have not yet reached the full social security retirement age are subject to a retirement earnings test, which effectively defers benefits for people whose earnings are above a given threshold.

== Applicability ==
The test only applies to people who are below the normal retirement age, which ranges from 65 to 67 years old, depending on the person's year of birth. For beneficiaries working before the calendar year in which they reach the Normal Retirement Age, current benefits are reduced by $1 for every $2 in wages over the lower bracket amount. For beneficiaries working in the calendar year they reach the Normal Retirement Age, but before they have turned the Normal Retirement Age, current benefits are reduced by $1 for every $3 in wages for earnings over the upper limit bracket. The earnings test does not apply if a person is at or beyond the normal retirement age, is under the normal retirement age but has disability payments, or is living outside of the United States and working in a job that is not covered by Social Security.

The reduction of benefits does not represent a decrease in expected lifetime benefits; it in fact only defers those benefits to later years. When a worker who was subject to the earnings test reaches the Normal Retirement Age, the earnings test no longer applies to him. In addition, monthly benefits are increased to replace those taken by the earnings test. As a result, on average the earnings test has little or no effect on the worker's total lifetime benefits.

== Table ==
The following table determines what bracket people under the Normal Retirement Age fall under spanning several years:

Year	Lower amount ($)	Upper amount ($)
2000	10,080	17,000
2001	10,680	25,000
2002	11,280	30,000
2003	11,520	30,720
2004	11,640	31,080
2005	12,000	31,800
2006	12,480	33,240
2007	12,960	34,440
2008	13,560	36,120
2009	14,160	37,680
2010	14,160	37,680
2011	14,160	37,680
2012	14,640	38,880
2013	15,120	40,080
2014	15,480	41,400
2015	15,720	41,880
