= Policy 713 =

Education policy in New Brunswick, Canada

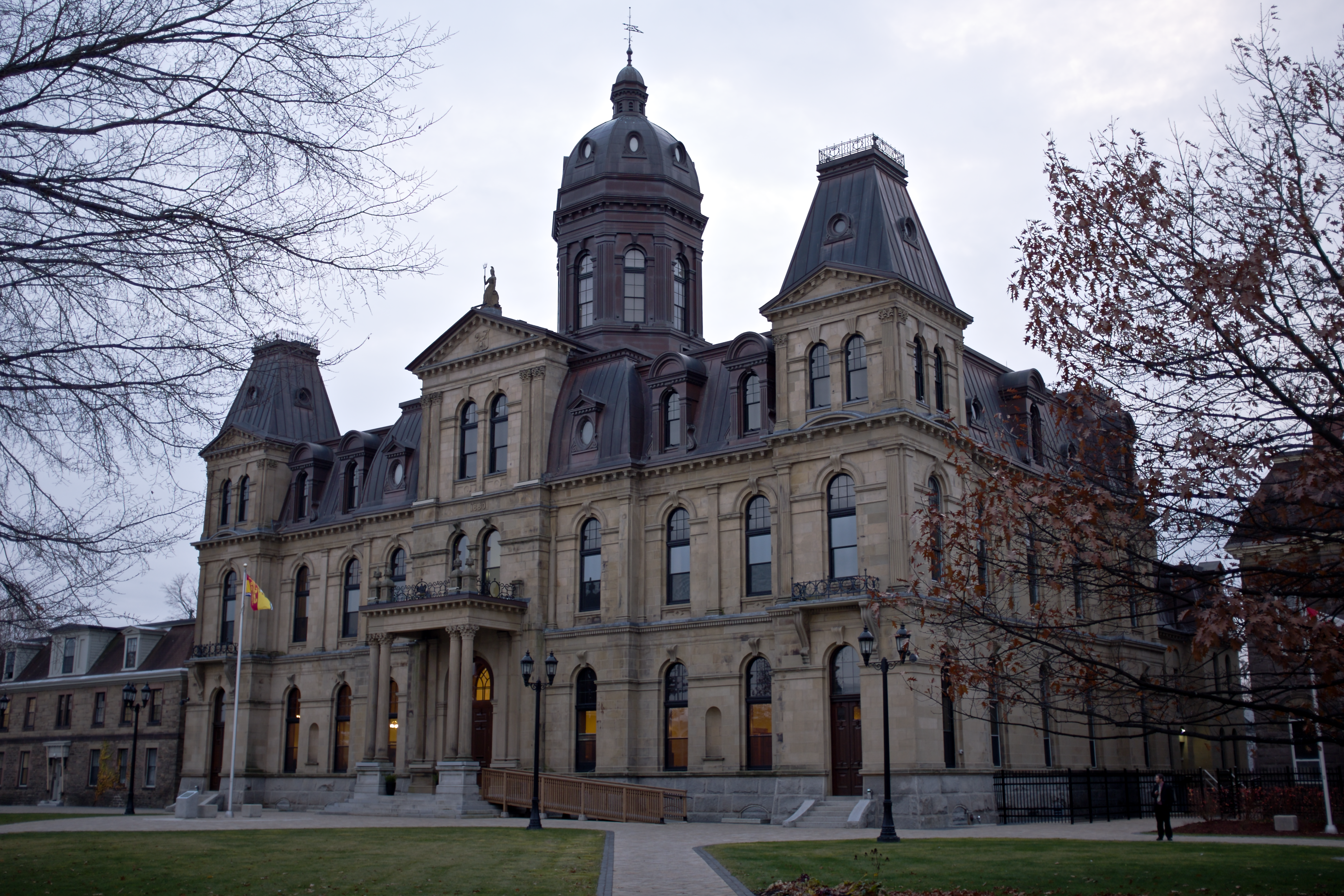

Legislative Assembly of New Brunswick
- Long title: Sexual Orientation and Gender Identity
- Citation: Policy 713 (original, 2020–2023); Policy 713 (revised, 2023–present)
- Territorial extent: New Brunswick, Canada
- Enacted: August 17, 2020
- Signed by: Dominic Cardy
- Administered by: Department of Education and Early Childhood Development

Summary
- Addresses support for LGBTQ students in public schools

Policy 713 (French: Politique 713), also called the Sexual Orientation and Gender Identity policy, is an education policy of the province of New Brunswick, Canada, that sets minimum requirements for public schools and districts in the province related to individuals identifying and perceived as LGBTQ.

The original policy, enacted in 2020 under the province's Department of Education and Early Childhood Development and signed by then-minister Dominic Cardy, required school personnel to use students' pronouns and chosen names. The policy also required schools to provide gender-neutral bathrooms; training opportunities for teachers about LGBTQ students; and support for Gender-Sexuality Alliance clubs, which could not require parental consent.

On April 21, 2023, Policy 713 was placed under review by the provincial government, led by New Brunswick’s premier, Blaine Higgs. After the government publicly announced in May that it would be reviewing the policy, it was criticized and protested by high school students and advocacy groups. The revised policy, released in June 2023, included changes that forbade New Brunswick teachers from using the preferred names and pronouns of students under the age of 16 without parental consent. Kelly Lamrock, the Child, Youth and Seniors' Advocate for New Brunswick, criticized the revised policy and stated it opened the province to legal risk. In response to the revision, the Canadian Civil Liberties Association (CCLA) filed a lawsuit against the provincial government, citing violations against the Canadian Charter of Rights and Freedoms and New Brunswick's human rights and education acts.

In the aftermath of Policy 713's revision, multiple Progressive Conservative politicians elected under Higgs, such as cabinet ministers and Members of the Legislative Assembly (MLAs), either resigned or publicly declared they would not seek re-election in 2024. Some of those who departed made comments criticizing Higgs' leadership, with some also highlighting a growing disconnect between their personal beliefs and the party's stance. The party was defeated by the Liberal's in the 2024 New Brunswick general election, with Higgs losing his own seat.

== Original version ==
The original version of Policy 713 was enacted on August 17, 2020, by the Department of Education and Early Childhood Development, aligning with the Canadian Charter of Rights and the New Brunswick Human Rights Act. It was signed by Dominic Cardy, the department's minister at the time, following development of the policy by the provincial government which started in 2018. As it was enacted, Policy 713 required school personnel in New Brunswick to use students' pronouns and chosen names without parental consent, required gender-neutral bathrooms in public schools, and required professional learning opportunities to be provided for school personnel so that the needs of LGBTQ students were recognized and supported. Policy 713 also instructed that the establishment of Gender-Sexuality Alliance clubs would be supported by school personnel and principals; parental consent was not a requirement to join these clubs, with the policy adding that "privacy and confidentiality will be respected".

== Review ==
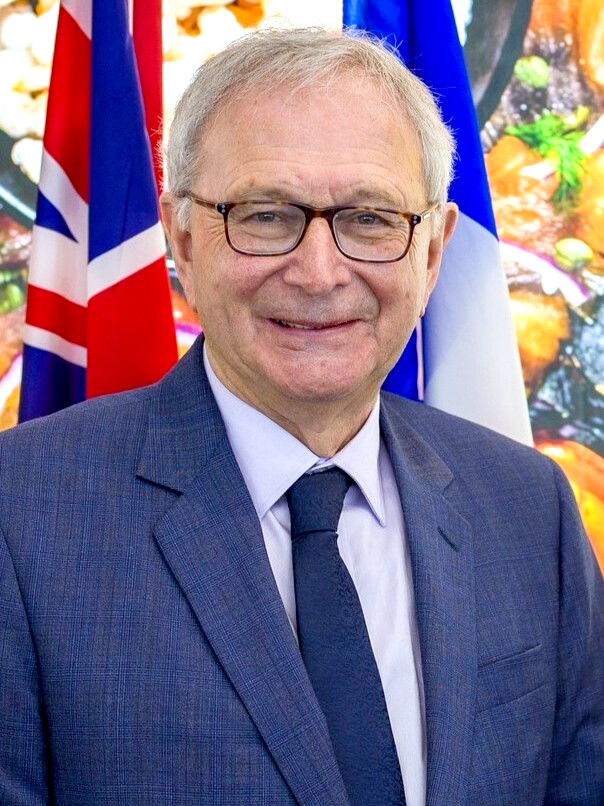
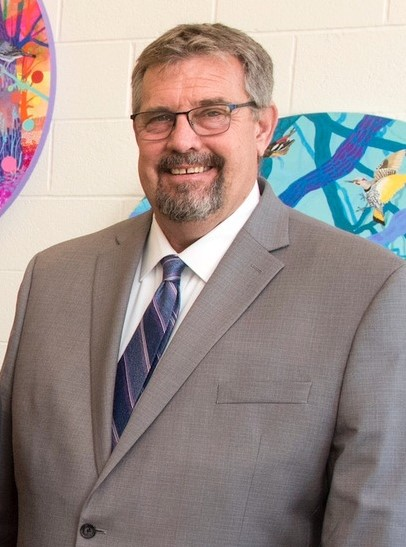
Premier Blaine Higgs (left) and Minister of Education and Early Childhood Development Bill Hogan (right)

On April 21, 2023, Policy 713 was officially placed under review following an internal email made one day prior, though it wasn't known to the public until May 2023 when the Department of Education and Early Childhood Development, then ministered by Bill Hogan, (Note: Cardy, the previous minister who signed the policy, resigned on October 13, 2022.) announced that it was putting the policy under review due to "concerns and misunderstandings of its implementation". The review was led by Premier Blaine Higgs and the provincial government.

On May 5, there was a sexual orientation and gender identity learning session for teachers. According to New Brunswick Teachers' Association president Connie Keating, protesters gathered at one of the session locations as a result of misinformation spread on social media. Among them were 15 to 20 protesters who carried signs displaying messages including "shame on teachers" and "perverts in education". Hogan denied any departmental involvement with the session and directed inquiries to the New Brunswick Teachers' Association.

Liberal MLA Francine Landry questioned the need for a policy so recently established to be put under review. Under questioning by the Liberal and Green parties in the legislature, Hogan initially did not give any reason for the review.

=== Claims of complaints ===
Hogan said there were "hundreds of complaints from parents and teachers" but did not provide evidence or details for the claim. Critics questioned the veracity of Hogan's claim of parent complaints. On May 16, New Brunswick Child, Youth and Seniors' Advocate Kelly Lamrock published a 21-page report stating that his office had discovered three complaints, zero being made by either teachers or students. Lamrock stated that he was only shown four emails by the department containing parent complaints: one from the father of a transgender child who "probably wanted the policy strengthened"; and three that, argued by Lamrock, "weren't credible and hardly enough support for undertaking a government policy review". One email said school curriculum was "falsely being labeled anti-racism but actually [...] very Marxist and racist Critical Race Theory"; another mentioned the litter boxes in schools hoax. In late July, a freedom of information request filed by a University of New Brunswick professor found that the province had received no written complaints from parents claiming they were not told about changes in their child's name or pronouns.

On May 16, Higgs argued that parents "have a right to know whether their children are using a different name or pronouns at school – even if they haven't come out to them as gay, lesbian or trans[gender]". During the policy review, Higgs additionally cited his concern regarding the fairness of transgender athletes, particularly those in women's hockey. In response, Andy Clark, president of the New Brunswick Interscholastic Athletic Association, said that no complaints had been made by any individual regarding fairness for cisgender students in the eight years since the implementation of a trans-inclusive policy.

== Revised version ==
On June 8, 2023, Hogan announced that the revised policy would become effective on July 1. His department updated three of the policy's sections: self-identification, sports participation and universal spaces, "to provide clarity and to respond to the feedback received during consultations." Under self-identification, two parts were adjusted. In Section 6.3.1, students ages 16 and above who identify as transgender or non-binary will engage in consultations with school officials, allowing for them to use their preferred name and pronouns. Section 6.3.2 adds that parental consent will be required for students under 16 to keep records of their preferred name, with further support being provided in cases where parental consent is inaccessible. The change forbade New Brunswick teachers from using students' preferred pronouns if they are under 16 years of age, without parental consent. Under sports participation, Section 6.1.5 was clarified to ensure that all students can "participate in curricular, co-curricular, and extracurricular activities that are safe and welcoming." Hogan reaffirmed the New Brunswick Interscholastic Athletic Association's role in overseeing provincial high school sports. The change removed mentions of allowing students to participate in extracurricular activities, including sports, that match their gender identity. Under universal spaces, Section 6.4.3 was added to establish the provision of private universal changing spaces within all schools.

In mid-June, legislators–including some Progressive Conservatives–successfully voted to refer the revised policy to Lamrock for review. On August 15, Lamrock's office released a report stating that the changes violated children's charter rights by forcing them to use a name they did not identify with, and that the Education Department had not seriously considered the legal implications. In a statement after the report's release, Lamrock said, "The parent does not have the right to a state apparatus to force the child to live by their values." Regarding only students over 16 years of age being able to self-identify in official school records, Lamrock approved the policy change. For students under 16 years of age, he said that schools should develop plans for younger students to informally change their names or pronouns.

On August 23, the provincial government announced that clarifications would be made to the policy; Hogan stated they "stand by the changes [...] made to Policy 713". The clarifications stated that parental consent was not needed for students to be called by their preferred names and pronouns by school professionals such as psychologists and social workers.

=== Legal proceedings ===
Shortly following the revision, the Canadian Civil Liberties Association (CCLA) threatened Higgs with a lawsuit, calling the revised policy "unlawful and unconstitutional". The CCLA stood by their previous statement following the clarification, and on September 6 filed a lawsuit against the provincial government of New Brunswick, requesting a court order to remove the policy's self-identification changes, as well as requesting a court declaration that the policy's revisions violate the Canadian Charter of Rights and Freedoms and New Brunswick's human rights and education acts.

In late 2023, eight groups applied to be an intervener in the case, including LGBTQ organizations such as Egale Canada, along with the New Brunswick Teachers' Federation, and the Canadian Union of Public Employees (2745), both trade unions. On May 1, 2024, Justice Richard Petrie granted intervener permission to Egale Canada, three local LGBTQ organizations, along with the Wabanaki Two-Spirit Alliance and Equality New Brunswick. Additionally, Our Duty Canada along with the Gender Dysphoria Alliance, two organizations in support of the revised policy, were also given intervener permission. Requests made by the unions were declined. On May 3, 2024, four organizations were permitted by Court of King's Bench Justice Richard G. Petrie to be "friends of the court" in the CCLA lawsuit:

- Madhu Verma Migrant Justice Centre
- New Brunswick Refugee Clinic (NBRC)
- Women's Legal Education and Action Fund (LEAF)
- Association for Reformed Political Action Canada (ARPA)

==== Anglophone East School District ====
In February 2024, Hogan gave the Anglophone East School District an ultimatum to either change their policy or else he'll do it himself. On April 2, 2024, the Anglophone East district council filed a lawsuit against the provincial government, alleging that Hogan threatened to dissolve councils that refuse to conform to his version of the policy.

On May 9, 2024, the New Brunswick cabinet approved the dissolution of the education council over gender identity policy. As of July 4, 2024, the minister had yet to file court filings to initiate the dissolution process.

== Reactions ==
=== Within New Brunswick ===
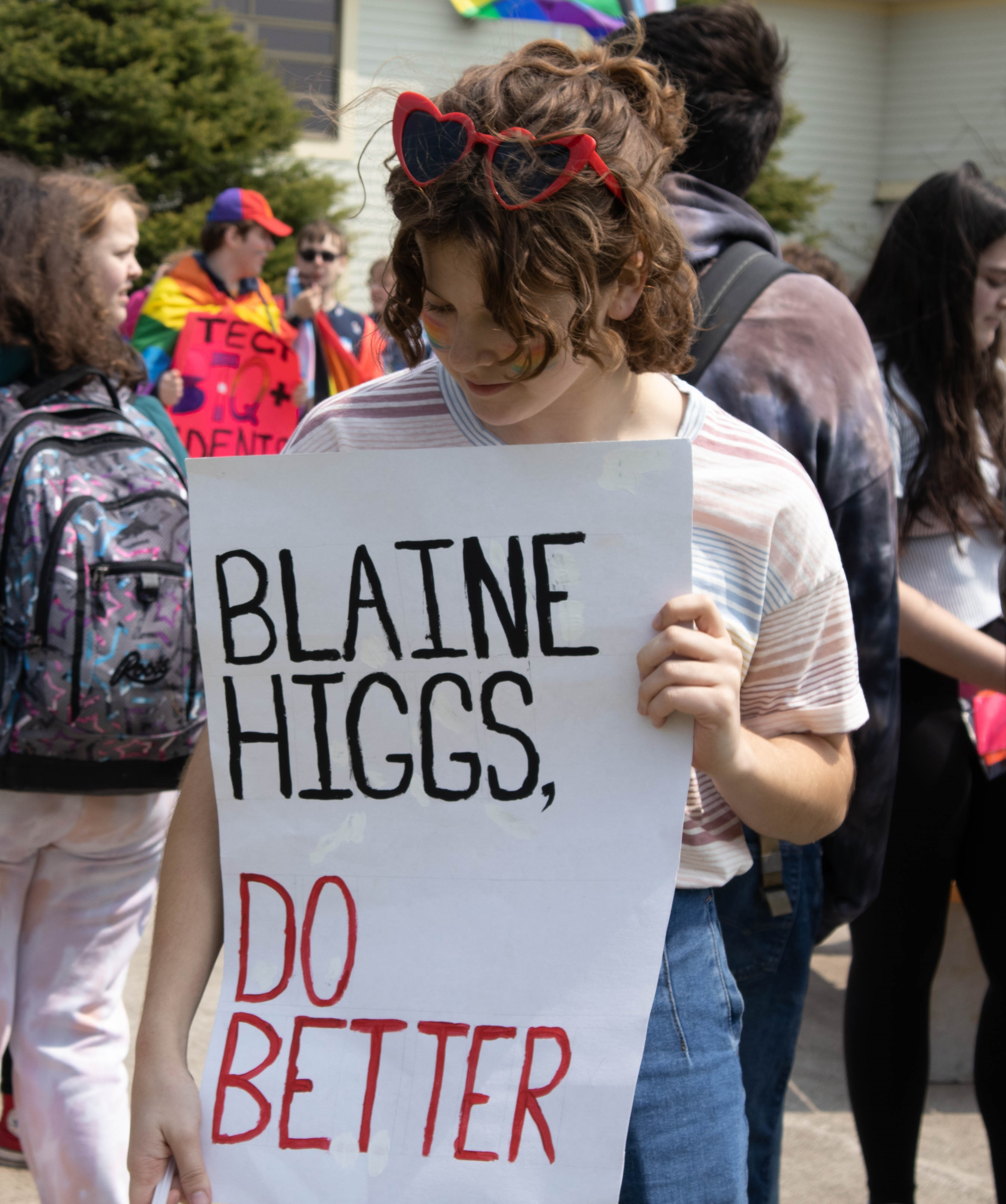
A student holds a sign reading "Blaine Higgs, do better" at a rally

Gail Costello of the New Brunswick Human Rights Commission criticized the review as "dangerous", stating that "the Education Department should not allow a small group of critics to dictate government decisions". Costello helped create the original policy.

Kristin Cavoukian, a member of the Anglophone East School District council, described it as a "bewildering announcement", drawing similarity to anti-LGBTQ initiatives in the United States. Former Minister of Education Dominic Cardy stated he believed that Higgs ordered the policy to be reviewed because he wanted to put restrictions on sex education. In a statement, 76 University of New Brunswick professors asked the government to revert the policy's changes. In response to the review, Green Party of New Brunswick leader David Coon said "schools must continue to be safe and affirming spaces". Rob Fowler, former chairman of the Anglophone South School District, opposed the review, expressing his belief that the education minister was "abandoning vulnerable students and staff".

==== Resignation and dismissals of cabinet ministers ====
Shortly following Policy 713's revision, two of Higgs's Progressive-Conservative cabinet ministers resigned: Dorothy Shephard, the former Minister of Social Development, and Trevor Holder, the former Minister of Post-Secondary Education, Training and Labour and the longest-serving Member of the Legislative Assembly of New Brunswick (MLA) in the legislature. Shephard, in subsequent media interviews, cited her frustration with Higgs's leadership approach as the reason for her resignation, with his management of the policy being the culmination of her frustrations. Holder, through a letter statement, expressed his need for “some significant soul searching after a 24-year legislative career.” Reflecting on his cabinet service under three premiers, Holder mentioned his historical commitment to fighting for "constituents within a party and caucus structure." Noting a recent shift while under Higgs's leadership, he described the caucus as "less about consensus and more about him getting his own way."

Two additional cabinet ministers who served under Higgs, Daniel Allain and Jeff Carr, expressed their “extreme disappointment in a lack of process and transparency” in a jointly signed letter following the revision. On June 27, 2023, Higgs dismissed both Allain and Carr from their from their respective cabinet minister positions, citing a breach of cabinet solidarity due to their support for the opposition motion on the policy. Allain, the former Minister of Local Government and Local Governance Reform, and Carr, the former Minister of Transportation and Infrastructure, as well as resigned ministers Shephard and Holder, all voted with the opposition parties on June 15 which favoured a Liberal motion opposing the policy revision and called for increased consultation on the policy. Allain and Carr were both relegated to backbencher positions, and new ministers were appointed to fill their cabinet roles. In an interview with CBC News, Carr, who remained a Progressive-Conservative MLA, expressed his disagreement with Higgs's leadership style.

Throughout early 2024, multiple Progressive Conservative politicians such as Arlene Dunn, Mike Holland, Carr, Allain, Shephard as well as Holder all made announcements either resigning or opting out of running for re-election. Carr, who made his announcement in February, made an additional note claiming that the Progressive Conservative party had changed under Higgs. In March 2024, Holder announced that he would be resigning his legislative seat "before May". The following month, Minister of Environment and Climate Change and Hampton MLA Gary Crossman announced that he would be leaving the Legislative Assembly "within days," stating that his "personal and political beliefs no longer align in many ways with the direction of our party and government." Crossman previously announced that he would be retiring after his term, which would have ended following the next provincial election in October 2024. Both Holder and Crossman resigned on April 30, 2024. Holland resigned on June 20, 2024; he previously had announced his intentions to not run again.

=== Outside of New Brunswick ===
On June 8, during a pride event in Toronto, Prime Minister Justin Trudeau publicly condemned the Higgs government's changes to the policy, saying "trans kids need to feel safe, not targeted by politicians". In response, opposition leader Pierre Poilievre said, "The prime minister has no business in decisions that should rest with provinces and parents", calling the issue a "provincial policy."

Action4Canada, Christian conservative group based in British Columbia, called the review a "heroic decision" and a test case. Ontario's education minister Stephen Lecce stated his belief that "parents should know if their children choose to change their name or pronouns at school".

In May 2023, conservative think tank SecondStreet.org and Léger conducted a survey of 1,523 Canadians, finding that 57% of Canadians believed that schools should be obligated to tell parents about their child's intentions to change their gender or pronouns; 18% disagreed. In a July 2023 survey conducted by Research Co. among 1,000 Canadians, 49% expressed support for the notion that teachers should be required to use the preferred names or pronouns of 16-year and below-aged students without parental notification. An August 2023 Angus Reid poll found that, out of 3,016 Canadian adults who are members of the Angus Reid Forum, 78% said that parents need to always be informed by the school if a child wants to change their pronouns or gender, while 43% said that parents must also give consent to the change; 14% said that parents should have no role in the decision. Support for mandatory parental consent differs considerably between supporters of different parties, being highest with CPC voters and lowest with NDP voters.

=== Protests ===
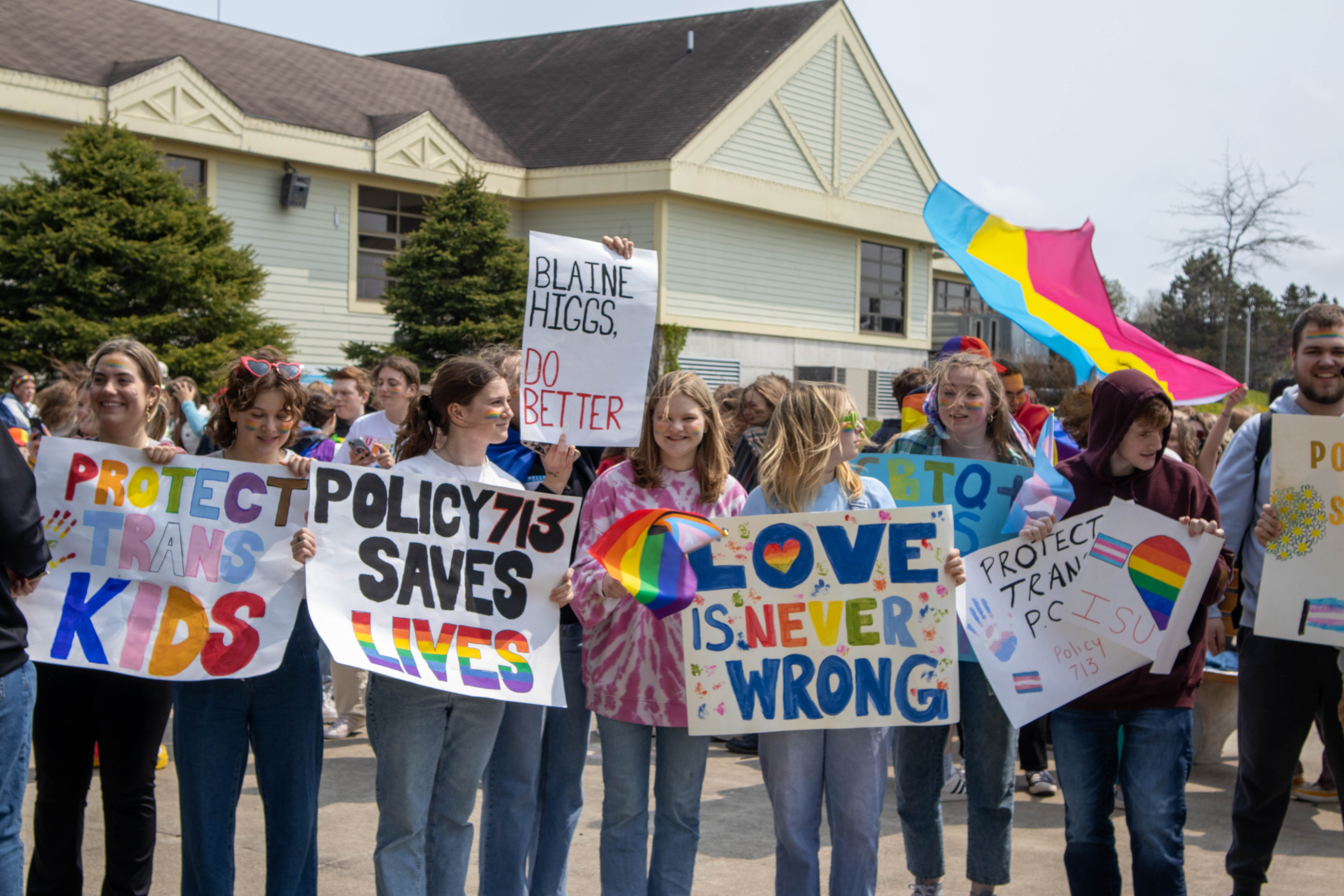
Students holding signs at a rally at the Quispamsis Town Hall

Following the announcement of the review, protests and rallies were carried out by students and advocates, such as through student-led walkouts. Additionally, multiple school district councils implemented their own policies to reverse the policy's changes. Following pressure from the education minister, some school districts reached an agreement on their policy revisions, while other districts, such as Anglophone East and Francophone Sud, stood firm with their own versions.

On May 13, 2023, about 350 protestors gathered at a rally at the New Brunswick legislature. Additional rallies were organized by high school students, the first of which took place on May 15 at King's Square in the city of Saint John. Hundreds of attendees, mostly students from the Saint John, Harbour View, St. Malachy's Memorial, and Simonds high schools, gathered to protest the review. On May 17, another protest was held by about 60 Riverview High School students. On May 19, hundreds of students from Kennebecasis Valley High School and Rothesay High School staged a walkout and rally at the Quispamsis town hall. A small rally was also held in Sackville on June 16.

== Similar legislation ==
Following the change to Policy 713 in New Brunswick, Saskatchewan's Saskatchewan Party government followed suit in August 2023 and implemented a similar policy in its schools, which also required parental consent for students under 16 to change their preferred name or pronouns. When the province's initial policy was challenged in court, affidavits revealed that the provincial government had received eighteen letters in the spring and summer of 2023 encouraging the development of such a policy, with sixteen of the letters directly referencing New Brunswick's Policy 713. After a court injunction was granted against Saskatchewan's policy, Premier Scott Moe pledged to enshrine the legislation in law and to invoke the notwithstanding clause to protect it from legal challenges. The provincial government passed the Parents' Bill of Rights on October 20, 2023.

Heather Stefanson, Manitoba's Premier and Progressive Conservative leader, pledged in September 2023 to "formalize and enhance rights for parents and guardians" if re-elected as premier, after previously stating that "parents know what is in the best interest of their children". While Stefanson was re-elected to her seat in the Legislative Assembly of Manitoba that October, her party lost the 2023 provincial election.

In January 2024, Alberta Premier Danielle Smith announced plans that will require parental consent when students under 15 years old wish to change their gender pronouns (one year lower than New Brunswick and Saskatchewan's age limit).

== See also ==
- Education and the LGBTQ community
- Saskatchewan Parents' Bill of Rights
- Florida Parental Rights in Education Act
- Parental rights movement
- School Success and Opportunity Act
