= Florida Parental Rights in Education Act =

Florida statute commonly known as the "Don't Say Gay" bill

Parental Rights in Education

Florida Legislature
- Long title: An act relating to parental rights in education; amending s. 1001.42, F.S.; requiring district school boards to adopt procedures that comport with certain provisions of law for notifying a student's parent of specified information; requiring such procedures to reinforce the fundamental right of parents to make decisions regarding the upbringing and control of their children in a specified manner; prohibiting the procedures from prohibiting a parent from accessing certain records; providing construction; prohibiting a school district from adopting procedures or student support forms that prohibit school district personnel from notifying a parent about specified information or that encourage or have the effect of encouraging a student to withhold from a parent such information; prohibiting school district personnel from discouraging or prohibiting parental notification and involvement in critical decisions affecting a student's mental, emotional, or physical well-being; providing construction; prohibiting classroom discussion about sexual orientation or gender identity in certain grade levels or in a specified manner; requiring certain training developed or provided by a school district to adhere to standards established by the Department of Education; requiring school districts to notify parents of healthcare services and provide parents the opportunity to consent or decline such services; providing that a specified parental consent does not wave certain parental rights; requiring school districts to provide parents with certain questionnaires or health screening forms and obtain parental permission before administering such questionnaires and forms; requiring school districts to adopt certain procedures for resolving specified parental concerns; requiring resolution within a specified timeframe; requiring the Commissioner of Education to appoint a special magistrate for unresolved concerns; providing requirements for the special magistrate; requiring the State Board of Education to approve or reject the special magistrate's recommendation within specified timeframe; requiring school districts to bear the costs of the special magistrate; requiring the State Board of Education to adopt rules; providing requirements for such rules; authorizing a parent to bring an action against a school district to obtain a declaratory judgment that a school district procedure or practice violates certain provisions of law; providing for the additional award of injunctive relief, damages, and reasonable attorney fees and court costs to certain parents; requiring school district to adopt policies to notify parents of certain rights; providing construction; requiring the department to review and update, as necessary, specified materials by a certain date; providing an effective date.
- Citation: House Bill 1557
- Enacted by: Florida House of Representatives
- Enacted by: Florida Senate
- Signed by: Ron DeSantis
- Signed: March 28, 2022
- Commenced: July 1, 2022

Legislative history

Initiating chamber: Florida House of Representatives
- Introduced by: Joe Harding
- Passed: February 24, 2022
- Voting summary: 69 Florida Representatives (68 Republicans and 1 Democrat) voted for; 47 Florida Representatives (40 Democrats and 7 Republicans) voted against

Revising chamber: Florida Senate
- Member(s) in charge: Dennis Baxley
- Passed: March 8, 2022
- Voting summary: 22 Florida Senators (22 Republicans) voted for; 17 Florida Senators (15 Democrats and 2 Republicans) voted against
- Status: In force

The Parental Rights in Education Act (HB 1557), commonly referred to as the "Don't Say Gay" law, is a Florida statute passed in 2022 that regulates public schools in Florida. The law is most notable for prohibiting public schools from having "classroom discussion", or giving "classroom instruction", (Note: The preamble to the act uses the phrase "classroom discussion". The relevant numbered section of the act uses the phrase "classroom instruction".) about sexual orientation or gender identity from kindergarten through third grade or in a manner deemed to be against state standards in all grades. It also requires that schools disclose to parents if their children have received mental health services via the school.

The legislation was introduced in the Florida House of Representatives by Representatives Joe Harding and Dennis Baxley, and passed the chamber with 68 Republicans and 1 Democrat (James Bush III) voting for it, and 40 Democrats and 7 Republicans voting against it. The Florida Senate passed the bill with 22 Republicans voting for it, and 15 Democrats and 2 Republicans voting against it. Florida governor Ron DeSantis signed the bill on March 28, 2022, and the act went into effect on July 1 of that year as part of Florida Statute §1001.42. Its passage has prompted the introduction of various similar laws within other states and the federal government, and Florida legislators have introduced bills expanding the scope of the law. The Florida Board of Education later expanded the ban on teaching about sexual orientation or gender identity to all grades K-12 in April 2023, with the exception of health or reproductive courses.

The bill received support from Republican politicians and conservative organizations. The bill also received widespread backlash, especially from students, who demonstrated against the act throughout Florida by holding walkouts across middle and high schools. Additional organizations who have issued statements against the act include those representing teachers, (Note: Represented by the American Federation of Teachers, the National Education Association, and the Florida Education Association.) pediatricians, (Note: Represented by the Florida Chapter of the American Academy of Pediatrics.) psychologists, (Note: Represented by the American Psychological Association.) and hundreds of major corporations. The Walt Disney Company opposed the legislation after protests by its employees, leading to a feud between Disney and DeSantis that culminated in the renaming of the Reedy Creek Improvement District and transfer of the power to appoint its board from Disney to the governor of Florida. Conflicting polls have shown public support or public opposition to the act, with support being higher among older generations and opposition being higher among younger generations.

Multiple lawsuits were filed against the act with the support of advocacy groups representing parents and families of LGBT+ children. In March 2024 the groups settled with the state, which clarified that the law only restricts the direct teaching of gender identity and sexual orientation in classrooms, while the law allows books and discussions about the LGBT community and LGBT rights between students and teachers.

== Etymology ==
The act is officially titled the Parental Rights in Education Act and is described as "An act relating to parental rights in education" in the act itself. It is more commonly known as Don't Say Gay, as it has been described in headlines by the prominent news agency, the Associated Press; prominent domestic newspapers such as The New York Times, The Washington Post, and the Los Angeles Times; prominent domestic news media including ABC, CNN, and Fox News affiliates; and prominent news media in other Anglosphere countries including ABC (Australia), the BBC, and CBC.

It is also known as Don't Say Gay or Trans, as it has been described in statements by the main nationwide organization for LGBT rights in the United States, the Human Rights Campaign; the main statewide organization for LGBT rights in Florida, Equality Florida; and the United Nations official for LGBT rights at the United Nations, the United Nations Independent Expert on Protection against violence and discrimination based on sexual orientation and gender identity.

== Provisions ==
The Parental Rights in Education Act does not contain the term "gay", although the terms "sexual orientation" and "gender identity" are both referred to twice within the legislation. The legislative provisions on prohibiting education on sexual orientation or gender identity restrict classroom discussion or classroom instruction instigated by third parties and school personnel, such as teachers and principals. Classroom discussion or classroom instruction on sexual orientation or gender identity is prohibited from kindergarten to third grade, and can be restricted from 4th to 12th grade to what the state deems to be either "age appropriate" or "developmentally appropriate". The bill additionally requires schools to disclose to parents whether a child has received mental health services through the school. The legislation phrases the provision as parents not being able to be "blocked" by the school from accessing related documents. The legislation enables parents to file legal challenges against school teachings they have personal objections to. Moreover, all lawsuits filed against schools by parents under the act must be paid for by the sued school or district.

== Debate ==
=== Support ===
==== Politicians ====
The most prominent supporters of the act are several Republicans in Florida: Florida Governor Ron DeSantis, who signed the bill; Florida Senator Dennis Baxley, who filed the bill in the Florida Senate; former Florida Representative Joe Harding, who filed the bill in the Florida House of Representatives; Christina Pushaw, who served as press secretary to DeSantis at the time of the passage of the bill; and Florida Senator Ileana Garcia, who gave a controversial speech in support of the bill. DeSantis said that education for children about gender identity "is trying to sow doubt in kids about their gender identity" and that such education is "trying to say that they can be whatever they want to be".

Baxley rhetorically asked, "Why is everybody now all about coming out when you're at school?" and said that there are "kids trying on different kinds of things they hear about and different kinds of identities and experimenting. That's what kids do." Garcia said that "gay is not a permanent thing, LGBT is not a permanent thing", a statement directly contrary to scientific evidence that sexual orientation and gender identity are not choices and cannot be changed. Garcia later apologized.

Pushaw said that "The bill that liberals inaccurately call 'Don't Say Gay' would be more accurately described as an Anti-Grooming Bill", and said that "If you're against the Anti-Grooming bill, you are probably a groomer or at least you don't denounce the grooming of 4–8-year-old children", reflecting the anti-LGBT conspiracy theory that people who educate children about the LGBT community, LGBT history, LGBT rights, and same-sex marriage are practicing a form of child grooming, contrary to scientific research by experts in child development and psychology that indicate that the aforementioned education has a positive effect on children.

The law attracted statements of support from many of the state's representatives in the federal government and figures outside of Florida state politics. Tulsi Gabbard, a former Democrat and representative from Hawaii, argued that the act should go further and cover not only kindergarten through to third grade, but all grades through to twelfth grade. Former president Donald Trump agreed with DeSantis signing the bill, calling it "a good move" in an interview with The Washington Post, though he reportedly declined to elaborate. Ten Republican members of the US House of Representatives from Florida joined Senator Marco Rubio in saying that the act helped to keep classes age appropriate, believing that kids as young as five should not have to worry about their gender identity.

==== Organizations and other individuals ====
The Florida state chapter of the conservative advocacy group Moms for Liberty supported the act as an advancement of their wishes to increase parental rights over schools. The Pinellas County subchapter's president, Angela Dubach, has called for the law to be expanded to include middle schools up to eighth grade as well. The National Review also came out in support, releasing an op-ed written by Madeline Kearns. In her editorial, Kearns claims that parental access to school medical and behavioral records on their respective children is "a no-brainer", terminology she used to also describe the prohibition on parents being restricted access from "critical decisions affecting a student's mental, emotional, or physical health or well-being".

=== Opposition ===
Students have been among the most prominently visible demonstrators against the act. Additional organizations which have notably supported lawsuits against the act or issued statements condemning the legislation include Family Equality Council, the American Federation of Teachers, the National Education Association, the Florida Education Association, the American Academy of Pediatrics, the American Psychological Association, the Human Rights Campaign, Equality Florida, Human Rights Watch, the United Nations Human Rights Council through United Nations Independent Expert on Protection against violence and discrimination based on sexual orientation and gender identity, the American Bar Association, and 296 major businesses, including, most notably and most prominently, The Walt Disney Company.

==== Students ====
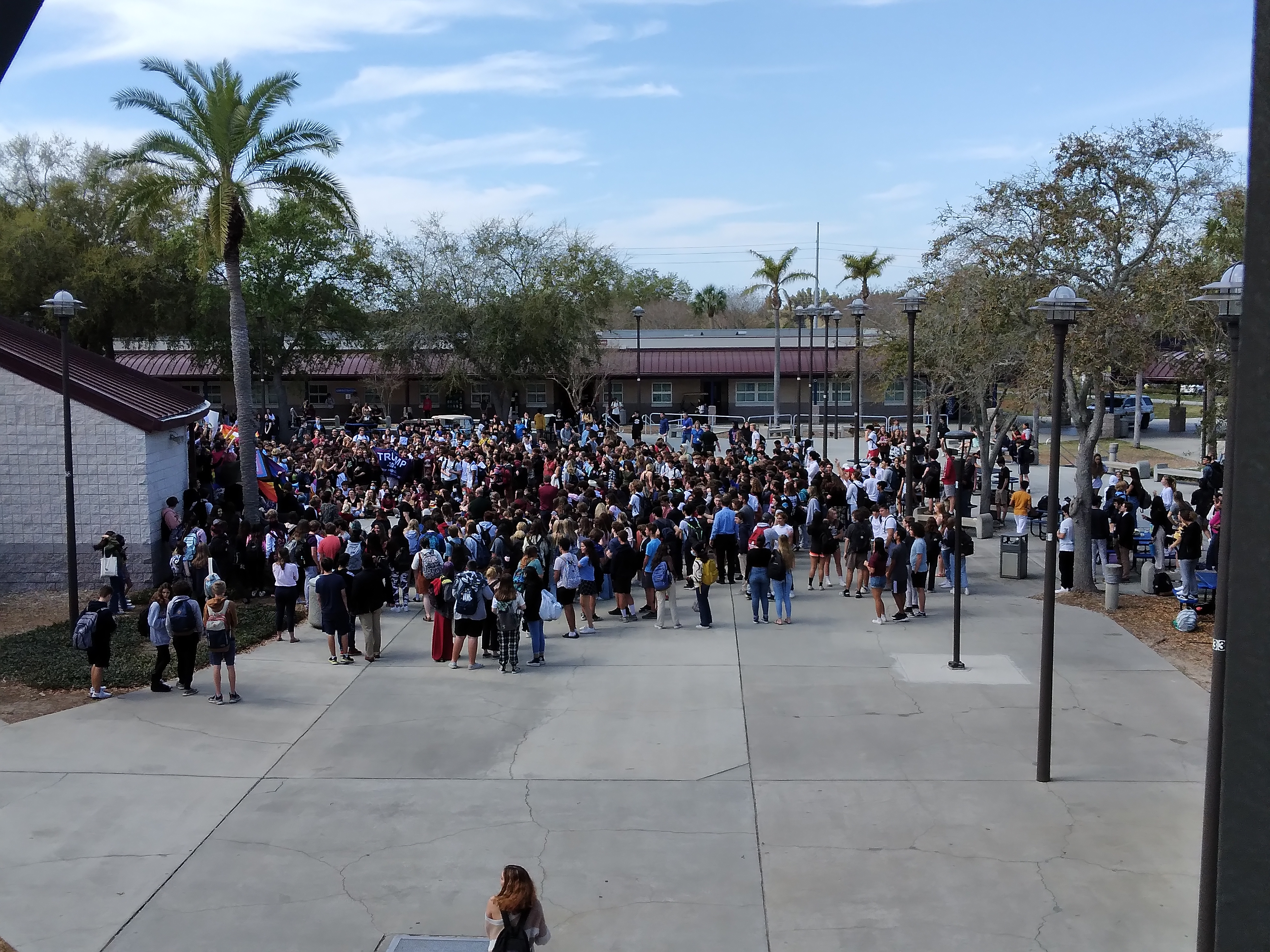
A student protest at Palm Harbor University High School against the legislation

Massive walkouts were carried out by students in middle schools and high schools across Florida and throughout the United States in opposition to what they described as the Don't Say Gay bill, with large crowds of middle schoolers and high schoolers chanting "We Say Gay", "Gay Lives Matter", "We Fight For Gay Rights", and "Hey Hey, Ho Ho, Homophobes Have Got To Go" in response.

==== Human rights groups ====
Some organizations have argued that the act is unconstitutional. The Family Equality Council stated that the act attempts to "erase for an entire generation of Florida public school students" education about the LGBT community, LGBT history, LGBT rights, and same-sex marriage; and stated that the act violates the First and Fourth Amendments "by discriminatorily censoring classroom instruction about sexual orientation or gender identity in Florida public schools".

The Human Rights Campaign, Equality Florida, and Human Rights Watch oppose the act; they say that it harms LGBT children in Florida's public schools. Joni Madison, the Interim President of the Human Rights Campaign at the time of the passage of the bill, in response to the signing of the bill by Florida Governor Ron DeSantis, stated that "Governor DeSantis once again placed Florida squarely on the wrong side of history, and placed his own young constituents directly in harm's way". Nadine Smith, executive director of Equality Florida, in response to the signing of the bill by Florida Governor Ron DeSantis, stated that "Governor Ron DeSantis signed the 'Don't Say Gay' bill in the most cowardly way possible today. He hid his agenda from the media and the public until the last moment, skulking onto a charter school campus that is exempt from the law and away from students who would protest his presence. He has attacked parents and children in our state". Ryan Thoreson, a Specialist at the Lesbian, Gay, Bisexual, and Transgender Rights Program at Human Rights Watch, stated that the act would "chill open discussions and support for lesbian, gay, bisexual, and transgender (LGBT) students".

==== Non-advocacy organizations ====
The most common organizational argument against the Act is that the provisions harm LGBT children within Florida's public schools. These arguments were amplified by educational organizations, such as the American Federation of Teachers, the National Education Association, and the Florida Education Association. Randi Weingarten, the President of the American Federation of Teachers, stated that the act would "single out certain kids and families for derision and denigration. It is just wrong. Its intent is to divide our communities". Becky Pringle, the President of the National Education Association, and Andrew Spar, the President of the Florida Education Association, further built off of Weingarten's comments, with Pringle stating that the "deeply disturbing legislation aims to censor educators" and prevent them from supporting their students' gender identity", and Spar stating the legislation endangers the self-esteem and security of students based on their identity.

Pediatric and psychological organizations also have opposed the act on the grounds that the legislation harms LGBT children. The American Academy of Pediatrics and the American Psychological Association have each issued statements through their respective presidents of either the national organization or the state chapters condemning the law. Lisa Gwynn, the President of the Florida Chapter of the American Academy of Pediatrics at the time of the passage of bill, stated that "The 'Don't Say Gay' bill will harm Florida's children in the classroom and beyond". Frank C. Worrell, PhD, the President of the American Psychological Association at the time of the passage of the bill, stated that the act is "stigmatizing and marginalizing children" and that the act "sends a damaging message to impressionable young people at a critical time in their development". These groups were further joined by the American Bar Association, which states through then-president Reginald Turner the law and derivative legislation like it fosters "a hostile culture beset by bullying and physical violence" against LGBT children at school. Luke P. Norris, a law professor writing in the Virginia Law Review, said that the proliferation of private-enforcement statutes like the Florida bill could lead to consequences such as a growing rift in cultural and political spheres regarding matters of profound moral discourse, adding that "The spaces members of the public share—healthcare facilities, schools, shopping centers, roadways, and even voting stations—may become freighted, charged spaces, where people are suspicious that fellow members of the public will wield the power of the state and bring the weight of the law to bear on their activities."

Officials within the US Federal government and the United Nations Human Rights Council have additionally subscribed to the argument that the act harms children, as well as LGBT educators and families. The Department of Education through secretary Miguel Cardona stated that the bill would enable further bullying and discrimination against LGBT students. Moreover, White House Press Secretary Karine Jean-Pierre and President Joe Biden's administration have blasted the bill for reducing the freedoms of some of Florida's "most vulnerable" families and students. For similar reasons to Cardona, the UNHRC through independent expert Victor Madrigal-Borloz has further criticized the bill and the laws which take to replicate it in other jurisdictions.

==== Corporate opponents ====
321 major businesses oppose the act and other similar acts that have been passed or proposed which these businesses view as restricting the rights of LGBT people, harming LGBT children and LGBT families as well as LGBT people who are their employees and customers. The major businesses noted in a statement that the acts target LGBT children "for exclusion or differential treatment", that the acts "would harm our team members and their families, stripping them of opportunities and making them feel unwelcome and at risk in their own communities. As such, it can be exceedingly difficult for us to recruit the most qualified candidates for jobs in states" that have passed such acts, and that the acts "have a negative effect on our employees, our customers, our competitiveness, and state and national economies". Some of the companies or North American divisions of companies which signed the letter include but are not limited to most major American media conglomerates (including the holding companies for NBC, ABC, and CBS), large technology companies like Apple and Google, the oil giant Shell, automakers General Motors and Toyota, large banks such as Wells Fargo and HSBC, transportation companies like American Airlines and Union Pacific Railroad, retailers PetSmart and CVS, and healthcare firms AstraZeneca and Cardinal Health.

The Walt Disney Company has become the most prominent corporate opponent to the legislation, arguing similarly to most other organizations that the legislation harms LGBT children. Bob Chapek, then-CEO of Disney, stated that the act "could be used to unfairly target gay, lesbian, non-binary and transgender kids and families". Chapek's successor and predecessor, Bob Iger, also joined calls against the bill, commenting that as opposed to being a political matter, the bill to Iger was about "what is right and what is wrong, and that just seemed wrong. It seemed potentially harmful to kids".

== Legislative history ==
Florida Senator Dennis Baxley filed Senate Bill 1834, Parental Rights in Education, in the Florida Senate on January 7, 2022, but it died in the Florida Senate Appropriations Committee. Former Florida Representative Joe Harding filed House Bill 1557, Parental Rights in Education, in the Florida House of Representatives on January 11, 2022; this version eventually became the version passed and signed. The Florida House of Representatives passed the bill on February 24, 2022, in a 69 to 47 vote; with 68 Republicans and 1 Democrat voting for it; and 40 Democrats and 7 Republicans voting against it. The 1 Democrat who voted for it was James Bush; and the 7 Republicans who voted against were Vance Aloupis, Demi Busatta Cabrera, Chip LaMarca, Amber Mariano, Jim Mooney, Rene Plasencia, and Will Robinson. The Florida Senate passed the bill on March 8, 2022, in a 22 to 17 vote; with 22 Republicans voting for it; and 15 Democrats and 2 Republicans voting against it. The 2 Republicans who voted against it were Jeff Brandes and Jennifer Bradley. Florida Governor Ron DeSantis signed the bill on March 28, 2022, and the act went into effect on July 1, 2022.

== Polling ==
Polls have variously shown plurality or majority opposition to the act or support for the act; results vary depending on the population being sampled, the wording of the poll, and the polling firm that conducted the poll. Polls have consistently shown that support for the act is concentrated among older generations, while opposition to the act is concentrated among younger generations.

- A Ipsos poll found that 62% of Americans oppose legislation prohibiting classroom lessons about sexual orientation and gender identity in elementary schools and 37% support such legislation.
- A University of Florida poll found that 49% of Florida voters oppose the act and 40% support it.
- A Morning Consult poll found that 50% of American registered voters support the act and 34% oppose it.
- A Siena College Research Institute poll found that 50% of Florida likely voters oppose the act and 44% support it.

== Aftermath ==
In April 2023, the Florida Board of Education expanded the ban on teaching about sexual orientation or gender identity, with the exception of health or reproductive courses, to all grades K–12.

=== The Walt Disney Company ===
Employees at The Walt Disney Company planned walkouts over the bill, which culminated in a large protest. The company and CEO Bob Chapek (despite earlier maintaining no stance), as well as Disney heir Charlee Corra, all decided to publicly oppose the bill, with Corra also using the moment to come out as transgender. The company received heavy criticism from DeSantis and many conservative media outlets for its opposition to the bill, and DeSantis eventually helped pass legislation in Florida which reformed the Reedy Creek Improvement District, which contains Walt Disney World, into the Central Florida Tourism Oversight District. This move was scrutinized by former Vice President Mike Pence, who said DeSantis was going too far. In 2023, a post on Twitter claimed that a teacher in Florida was under investigation for showing her students the Disney movie Strange World and included a photo of a letter reportedly from the Florida Department of Education. The movie includes an openly gay character, which led to a parent submitting a complaint about it, according to the Twitter user.

=== Lawsuits ===
On July 26, 2022, Florida high school student Will Larkins and the national LGBT+ organization CenterLink, through the Southern Poverty Law Center, Southern Legal Counsel, and Lambda Legal, filed suit against four Florida school districts' boards (those of the Orange County Public Schools, the School District of Palm Beach County, the School District of Indian River County, and the Duval County Public Schools), saying the law's "vigilante enforcement mechanism", combined with its "intentionally vague and sweeping scope, invites parents who oppose any acknowledgement whatsoever of the existence of LGBTQ+ people to sue, resulting in schools acting aggressively to silence students, parents, and school personnel". A representative for Duval County stated that the school administration "will always take steps necessary to comply with Florida laws". In October 2022, federal judge Wendy Berger dismissed the suit for lack of standing, which challenged the legislation effective since July 1. She gave the plaintiffs 14 days to file a revised lawsuit.

On March 31, 2022, a lawsuit was filed in federal court by law firm Kaplan Hecker and Fink, the National Center for Lesbian Rights, and public attorney Elizabeth F. Schwartz on behalf of Equality Florida and Family Equality, which sought to block the bill on the grounds that it was unconstitutional. The lawsuit alleged that the bill violates the constitutionally protected rights of free speech, equal protection and due process of students and families, and argued that the bill was an effort to "control young minds" which prevented students from living "their true identities in school". The suit was dismissed in February 2023 for lack of subject-matter jurisdiction. The groups appealed to the Eleventh Circuit before settling with the state in March 2024 to restrict the law to only cover the direct teaching of gender identity and sexual orientation in classrooms. The settlement applies to K–12 students, as the Florida Board of Education had by then turned the bans into state policy applying through Grade 12. The settlement clarifies the law does not prohibit:

- LGBT-themed books in libraries and book fairs if they are not used for instruction
- Students, parents, and teachers disclosing their sexual orientation
- Discussion of LGBT issues outside of formal instruction
- "Literary references" to LGBT people in classroom materials
- Inclusion of LGBT people in classroom discussions and student academic work
- Teachers displaying a photo of a same-sex or transgender partner
- Anti-bullying lessons
- "Safe space" signs for LGBT people
- LGBT references and characters in musicals and plays
- Gender non-conforming clothing and similar personal expressions
- Student groups like gay-straight alliances
- Dancing with a person of the same gender

The law still prohibits teaching that any one sexual orientation or gender identity is better than any other.

=== New York City ===
In response to the passage of the act, New York City mayor Eric Adams launched an eight-week advertising campaign in five major Florida cities denouncing the act, while celebrating the level of LGBT acceptance in NYC. Adams said the funds for the campaign were provided by advertising firm Kinetic, not sourced from taxpayers.

=== Subsequent Florida bills ===
==== HB 1069 ====
House Bill 1069, Education, was filed on February 22, 2023, by Republican state representative Stan McClain. Seen as an extension of the Parental Rights in Education act, the bill would allow only grades 6–12 in public schools to receive sex education and would require these classes to teach that "sex is determined by biology and reproductive function at birth" and that reproductive gender roles are "binary, stable, and unchangeable". Both chambers of the Florida state legislature passed the bill, with the state Senate passing it by a margin of 27–12 and the state House of Representatives by a margin of 77–35. In the senate, the bill was sponsored by Republican senator Clay Yarborough. DeSantis endorsed the bill and signed it into law in May 2023. Democrats opposed the bill, characterizing it as not only discriminating against LGBT+ people but also enabling book banning.

==== HB 1223 ====
House Bill 1223, Public PreK-12 Educational Institution and Instruction Requirements, was filed on February 28, 2023, by Republican state representative Adam Anderson. The bill was seen as an expansion of the Parental Rights in Education act, and includes a variety of measures, including an extension of the prohibition to eighth grade, enacting a statewide definition of "sex" as "the binary division of individuals based upon reproductive function" and "an immutable biological trait", and prohibiting schools from requiring people to use a pronoun or title for someone if it does not correspond to the person's assigned sex at birth. The bill died in committee on May 5, 2023.

==== SB 1320 ====
Senate Bill 1320, Child Protection in Public Schools, was filed on March 1, 2023, by Yarborough. The senate bill contains many of the same provisions as house bills 1223 and 1069, and also restricts school employees from sharing their pronouns and asking students about their pronouns. It would also prohibit teaching about sexual orientation or gender identity from pre-kindergarten through the eighth grade. DeSantis made comments supporting the bill, signaling that if it passed the legislature, he would likely sign it.

=== Other non-Floridian bills ===
==== Federal bills ====
Republican Representative Mike Johnson of Louisiana introduced the Stop the Sexualization of Children Act, a version of the bill in the US House of Representatives which has gained 32 Republican cosponsors. The bill is argued by its critics to not only replicate but go further than the Parental Rights in Education Act, as it would prohibit LGBTQ material in all federal facilities, prohibit drag performances in all federally-funded institutions, and similar to the Texas Heartbeat Act, include a private right of action clause enabling parents and guardians to sue institutions which hold such performances.

==== State bills ====
At least 20 states have had their legislatures introduce derivative bills of the Parental Rights in Education Act, including Arizona, Georgia, Iowa, Kentucky, Louisiana, Michigan, Missouri, Ohio, Oklahoma, Tennessee, and South Carolina. In April 2022, Alabama became the second state to pass a similar bill, with governor Kay Ivey signing House Bill 322, legislation which additionally requires all students to use either male or female bathrooms in Alabama public schools based on their biological sex. It is noted that some states have had similar provisions to Florida's law since the 1980s, though they have never gained the name of "Don't Say Gay" bills by critics until recently.

==== Canadian bills ====
In 2023, the Canadian provinces of New Brunswick and Saskatchewan introduced new policies and legislation limiting sexual health education and requiring parental consent for changes to names and pronouns in schools, moves that have been cited as examples of the encroachment of American "culture wars" into Canadian politics. In Saskatchewan's case, Premier Scott Moe enshrined its policies in legislation called the Parents' Bill of Rights and invoked the constitution's notwithstanding clause to protect it from legal challenges based on the Charter of Rights and Freedoms. Both the Parents' Bill of Rights and New Brunswick's Policy 713 have resulted in significant protests and counter-protests.
