= John Cyrier =

Texas legislator

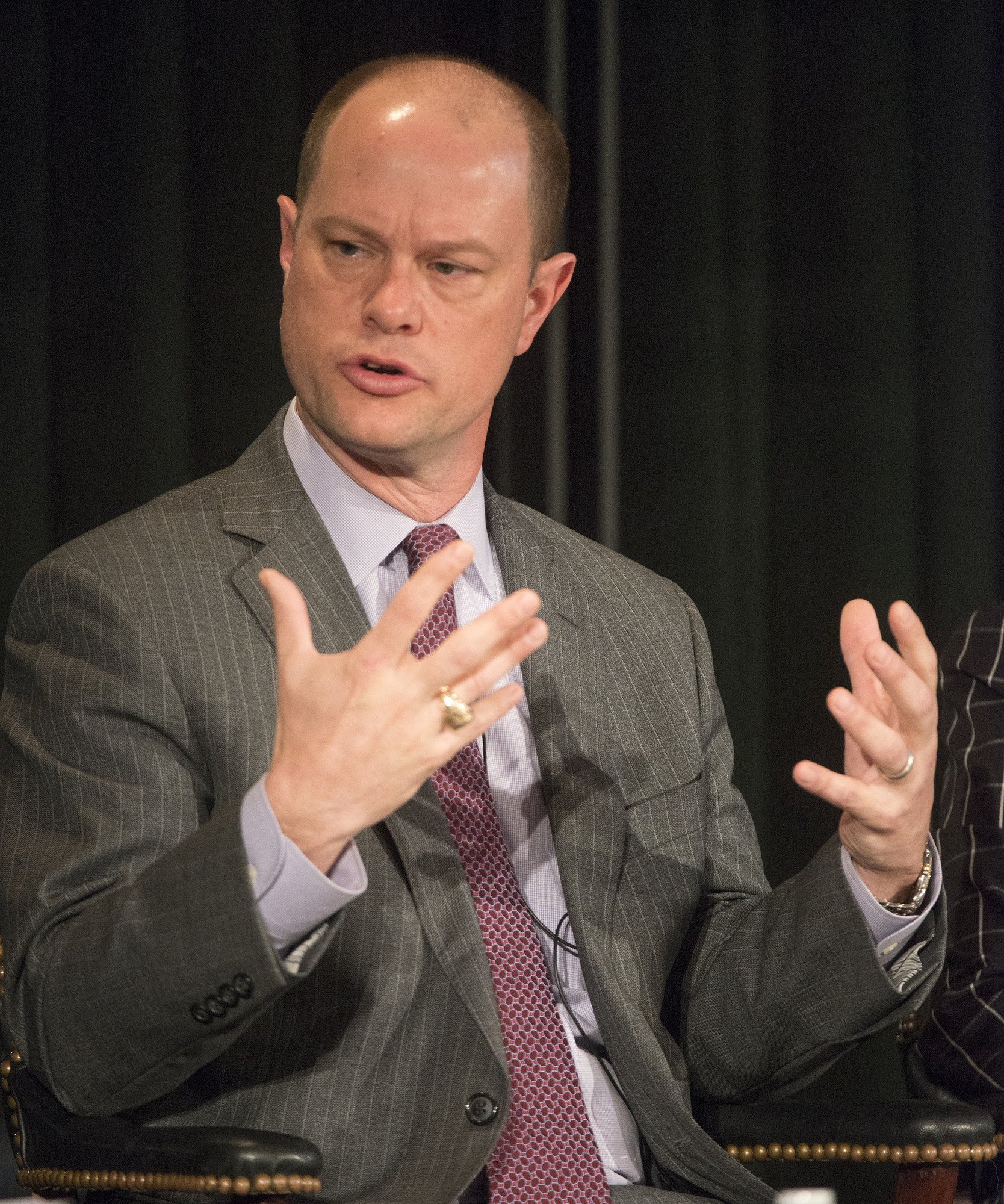
- Cyrier in 2019

Member of the Texas House of Representatives from the 17th district
- In office March 3, 2015 – January 10, 2023
- Preceded by: Tim Kleinschmidt
- Succeeded by: Stan Gerdes

Personal details
- Born: John Patrick Cyrier; May 4, 1973 (age 53)
- Party: Republican

John Patrick Cyrier /ˈsɪriˌeɪ/ (born May 4, 1973) is an American politician who served as a member of the Texas House of Representatives from the 17th district. Cyrier was first elected in a 2015 special election. He made an unsuccessful bid to become Speaker of the Texas House of Representatives for the 87th legislative session in 2021. Cyrier is a member of the Republican Party.

Texas House of Representatives
Preceded by Tim Kleinschmidt	Member of the Texas House of Representatives from the 17th district 2015–2023	Succeeded by Stan Gerdes
