= Furries (disambiguation) =

Furries are members of the furry fandom. "Furries" may also refer to:

- FURRIES act, proposed bill in Texas
- "Furries", song by Neil Cicierega from Mouth Silence, 2014
