= Charlie Stone =

Charlie Stone may refer to:

- Charlie Stone (politician) (born 1948), member of the Florida House of Representatives
- Charlie Stone (rugby league) (1950–2018), English rugby league footballer of the 1970s and 1980s
- Charlie Stone, a character in the TV series Veronica Mars
