= Whangārei Girls' High School =

New Zealand high school

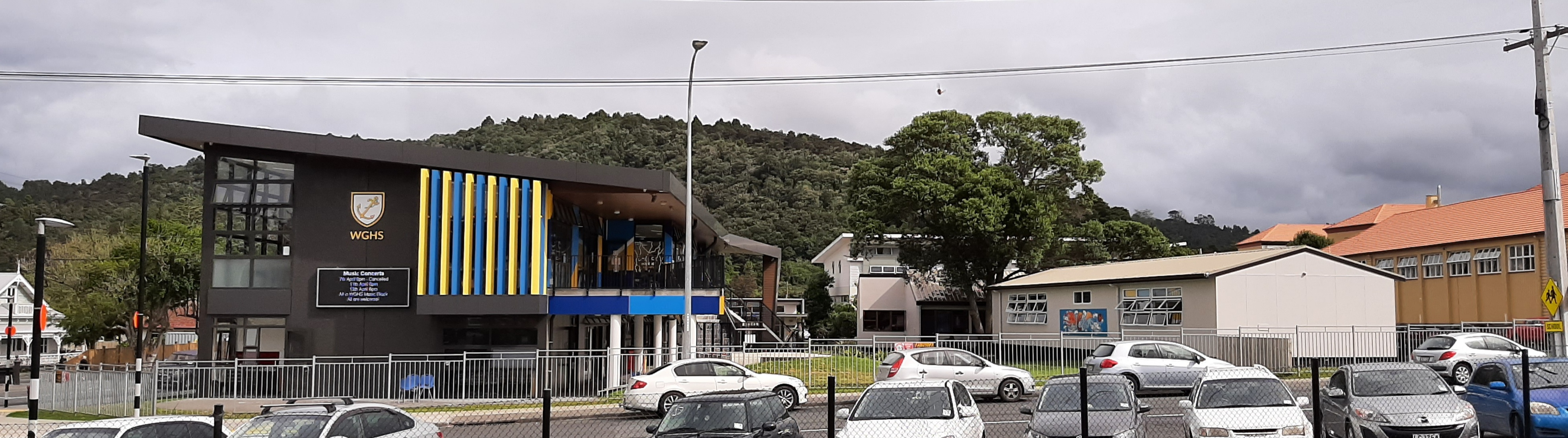

Location
- 1 Lupton Avenue, Whangārei; 35.71485°S 174.32°E

Information
- Type: Girls state secondary (years 9–13)
- Ministry of Education Institution no.: 16
- Principal: Sonya Lockyer
- Enrolment: 1,522 (July 2026)
- Website: www.wghs.school.nz

Whangārei Girls' High School is a single sex state secondary school founded in 1881 in Whangārei, New Zealand. It has a roll of 1,522 as of July 2026.

== History ==
Whangārei Girls' High School opened in 1881 alongside Whangārei Boys' High School.

In 2014, the school renamed a house that was named after Richard Seddon, an opponent of women's suffrage, to Sheppard House, named after Kate Sheppard, at the request of a student.

In 2017 the school started construction on 10 new classrooms, which was expected to cost $6.8 million. The block was named Manawa Ora (New Beginning). It was opened in March 2018. In November 2018 the school won the Ngā Tohu Kairangi Special Commendation Award at the Māori Language Awards.

In 2023, a TikTok video inspired by the 2021 litter boxes in schools hoax went viral, making baseless claims about student and staff behaviour. The acting principal at the time said that "none of this has any truth to it at all" and referred the incident to New Zealand online safety agency Netsafe.
