= Parental rights movement =

Movement against sex education and LGBT related education in schools

The parental rights movement is a socially conservative political movement aimed at restricting schools' ability to teach or practice certain viewpoints on gender, sexuality, and race without parental consent.

One of the aims of the movement is to prevent schools from using the preferred pronouns or chosen names of transgender and non-binary youth without disclosing to, or gaining permission from parents. More broadly, it aims to prevent the teaching of LGBT topics in public schools without parents' agreement. Additionally, the parental rights movement has sought to increase parents' control over how children are taught about sexuality and race relations.

The parental rights movement was brought to mainstream attention in 2022 with the passage of the Parental Rights in Education Act in Florida, colloquially known as the Don't Say Gay law, by Governor Ron DeSantis. Since then, the movement has expanded across the US and Canada. Proponents of the movement aim to prevent LGBT indoctrination of children through school activities such as the reading of LGBT books and student clubs, while opponents of the movement argue that parental rights legislation endangers children by possibly outing them to unaccepting guardians.

== Definition ==
Jen Gilbert, a professor at the University of Toronto's Ontario Institute for Studies in Education defined the movement as "a conservative movement to limit the influence of government in people's lives [...] more generally around the schooling, the parental rights movement has emerged as a movement to limit discussions of sexuality and gender in schools under the auspices of both protecting children and protecting parents' rights to raise children as they see fit".

=== Media response ===
The parental rights movement is viewed by some commentators as a form of pushback by conservatism against widespread acceptance of LGTBQ+ individuals and issues more broadly. It has been described as a far-right movement by Dan Lett of the Winnipeg Free Press and by progressive-leaning outlets Salon.com and Michigan Advance. The modern parental rights movement has been characterised by journalist Catherine Caruso as a resurgence of a similar movement in the 1990s. Caruso likened the movement to the stigmatization of HIV during the AIDS epidemic. She identified similar themes with the 1994 bill Contract with America and the Contract with the American Family.

== United States ==
Starting in 2020, parental rights activists in the United States have sought to regulate how race is taught in schools. Prompted by nationwide protests following the murder of George Floyd and killing of Breonna Taylor, schools increasingly added antiracist texts to their curricula and diversity, equity, and inclusion measures to their policies and practices. Advocacy from the parental rights movement led to a backlash against those trends, and a wave of laws and regulations—often codified as anti-critical race theory rules—were passed in 2021. Legal scholar LaToya Baldwin Clark connects the 2020s activism to historical backlash from White parents to "contestations over race" like desegregation.

Groups have suggested that similar ideas by parental rights advocates, which have worked to restrict education on sex or sexuality, date back to the 1990s. According to research by the Public Religion Research Institute, the movement's failure to substantially shift norms in public education led many conservative Christian parents to withdraw their children from public schools and move to homeschooling or private schools.

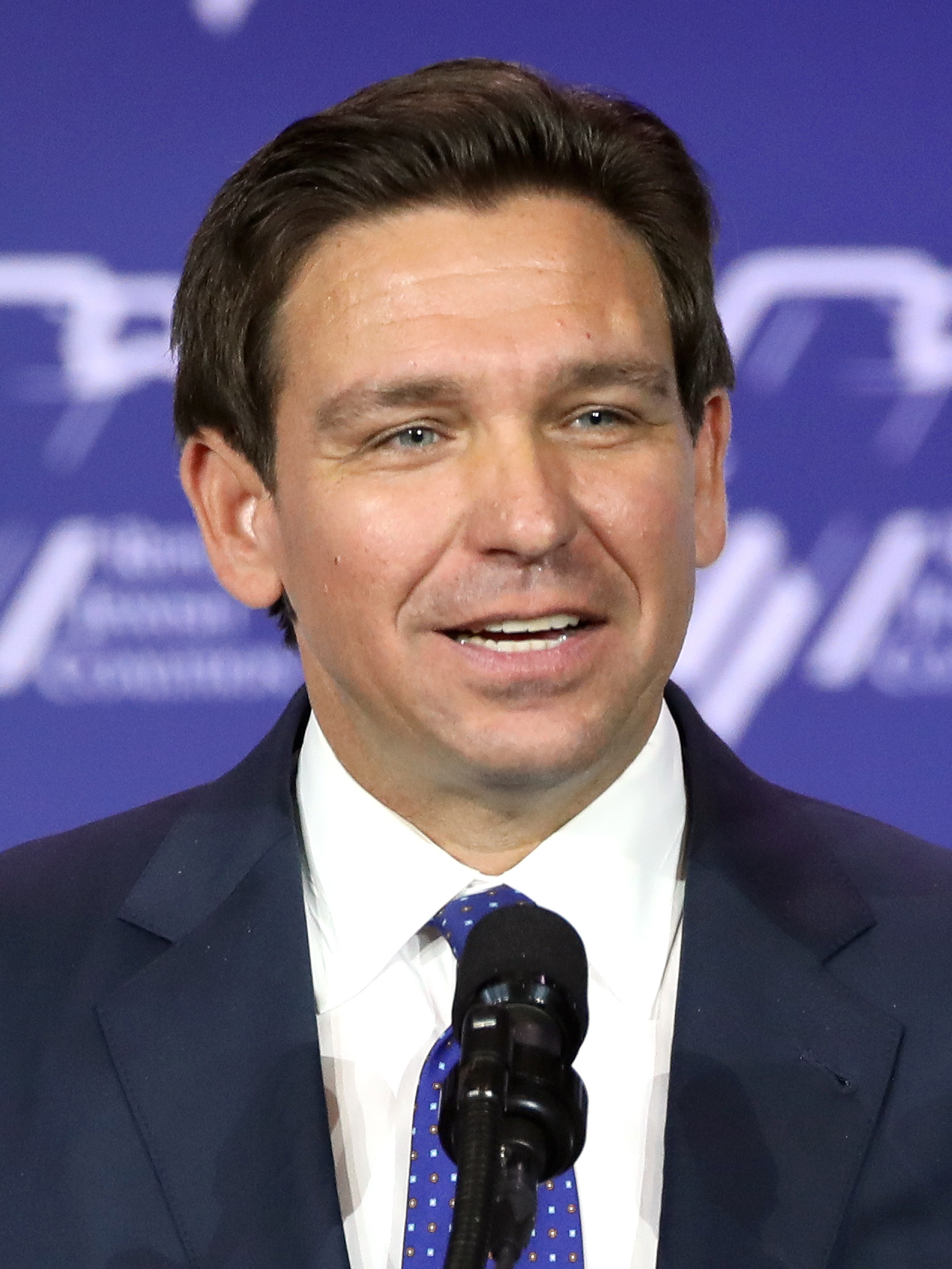
Florida Governor Ron DeSantis brought the parental rights movement to mainstream attention after he signed the Parental Rights in Education Act.

In 2022, the U.S. state of Florida passed the Florida Parental Rights in Education Act, regulating all public schools in the state. The law prohibits public schools from having "classroom discussion" or giving "classroom instruction about sexual orientation or gender identity from kindergarten through third grade or in any manner deemed to be against state standards in all grades; prohibits public schools from adopting procedures or student support forms that maintain the confidentiality of a disclosure by a student, including of the gender identity or sexual orientation of a student, from parents; and requires public schools to bear all the costs of all lawsuits filed by aggrieved parents."

Following its passage, Republicans in the House of Representatives introduced the Stop the Sexualization of Children Act, a bill largely based on the act in Florida.

During the nomination of Justice Ketanji Brown Jackson in 2022, Senator Marsha Blackburn accused Jackson of having a "hidden agenda" to restrict parental rights and expand government reach into schools.

As of 2023, 20 states have had their legislatures introduce derivative bills of the Parental Rights in Education Act, including Arizona, Georgia, Iowa, Kentucky, Louisiana, Michigan, Missouri, Ohio, Oklahoma, Tennessee, and South Carolina. In April 2022, Alabama became the second state to pass a similar bill, with Governor Kay Ivey signing House Bill 322, legislation which additionally requires all students to use either male or female bathrooms in Alabama public schools based on their biological sex. Some states have had similar provisions to Florida's law since the 1980s, though they were never called Don't Say Gay bills by critics until the 2020s.

Many potential candidates for the 2024 Republican Party presidential primaries made parental rights a major theme of their platform. Focusing on school literature with racial or sexual content, parental control over curriculum, and LGBTQ education, possible candidates like Glenn Youngkin, Ron DeSantis, and Donald Trump have endorsed the goals of the parental rights movement. Coverage in CNN has described this use of "parents' rights" as "an umbrella term for a host of cultural issues".

In 2025, the Supreme Court of the United States decided in Mahmoud v. Taylor that parents have the right to remove their children from school lessons featuring LGBTQ themed books.

== Canada ==
In 2009, Alberta passed an act that—while enshrining the rights of sexual minorities—also included a provision that would give parents the option of pulling their children out of lessons when topics related to sex, religion, or sexual orientation were taught. It was referred to as a "parental rights clause" in the media.

Prior to the start of the 2023 school year, the province of New Brunswick altered a policy affecting both formal and informal name changes at school, and the ability of students to choose their preferred pronouns. The revised Policy 713 (Sexual Orientation and Gender Identity Policy) denied students under the age of sixteen the right to make changes to their personal preferences without first receiving parental consent. The province's Minister of Education, Bill Hogan, stated that the policy review which led to the changes had been prompted by complaints from parents. The policy review was controversial, and along with concerns about Premier Blaine Higgs's leadership style, led to calls during the summer for a review of his leadership of the Progressive Conservative Party of New Brunswick. In response, the Christian conservative activist Faytene Grasseschi started a campaign called "Don't Delete Parents", encouraging people to sign a petition in support of Higgs, to pledge support for "pro-parent" political candidates, and to promote the idea that tax dollars should "follow the family" if parents chose to withdraw their children from the public school system in favour of homeschooling or private schools.

In the same year, Saskatchewan also introduced a policy requiring parental consent for children who wished to change their names or pronouns in school and placing restrictions on sexual health education. Following a judicial injunction against the policy, Premier Scott Moe announced that he would invoke the Constitution's Notwithstanding clause to override the decision and bring the policy into law. On October 20, 2023, the government invoked the notwithstanding clause and passed the Parents' Bill of Rights. A national Christian lobbying group called "Action4Canada" has taken credit for influencing the Saskatchewan Party government towards the policy.

In September 2023, Ontario Premier Doug Ford accused school boards in the province of "indoctrinating" students on gender identity, and stated that parents should be involved with decisions around pronoun use at schools.

In the lead-up to the 2023 Manitoba general election in October 2023, the Progressive Conservative Party led by Heather Stefanson promised expanded parental rights in schools. Stefanson's party was defeated by Wab Kinew's New Democratic Party.

Federally, Conservative Party of Canada members adopted a resolution to prohibit "medicinal or surgical interventions" for gender-diverse and transgender kids at the party's 2023 policy convention. Party leader—and leader of the Opposition—Pierre Poilievre has said that schools should leave LGBT issues to parents.

In 2023, the "1 Million March 4 Children" was a series of parental rights protests carried out in various cities throughout Canada. The protesters included adults and students, who claimed that children were being exposed to inappropriate topics regarding sexuality and gender identity and that students in some Canadian schools were being encouraged by teachers to change their pronouns and get "body-altering surgery" without parental knowledge. The protests drew significant counter-protests.

In 2026, the government of Alberta passed a bill requiring sexually explicit library materials to be approved for check-out by parents of children under the age of 15. It is set to take effect in January 2027. Critics of the bill say that it promotes censorship and inhibits freedom of speech because many of the newly restricted titles are LGBT-specific books.

== Europe ==
=== France ===
In 2022, following the addition of a gender-neutral pronoun to French dictionaries, French Minister of Education Jean-Michel Blanquer insisted that it was "not the future of the French language" and banned its use in schools.

=== Ireland ===
In Ireland, groups such as the Irish Education Alliance and religious bodies such as the Catholic Secondary School Parents Association have opposed the government's introduction of mandatory education about gender identity, pornography, and sexuality, which they perceive as overriding the ethos and rights of parents and schools.

== Impact on LGBTQ youth ==
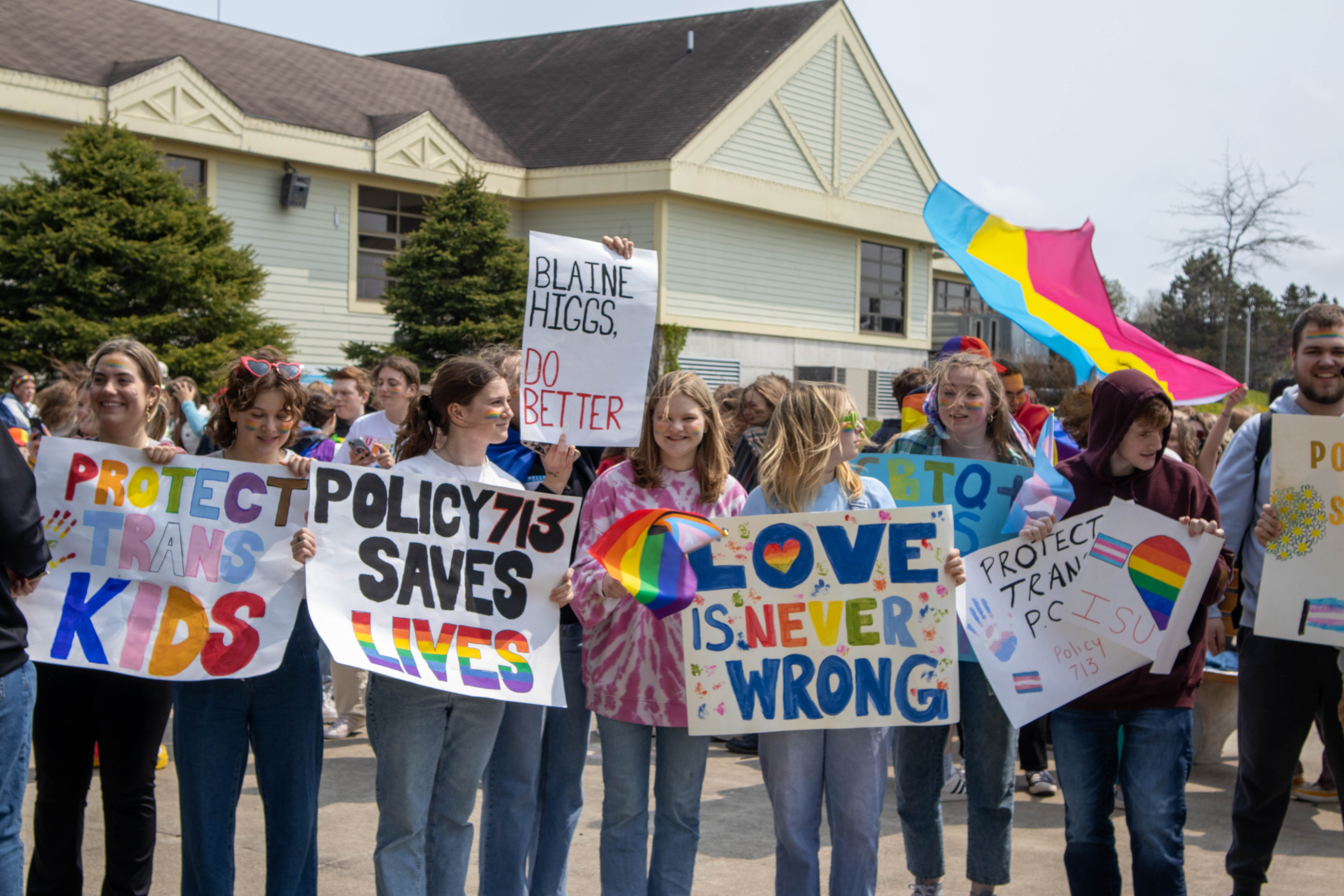
Pro-LGBTQ students in New Brunswick, Canada conducting a walkout protest against parental rights movement induced changes to the province's Sexual Orientation and Gender Identity policy

Opponents of the parental rights movement argue that the policy would result in forcibly out children to parents or guardians who may not be accepting of their gender or sexual identities. In Canada, opponents such as Marci Ien, the Minister for Women and Gender Equality and Youth, has said that requiring parental consent to use different names or preferred pronouns places trans children in a "life or death situation." In the United States, organised opposition like the Human Rights Campaign oppose the expansion of bills that limit LGBT freedom and expression in schools, suggesting they "stigmatize and marginalize" the LGBTQ community.

Critics of the parental rights movement include parents, teachers, students, human rights groups, and corporations. They argue that policies which forcibly out LGBTQ children can be damaging or life-threatening to those with unsupportive families. Such policies have garnered significant concern due to the claimed potential for adverse consequences, including emotional distress, harm to mental well-being, and life-threatening situations for those affected, and can exacerbate issues such as depression, anxiety, and self-esteem problems. It has been suggested that these issues may lead to long-term emotional scars and negatively impacting their overall quality of life.

Additionally, critics highlight that the parental rights movement's insistence on parental control over a child's disclosure of their LGBTQ identity can perpetuate discrimination and prejudice. By prioritizing parental rights over a child's autonomy, these policies may inadvertently discourage open and honest communication within families, hindering the ability of LGBTQ youth to seek support or understanding from their loved ones.

== See also ==
- Anti-gender movement – International movement opposed to the concept of gender identity
- Children's rights movement – Social movement
- Christian right – Socially conservative Christian political ideology
- Discrimination against LGBT people
- Florida Parental Rights in Education Act – Florida statute commonly known as the "Don't Say Gay" bill
- Litter boxes in schools hoax – Right-wing hoax
- Parent-controlled school – Type of private school
- Youth rights – Equal rights movement
