= FURRIES Act =

Proposed Texas bill

Texas Legislature
- Long title: A bill to be entitled an Act relating to the display of and allowance for non-human behaviors in Texas schools.
- Territorial extent: Texas

Legislative history
- Bill title: H.B.ANo.A4814
- Introduced by: Stan Gerdes
- Introduced: March 12, 2025

Summary
- Banning of non-human roleplaying and acting by children in school
- Status: Not passed

The Forbidding Unlawful Representation of Roleplaying in Educational Spaces Act was a proposed bill in Texas that sought to ban animal-like behavior, costumes and roleplaying in schools. The title, initialized the FURRIES Act, is a backronym referencing members of the furry fandom. The bill failed to pass committee in the 89th Texas Legislature.

== Bill ==
The bill aimed to stop all acts of animal behavior in public schools. Prohibited actions would have included barking, hissing, meowing, licking oneself for grooming, and using litter boxes to relieve oneself. Any accessory that is animal-like was included in the bill. Prohibited accessories would have included, fursuits, collars, tails, leashes, accessories designed for pets, and items historically not designed for humans.

The bill attempted to make allowing or encouraging a child to believe that non-human behaviors are socially acceptable in an educational setting to be considered child abuse. School districts who failed to enforce the law could have faced fines, with penalties starting at $10,000.

The bill sought to extend parental rights in schools, allowing parents to file complaints against schools or educators who fail to comply, potentially leading to legal action from the Texas Attorney General's Office.

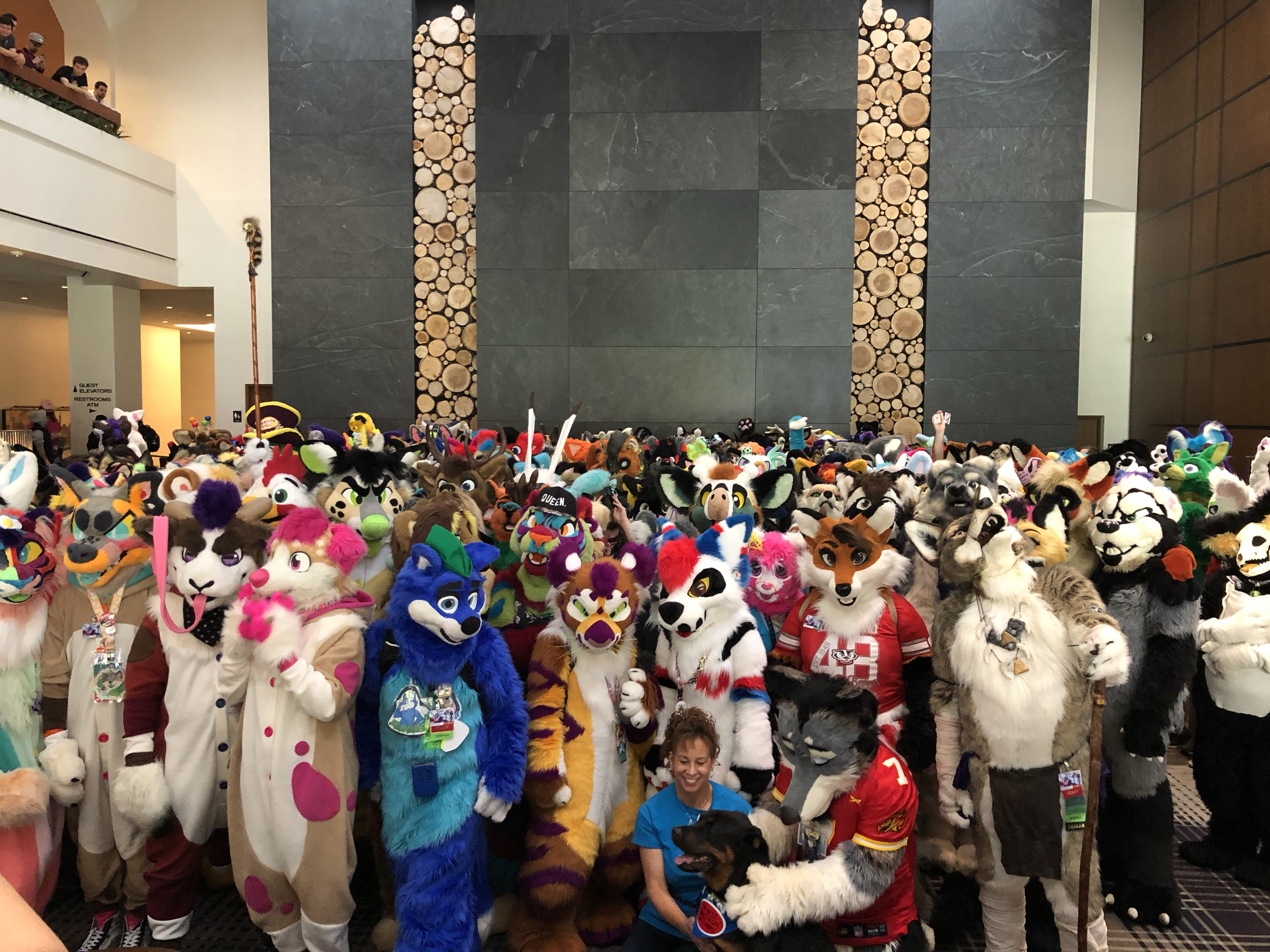
Furries at a furry convention

The bill excluded school sports mascots, characters in plays, and designated dress up days including Halloween.

Texas Governor Greg Abbott stated in a news interview, "Kids go to school dressed up as cats with litter boxes in their classrooms" and shared a conspiracy theory that kids were getting surgery to have non-human features, though this was proven to be a myth. These conspiracies were supported by Baptist ministers in Austin in order to gain support for the bill and to push for education savings accounts or school vouchers, which would give families taxpayer funds to go toward private-school tuition.

The bill was sponsored by State Representative Stan Gerdes, who stated on Twitter, "No distractions. No theatrics. Just education. While school mascots, theater performances, and dress-up days remain part of school spirit, this bill ensures that students and teachers can focus on academics – not on bizarre and unhealthy disruptions. Texas schools are for educating kids, not indulging in radical trends." Gerdes claimed he wrote the bill in response to an incident at Smithville Independent School District, though there is no record of any incident and Gerdes did not provide further details. He has stated his dislike of the furry fandom, calling it "unhealthy roleplaying" and "radical".

=== Criticism ===
Educators in Texas have criticized the bill and its supporters, claiming that it is based on a right-wing hoax claiming students were using litter boxes to relieve themselves. Others have criticized the bill as being a proxy attack against members of the LGBTQ community, particularly bathroom access for transgender people, as a significant portion of the furry community identifies as LGBTQ.

School clubs for table top and live action role-playing raised concerns that the bill may have forced them to cease activities and effectively ban Dungeons & Dragons in Texas schools, potentially violating student First Amendment rights established by the Supreme Court ruling in Tinker v. Des Moines.

== See also ==
- Anti-LGBTQ curriculum laws in the United States
- Drag panic
