= Joe Harding =

American politician (born 1987)

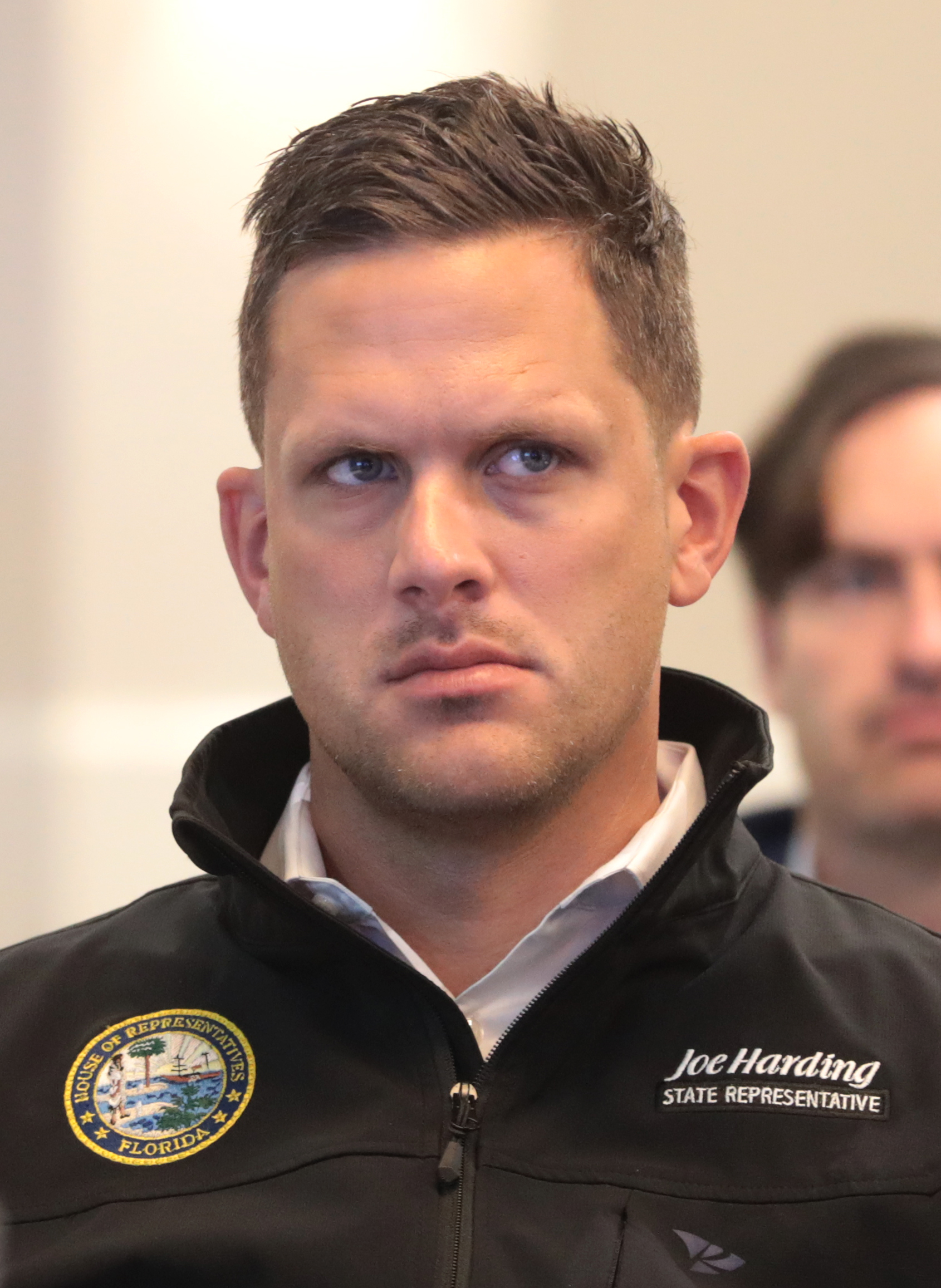
- Harding at the 2022 Hazlitt Summit hosted by Young Americans for Liberty Foundation

Member of the Florida House of Representatives from the 22nd district
- In office November 3, 2020 – December 8, 2022
- Preceded by: Charlie Stone
- Succeeded by: Ryan Chamberlin

Personal details
- Born: June 18, 1987 (age 39) Williston, Florida, U.S.
- Party: Republican
- Children: 4

Joe Harding (born June 18, 1987) is an American politician and businessman who was a member of the Florida House of Representatives from 2020 until his resignation in 2022. A member of the Republican Party, Harding is most well known for introducing the Florida Parental Rights in Education Act, commonly known by opponents as the "Don't Say Gay" act.

In October 2023, Harding was sentenced to four months in prison for wire fraud, money laundering, and making false statements.

== Early life and education ==
Harding was born and raised in Williston, Florida. He studied construction management at the College of Central Florida and Florida International University

== Career ==
Harding worked as a project manager in the construction industry for several years before founding Stripes Lawn Care in 2018. Harding was elected to the Florida House of Representatives in November 2020. He was a member of the House Education & Employment Committee.

In 2021, Harding introduced the controversial Florida Parental Rights in Education Act, prohibiting teachers from discussing LGBT related topics in Kindergarten through 3rd grade school classrooms in Florida. In 2022, Harding offered an amendment to the bill requiring public schools to out gay children to their parents once the schools learn that the child is not heterosexual, which was later withdrawn. The legislation has widely been opposed, garnering criticism from President Joe Biden, the United Nations Human Rights Council through an independent expert, and numerous human rights organizations.

=== Federal indictment ===
On December 7, 2022, Harding was indicted by a federal grand jury on six counts of wire fraud and money laundering related to a scheme to defraud the Small Business Administration of more than $150,000 in COVID-19-related small business loans. Harding was released on bond and lost his committee assignments for the upcoming legislative term. Harding resigned on December 8, 2022.

A trial was scheduled to begin on January 11, 2023, in Gainesville, Florida. On March 21, 2023, Harding pleaded guilty to one count of wire fraud, one count of money laundering, and one count of making false statements. In October 2023, he was sentenced to 4 months in federal prison, with 2 years of supervised release and a $300 fine.
