= Litter boxes in schools hoax =

Right-wing hoax

The litter boxes in schools hoax was an urban legend spread in 2021 and 2022 that schools were installing litter boxes in bathrooms to be used by students who "identify as cats" or with the furry or otherkin subcultures. The belief in and spread of the hoax has been described as "furry panic". Various right-wing and anti-LGBTQ sources circulated these claims as part of a moral panic against school accommodations for transgender youth, such as unisex toilets. Ahead of the 2022 US elections, the hoax was promoted by Republican politicians Marjorie Taylor Greene, Lauren Boebert, Scott Jensen, Heidi Ganahl, Don Bolduc, and media personalities Joe Rogan, Chaya Raichik, and Bill Cunningham. Parents of school-aged children also circulated the rumors on social media apps like Facebook.

Different iterations named dozens of different schools and districts throughout the US and Canada. Officials have routinely debunked such claims, and there is no evidence that any school has ever held such a policy.

== Background ==
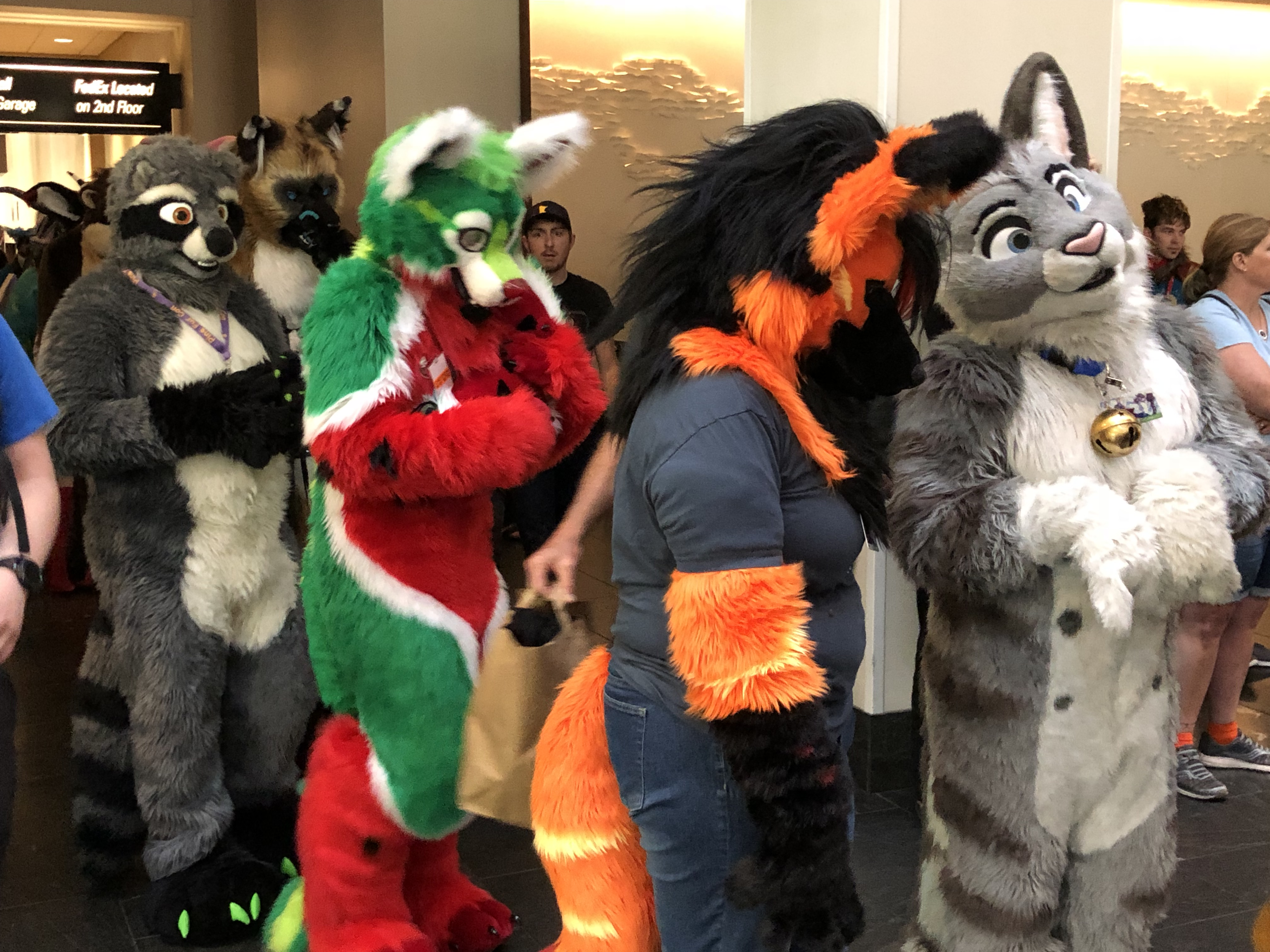
People in fursuits

Furries are a subculture interested in anthropomorphic animal characters, with fandom members frequently often interacting with others through online roleplay, art, conventions and cosplay. Many view the fandom solely as a hobby, and do not identify as or perceive themselves to be animals. Those that do may identify as otherkin. While the fandom is popularly perceived as such, it is not innately sexual or fetishistic. LGBTQ+ identity is substantially over-represented among furries compared to the general population.

According to Utah State University folklorist Lynn McNeill, urban legends and jokes about furries using litter boxes date back to at least the early 2000s. Sharon Roberts, a faculty member at Renison University College and co-founder of a furry research group called Furscience, had not, in a decade of researching furry conventions, encountered any instances of furries using litter boxes.

School boards in the late 2010s and early 2020s saw heightened controversy (described by some as a moral panic or culture war) regarding accommodations for transgender students, such as unisex restrooms, and allowing them to use bathrooms and participate on sports teams corresponding to their genders. High rates of suicide and suicidal ideation among transgender youth were also cause for concern. In 2022, parental rights groups across the U.S. made a concerted push to ban books discussing race, gender, and sexuality from schools and public libraries.

In 2016, American radio show host Michael L. Brown wrote an opinion piece in The Christian Post opposing transgender accommodations and gender-affirming procedures, stating, "if we don't stop this downward slide, we might soon be required to provide litter boxes for people who identify as cats". Some conservative politicians and alt-right media commentators had used false litter box rumors to generate alarm about what accommodations for LGBTQ+ students might lead to, and have falsely accused LGBTQ-inclusive educators of "child grooming".

Throughout 2021 and 2022, online rumors of students dressing and acting like cats circulated, spurred on by prank videos. Rumors sparked public outcry and calls for administrative action from concerned parents, with a school board in Statesville, North Carolina proposing a formal ban on animal costumes. In August 2021, a high school in Meade County, Kentucky, said that a small number of students had violated their existing dress code. There was no evidence, however, that any schools had provided litter boxes in restrooms to any students.

The only known official instance of cat litter being placed in school classrooms for potential use by students was in the late 2010s by the Jefferson County Public School District in Colorado, where the 1999 Columbine High School massacre took place. Some teachers were given "go buckets" that contained cat litter to be used as a toilet in an emergency lockdown situation, such as during a school shooting.

== Timeline ==
=== Canada ===
Unsubstantiated rumors surfaced in Prince Edward Island in October 2021. After the rumors spread widely in schools and on social media, the Public Schools Branch denied claims of litter boxes, with district director Norbert Carpenter saying "It seemed to me like it was a backlash against some of the progressive things that our schools are doing, and we would have many that would say this is rooted in hate".

As the hoax spread widely in the United States and garnered media attention, online rumors spread to several other Canadian provinces and schools. In September 2022, Durham District School Board in Ontario denied rumors and said they "may be rooted in transphobia and homophobia with the intent to diminish and trivialize gender identity, gender expression and sexual orientation and cause harm to students and staff who identify as 2SLGBTQI". (Note: "2SLGBTQI" is the acronym for two-spirit, lesbian, gay, bisexual, transgender, queer, questioning, and intersex.) In October 2022, in response to a letter that was sent to local media, administrators for the Renfrew County District School Board or Renfrew County Catholic District School Board in Ontario issued statements that their schools "do not have, and have never had, litter boxes in any of our elementary or secondary sites". A school official said there was a request for cat litter in one school, but it was denied by the school board and that they did not recognize animal identities. The same month, the education director of the Lambton-Kent District School Board dispelled litter box rumors.

By November 2022, school officials for several other Canadian provinces released statements refuting rumors that litter boxes were being provided in schools.

=== United States ===
In December 2021, conservative activist Lisa Hansen in Michigan gave public testimony before the Midland Public Schools school board as it discussed COVID-19 testing requirements for students, claiming she was informed that litter boxes had been added in bathrooms for students who "identify as cats", along with claiming that it was a "nationwide" issue and that there was an "agenda that is being pushed". The rumors later gained traction in January 2022, after a video of the school board meeting was shared by Meshawn Maddock, the co-chair for the Michigan Republican Party, who promoted the rumors. The video was also shared by Libs of TikTok, a politically influential right-wing Twitter account of Chaya Raichik with several hundred-thousand followers. The superintendent for the school district of Midland Public Schools described the claims as false, stating "There is no truth whatsoever to this false statement [...] There have never been litter boxes within MPS schools".

In January 2022, Michelle Evans, a Texan Republican running for Congress, claimed that cafeteria tables were "being lowered in certain Round Rock Independent School District middle and high schools to allow 'furries' to more easily eat without utensils or their hands". The school district denied the claims.

In February 2022, the Carroll Community School District in Iowa was accused of providing litter boxes for those who identified as cats. The district's superintendent denied this claim, stating "Staff members are not encouraging or accommodating anyone behaving or identifying as a cat or any other animal".

In March 2022, a conservative commentator promoted false claims that the Waunakee School District in Wisconsin had a "furry protocol" specifying the rules for furries, including being "allowed to dress in their choice of furry costumes" and "choose not to run in gym class but instead sit at the feet of their teacher and lick their paws". Reuters fact-checked the claim, stating there was no evidence for it; the school district also denied the claim. Joe Seiwert, a Kansas state representative, made a false claim during a public forum. In North Dakota, Fargo School Board member Jennifer Benson said litter boxes had been placed in school restrooms, but she declined to present evidence of it when requested by local media, and school officials in Fargo and elsewhere in North Dakota said the claim was the result of false rumors being spread nationally. Despite several rumors in the Midwest being debunked, false rumors circulated on internet forums in Cache Valley, Utah, about litter boxes being placed in Sky View High School, which schools officials could not corroborate.

In April 2022, a satirical post of a fake email went viral, claiming that Kokomo High School in Indiana was allowing students identifying as animals to have "special accommodations and certain privileges", including litter boxes in bathrooms. The Associated Press reported that the post was shared more than 10,000 times. The school's principal confirmed the post was fake. In New York, administrators for Dansville Central School refuted litter box rumors after an Instagram post received thousands of views. Later in the same month, two Republican lawmakers in the Minnesota House of Representatives, Steve Drazkowski and Tim Miller, repeated debunked stories about schools providing litter boxes in a debate about a statewide student survey. School board candidates in Arkansas, Tennessee, and North Dakota also made unverified claims about litter boxes being provided in schools.

In March 2022, during a televised debate on a bill in the Nebraska legislature, the Republican state senator Bruce Bostelman claimed that "schools are wanting to put litter boxes in the schools" for students who were furries. A few hours after, the state senator retracted his claim and apologized, having gained backlash online. In Iowa, Republican state senator Tim Kraayenbrink said at a public forum that schools were putting litter boxes in schools for furries to use. He later said that he had not verified the claim was true prior to sharing it. By that same month, local school officials in Maine and Vermont had also dispelled litter box rumors.

In June 2022, social media posts in Hannibal, Missouri, falsely claimed that the school district there was placing water bowls and cat litter boxes in school restrooms and that the issue would be discussed at an upcoming board meeting. In response, the superintendent of the school board visited every bathroom in the district, and verified at the meeting that the rumors were false.

In July 2022, administrators for Meade School District in South Dakota clarified in response to rumors that litter boxes would not be provided to students who self-identify as animals in response to rumors. In Maine, Republican Congressional candidate Ed Thelander repeated the hoax in an interview for a far-right website. When a clip of the interview circulated widely in the media in October, Thelander said, "I don't believe it now", and that he was unable to corroborate the rumors he had heard from others.

In August 2022, rumors of litter boxes were directed at two high schools in South Carolina. Administrators for Horry County Schools said the rumors were part of a nationwide hoax and untrue.

In September 2022, during a rally for president Donald Trump, congresswoman Marjorie Taylor Greene promoted the rumors while she was interviewed by RSBN. Colorado Republican gubernatorial candidate Heidi Ganahl falsely claimed that schools in the state were recognizing cat identities of students. Ganahl criticized schools that allowed students to dress up as cats, but she did not claim schools were providing litter boxes. In Ohio, State Board of Education member Brendan Shea repeated the litter box rumor in debate about a resolution to restrict protections for LGBTQ+ students. In Tennessee, state senator Janice Bowling made the litter box claim during a committee meeting and characterized it as "growing crisis" – state and local officials countered that it was false information. In Rhode Island, Mary Brimer, a Republican town council member for North Kingstown, posted on social media that two local students were identifying as cats and were being accommodated with litter boxes in school restrooms – the superintendent of the local school district said the rumors were false. Local education officials in South Carolina and Pennsylvania issued public statements to refute local and national rumors that litter boxes were being provided in schools. In Minnesota, Republican gubernatorial candidate Scott Jensen repeated the false rumor in a campaign speech about gender identity issues. Jensen said:

"But what about education? What are we doing to our kids? Why are we telling elementary kids that they get to choose their gender this week? Why do we have litter boxes in some of the school districts so kids can pee in them, because they identify as a furry? We've lost our minds. We've lost our minds."

Jensen's campaign declined media requests to substantiate the litter box claim, which the Minnesota Department of Education and several school districts refuted.

In October 2022, Illinois Republican congressional candidate in the 11th district Catalina Lauf reacted to a CNN news story about Jensen's false claim, saying on Twitter, "...this is not a hoax and is happening in schools in Illinois, too". When confronted by local media to validate the claim, Lauf instead criticized a state policy to provide free menstrual hygiene products in schools and teachers who refer to children by their preferred gender pronouns. At a campaign event, congresswoman Lauren Boebert alleged that litter boxes were being provided to students who identify as cats in Durango, Colorado, which administrators for the local school district said were untrue. In North Carolina, Iredell-Statesville Schools considered a ban on students wearing furry costumes, in part due to the burden of staff having to refute unsubstantiated rumors about litter boxes in restrooms. The school district, along with nearby Lincoln County Schools, said there was no evidence of litter boxes being used on campuses. While interviewing Tulsi Gabbard on his Spotify show, Joe Rogan shared a rumor that a school was providing a litter box for a student that identified as a cat. Rogan offered no evidence to support the claim, which was circulated on social media and shared on Instagram by the Libs of TikTok account. Rogan said in an interview with Uproxx several weeks later that "it doesn't seem that there's any proof that they put a litter box in there", but also claimed that "there [were] discussions about doing it because there was one particularly wacky mother". During an interview with Ohio Republican Senate candidate JD Vance, Christian talk show host Bill Cunningham said that schools were providing litter boxes for students to defecate in. During a tele-town hall with U.S. Senator Ron Johnson of Wisconsin, a participant shared a rumor that litter boxes were being placed in West Bend schools.

While speaking to supporters at a campaign event, retired brigadier general and United States Senate candidate Don Bolduc alleged schools were providing litter boxes to students who dress up as furries and cats. In November 2022, Bolduc said during a televised debate that the burden was on the school to prove that litter boxes were not being used; the school named by Bolduc confirmed it was a false allegation. Several school officials in San Luis Obispo County, California, had to refute false litter box rumors, which may have emanated from the promulgation of the hoax by radio show host Joe Rogan. Rogan subsequently admitted to spreading misinformation. As he endorsed two local school board candidates, Indiana Republican state representative Robert Morris falsely claimed schools were providing "litter boxes in bathrooms for students identifying as animals". In Oklahoma, Ryan Walters, a candidate for state school superintendent, spread the rumor while speaking at a campaign event.

American football television commentator Tony Dungy posted a statement on Twitter promoting the hoax on January 18, 2023. After facing backlash, he deleted the tweet and later apologized.

Lycoming County, Pennsylvania commissioner asking in September 2023 if any children in the county identify as "dogs or cats" and require litter boxes at a public meeting, to which the answer is "no", then asking if it is happening in other school districts.

In August 2023, Fox News anchor Shannon Bream repeated the hoax, claiming that parents in northern Virginia had told her it was happening in their schools.

In 2025, the FURRIES Act (full name: Forbidding Unlawful Representation of Roleplaying in Education Act) was proposed in Texas to prevent any animal-like behavior in schools that was based on this hoax.

=== United Kingdom ===
In January 2023, Aberdeenshire council repudiated claims made on social media that students at Banff Academy had taken part in dirty protests due to the non-provision of litter boxes for "furries".

In November 2023, a school in Pontypool, Wales, wrote to parents in response to "a number of queries and concerns raised within the community" about the provision of litter trays to pupils, clarifying that no such trays existed.

=== Australia ===
In 2024, it was falsely claimed that a high school in Cairns, Queensland had installed a giant litter box for furries. The Department of Education confirmed that this claim was false.

In 2025, Hobart City Councillor Louise Elliot claimed litterboxes were being supplied to Claremont College, as well as an unnamed school in the Kingborough municipality. A spokesperson for the Department for Education, Children and Young People stated "There is no evidence to suggest any school has implemented such accommodations." MP Kristie Johnston stated "The allegations she [Cr Elliot] has made in her X post have been shown time and time again to be nothing more than urban myths."

=== New Zealand ===
In 2023 a video of Whangārei Girls' High School students claiming that students identifying as furries required litter boxes in the school received several hundred thousand views. The school responded in June by saying that "None of this has any truth to it at all".

== Fact-checking assessments ==
Several news media and fact-checking organizations have debunked the claims that schools were providing litter boxes to students to use in restrooms as unsubstantiated.

In early 2022, Snopes rated claims of litter boxes being placed in restrooms in Michigan schools as "false" and the Agence France-Presse said they were "baseless". As rumors spread in April 2022, news fact-checking organization PolitiFact did not find any credible news reports to support the claim that schools were providing litter boxes for students and rated the claim "Pants on Fire!". Two fact-checking assessment by Reuters, in July 2022 and again in October 2022, concluded that there was no evidence that schools were officially recognizing the animal expressions of students participating in the furry fandom trend or accommodating students with litter boxes. According to an NBC News analysis, by mid October 2022, at least 20 conservative candidates and election officials had asserted that elementary and secondary schools were providing litter boxes or other accommodations for students who identify as cats—every school district named in such claims said they were false. A review of the rumors by center-right news website The Bulwark reached a similar conclusion as NBC News and referred to the hoax as "Furrygate".

== Reactions ==
=== News media columnists ===
Elizabeth Brown from Reason suggested the false litter box rumors became popular due to "lin[ing] up perfectly with conservative fears about transgender and non-binary students". Kelly Weill from The Daily Beast argued that the politicization of furries in classrooms was a proxy for the broader cultural discussion about race and gender issues. Michelle Goldberg of The New York Times argued the rumors were part of a generational conflict over sex and gender identity issues in schools, and compared the rumors to the satanic panic frenzy of the 1980s. Columnist Gene Lyons in a Chicago Sun-Times opinion piece compared the litter box hoax to the moral panics behind the 16th century werewolves tales in Germany and the witch hunts of 17th century New England. Hayes Brown, an MSNBC opinion columnist, said it was unclear if politicians spreading the rumors actually believed them or not, but that either way the act of repeating the rumors was "to the detriment of trans kids".

Ben Cost of the conservative tabloid newspaper New York Post explained the history of the Michigan rumors, saying, "It's a load of kitty litter". Christopher Tremoglie of the conservative website Washington Examiner said that rumors in mid 2022 of litter boxes in Iowa schools were false. He also said regarding a widely circulated story by the Herald Sun tabloid newspaper about an Australian teenager allowed to act as a cat in class that was never verified, and of the broader discussion of gender identity issues, "This is the world we live in today, and this is the danger created by normalizing transgender delusions in young students who may get over it. The enabling of this behavior is helping people with legitimate mental health issues get applause instead of the medical help they truly need".

In an opinion article in the Arizona Daily Star, Judy Doll argued that Republican politicians were using the litter box hoax as a way to call "into question the moral values of everyone associated with public schools". Kathie Obradovich, an opinion editor with the Iowa Capital Dispatch, argued that the litter box hoax served the political purpose of instilling fear in parents of public schools as a way to shift public education dollars towards private and religious schools. Todd Dorman of The Gazette made a similar argument.

=== LGBTQ+ activists ===
Local LGBTQ+ activists in Prince Edward Island said the October 2021 litter box rumors were a form of internet trolling in an attempt "to make the queer community seem ridiculous, in order to paint all of the community's concerns as absurd". James Factora, a writer with LGBTQ+ news website Them, compared the litter box hoax to 2020 United States election conspiracy theories; stating, "The tactic of repeating a completely baseless lie until it becomes widely accepted as truth has become perhaps the most emblematic rhetorical strategy of the GOP". Geoff Wetrosky of the Human Rights Campaign, said, "The attention this freakish lie has received on social media illustrates the pernicious influence of disinformation and that anti-LGBTQIA+ politicians will do and say anything to animate the most extreme fringe—no matter the consequence". Leigh Finke, a transgender candidate for the Minnesota House of Representatives in the 2022 election, said about the rumors, "It's a really gross thing no one should have to hear. It is not true. And I don't want to waste my time saying trans kids aren't animals".

=== Teachers ===
Education Minnesota said that the internet hoax "appears to be an attempt to discredit school policies intended to make schools safe and welcoming for students".

=== Satire and comedy ===
Australian satirical website Damascus Dropbear published a new fake story in August 2022 about a school in Melbourne providing litter boxes. Television show host John Oliver debunked litter box claims on the episode of Last Week Tonight that aired on October 24, 2022.

== Impact ==
=== 2022 United States elections ===
In the months leading up to the 2022 United States elections, online mentions of the litter boxes in schools increased significantly as several Republican candidates repeated the hoax. It was also mentioned by talk show hosts such as Joe Rogan. Attempts by the news media to debunk false rumors were largely unsuccessful in stopping their spread.

Many of the prominent American politicians seeking public office who promoted the hoax were defeated in the 2022 elections. Among those who promoted the hoax who were unsuccessful in seeking public office included New Hampshire candidate for U.S. Senate Don Bolduc, Colorado candidate for governor Heidi Ganahl, Illinois candidate for the U.S. House of Representatives Catalina Lauf, Minnesota candidate for governor Scott Jensen, and Maine candidate for the U.S. House of Representatives Ed Thelander. Those who had promoted the hoax and prevailed in their races included U.S. Senate candidate JD Vance from Ohio and incumbent U.S. Representatives Marjorie Taylor Greene and Lauren Boebert.

Virginia Chamlee of People said that Bolduc's repeating of the false claims during his political campaign may have alienated moderate voters and led to his defeat by Maggie Hassan in the race for a New Hampshire United States Senate seat.

=== Proposed legislation ===
Several Republican lawmakers in the U.S. state of North Dakota sponsored legislation to prohibit schools from adopting "a policy establishing or providing a place, facility, school program, or accommodation that caters to a student's perception of being any animal species other than human". In January 2024, Oklahoma representative Justin Humphrey introduced legislation that would ban students that identify as animals or who "engage in anthropomorphic behavior" from participating in school activities and allow animal control to remove the student from the premises. In March 2025, Texas representative Stan Gerdes sponsored a similar bill, the Forbidding Unlawful Representation of Roleplaying in Education (FURRIES) Act.

== See also ==
- Anti-gender movement
- Bathroom bill
