= Charlie Stone (politician) =

American politician

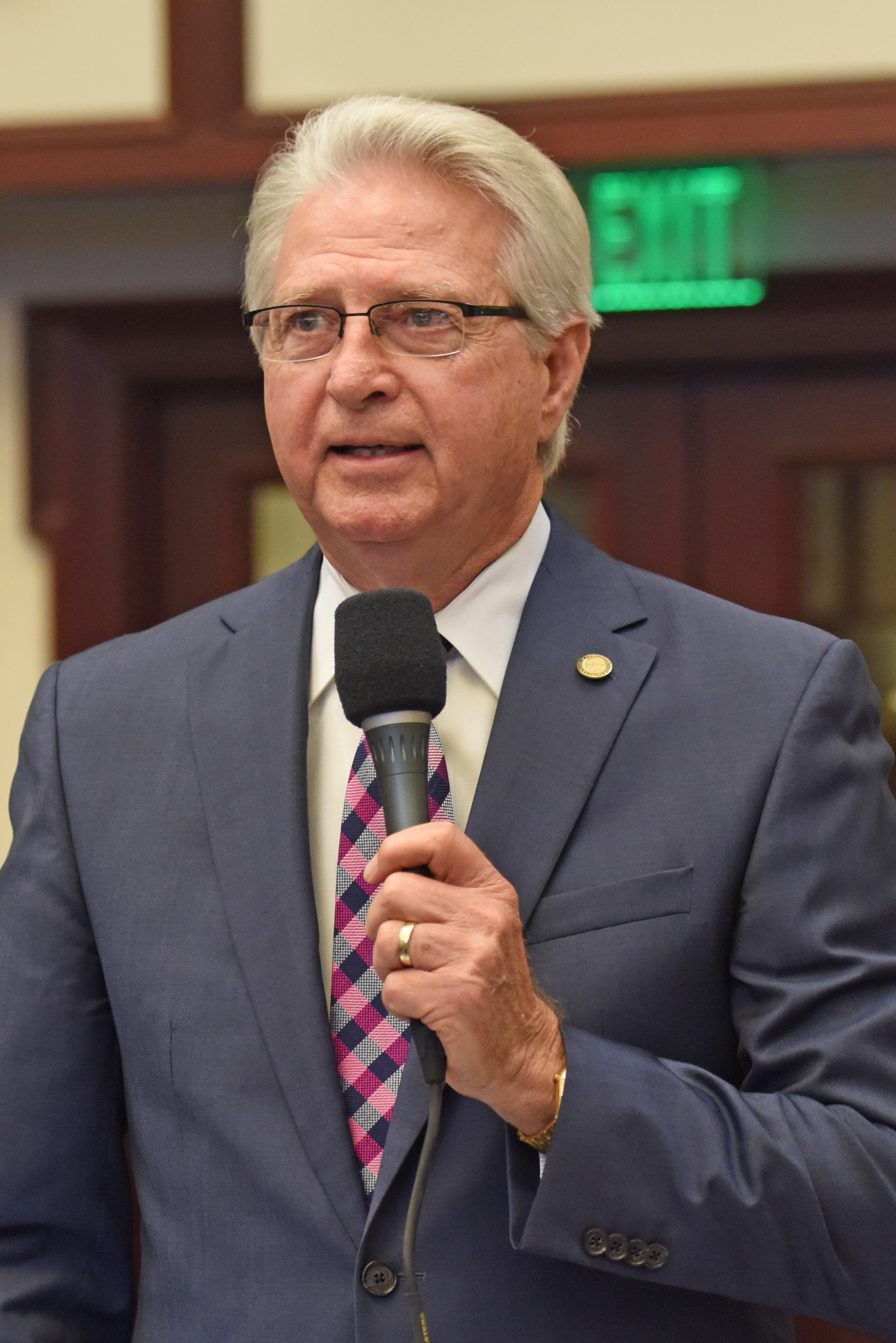

Member of the Florida House of Representatives from the 22nd district
- In office November 6, 2012 – November 3, 2020
- Preceded by: Redistricted
- Succeeded by: Joe Harding

Personal details
- Born: January 12, 1948 (age 78) Fitzgerald, Georgia
- Party: Republican
- Spouse: Michelle Stone
- Children: 2 grown children
- Education: Cook High School
- Profession: Small business owner

Charlie Stone (born January 12, 1948) is a Republican politician from Florida. He served two terms on the Marion County Commission from 2004 to 2012 and four terms in the Florida House of Representatives from 2012 to 2020, representing the 22nd District, which includes Levy County and southwestern Marion County.

== Early life and career ==
Stone was born in Fitzgerald, Georgia, and graduated from Cook High School in Adel, Georgia. He did not attend college, instead moving to Marion County, where he started Stone Petroleum Products, a wholesale distributor of petroleum products in Ocala. In 2004, Stone ran for a position on the Marion County Commission from District 5, and he was elected with 55% of the vote over Democratic nominee Mike Sizemore. He was re-elected unopposed in 2008, and served as the Chairman of the Commission during his final term.

== Florida House of Representatives ==
In 2012, following the reconfiguration of the Florida House of Representatives districts, Stone opted to run in the newly created 22nd District. Though he had already decided not to seek a third term on the County Commission and imagined that he would retire from politics altogether, the fact that the newly created district was a natural fit for him prompted him to run for the legislature, noting, "I anticipated riding off into the sunset and doing whatever in the community I was going to do," but that the new district was "my backyard." Stone won the nomination of the Republican Party uncontested, and had no opponent in the general election either, and was thus elected to his first term in the House unopposed. In 2014, Stone was re-elected to his second term in the legislature without opposition.

While in the legislature, Stone joined with State Senator Dorothy Hukill to sponsor legislation that would authorize a "tax break for indoor agriculture" and "incorporate 'indoor agricultural enterprises' into the list of industries that are identified by Enterprise Florida as 'high impact.'"

Stone was term-limited from the House in 2020, after serving four terms.

In 2023, after incumbent representative Joe Harding resigned after being indicted for wire fraud and money laundering, Stone ran in the ensuing special election, but finished third in the Republican primary.
