= Stan Gerdes =

American politician

Member of the Texas House of Representatives from the 17th district
- Incumbent
- Assumed office January 10, 2023
- Preceded by: John Cyrier

Personal details
- Born: January 23, 1986 (age 40)
- Party: Republican
- Spouse: Samantha
- Education: University of Texas at Austin
- Occupation: Consultant

Stan Gerdes /ˈɡɜːrdiːz/ (born January 23, 1986) is an American politician. He serves as a Republican member for the 17th district of the Texas House of Representatives.

== Life and career ==
Gerdes is a fifth-generation Texan who grew up in Waco, Texas, and graduated in 2008 from the University of Texas. By 2014, he was working in former Texas Governor Rick Perry's office, and then transitioned to director of scheduling for one of Perry's political action committees (PACs) and staff on Perry's 2016 campaign for the Republican nomination for president. In 2017, Gerdes was a senior advisor for the United States Department of Energy, serving under Rick Perry, who was the US Secretary of Energy from 2017–2019.

In May 2021, Gerdes was elected to the Smithville City Council. In December 2021, he was a candidate in the Republican primary election for the 17th district of the Texas House of Representatives.

In May 2022, Gerdes defeated Paul Pape in the Republican primary election. In August 2022, he filed a lawsuit to remove Linda Curtis from the general election ballot. His lawsuit was rejected by a judge. In November 2022, he defeated Madeline Eden and Curtis in the general election, winning 64 percent of the votes. He succeeded John Cyrier. He assumed his office in 2023.

In 2025, Gerdes sponsored legislation, the "FURRIES Act", to ban "non-human behavior" by students. When pressed, Gerdes could not find an example of such behavior happening.

Texas House of Representatives
Preceded by John Cyrier	Member of the Texas House of Representatives from the 17th district 2023–present	Incumbent
