= Parental consent =

Law requiring the consent of a parent before their child engages in a certain activity

Parental consent laws (also known as parental involvement laws) in some countries require that one or more parents consent to or be notified before their minor child can legally engage in certain activities.

Parental consent may refer to:

- A parent's right to give consent, or be informed, before their minor child undergoes medical treatment. See informed consent for such legislation in general, or minors and abortion for legislation relating specifically to abortion.

- Some jurisdictions stop short of requiring parental consent for abortion but require parental notification.

- The parental rights movement, which seeks to require parents to either be notified or give consent if their minor child wishes to go by a different name or different gender pronouns at school.
- A parent's right to give consent before their minor child undergoes body modification such as piercing or tattooing.
- A parent's right to consent to their minor child marrying before they reach marriageable age.
- A parent's right to be involved in their minor child's education, including the right to approve or disapprove of certain curricula, or to consent to extracurricular activities and field trips.
