= Texas's 17th House of Representatives district =

American legislative district

Texas's 17th State House of Representatives district
Representative
Stan Gerdes; R
- Demographics: 54.1% White; 7.7% Black; 34.9% Hispanic
- Population (2020) • Voting age: 202,973; 153,215

The 17th district of the Texas House of Representatives contains Bastrop and parts of San Marcos, Rockdale, and Cameron. It contains all of Bastrop County. The current representative is Stan Gerdes, who has represented the district since 2023.
