= Stop the Sexualization of Children Act =

Proposed US legislation

- Long title: A Bill To prohibit the use of Federal funds to develop, implement, facilitate, or fund any sexually-oriented program, event, or literature for children under the age of 10, and for other purposes.
- Nicknames: National Don't Say Gay bill

Legislative history
- Introduced in the House of Representatives as H.R. 9197 by Mike Johnson (R‑LA) on October 18, 2022; Committee consideration by House Committees on Oversight and Reform, and Education and Labor

The Stop the Sexualization of Children Act was United States federal legislation introduced in the 117th Congress which would prohibit all federally-funded institutions from using such funds to instruct children on "sexually-orientated" materials. Considered to be a national version of the Florida Parental Rights in Education Act, likewise to the Florida legislation, it has been described as the national Don't Say Gay bill by opponents and commentators. The bill was introduced by Republican Representative Mike Johnson of Louisiana, and 32 additional Republican members of Congress cosponsored the bill.

== Background ==
While not uniformly shared across the Republican Party, many state party platforms and members of the party at large have taken a position against same-sex marriage and LGBT+ rights, especially GOP members more closely related to the Christian right.

In 2022, legislation originally introduced earlier by Florida state senator Dennis Baxley was passed by both houses of the Florida legislature and signed into law by governor Ron DeSantis. The GOP and DeSantis have defended what became known by opponents as the Don't Say Gay law, stating that parents need more authority over what their schools teach and that children at their age should not need to worry about their sexual orientation. Criticism against the bill was far and wide, with protests chanting "We Say Gay" and "Do Say Gay" appearing across the country, legal challenges attempting to overturn the bill, and the Walt Disney Company battling DeSantis in a widely publicized feud which involved Florida's state government repealing the Reedy Creek Improvement Act and Disney's special rights over the land containing Walt Disney World.

== Provisions ==
The bill would have prohibited institutions that receive any federal funding from "sexually-oriented" programs, events, and literature for children under 10. The bill additionally would have prohibited federal institutions from hosting or promoting literature and works which themselves promote sexual orientation. Any organization that would've violated the bill multiple times in any given five-year period would have lost access to federal funds for three years.

Similar to the Texas Heartbeat Act, the proposed legislation contained a private right of action clause which would have enabled parents and guardians to sue government officials, agencies, and entities which receive federal funding if such institutions were responsible for "exposing" children to sexual materials.

Section 2 of the legislation attracted attention for the findings that Johnson had mentioned in the bill, specifically subsections 4 and 5, which specifically criticized libraries which host story hours hosted by drag queens as well as burlesque shows and promotions.

== Support and opposition ==
Johnson's bill has been supported by 32 other GOP members of the House of Representatives, including Lauren Boebert. Johnson states that this legislation is necessary to prevent the opposing Democratic Party from continuing on what he describes as a "misguided crusade" to promote gender identity and LGBT+ ideas to the youth.

The bill has been criticized by the Human Rights Campaign, which director David Stacy describes as extremist Republicans' "latest cruel attempt to stigmatize and marginalize the community, not in an attempt to solve actual problems but only to rile up their extremist base". LGBT+ activist Alejandra Caraballo has additionally slammed Section 2 of the bill, a section which she specifically calls the legislation's definition of "sexually explicit" to include LGBTQ people as "dehumanizing".

Bay Windows publisher Sue O'Connell suggested addressing sexualization in child beauty pageants rather than banning drag shows, which she does not believe sexualize children.
