= Family Equality =

American LGBTQ advocacy group

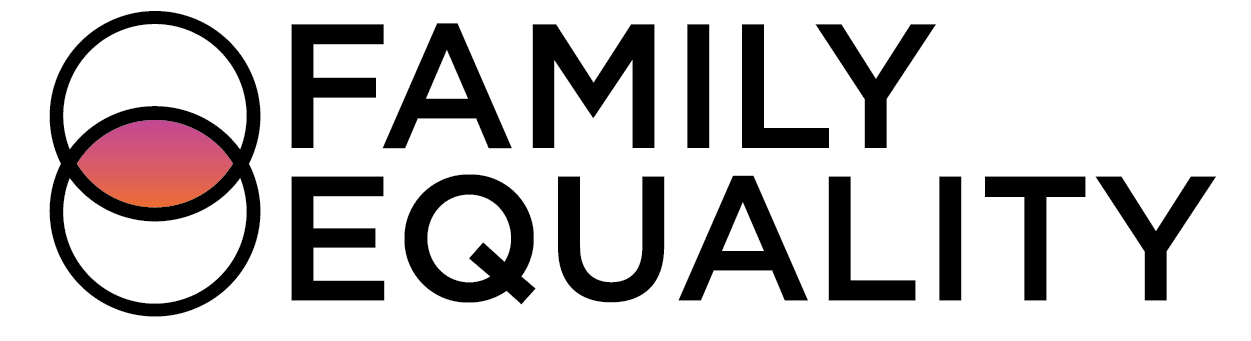
- Formation: 1979/10/14
- Type: 501(c)(3) nonprofit
- Headquarters: New York, NY
- President & CEO: Darra Gordon
- Website: www.familyequality.org

Family Equality (formerly Family Pride and Family Equality Council) is a national American nonprofit organization whose mission is to advance legal and lived equality for lesbian, gay, bisexual, transgender and queer (LGBTQ) families, and for those who wish to form them, through building community, changing hearts and minds, and driving policy change.

Family Equality is dedicated to protecting and advancing the freedoms of LGBTQ+ families through advocacy, community building, and education.

== History ==
In 1979 a group of gay fathers formed the group that would eventually become Family Equality. Originally called the Gay Fathers Coalition, in 1986 this fathers’ group expanded to include lesbian mothers, prompting a name change to the Gay and Lesbian Parents Coalition International (GLPCI), a chapter-based organization. In 1998, GLPCI changed its name to the Family Pride Coalition in order to include bisexual and transgender parents. In 2007, in order to better capture the full breadth and scope of their mission, Family Pride changed its name to the Family Equality Council and in 2019 updated the name to Family Equality.

In 2006, Family Equality collaborated with the University of Pennsylvania on a two-day symposium for professionals who work with households headed by same-sex couples and their advocates. The symposium led to the creation of an online databank of resources for same-sex couples with children.

Family Equality launched an initiative called "The Outspoken Generation" in April 2012, with young adult children of LGBT parents as its spokespersons. The co-chairs were Zach Wahls, the son of a lesbian couple who came to public attention after his testimony before an Iowa legislative hearing went viral on YouTube, and Ella Robinson, the daughter of New Hampshire Episcopal Bishop Gene Robinson.

== Outspoken Voices Podcast ==
The Outspoken Voices Podcast is produced by Family Equality and hosted by Emily McGranachan with co-host Dakota Fine. This podcast is "by and for LGBTQ+ parents, people with LGBTQ+ parents, grandparents and everyone else who is part of our family journeys." Outspoken Voices aired their first episode on January 10, 2017 and continues to release new episodes monthly. The hosts discusses numerous important topics with guests to create episodes that are specifically catered for LGBTQ+ families and LGBTQ+ individuals that plan to have families.

== Sources ==
- Philip Gambone, Travels in a Gay Nation: Portraits of LGBTQ Americans (Madison, University of Wisconsin Press, 2010), ISBN 978-0-299-23684-7
