= Elizabeth F. Schwartz =

American attorney, author, and activist

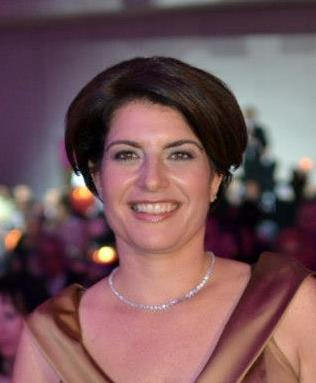
- Elizabeth F. Schwartz
- Born: Elizabeth Frances Schwartz; November 20, 1971 (age 54); Miami Beach, Florida, U.S.
- Education: University of Pennsylvania (BA); University of Miami (JD)
- Occupations: Attorney, author, advocate
- Spouse: Lydia Martin

Elizabeth Frances Schwartz (born November 20, 1971) is an American attorney, author, and advocate for the legal rights of the lesbian, gay, bisexual, and transgender (LGBT) community.

== Life and career ==
Schwartz served as co-counsel on the case challenging Florida's same-sex marriage ban brought by the National Center for Lesbian Rights (NCLR) on behalf of six same-sex couples seeking the right to marry (Pareto v. Ruvin). This lawsuit resulted in Miami-Dade Circuit Judge Sarah Zabel's finding that Florida's same-sex marriage ban deprived same-sex couples due process and equal protection under the law, and in the ordering of Miami-Dade County to issue marriage licenses to same-sex couples.

Schwartz has also filed suit in Florida for fair issuance of birth certificates to same-sex married couples and handled the first case for same-sex couple divorce.

In addition to her legal work, Elizabeth F. Schwartz has supported the LGBT community through local and national lectures on the importance of LGBT couples protecting their families through second parent adoption and estate planning. She writes about issues concerning the LGBT community for the Huffington Post.

Schwartz is featured in The Day It Snowed In Miami (2014) a 2014 Emmy-nominated documentary that traces the political activism behind an equal-rights statute in Miami.

Elizabeth received her Bachelor of Arts from the University of Pennsylvania in 1993 and her Juris Doctor, cum laude, from the University of Miami in 1997. She started practicing law in 1997.

Elizabeth Schwartz was born in Miami Beach and currently lives with her wife, writer Lydia Martin, in Miami, FL.

== Publications ==
- "LGBT Issues in Surrogacy" in the Handbook of Gestational Surrogacy, ed. E. Scott Sills (Cambridge University Press, 2016)
- Before I Do: A Legal Guide to Marriage, Gay and Otherwise (The New Press, 2016, ISBN 978-1-62097-154-3)
- Transgender Discrimination, Trial Magazine (American Association for Justice, Oct. 2016)
- Out and About: LGBT Experience in the Profession, Trailblazing Advocacy (American Bar Association, 2015)

== Memberships ==
- National board SAGE (Services & Advocacy for GLBT Elders) (co-chair)
- National Family Law Advisory Council of NCLR (National Center for Lesbian Rights)
- National Leadership Council of the National Family Law Advisory Council of NCLR (National Center for Lesbian Rights)
- Board of directors, GLBT Projects Fund of the Miami Foundation

== Awards ==
- Community Award, Miami-Dade Gay & Lesbian Chamber of Commerce, 2005
- Sookie Williams Award, Dade County Bar Association, 2007
- Best LGBT Lawyers Under 40, National LGBT Bar Association, 2010
- Women Worth Knowing Award, City of Miami Beach Commission p, 2010
- Voice for Equality Award, Equality Florida, the statewide LGBT rights group, 2011
- Iron Arrow Membership, University of Miami 2012 (their highest honor)
- Eddy McIntyre Community Service Award, National LGBTQ Task Force, 2012
- C. Clyde Atkins Award, ACLU of Florida, 2015
