= Glosson =

Glosson is a surname. Notable people with the surname include:

- Buster Glosson (born 1942), deputy chief of staff, U.S. Air Force, Washington D.C.
- Clyde Glosson (born 1947), former American football wide receiver
- Lonnie Glosson (1908–2001), American country musician, songwriter, and radio personality
- William Glosson (1937–1996), American gridiron football player

== See also ==
- Glisson
- Glossen
