= William Stockton (politician) =

American politician

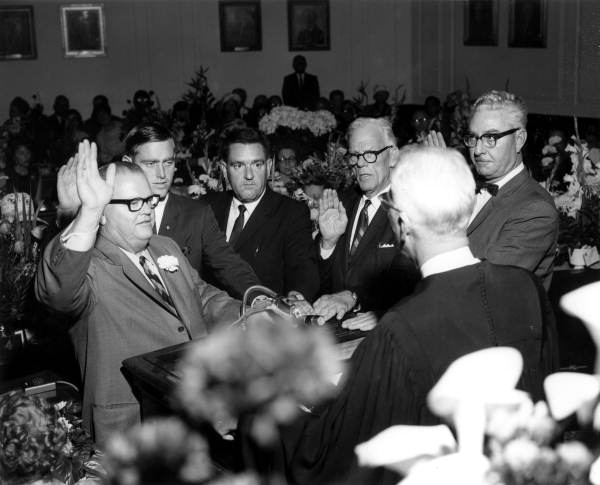
- Stockton with L. K. Edwards Jr., Dennis J. Patrick O'Grady, Ralph R. Clayton, Verle Pope and B. Campbell Thornal, 1967

Member of the Florida Senate from the 11th district
- In office 1967–1968
- Preceded by: Bill Young
- Succeeded by: Bill Beaufort

Personal details
- Born: November 20, 1918 Atlanta, Georgia, U.S.
- Died: August 20, 1985 (aged 66)
- Party: Republican

William T. Stockton Jr. (November 20, 1918 – August 20, 1985) was an American politician. He served as a Republican member for the 11th district of the Florida Senate.
