= Mary Grizzle =

American politician (1921–2006)

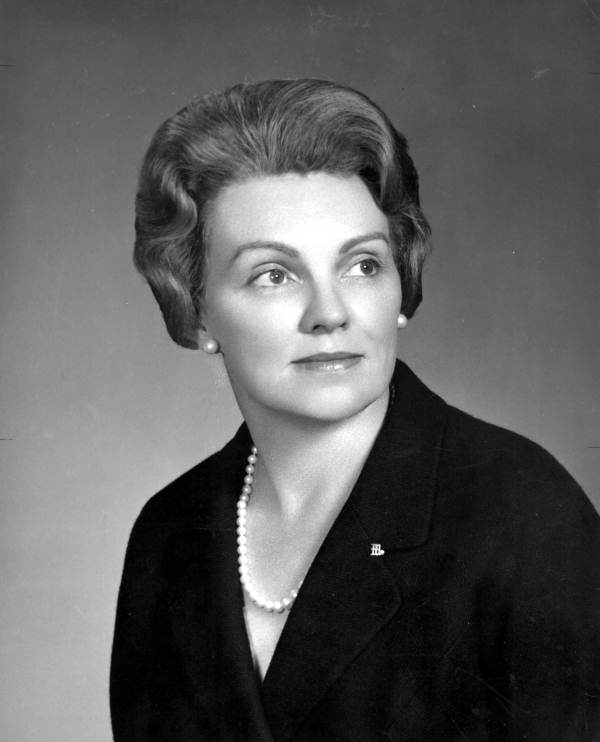

Member of the Florida Senate from the 20th district
- In office 1978–1992
- Preceded by: Henry Sayler
- Succeeded by: Charlie Crist

Member of the Florida House of Representatives from the 47th district
- In office 1967–1972
- Preceded by: District created
- Succeeded by: Bill Nelson

Member of the Florida House of Representatives from the Pinellas County district
- In office 1962–1967
- Preceded by: Multi-member district
- Succeeded by: District abolished

Personal details
- Born: Mary R. Grizzle; August 19, 1921 Ironton, Ohio, U.S.
- Died: November 9, 2006 (aged 85) Redington Beach, Florida, U.S.
- Party: Republican
- Spouse: Ben Grizzle
- Children: 6

Mary R. Grizzle (née Pearson; August 19, 1921 – November 9, 2006), was a legislator and advocate of the Equal Rights Amendment, who served in both houses of the Florida Legislature. She was the first Republican woman elected to the legislature of Florida.

== Early life ==
She grew up near Ironton, Ohio, where she was born. Grizzle went to business college in Portsmouth, Ohio. She worked for an insurance business. After World War II started, she moved to Washington, D.C., and worked for the War Production Board. She met Ben Grizzle and they got married. They moved to Florida in 1949. Grizzle was involved with the PTA and with the Republican Party. She served as town commissioner for Belleair, Florida.

== Career ==
In 1963, she was elected to the Florida House of Representatives. From 1974 to 1978 she served as House Republican Leader Pro-Tempore, making her the first woman in Florida elected to a leadership position. In 1978, she was elected to the Florida Senate.

She introduced and passed the Married Women Property Rights Act, which became law in 1970, giving married women in Florida, for the first time, the right to own property solely in their names and to transfer that property without their husbands' signatures. She also sponsored legislation admitting women to jury duty, providing equal pay for equal work, providing maternity leave for teachers, and requiring state licensing for child care centers. In 1972, she co-sponsored a bill that set strict standards on sewage dumped into Tampa Bay.

== Legacy ==
In 1990, the Florida Senate passed a resolution naming her "Dean of the Legislature" because she had the longest continuous term of service there. She stayed in the Senate until 1992. In 2003, she was inducted into the Florida Women's Hall of Fame.

Grizzle died on November 9, 2006, in Redington Beach, aged 85.

The Mary Grizzle Building, a business center, is located in Largo, Florida.

Florida House of Representatives
Preceded by Multi-member district	Member of the Florida House of Representatives from the Pinellas County district 1962–1967	Succeeded by District abolished
Preceded by District created	Member of the Florida House of Representatives from the 47th district 1967–1972	Succeeded by Bill Nelson
Preceded by William Fleece	Member of the Florida House of Representatives from the 53rd district 1972–1978	Succeeded by Peter M. Dunbar
Florida Senate
Preceded by Henry Sayler	Member of the Florida Senate from the 20th district 1978–1992	Succeeded by Charlie Crist
