= Op. 163 =

In music, Op. 163 stands for Opus number 163. Compositions that are assigned this number include:

- Diabelli – Jugendfreuden
- Saint-Saëns – Marche dédiée aux étudiants d'Alger
- Schubert – String Quintet
- Strauss – Glossen
