= Glisson =

Glisson is a surname. Notable people with the surname include:

- Dorothy Glisson (1912–2001), American politician
- Francis Glisson (died 1677), British physician, anatomist, and writer
- Gordon Glisson (1930–1997), American jockey
- James Glisson (born 1939), American politician
- Michael Glisson, United States Army general
- Oliver S. Glisson (1809–1890), United States Navy admiral
