= Leonard Wood (disambiguation) =

Leonard Wood (1860–1927) was Chief of Staff of the U.S. Army, Military Governor of Cuba and Governor General of the Philippines.

Leonard Wood may also refer to:

- Leonard Wood (Prince Edward Island politician) (1865–1957), farmer, trader and political figure
- Leonard V. Wood, member of the Florida House of Representatives
- Leonard Wood (racing) (born 1934), NASCAR co-owner of Wood Brothers Racing
- Leonard Wood (footballer), English footballer
- Len Wood (born 1942), Canadian politician
- Fort Leonard Wood, Missouri, U.S. military base
- USS Leonard Wood

== See also ==
- Leonard Woods (disambiguation)
