= Florida's 33rd House of Representatives district =

American legislative district

Florida's 33rd State House of Representatives district
Representative
Monique Miller; R–Melbourne Beach

Florida's 33rd House district elects one member of the Florida House of Representatives. Its current representative is Republican Monique Miller.

== Representatives from 1967 to the present ==
Representative	Party	Years of service	Hometown	Notes
James N. Beck	Democratic	1967 - November 5, 1968	East Palatka	
James Glisson	Republican	November 5, 1968 – November 7, 1972	Eustis	
Eugene Mooney	Republican	November 7, 1972 – November 5, 1974	Orlando	
Bob Hattaway	Democratic	November 5, 1974 – November 2, 1982	Altamonte Springs	
Marilyn Evans-Jones	Republican	November 2, 1982 – November 4, 1986	Melbourne	
Harry Goode	Democratic	November 4, 1986 – November 3, 1992	Melbourne	Redistricted to the 31st district
Marvin Couch	Republican	November 3, 1992 – March 1, 1996	Oviedo	Resigned on March 1, 1996
Tom Feeney	Republican	November 5, 1996 – November 5, 2002	Oviedo	Served as Speaker Pro Tempore (2000, 2001, 2002)
Sandy Adams	Republican	November 5, 2002 – November 2, 2010	Orlando	
Jason Brodeur	Republican	November 2, 2010 – November 6, 2012	Sanford	
H. Marlene O'Toole	Republican	November 6, 2012 – November 8, 2016	Lady Lake	
Don Hahnfeldt	Republican	November 8, 2016 - December 24, 2017	The Villages	Died in office on December 24, 2017
vacant		December 24, 2017 - November 6, 2018		
Brett Hage	Republican	November 6, 2018 – November 8, 2022	Oxford	
Randy Fine	Republican	November 8, 2022 – November 19, 2024	Melbourne Beach	District changed from The Villages to southern Brevard County as a result of redistricting
Monique Miller	Republican	November 19, 2024 – present		

== See also ==
- List of members of the Florida House of Representatives from Brevard County, Florida
