= Jeff Holcomb =

American politician

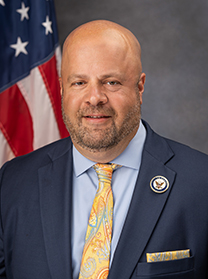

Member of the Florida House of Representatives from the 53rd district
- Incumbent
- Assumed office November 8, 2022
- Preceded by: Randy Fine

Personal details
- Party: Republican
- Education: University of Maryland, BA Economics, American Military University, MA Intelligence Studies
- Website: https://jeffholcomb.org/

Jeff Holcomb is an American politician and member of the Republican Party. He represents District 53 in the Florida House of Representatives and lives in Spring Hill, Florida.

Holcomb is a Lieutenant for the United States Navy Reserve, from 2006 to Present Day. Holcomb was Deployed for Operation Inherent Resolve; supported Operation Enduring Freedom, Operation Iraqi Freedom, and Operation Resolute Support.

Holcomb studied at University of Maryland, Baltimore, earning a bachelor's degree in economics, and the American Military University, earning a master's with honors in intelligence studies.

Holcomb moved to Florida in 2002.
