= Monique Miller =

Monique Miller may refer to:

- Monique Miller (actress)
- Monique Miller (politician)
