= Senator Clayton =

Senator Clayton may refer to:

== Members of the United States Senate ==
- John M. Clayton (1796–1856), U.S. Senator from Delaware from 1829 to 1836, from 1845 to 1849, and from 1853 to 1856
- Joshua Clayton (1744–1798), U.S. Senator from Delaware in 1798
- Powell Clayton (1833–1914), U.S. Senator from Arkansas from 1871 to 1877
- Thomas Clayton (1777–1854), U.S. Senator from Delaware from 1824 to 1827 and from 1837 to 1847

== United States state senate members ==
- Augustin Smith Clayton (1783–1839), Georgia State Senate
- John M. Clayton (Arkansas politician) (1840–1889), Arkansas State Senate
- Ralph R. Clayton (1922–2006), Florida State Senate
- William C. Clayton (1831–1915), West Virginia State Senate
