= William L. Gibson =

American politician (1906–1987)

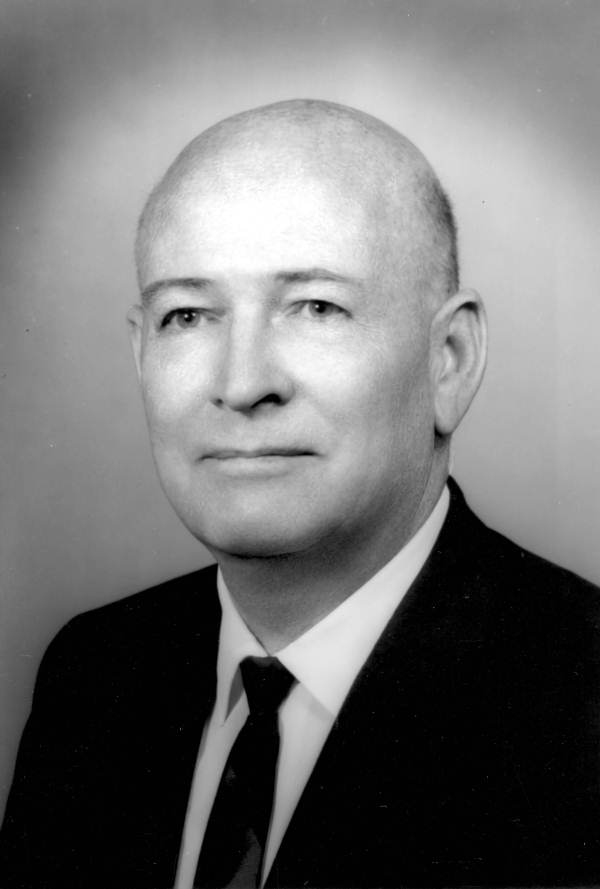
- Gibson in 1967

Member of the Florida House of Representatives from the 45th district
- In office 1967–1972
- Preceded by: District established
- Succeeded by: F. Eugene Tubbs

Member of the Florida House of Representatives from the 38th district
- In office 1972–1976
- Preceded by: Eugene Mooney
- Succeeded by: Lawrence R. Kirkwood

Personal details
- Born: October 3, 1906 Huntington, West Virginia, U.S.
- Died: May 21, 1987 (aged 80)
- Party: Democratic; Republican
- Education: University of Maryland; George Washington University

William L. Gibson (October 3, 1906 – May 21, 1987) was an American politician who served as a Republican member for the 38th and 45th district of the Florida House of Representatives.

== Life and career ==
Gibson was born in Huntington, West Virginia. He attended the University of Maryland and George Washington University.

In 1967, Gibson was elected as the first representative for the newly established 45th district of the Florida House of Representatives. He served until 1972, when he was succeeded by F. Eugene Tubbs. In the same year, he was elected to represent the 38th district, succeeding Eugene Mooney. He served until 1976, when he was succeeded by Lawrence R. Kirkwood.

== Death ==
Gibson died on May 21, 1987, at the age of 80.
