= Ralph R. Clayton =

American politician

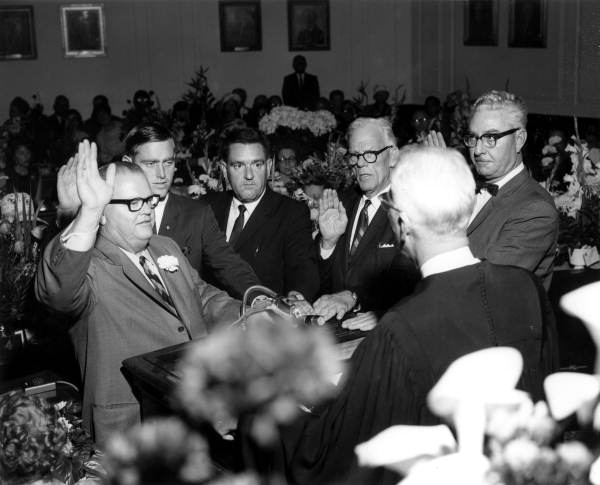
- Clayton with L. K. Edwards Jr., Dennis J. Patrick O'Grady, Verle Pope, B. Campbell Thornal and William Stockton, 1967

Member of the Florida Senate from the 14th district
- In office 1967–1968

Personal details
- Born: April 17, 1922
- Died: July 24, 2006 (aged 84)
- Party: Republican
- Education: Brevard College; Stetson University

Ralph R. Clayton (April 17, 1922 – July 24, 2006) was an American politician. He served as a Republican member for the 14th district of the Florida Senate.

== Life and career ==
Clayton attended Brevard College and Stetson University.

Clayton served in the Florida Senate from 1967 to 1968, representing the 14th district.

Clayton died on July 24, 2006, at the age of 84.
