= BlueWare =

Healthware corporation in Cadillac, Michigan

BlueWare, Inc.
- Type: Privately held
- Industry: Healthcare Information Services
- Founded: 1993
- Defunct: 2018
- Headquarters: Cadillac, Michigan
- Key people: Rose Harr, President & CEO
- Products: Software
- Revenue: Undisclosed
- Number of employees: 0 (July 2018)
- Subsidiaries: BlueLand; BlueWare International; RoseWare
- Website: http://www.bluewaregroup.com/

BlueWare, Inc. was an international strategic healthware solutions corporation located in Cadillac, Michigan, which focused on developing and marketing software products to the healthcare industry. The company was created by former IBM Healthcare and Advanced Technology Specialists and was an IBM Premier Business Partner.

== Scandal in Florida ==
In May 2012, Florida Governor Rick Scott lauded the move of BlueWare to Melbourne, Florida. It was announced that BlueWare expected to employ 190 people at an average salary of $69,000, saying “Today’s announcement is a great win for the Space Coast, as well as for the entire state.” At the time, Harr stated that “BlueWare holds 10 companies within its corporate family and we look forward to expanding our presence in healthcare, education, and government sectors”

Prior to that, in early 2012, BlueWare CEO Rose Harr met then Brevard county clerk Mitch Needelman, via Matt DuPree, a former lobbyist and business partner of Needelman. On April 6, 2012, Needelman signed a contract with RoseWare LLC, one of the 10 companies within BlueWare's "corporate family." On the day of signing, $100,000 was wired to BlueWare.

On October 27, 2012, Needelman signed a $6.1 million loan with Hewlett-Packard, despite the fact that the county clerk is not allowed under Florida law to borrow money. Needelman then wired $5,690,526 to BlueWare on November 8, 2012. On January 8, 2013, Ellis was sworn in as Brevard country clerk and continued his investigation into the dealings between Needelman and BlueWare.

Needelman and DuPree were arrested on August 15, 2013. The next day, Harr turned herself in to the Seminole County Sheriff's Office.

== Wellness Connection ==
BlueWare's Wellness Connection was a server-based electronic medical record, utilizing Computer Output to Laser Disc (COLD) imaging, document imaging, clinical multimedia imaging, with data and biomedical applications in development. The software collected data and images from various sites in a hospital or from remote sites through a modem, captured and compressed the printed patient output at the time of printing or scanning and indexed it into electronic patient records folders under the appropriate tabs. Information was stored on tape, disk drive or on an optical system and could later be called up on a character based screen or a PC.

== Awards ==
- 2007 Beacon Award finalist for Driving Patient-Centric Care
- 2007 "Top Star" business partner by the IBM Global Public Sector
- 2006 Top 50 Growing Companies in Michigan
- 2005 Best DB2 Application IBM Beacon Award
