= Brett Hage =

American politician from Florida

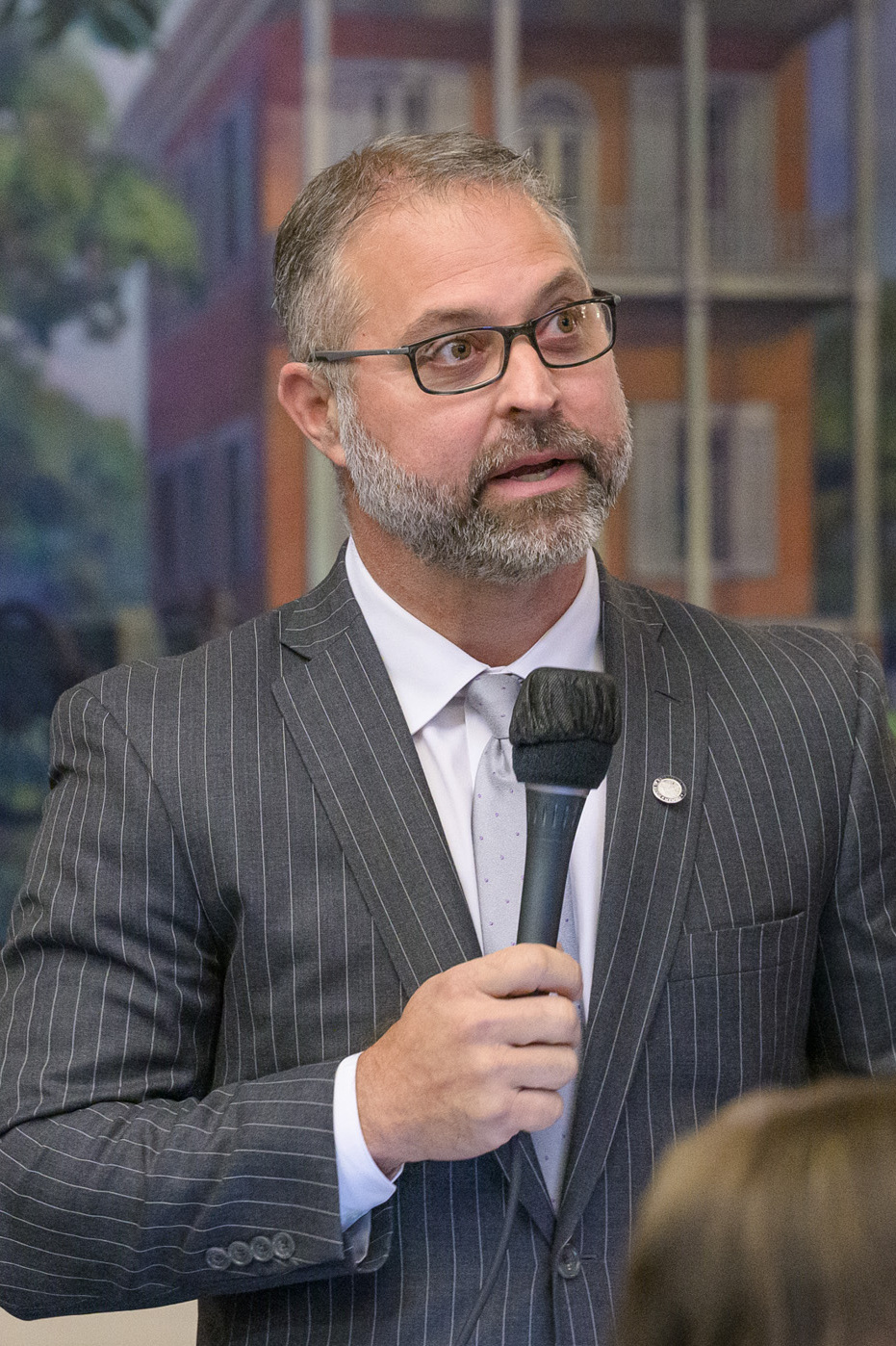

Member of the Florida House of Representatives from the 33rd district
- In office November 6, 2018 – November 3, 2022
- Preceded by: Don Hahnfeldt
- Succeeded by: Randy Fine

Personal details
- Born: October 19, 1974 (age 51)
- Party: Republican
- Education: Samford University
- Occupation: Distribution company executive
- Website: https://bretthage.com

Brett Hage (born October 19, 1974) is a Republican former member of the Florida Legislature representing the state's 33rd House district, which included Sumter County as well as parts of Lake and Marion counties, from 2018 to 2022. Hage announced in April 2022 that he would not seek reelection.

== History ==
Hage is the president of T&D Distribution, Inc., a contractor which bills itself as the "largest volume Mastic vinyl siding distributor in Florida."

== Florida House of Representatives ==
In the November 6, 2018, general election, Hage defeated Democrat Oren Miller, taking 69.5% of the vote.

=== Tenure ===
While in office, Hage was hired as vice president for residential development by The Villages, which paid him $141,000 in 2019, $350,000 in 2020, and $925,000 in 2021. In January 2021, while still employed by The Villages, Hage introduced legislation that would have the effect of protecting The Villages from a 75% increase in impact fees proposed by the Sumter County Commission.
