= William Fleece =

American politician (1935–2020)

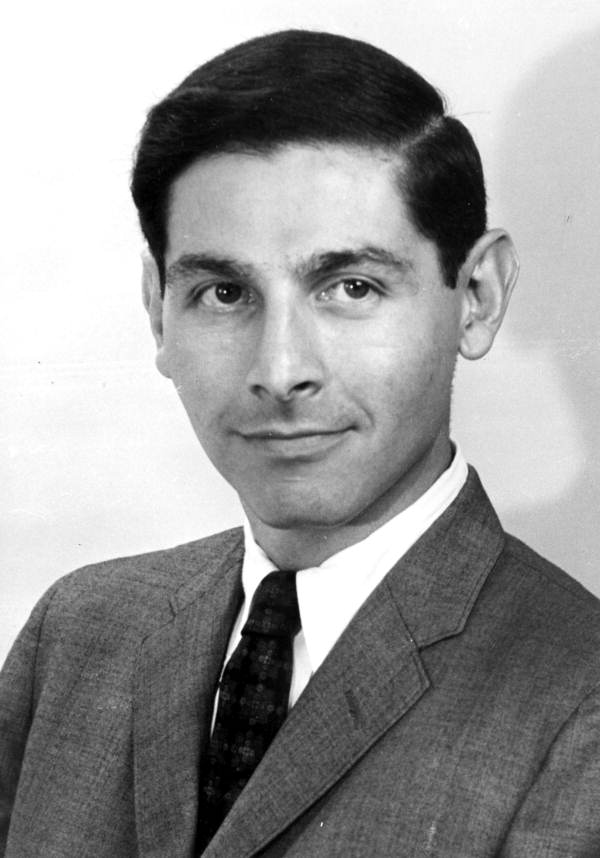

Member of the Florida House of Representatives from the 53rd district
- In office 1967–1972
- Succeeded by: Mary Grizzle

Personal details
- Born: William Harold Fleece; October 1, 1935 Pontiac, Michigan
- Died: October 27, 2020 (aged 85)
- Party: Republican; Democratic
- Spouse(s): Ellen L. Richman (divorced); Marie C. Devine (died 2009)
- Children: 3
- Education: Ohio State University (BS); Indiana University School of Law (LLB, JD)
- Occupation: lawyer

William Harold Fleece (October 1, 1935 – October 27, 2020) was an American politician and lawyer in the state of Florida.

== Biography ==
=== Early life and education ===
Fleece was born in Pontiac, Michigan.

He graduated from Wiley High School in Terre Haute, Indiana in 1953.

He graduated from Ohio State University with a Bachelor of Science in 1957 and from the Indiana University School of Law with a Master of Laws and Juris Doctor. He is also an alumnus of Indiana State University and Stetson College of Law.

=== Political career ===
He served in the Florida House of Representatives from 1967 to 1972, representing district 53. He served as a Republican, but has since switched his party affiliation to Democrat.

=== Legal career ===
He practiced law in St. Petersburg and Clearwater.

=== Personal life ===
He married Ellen L. Richman. They later divorced and he married Marie C. Devine. Marie died in 2009. He had 3 children from his marriage to Ellen. He married Anne Kantor of Tampa on October 25, 2020.

== Death ==
Fleece died on October 27, 2020.
