= John Tobia =

American politician

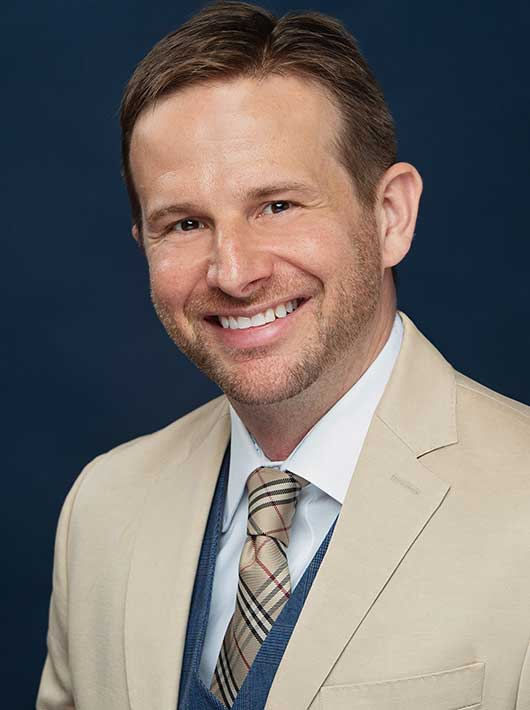

Member of the Florida House of Representatives from the 53rd district
- In office November 20, 2012 – November 8, 2016
- Preceded by: Rick Kriseman
- Succeeded by: Randy Fine

Member of the Florida House of Representatives from the 31st district
- In office November 18, 2008 – November 20, 2012
- Preceded by: Mitch Needelman
- Succeeded by: Bryan Nelson

Personal details
- Born: January 6, 1978 (age 48) Honolulu, Hawaii, U.S.
- Party: Republican
- Education: University of Florida (BA, MA)
- Profession: Professor

John Tobia (born January 6, 1978) is an American Republican Party politician who served in the Florida House of Representatives, representing the 53rd District, which includes southern Brevard County, from 2012 to 2016, previously representing the 31st District from 2008 to 2012.

== History ==
Tobia was born in Honolulu, Hawaii, and moved to the state of Florida in 1990. He attended the University of Florida, where he received both his bachelor's and master's degrees in political science. Following graduation, he began working as a professor at Valencia College, teaching introductory political science courses. He resigned from his tenured teaching position at Valencia College following an investigation that revealed he used county staff to assist with his coursework. The investigation, initiated after allegations surfaced during a criminal probe, found that Tobia had employed legislative aides for various class-related tasks over the past decade, including grading, creating course materials, and communicating with students.

The college's review indicated serious policy violations, noting that staff members accessed sensitive student information and communicated with students without proper disclosure. Despite Tobia's claims that staff involvement was minimal, evidence suggested extensive contributions from non-college employees to his teaching materials.

Tobia, who had taught at Valencia since 2001, was placed on paid administrative leave in August 2024, and he submitted his resignation on October 15, ending his over 20-year tenure at the college. His political career has also faced challenges, having lost a primary election and being ineligible for reelection due to term limits.

The report highlighted a pattern of misconduct and disregard for professional standards, contradicting Tobia's public persona as a fiscal watchdog. The investigation concluded with no criminal charges filed against him.

== Florida House of Representatives ==
When incumbent State Representative Mitch Needelman was unable to seek re-election in 2008 due to term limits, Tobia ran to succeed him in the 31st District, which stretched from Malabar to South Patrick Shores. He faced Jason Steele, Ronald Stump, and Ken Babington in the Republican primary, and emerged narrowly victorious, winning 32% of the vote to Steele's 31%, Stump's 22%, and Babington's 15%, despite facing allegations that he allowed his college students to "skip their final exam...if they would volunteer for his campaign". He advanced to the general election, where he was elected unopposed. In 2010, he was challenged in the primary by Indialantic City Councilwoman Lori Halbert, who accused him over the course of the campaign of committing acts of vandalism against her, including stealing her campaign signs, trespassing on her property, and flattening the tires of someone parked at her house, charges that Tobia denied. He defeated Halbert by 193 votes, winning 51% of the vote to Halbert's 49%. In the general election, he faced Jodi James, the Democratic nominee. The Orlando Sentinel roundly criticized both candidates, declaring that "voters in this Brevard County district deserve better than Republican Rep. John Tobia", in part because he made "inappropriate comments about women in his lectures." However, James had a prior conviction for drug trafficking, causing them to reluctantly endorse the incumbent for re-election. Tobia defeated James in a landslide, winning 62% of the vote.

In 2012, when legislative districts were redrawn, Tobia was drawn into the 53rd District, which included most of the territory that he previously represented. He was challenged in the Republican primary by Tres Holton and Laureen Trent, whom he defeated with 52% of the vote. In the general election, he encountered Democratic nominee John Paul Alvarez. Florida Today endorsed him for re-election, praising his "independent streak" and his "support of education issues," while noting that Alvarez was not as informed on state issues. Tobia narrowly defeated Alvarez on election night, winning 53% of the vote to Alvarez's 47%.

According to the Washington Post, Tobia and Congressman Matt Gaetz were the only two members of the Florida House to vote against the 2015 revenge porn bill. Tobia and Gaetz had previously been roommates in Tallahassee.
