= Bill Beaufort =

American politician

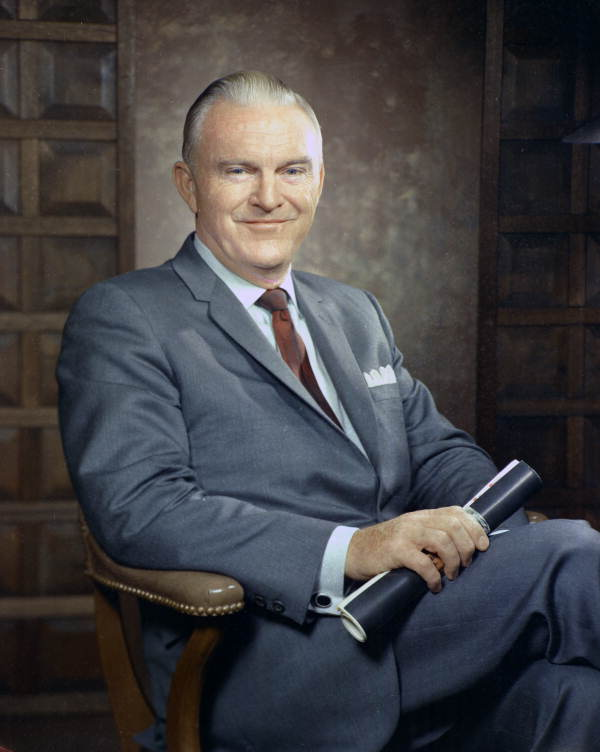
- Beaufort in 1967

Member of the Florida Senate from the 11th district
- In office November 5, 1968 – November 7, 1972
- Preceded by: William Stockton
- Succeeded by: James Glisson

Personal details
- Born: July 24, 1913 Graniteville, South Carolina, U.S.
- Died: 2000 (aged 86–87)
- Party: Democratic

C. William "Bill" Beaufort (July 24, 1913 – 2000) was an American politician. He served as a Democratic member for the 11th district of the Florida Senate.

== Life and career ==
Beaufort was born July 24, 1913, in Graniteville, South Carolina.

Beaufort was chairperson of the Florida Development Commission.

In 1968, Beaufort was elected to the Florida Senate, succeeding William Stockton. He served until 1972, when he was succeeded by James Glisson.

Beaufort died in 2000.
