= Leonard Woods =

Leonard Woods may refer to:

- Leonard Woods, black American man lynched by a mob in 1927, see Lynching of Leonard Woods
- Leonard Woods (theologian) (1774–1854), American theologian
- Leonard Woods (college president) (1807–1878), his son, president of Bowdoin College
- Leonard Woods (sculptor) (1919-2014), Canadian sculptor

== See also ==
- Leonard Wood (disambiguation)
