= Marvin Couch =

American politician

Member of the Florida House of Representatives from the 33rd district
- In office November 3, 1992 – March 1, 1996
- Preceded by: Harry Goode
- Succeeded by: Tom Feeney

Personal details
- Party: Republican
- Children: 6

Marvin R. Couch is an American politician. He served as a Republican member for the 33rd district of the Florida House of Representatives.

Couch was chairman of the Orange County Republican Party. In 1992, he won the election for the 33rd district of the Florida House of Representatives. Couch succeeded politician, Harry Goode. He resigned in March 1996.
