= James N. Beck =

American politician

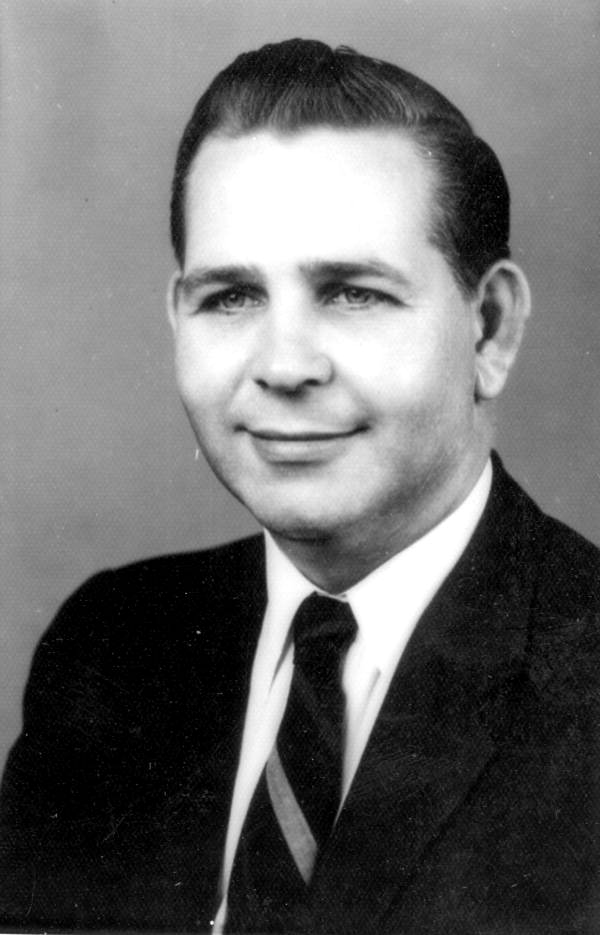
- Beck in 1961

Member of the Florida House of Representatives from the 33rd district
- In office 1967 – November 5, 1968
- Preceded by: District established
- Succeeded by: James Glisson

Personal details
- Born: November 4, 1923 Pine Castle, Florida, U.S.
- Died: February 10, 1973 (aged 49)
- Party: Democratic

James N. Beck (November 4, 1923 – February 10, 1973) was an American politician. He served as a Democratic member for the 33rd district of the Florida House of Representatives.

Beck was born in Pine Castle, Florida. In 1967 Beck became the first member for the newly established 33rd district of the Florida House of Representatives, serving until 1968.

Beck died in February 1973, at the age of 49.
