= Harry Goode (politician) =

American politician (1938–2013)

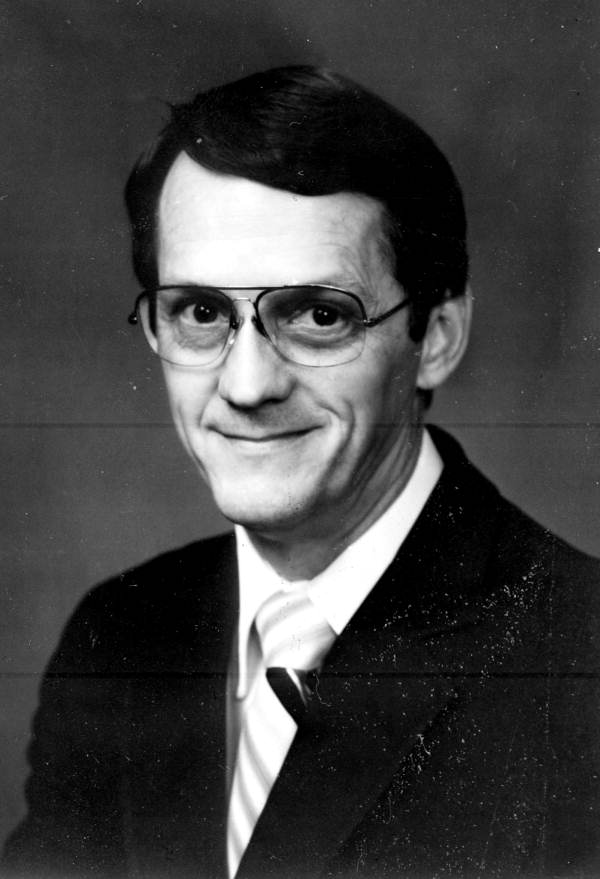

51st and 54th Mayor of Melbourne, Florida
- In office November 13, 1979 – November 4, 1986
- Preceded by: Vernon L. Dicks
- Succeeded by: Joseph F. Mullins Jr.
- In office November 2, 2004 – November 6, 2012
- Preceded by: John A. Buckley
- Succeeded by: Kathleen Meehan

Member of the Florida House of Representatives from the 33rd district
- In office November 4, 1986 – November 3, 1992
- Preceded by: Marilyn Evans-Jones
- Succeeded by: Marvin Couch

Member of the Florida House of Representatives from the 31st district
- In office November 3, 1992 – November 7, 2000
- Preceded by: Charlie Roberts
- Succeeded by: Mitch Needelman

Personal details
- Born: March 6, 1938 Melbourne, Florida
- Died: December 28, 2013 (aged 75) Melbourne, Florida
- Party: Democratic, Republican (switched on April 27, 1998)
- Spouse: Linda (deceased)
- Children: Harry C. Goode, III
- Education: Florida Southern College, Rollins College
- Occupation: Sporting goods merchant

Military service
- Branch/service: United States Army
- Years of service: 1961–1963

Harry C. Goode Jr. (March 6, 1938 – December 28, 2013) was a six-term mayor of Melbourne, Florida from 1979 to 1986 and 2004 to 2012. He was a member of the Florida House of Representatives for 14 years. He represented the 33rd district from 1986 to 1992, and the 31st district from 1992 to 2000. He served as a Democrat until April 27, 1998, when he switched parties and became a Republican. At the time of his death, he served on the Melbourne City Council, representing District 3.

== Early life and family ==
Goode was the son of Harry C. Goode Sr., who served on the Melbourne City Council and Katherine Goode. He was the grandson of Captain Alexander J. Goode. He was the great-grandson of Richard W. Goode, who served as the 12th mayor of Melbourne in 1905. He was the second-great-grandson of John Goode, one of the first settlers of Melbourne.

He was born in Melbourne, and was a graduate of Melbourne High School. He also attended Florida Southern College.

He served in the United States Army from 1961 to 1963.

He was owner and President of Harry Goode's Outdoor Shop on East New Haven Avenue until his retirement.

== Political career ==
He was elected mayor on November 13, 1979 and served until 1986. He was a member of the Florida League of Cities from 1979 to 1986. He was a member of the US Conference of Mayors from 1980 to 1986. He was a member of the Florida House of Representatives representing the 33rd district from 1986 to 1992 and the 31st district from 1992 to 2000.

He served as a Democrat until April 27, 1998, when he switched parties and became a Republican.

He was an unsuccessful candidate for the Florida Senate from the 15th district in 2000. He was an unsuccessful candidate for the Florida Senate from the 24th district in 2002.

He was elected mayor again on November 2, 2004 and served until 2012.

He served on the Melbourne City Council representing District 3 until his death on December 28, 2013.

== Associations ==
- Florida Institute of Technology Corporation, Board of Directors
- Space Coast Science Center, Board of Directors
- Space Coast Early Intervention Center, Advisory Board
- Friends of the Scrub Jay, Board Member
- Florida-Columbia Partners

== Awards ==
- Florida Association of Community Health Centers, 'Legislator of the Year Award', 1998
- Coastal Conservation Association of Florida, 'Florida Conservation Award', 1998
- Florida League of Cities, 'Defender of Home Rule Award', 1996
- East Central Florida Regional Planning Council, 'Legislative Appreciation Award', 1993
- Brevard Home Builders and Contractors Association Outstanding Legislative Efforts Award 1993
- Florida Association of Realtors, 'Legislator of the Year Award', 1991
- Florida Association of Retarded Citizens 'Outstanding Representative', 1990
- Florida Conservation Association Legislative Session Award 1988
- Florida League of Cities, 'Quality Floridian Award', 1987

| Preceded by Vernon L. Dicks | Mayor of Melbourne, Florida; 1979–1986 | Succeeded by Joseph F. Mullins Jr. |
| Preceded by Marilyn Evans-Jones | Member of the Florida House of Representatives from the 33rd 1986–1992 | Succeeded by Marvin Couch |
| Preceded by Charlie Roberts | Member of the Florida House of Representatives from the 31st 1992–2000 | Succeeded by Mitch Needelman |
| Preceded by John A. Buckley | Mayor of Melbourne, Florida; 2004–2012 | Succeeded by Kathleen Meehan |
