= Don Hahnfeldt =

American politician

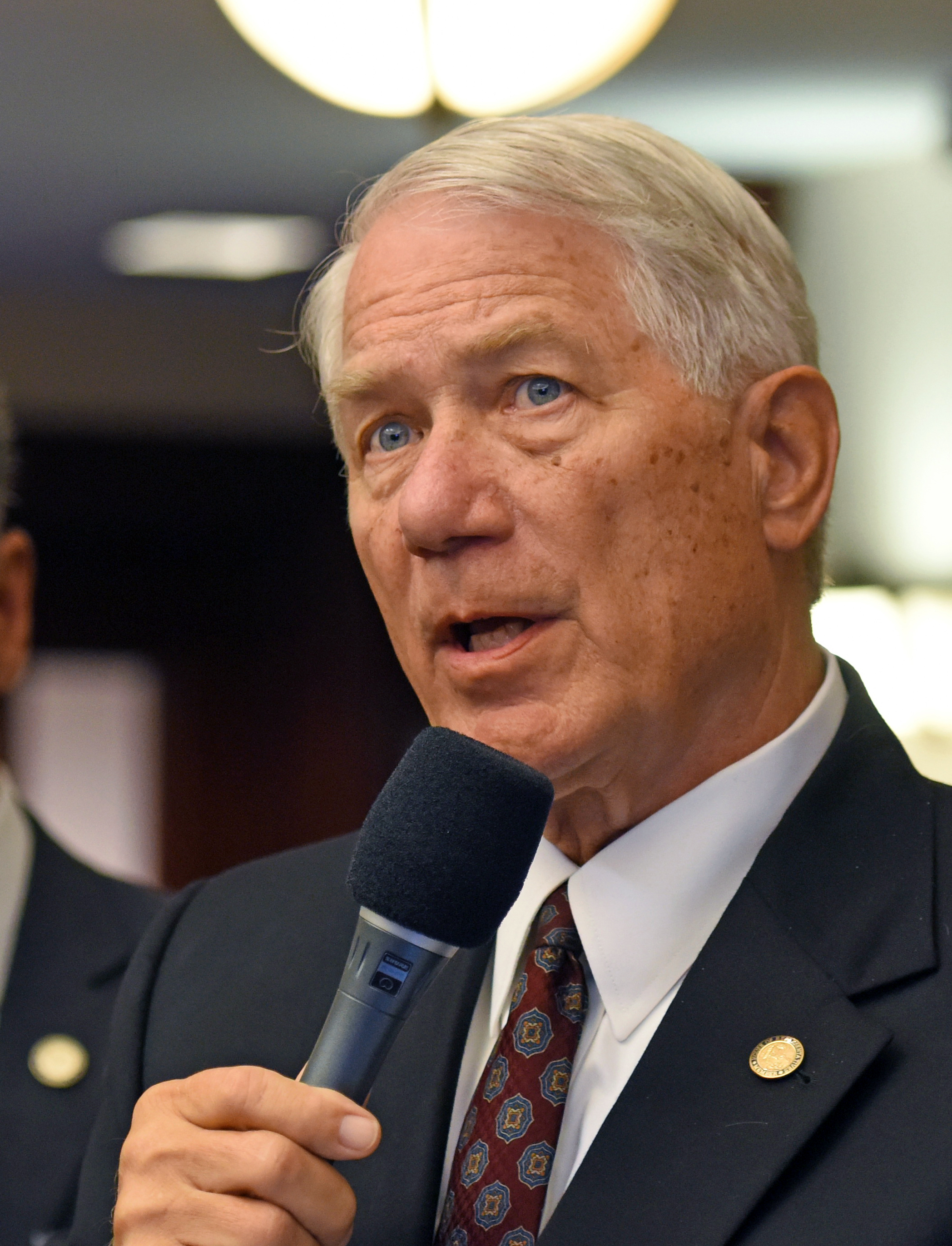
- Hahnfeldt in 2016

Member of the Florida House of Representatives from the 33rd district
- In office November 8, 2016 – December 24, 2017
- Preceded by: H. Marlene O'Toole
- Succeeded by: Brett Hage

Personal details
- Born: April 29, 1944 Pittsburgh, Pennsylvania, U.S.
- Died: December 24, 2017 (aged 73)
- Party: Republican
- Spouse: Cheryle Hahnfeldt
- Children: 3
- Education: Roosevelt University (BS); Naval Postgraduate School (MS); Valdosta State University (MPA)

Don Hahnfeldt (April 29, 1944 – December 24, 2017) was an American politician.

== Formative years ==
Hahnfeldt was born in Pittsburgh, Pennsylvania. He received his bachelor's degree from Roosevelt University and his master's degrees from Naval Postgraduate School and from Valdosta State University. Hahnfeldt then served in the United States Navy and became a submarine captain.

== Public service ==
Hahnfeldt lived in The Villages, Florida. After serving on the Sumter County Board of Commissioners from 2012 until 2016, he then served as the Republican member of the Florida House of Representatives for District 33, which includes Sumter County and parts of Lake County and Marion County, Florida.

== Death ==
Hahnfeldt died from cancer at the age of seventy-three.
