= Charlie Roberts (politician) =

American politician

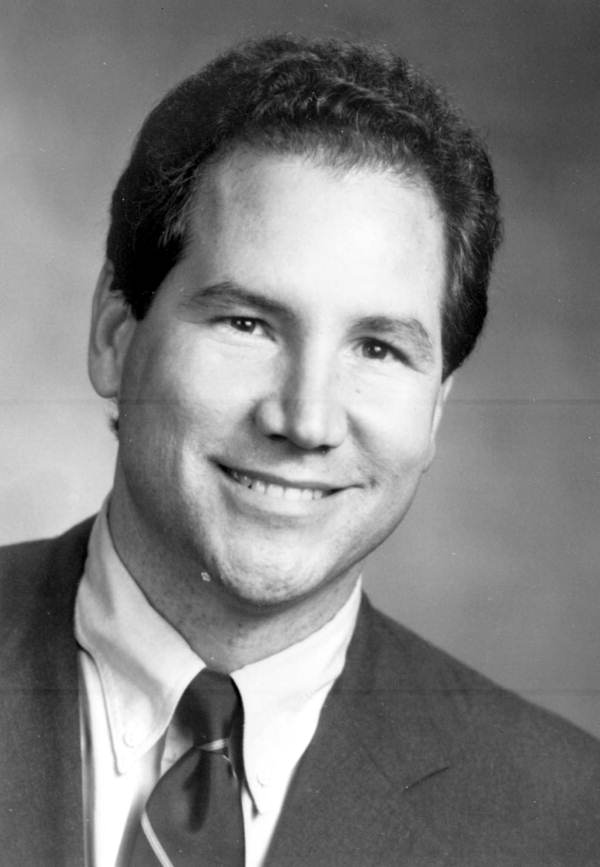
- Roberts in 1992

Member of the Florida House of Representatives from the 31st district
- In office 1988–1992
- Preceded by: Winston Gardner Jr.
- Succeeded by: Harry Goode

Member of the Florida House of Representatives from the 29th district
- In office 1992–1994
- Preceded by: T. K. Wetherell
- Succeeded by: Randy Ball

Personal details
- Born: November 5, 1953 (age 72) Jacksonville, Florida, U.S.
- Party: Democratic
- Education: University of Florida; Stetson University College of Law

Charlie Roberts (born November 5, 1953) is an American politician. He served as a Democratic member for the 29th and 31st district of the Florida House of Representatives.

== Life and career ==
Roberts was born in Jacksonville, Florida. He attended the University of Florida and Stetson University College of Law.

In 1988, Roberts was elected to represent the 31st district of the Florida House of Representatives, succeeding Winston Gardner Jr. He served until 1992, when he was succeeded by Harry Goode. In the same year, he was elected to represent the 29th district, succeeding T. K. Wetherell. He served until 1994, when he was succeeded by Randy John Ball.
