= Jerome Pratt =

American politician (1926–1984)

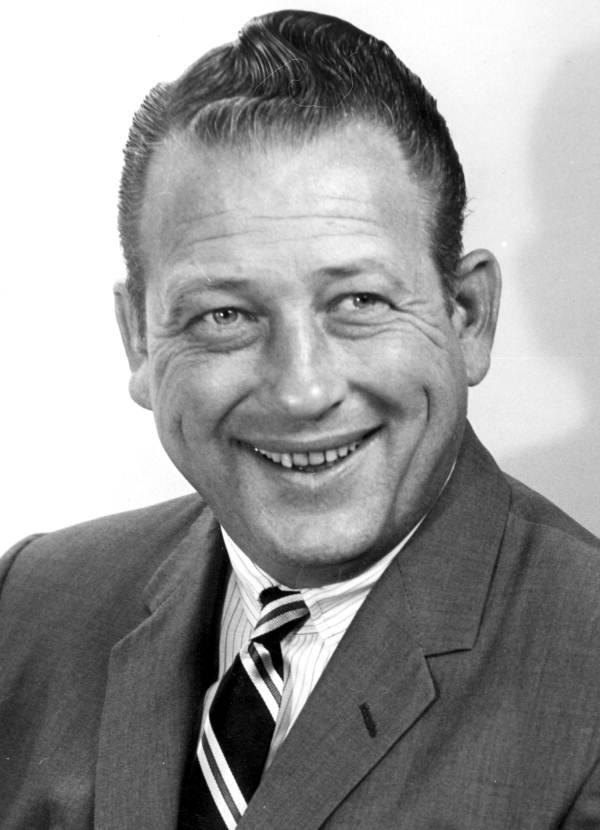
- Pratt in 1966

Member of the Florida House of Representatives from the 115th district
- In office March 1967 – 1970
- Preceded by: District established
- Succeeded by: John P. Harllee

Personal details
- Born: Charles Jerome Pratt; March 3, 1926 Orlando, Florida, U.S.
- Died: August 28, 1984 (aged 58) Bradenton, Florida, U.S.
- Party: Democratic
- Spouse: Virginia Pratt
- Children: 4
- Education: Stetson University College of Law

Charles Jerome Pratt (March 3, 1926 – August 28, 1984) was an American politician. He served as a Democratic member for the 115th district of the Florida House of Representatives from 1967 to 1970.

Pratt was born in Orlando, Florida. He attended Stetson University College of Law, where he earned a Bachelor of Laws degree in 1954. In 1967 he became the first member for the newly established 115th district of the Florida House of Representatives, serving until 1970.

Pratt was also a prosecutor and judge in Palmetto, Florida.

Pratt died in August 1984 at the L.W. Blake Memorial Hospital in Bradenton, Florida, at the age of 58. He was buried in Manasota Memorial Park.
