= Florida's 31st House of Representatives district =

American legislative district

Florida's 31st State House of Representatives district
Representative
Tyler Sirois; R–Merritt Island
- Registration: 60.3% Republican; 37.0% Democratic; 0.7% No party preference
- Demographics: 75.6% White; 9.5% Black; 9.1% Hispanic; 3.1% Asian; 2.4% Native American; 0.3% Hawaiian/Pacific Islander
- Population (2020): 173,252

Florida's 31st House of Representatives district elects one member of the Florida House of Representatives. Currently encompassing part of Brevard county, its current representative is Republican Tyler Sirois.

== Representatives from 1967 to the present ==
Representative	Party	Years of service	Hometown	Notes
William C. Andrews	Democratic	1967 - November 7, 1972		district created
J. Hyatt Brown	Democratic	November 7, 1972 – November 4, 1980		Served as Speaker (1978, 1979, 1980)
T. K. Wetherell	Democratic	November 4, 1980 – November 2, 1982	Daytona Beach	Redistricted to the 29th district
Winston Gardner Jr.	Democratic	November 2, 1982 – November 8, 1988	Titusville	
Charlie Roberts	Democratic	November 8, 1988 - November 3, 1992		Redistricted to the 29th district
Harry Goode	Democratic	November 3, 1992 – November 7, 2000	Melbourne	Switched from the Democratic Party to the Republican Party on April 27, 1998
Mitch Needelman	Republican	November 7, 2000 – November 4, 2008	Melbourne	
John Tobia	Republican	November 18, 2008 – November 20, 2012	Melbourne Beach	Redistricted to the 53rd district
Bryan Nelson	Republican	November 6, 2012 – November 4, 2014	Apopka	
Jennifer Sullivan	Republican	November 4, 2014 – November 3, 2020	Eustis	
Keith Truenow	Republican	November 4, 2020 – November 8, 2022	Tavares	Redistricted to the 26th district
Tyler Sirois	Republican	November 8, 2022 – Present	Merritt Island	

== See also ==
- List of members of the Florida House of Representatives from Brevard County, Florida
