= Larry Kirkwood =

American politician (born 1941)

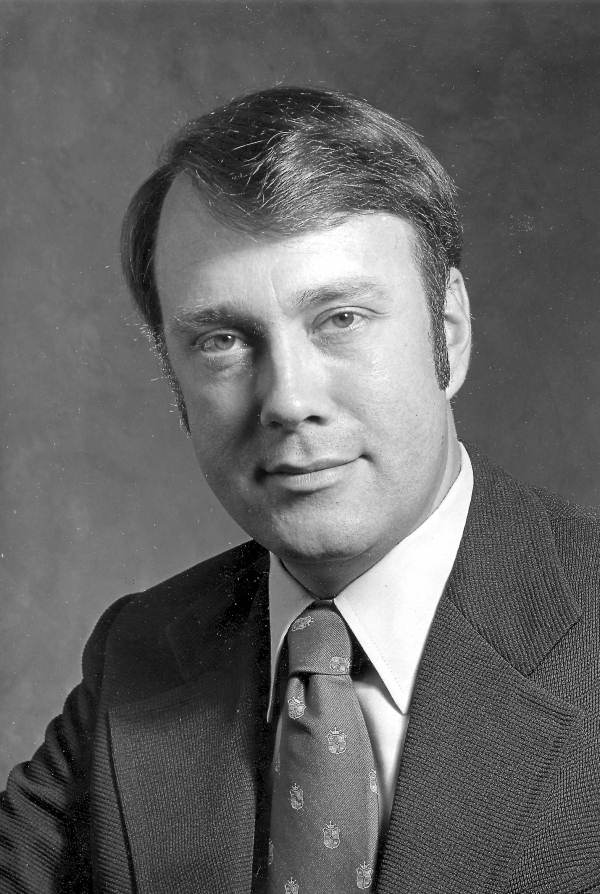

Member of the Florida House of Representatives for the 38th district
- In office 1977–1980
- Preceded by: William L. Gibson
- Succeeded by: Bruce McEwan

Personal details
- Born: Lawrence Robert Kirkwood; June 29, 1941 (age 85) Chicago, Illinois, United States
- Party: Republican
- Occupation: Judge

Lawrence Robert Kirkwood (born June 29, 1941) is an American judge and former politician in the state of Florida.

Kirkwood was born in Chicago. He attended Florida Southern College for a Bachelor of Arts degree, the University of Florida College of Law for a Juris Doctor, and the University of Nevada-Reno for a Master of Judicial Studies degree. He was a circuit judge in Orange County, Florida and is currently a senior judge on the Florida Ninth Circuit Court. He served in the Florida House of Representatives from 1977 to 1980, as a Republican, representing the 38th district.
