= Eugene Mooney =

American politician

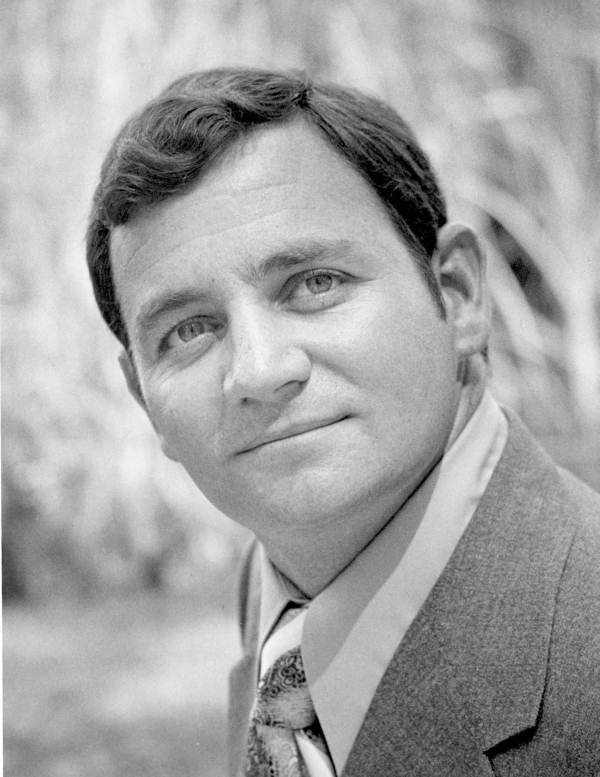

Member of the Florida House of Representatives from the 33rd district
- In office November 7, 1972 – November 5, 1974
- Preceded by: James Glisson
- Succeeded by: Bob Hattaway

Member of the Florida House of Representatives from the 38th district
- In office November 3, 1970 - November 7, 1972
- Preceded by: Leonard V. Wood
- Succeeded by: William Gibson

Personal details
- Born: January 16, 1943 (age 83) Winter Park, Florida
- Party: Republican

Eugene C. Mooney (born January 16, 1943) was an American politician in the state of Florida.

Mooney was born in Winter Park, and attended the University of Florida, earning a Bachelor of Science degree. He served in the Florida House of Representatives for the 38th district from 1970 to 1972 and the 33rd district from 1972 to 1974, as a Republican. He lives in Tennessee.
