= Mitch Needelman =

American politician (1952–2025)

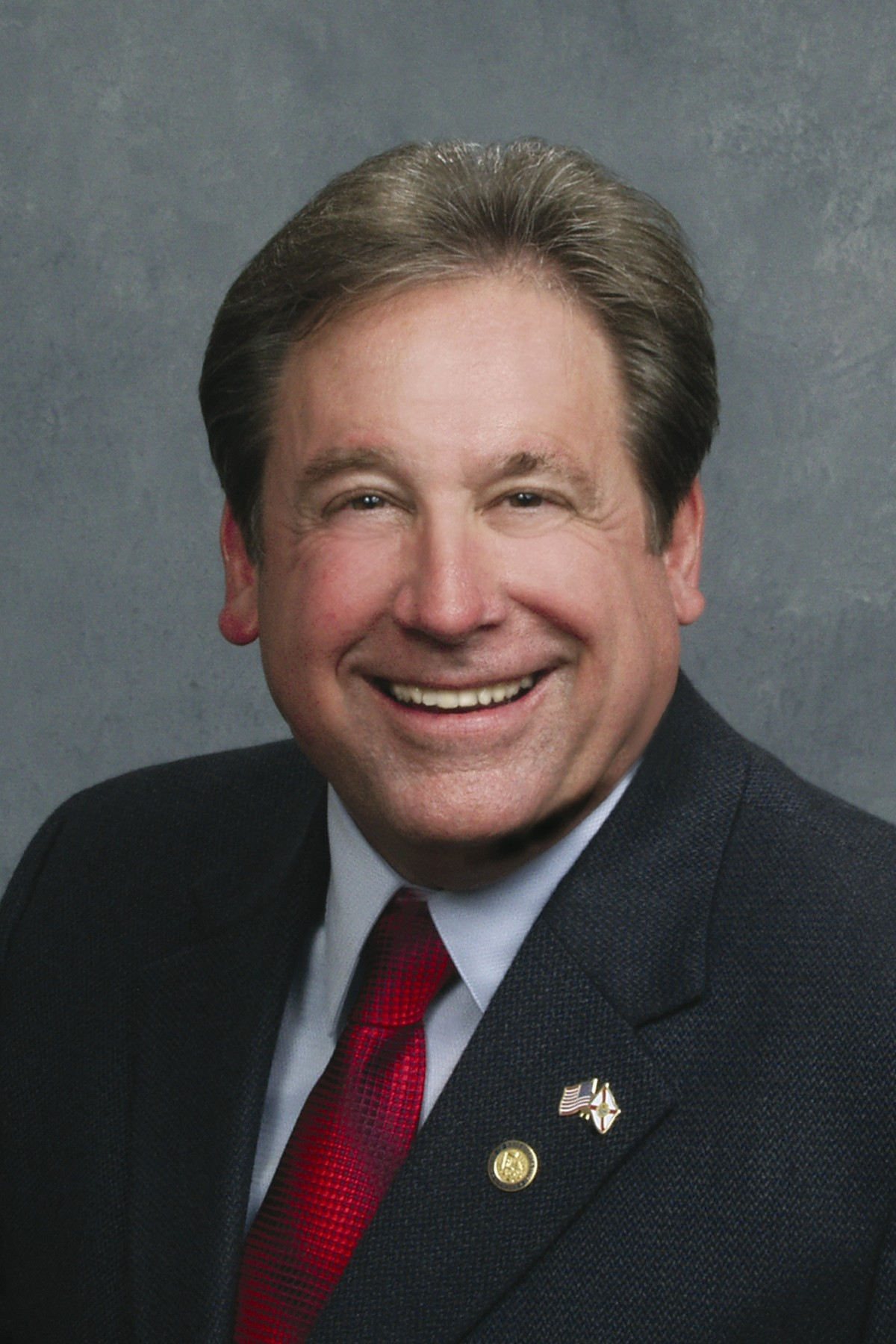

Member of the Florida House of Representatives from the 31st district
- In office November 7, 2000 – November 4, 2008
- Preceded by: Harry Goode
- Succeeded by: John Tobia

Personal details
- Born: October 23, 1952 Miami, Florida, U.S.
- Died: September 1, 2025 (aged 72)
- Party: Republican
- Spouse: Joan "Joannie" McDonald Needelman
- Children: Michael
- Education: Miami Dade Junior College (A.A., Criminology, 1972), Warner Southern College, (B.A., Organizational Management, 1994), Webster University (M.A. Public Administration/Human Resources Development, 1996)

Mitch Needelman (October 23, 1952 – September 1, 2025) was an American politician who was a member of the Florida House of Representatives serving as a Republican. He represented the 31st district from 2000 to 2008.

Needelman then served as Clerk of Brevard County Courts, but lost his bid for re-election in 2012.

In 2017 he was found guilty of:

• bribery, a second-degree felony punishable by up to 15 years in prison and a fine of up to $10,000

• conspiracy to commit bribery, a third-degree felony punishable by up to five years in prison and/or a $5,000 fine

• bid tampering, a second-degree felony

• entering a contract resulting from bid tampering, a second-degree felony

• official misconduct, a third-degree felony

• unlawful campaign contributions in excess of $500, a third-degree felony.

He was a member of the City of Melbourne Zoning Board of Adjustments from 1988 to 2000, and its chairman from 1996 to 1997.

== Background ==
Needelman was born in Miami, Florida, on October 23, 1952. He died on September 1, 2025, at the age of 72.

== Bid rigging scandal ==
In early 2012, BlueWare CEO Rose Harr met former state representative and current Brevard County Clerk Mitch Needelman, via Matt DuPree, a former lobbyist and business partner of Needelman. On April 6, 2012, Needelman signed a contract with RoseWare LLC, one of the 10 companies within BlueWare's "corporate family." On the day of signing, $100,000 was wired from Brevard County to BlueWare.

On April 18, 2012, the former Brevard County Clerk, Republican Scott Ellis, filed a public records request for any and all contracts between the County Clerk's office and BlueWare.

On May 3, 2012, Needelman issued an Invitation to Negotiate (ITN) for a contract to digitize old county records which were then being stored in a gymnasium. This ITN, which was reportedly written by BlueWare itself, allowed only eight days to submit bids, which did not allow other firms the time needed to prepare. Selection of a bid was made only five days later. BlueWare, which had never performed such services for government before, submitted a bid of $8.5 million under the company name BlueGem, Inc. Despite the short time-frame, the experienced document imaging company FNTI had submitted a bid of only $3.5 million. On May 23, in spite of the lower bid, BlueWare was wired an additional $500,000. The contract was signed on June 29, and BlueWare received its first monthly payment of $90,000.

While this was ongoing, Needelman and Ellis were competing for the Republican nomination for County Clerk. One of the major issues in the campaign was the contract Needelman had signed with BlueWare. It would later emerge that some of the money Needelman had arranged for BlueWare to receive was being diverted to his campaign. The primary was held on August 14, 2012, and Ellis defeated Needelman with 60.8% of the vote.

On August 30, 2012, a former BlueWare employee filed suit against BlueWare and CEO Harr for, among other things, illegal termination. The suit claims that the employee was terminated in retaliation for threatening to expose Harr's "improper conduct" with "a certain government official in the State of Florida." Sometime in the next month, DuPree was hired by BlueWare.

On October 27, 2012, County Clerk Needelman signed a loan with Hewlett Packard for $6.1 million, despite the fact that the County Clerk is not allowed under Florida law to borrow money. On November 8, 2012, Needelman wired $5,690,526 to BlueWare.

On January 8, 2013, Ellis was sworn in as Brevard Country Clerk and continued his investigation into Needelman and BlueWare. Needelman and DuPree were arrested on August 15, 2013. The next day, Harr turned herself in to the Seminole County Sheriff's Office.

Needelman in October 2017 was found guilty of bribery, bid tampering and official misconduct.

William Dupree was found guilty and sentenced to 21 months in prison.

== Associations ==
- Florida Police Benevolent Association, SLEO Chapter, past member, past executive board, past Secretary
- Cocoa/Rockledge Civic League, Graduate Scholarship Committee, past member
- Continuing Adult Education Board, St. Joseph Parish, past member
- City of Melbourne's Comprehensive Planning Committee, past member
- Brevard County's Manatee ad hoc Committee, past member
- City of Melbourne Riverside Park ad hoc Committee, past member
- Melbourne/Palm Bay Area Chamber of Commerce
- American Red Cross, Brevard Chapter, Board of Directors
- American Cancer Society, Brevard Chapter, Public Issues Committee
- Marine Resource Council
- North Eau Gallie Civic Association, past President

== Awards ==
- Florida Police Benevolent Association, Dedicated Service 2000
- City of Melbourne, Outstanding Public Service 2000
- Crosswinds Youth Services, Volunteer of the Year 1999
- Sierra Club FL Chapter, Osprey Award 1998
- City of Melbourne, Law Enforcement Officer of the Year 1997
- United States Power Squadron, Certificate of Appreciation 1997
- Palm Bay Fire Department, Certificate of Appreciation 1996
- Florida Marine Patrol Commendation 1994
- Brevard County, Resolution of Appreciation 1990
- City of Melbourne, Outstanding Service 1990
- City of Palm Bay, Outstanding Service 1990
- Lively Criminal Justice, Best Overall Instructor 1990
- Brevard County School Board Appreciation 1989
- Save the Manatee Club, Law Enforcement Officer of the Year 1989
- City of Palm Bay Police Department Appreciation 1988
- Eastern Space and Missile Center NASA, Appreciation 1987
- Governor's Office 1983
- U.S. Coast Guard 1978
- Key West Race Committee 1974
- Department of Defense-Navy, Appreciation 1973
- Department of Treasury, Secret Service, Appreciation 1972
- Florida Marine Patrol, 28 1/2 years
- State Law Enforcement Officer, Outreach Coordinator, media and public relations, education and funding resources

Preceded by Harry Goode	Member of the Florida House of Representatives from the 31st 2000–2008	Succeeded by John Tobia
