= Monique Miller (politician) =

American politician (born 1970)

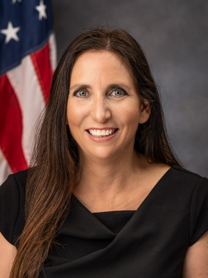
- Official portrait, 2024

Member of the Florida House of Representatives from the 33rd district
- Incumbent
- Assumed office November 5, 2024
- Preceded by: Randy Fine

Personal details
- Born: August 21, 1970 (age 55) Kansas City, Missouri, U.S.
- Party: Republican
- Spouse: Gregg Lynk
- Education: Loyola University New Orleans (BA); Emory University (MBA)

Monique Miller (born August 21, 1970) is an American politician and cybersecurity executive serving since 2024 as a Republican member of the Florida House of Representatives from the 33rd district. She is a former advisory board member of Moms for Liberty.

== Early life and education ==
Miller was born on August 21, 1970, in Kansas City, Missouri. She graduated with her bachelor's degree from Loyola University New Orleans and earned her master’s degree from Emory University.

== Career ==
Miller was elected to the Florida House of Representatives as a Republican in 2024, succeeding Randy Fine. She is a member of the House Ways & Means Committee.

== Personal life ==
Miller is Christian. She is married to her husband, Gregg Lynk. They live in Brevard County, Florida.
