= Florida's 53rd House of Representatives district =

American legislative district

Florida's 53rd State House of Representatives district
Representative
Jeff Holcomb; R–Spring Hill
- Registration: 62.1% Republican; 35.5% Democratic; 2.3% No party preference
- Demographics: 75.4% White; 5.6% Black; 14.9% Hispanic; 2.1% Asian; 2.4% Native American; 0.2% Hawaiian/Pacific Islander
- Population (2020) • Voting age: 175,358; 18

Florida's 53rd House district elects one member of the Florida House of Representatives. Its current representative is Jeff Holcomb. The district currently covers parts of Hernando and Pasco counties.

== Representatives from 1967 to the present ==
Representative	Party	Years of service	Residence	Notes
William Fleece	Republican	1967–1972		
Mary Grizzle	Republican	1972–1978	Clearwater	
Peter Dunbar	Republican	1978–1982	Crystal Beach	Redistricted to the 50th district
Dennis Jones	Republican	1982–1992	Treasure Island	Redistricted to the 54th district
Lars Hafner	Democratic	1992–2000	St. Petersburg	
Charlie Justice	Democratic	2000–2006	St. Petersburg	
Rick Kriseman	Democratic	2006–2012	St. Petersburg	Redistricted to the 68th district
John Tobia	Republican	2012–2016	Melbourne Beach	
Randy Fine	Republican	2016–2022	Melbourne Beach	
Jeff Holcomb	Republican	2022–present	Spring Hill	

== See also ==
- List of members of the Florida House of Representatives from Brevard County, Florida
