= Henry Sayler (Florida politician) =

American politician (1921–2021)

Henry B. Sayler
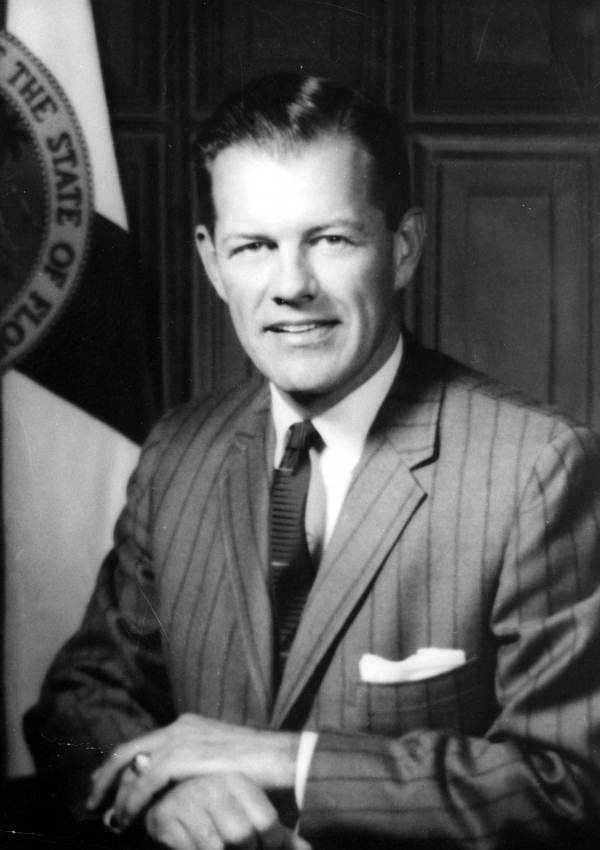

Member of the Florida Senate
- In office 1967–1971; 1973–1978

Chair of the Florida Republican Party
- In office 1980–1984
- Preceded by: Bill Taylor
- Succeeded by: Jeanie Austin

Personal details
- Born: January 16, 1921 Savannah, Georgia, U.S.
- Died: May 26, 2021 (aged 100) Florida, U.S.
- Party: Republican
- Spouse: Wyline Chapman (m. 1947; died 2020)
- Children: 4
- Education: United States Military Academy
- Occupation: President of Security Planning of Florida Inc.

Henry Benton Sayler (January 16, 1921 – May 26, 2021) was an American politician in the state of Florida who served as a Member of the Florida Senate from 1967 to 1971 and again from 1973 to 1978.

Sayler was born in Savannah, Georgia on January 16, 1921, and moved to Florida in 1941. He attended the United States Military Academy where he attained a Bachelor of Science degree in 1943. He also served in World War II in the US Army Air Forces. Sayler served in the Florida State Senate from 1967 to 1971 and 1973 to 1978, as a member of the Republican Party (20th district and 21st district). Sayler served as Chairman of the Florida Republican Party from 1980 to 1984. Sayler married Wyline Chapman in 1947. She predeceased him in July 2020, aged 95. Sayler turned 100 in January 2021 and died in May 2021.

Sayler was vaccinated against COVID-19 on live TV days after his 100th birthday to promote the rollout of the vaccine in Florida.
