= James Glisson =

American politician (1939–2021)

Jim Glisson
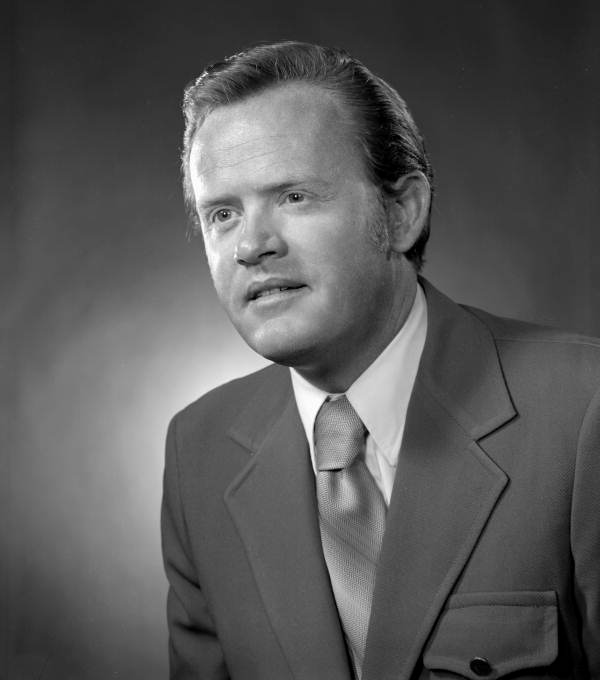

Member of the Florida Senate from the 11th district
- In office November 7, 1972 – November 7, 1978
- Preceded by: Bill Beaufort
- Succeeded by: Vince Fechtel Jr.

Member of the Florida House of Representatives from the 33rd district
- In office November 5, 1968 – November 7, 1972
- Preceded by: James N. Beck
- Succeeded by: Eugene Mooney

Personal details
- Born: January 6, 1939 Jackson County, Florida
- Died: September 30, 2021 (aged 82)
- Party: Democratic (1976–2021; his death)
- Other political affiliations: Republican (until 1976)
- Occupation: Chiropractor

James A. Glisson (January 6, 1939 – September 30, 2021) was a chiropractor and state legislator in Florida.

Glisson was born in Jackson County, Florida. He attended Palmer College and earned a degree in chiropractic studies He served in the Florida House of Representatives for the 33rd district from 1968 to 1972, as a Republican. He was elected to the State Senate in 1973 and served the 11th district until 1978. In 1976, he changed his party affiliation from Republican to Democratic.
