= Leonard V. Wood =

American politician (1937–2013)

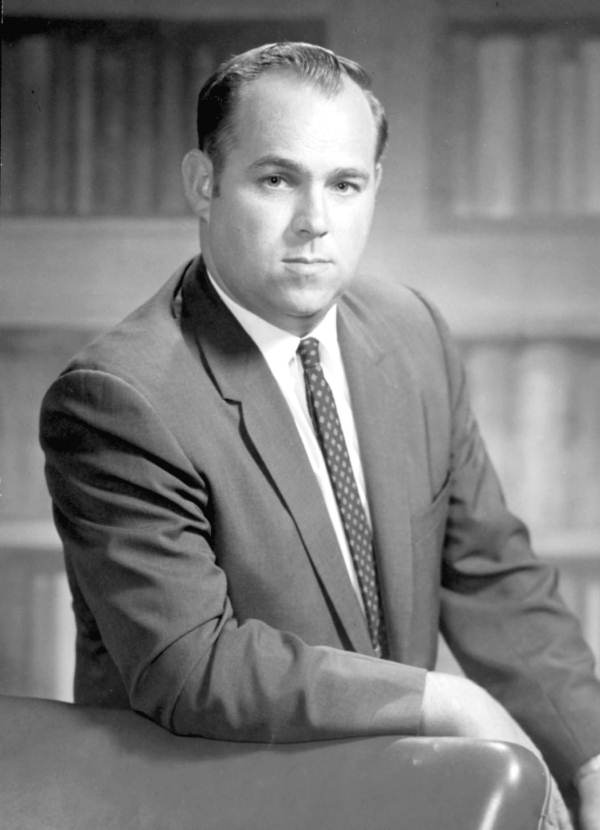
- Wood in 1968

Member of the Florida House of Representatives from the 38th district
- In office 1968–1970
- Preceded by: Henry W. Land
- Succeeded by: Eugene Mooney

Personal details
- Born: March 3, 1937 Chicago, Illinois, U.S.
- Died: March 24, 2013 (aged 76) Orlando, Florida, U.S.
- Party: Republican
- Spouse: Barbara Parker
- Children: 3
- Education: Rollins College; Duke University School of Law

Leonard V. Wood (March 3, 1937 – March 24, 2013) was an American politician. A Republican, he served as a member of the Florida House of Representatives representing the 38th district.

== Life and career ==
Wood was born in Chicago, Illinois. He attended Rollins College and Duke University School of Law.

In 1968, Wood was elected to represent the 38th district of the Florida House of Representatives, succeeding Henry W. Land. He served until 1970, when he was succeeded by Eugene Mooney.

Wood died in March 2013 in Orlando, Florida, at the age of 76.
