= Michael Glisson =

Brigadier general of the Army National Guard of Illinois

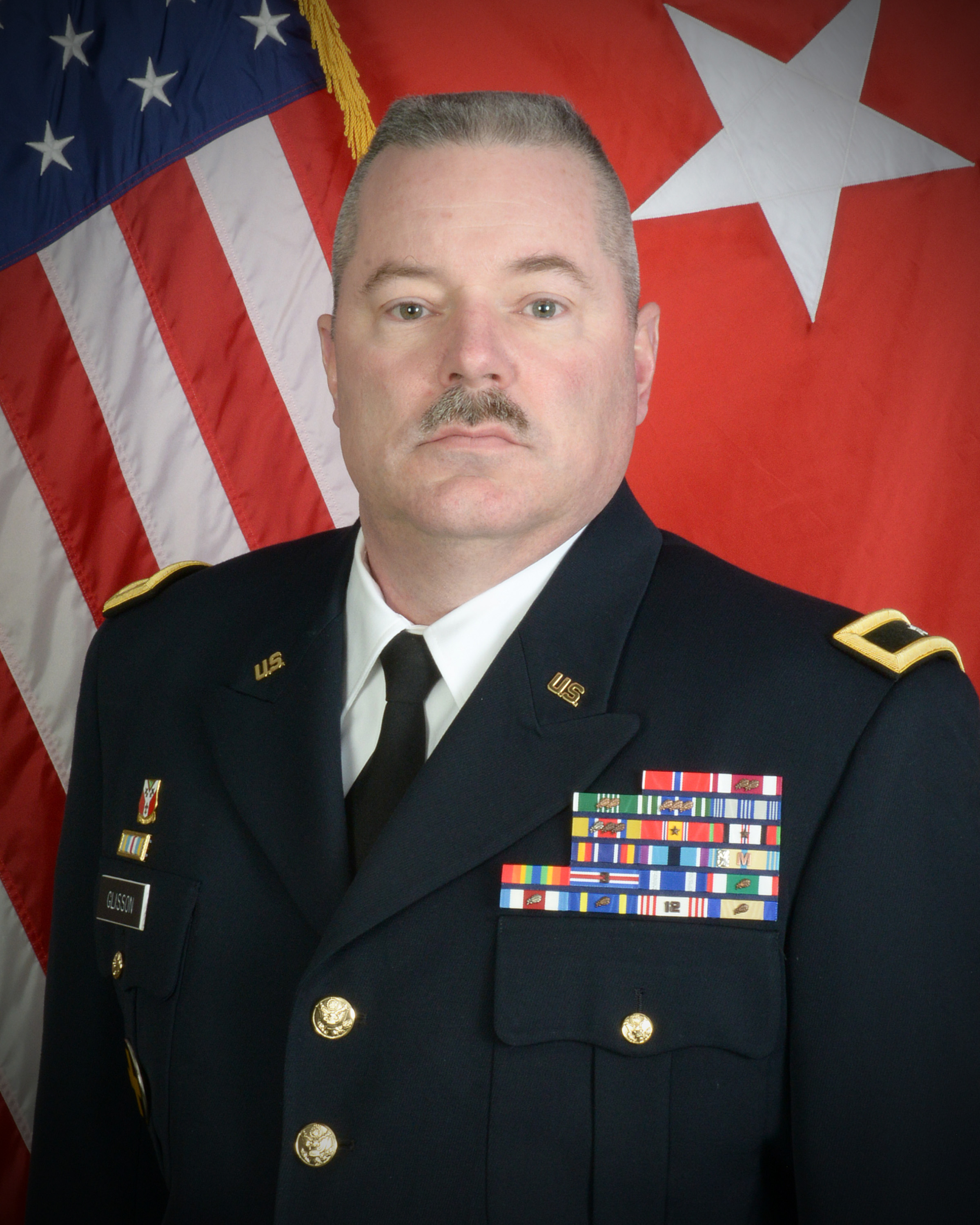
- Glisson in 2016
- Military career
- Allegiance: United States
- Branch: Army National Guard
- Service years: 1988–2020
- Rank: Brigadier General
- Commands: Director of Joint Staff for the Illinois Army National Guard; 33rd Infantry Brigade Combat Team; 65th Troop Command Brigade; Joint Staff Illinois National Guard
- Awards: Bronze Star Medal

Michael Glisson is an Army National Guard brigadier general who currently serves as the Chairman of the Joint Staff of the Illinois National Guard. He was appointed by Governor of Illinois Bruce Rauner in 2016.

As Director of Joint Staff, he is responsible for developing and coordinating all policies, programs and plans in Joint Matters that affect Illinois' 13,000 Army and Air National Guard personnel.

== Military career ==
Michael Glisson joined the Reserve Officer Training Corps at Southern Illinois University Carbondale and received his commission in 1988. Glisson deployed with the entire 33rd Infantry Brigade Combat Team to Afghanistan from 2008 to 2009, and was then put in command of the 65th Troop Command Brigade immediately prior to his current post.

Glisson was nominated for the Chairman of the Joint Staff in October 2015, and officially appointed on 7 January 2016.

== Civilian career ==
Glisson has a degree in metalsmithing from Southern Illinois University Carbondale, and currently operates a blacksmith shop out of Missouri.
