= Dennis J. Patrick O'Grady =

American politician

Dennis J. Patrick O'Grady (December 9, 1943 – March 29, 1972) was an American politician in the state of Florida. A Republican, he was the youngest person elected to the Florida State Senate. He won his seat at age 23 in a court-ordered election on March 28, 1967, to represent the 15th District and served until 1968. He was born in Brooklyn, New York, and had worked as a building contractor and nurseryman.

On March 29, 1972, O'Grady died in a car crash at the age of 28.
