= L. K. Edwards Jr. =

American politician

L. K. Edwards
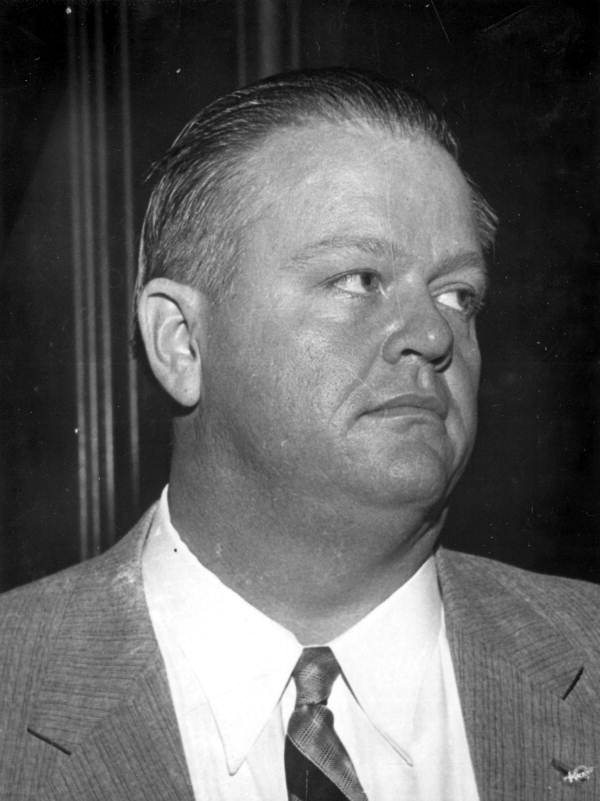

Member of the Florida Senate
- In office 1955–1965 (20th district)
- In office 1967–1969 (13th district)

Personal details
- Born: June 22, 1917 Irvine, Florida, U.S.
- Died: August 11, 1989 (aged 72) Ocala, Florida, U.S.
- Party: Democratic
- Spouse: Marjorie Elizabeth Griggs
- Occupation: farmer, rancher, manufacturer, banker

Lawrence Kirkland Edwards Jr. (June 22, 1917 – August 11, 1989) was an American politician in the state of Florida and a Democrat.

Edwards was born in Irvine, Florida, and lived there his whole life. He was a farmer, rancher, and banker. He served in the Florida State Senate from 1955 to 1965 as a Democratic member for the 20th district. He also served from 1967 to 1969 for the 13th district. He was a member of the Pork Chop Gang, a group of legislators from rural areas that dominated the state legislature due to malapportionment and used their power to engage in McCarthyist tactics.
