= Randy Fine =

American politician (born 1974)

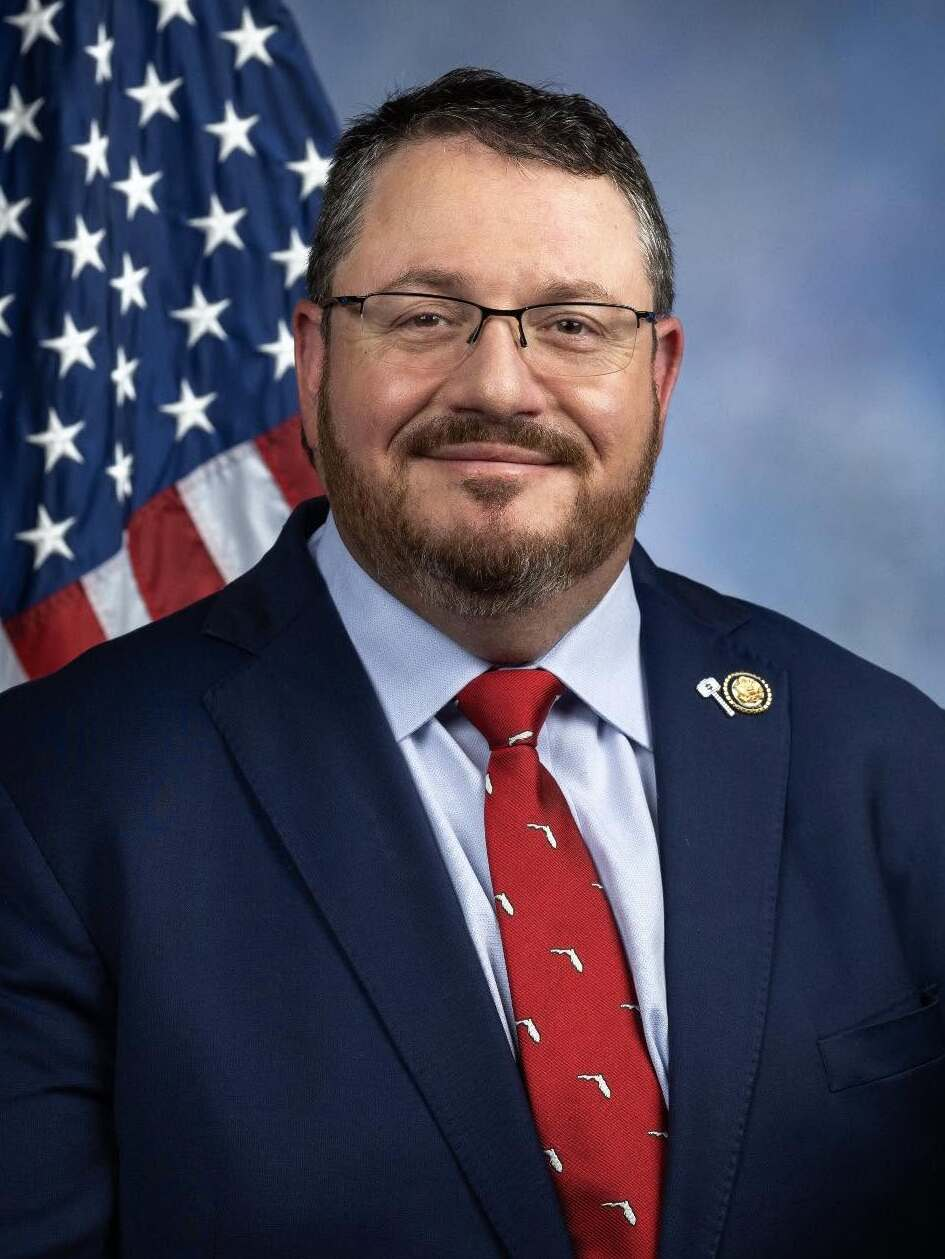
- Official portrait, 2026

Member of the U.S. House of Representatives from Florida's 6th district
- Incumbent
- Assumed office April 1, 2025 (Note: Fine's official service begins on the date of the special election, while he was not sworn in until April 2, 2025.)
- Preceded by: Mike Waltz

Member of the Florida Senate from the 19th district
- In office November 5, 2024 – March 31, 2025
- Preceded by: Debbie Mayfield
- Succeeded by: Debbie Mayfield

Member of the Florida House of Representatives
- In office November 8, 2016 – November 5, 2024
- Preceded by: John Tobia
- Succeeded by: Monique Miller
- Constituency: 53rd district (2016–2022); 33rd district (2022–2024)

Personal details
- Born: Randall Adam Fine; April 20, 1974 (age 52) Tucson, Arizona, U.S.
- Party: Republican
- Spouse(s): Anne Price (m. 1996, divorced) Wendy
- Children: 2
- Education: Harvard University (BA, MBA)
- Website: House website Campaign website
- Fine's voice Fine on a war powers resolution regarding the 2026 Iran war Recorded May 20, 2026

Randall Adam Fine (born April 20, 1974) is an American politician and former gambling industry executive serving as the U.S. representative for Florida's 6th congressional district since April 2025. A member of the Republican Party, he previously served in the Florida Senate from 2024 to 2025 and in the Florida House of Representatives from 2016 to 2024. His congressional district covers a six-county area that includes Daytona Beach.

Born in Arizona and raised in Kentucky, Fine graduated from Harvard University with a bachelor's degree in government and earned a Master of Business Administration (M.B.A.) degree from Harvard Business School in 1996. After working for McKinsey & Company and later as a teaching fellow at Harvard, Fine became a corporate executive working in the casino gambling industry. In 2016, Fine was elected to the Florida House of Representatives, serving until his election to the Florida Senate in 2024. After Mike Waltz's resignation from Congress in 2025 to become U.S. national security advisor, Fine changed his residence and won the special election for the seat with the endorsement of President Donald Trump. He is a member of the House Freedom Caucus and the Republican Study Committee.

Fine has a long history of anti-Palestinian and anti-Muslim remarks. He has publicly identified himself as a supporter of Islamophobia, calling for the mass expulsion of Muslims from the United States, and has stated that "mainstream Muslims" should be "destroyed" for their alleged refusal to make peace with Israel. His comments have led to strong backlash, including calls to resign, from Democratic politicians and some conservatives.

== Early life ==
Randall Adam Fine was born on April 20, 1974, to a Jewish family in Tucson, Arizona. Fine's father, H. Alan Fine, a graduate of MIT, was a professor of engineering at the University of Kentucky. His mother, Harriet, who had been a junior high school science teacher, died in 2024 after suffering from Alzheimer's disease.

Fine was raised in Lexington, Kentucky, and graduated from Henry Clay High School in 1992, where he was co-valedictorian. He spent his 11th grade year of high school in 1990–91 as a page of the United States House of Representatives. Upon being chosen, he was quoted to have said, "I can't think of anywhere else I'd rather be next year than Washington on the floor of the House of Representatives." During the summers of 1991 and 1992, he was an intern for U.S. representative Robert Dornan (R-CA).

Fine attended Harvard University for his undergraduate studies. In 1995, he was chair of the Harvard University Undergraduate Council student affairs committee. While an undergraduate, he was active in student politics, and was accused of election financial improprieties by what he said was an anonymous source in a smear campaign. Fine received his undergraduate degree in 1996, graduating magna cum laude with a Bachelor of Arts in government. He went on to earn a Master of Business Administration from Harvard Business School (HBS), earning high honors with this achievement in 1998. At HBS, he was named a Baker Scholar, Harvard's highest award for academic achievement.

== Early career ==
Fine worked at the consulting firm McKinsey & Company in 1997, was a teaching fellow in economics at Harvard University in 1997–98 before becoming an executive for Harrah's Entertainment, the world's largest gaming company, and for American Casino & Entertainment Properties in 2002.

In 2005, at 31 years of age, he founded, and for nearly ten years thereafter operated, a Nevada-based casino industry, cruise line, tech, and health care consulting and management business, called the Fine Point Group, with locations in Florida, Memphis, and Las Vegas. It advised casino operators in Las Vegas, San Diego, Mississippi, New Mexico, Oregon, Pennsylvania, and Washington. In 2009, he was the chief executive officer of the Greektown Casino in Detroit, Michigan. In 2015, Fine explored a U.S. Senate bid, but opted instead to run for the Florida state legislature.

== Florida legislature ==
=== Florida House of Representatives (2016–24) ===
==== Elections ====
Fine won four consecutive elections in the Florida House of Representatives, in the 53rd and 33rd districts. In 2016, Fine, with 57% of the vote, defeated Democrat David Kearns for the 53rd district seat being vacated by John Tobia due to term limits. In 2018 and 2020, Fine was the incumbent, defeating Democrat Phil Moore with 55% of the vote in both elections. Following redistricting, Fine ran in the 33rd district in 2022, defeating Democrat Anthony Yantz with 57% of the vote.

==== Tenure ====
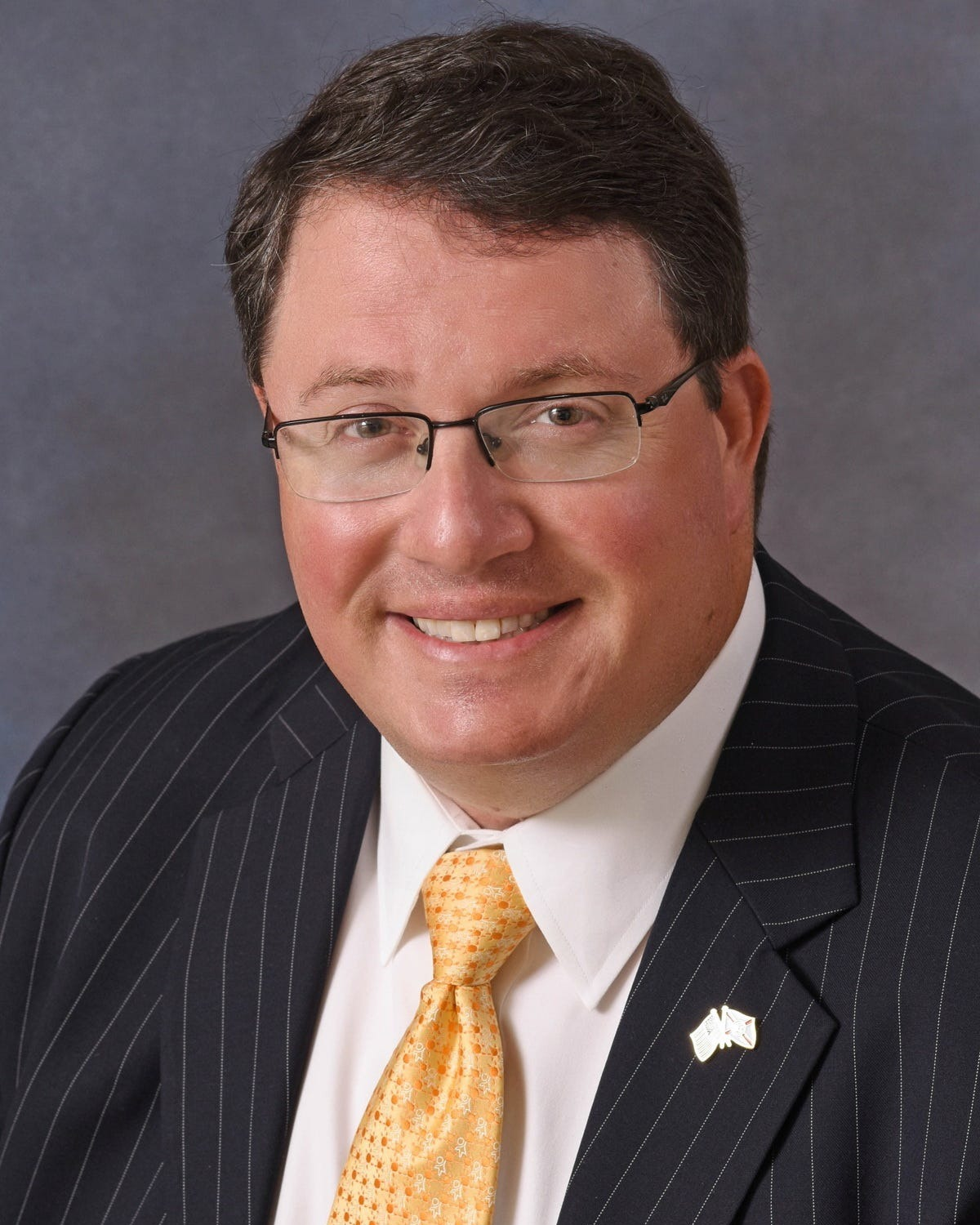
Fine in 2015

In the state house, Fine advocated protecting the Indian River Lagoon from sewage spills and opposing what he saw as wasteful, lower-priority spending. Fine introduced a bill in the House to provide up to $50 million per year in matching funds to upgrade sewage treatment facilities in the area of the marsh. The legislation also increased the fines for illegal sewage discharges. At the same time as his push against sewage spills, in 2019, he voted for HB 829, which made it illegal for local communities to ban the spreading of biosolids (solid organic matter recovered from a sewage treatment process and used as fertilizer) on farmlands that drain into the St. John's River and the Indian River Lagoon. River advocates said the practice of spreading dried human feces as fertilizer on farms around the St. John's River had been linked to toxic algae blooms affecting Melbourne's drinking water supply. Melbourne utility officials insisted that they remove algae toxins during their wastewater treatment process and that the drinking water is safe.

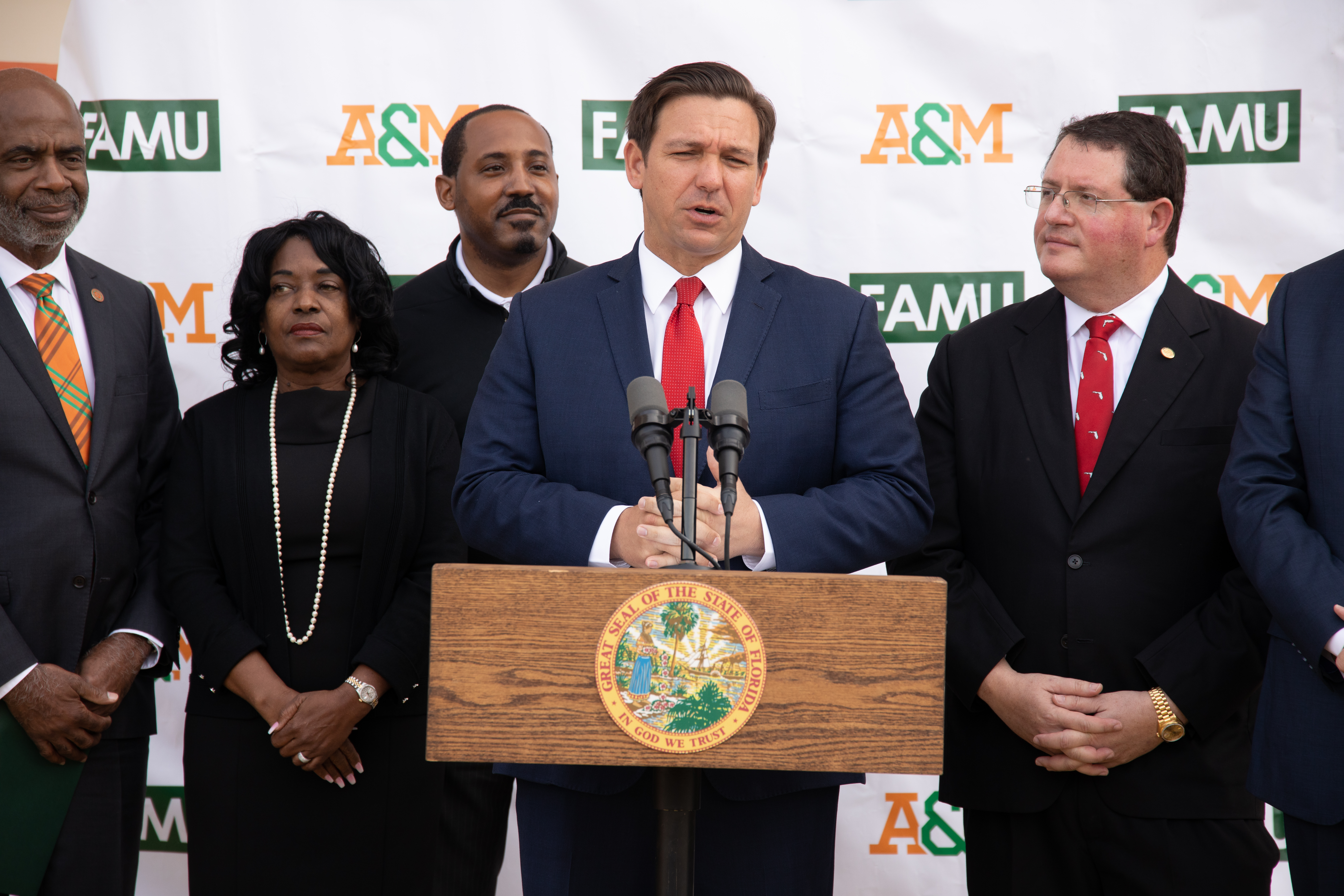
Fine (right) and Governor Ron DeSantis at Florida A&M University, 2020

The editorial board of the local newspaper Florida Today has criticized Fine's personal style. Their May 24, 2018, joint editorial observed that "Fine is obviously a hard working [sic?] lawmaker who has used his watchdog skills to do good" but said that "Fine should defend what he believes in, but not by launching tirades against others as crusades on behalf of his constituents. He can look good without trying to make others look bad with personal attacks." There are multiple cases of Fine using "threats to pull or withhold state funding... to strike back at political rivals and retaliate over perceived slights." These include the Brevard Zoo (2023), a Palm Bay Magnet High School firefighter academy (2022), and the West Melbourne Special Olympics (2021; Fine denied he threatened to get the funding pulled). In April 2023, the Florida Commission on Ethics found probable cause he violated ethics rules by threatening to withhold state funding over a personal dispute and interfering in a council member's request for public records. In October 2024, county judge Scott Blaue held Fine in contempt of court for making an obscene gesture and making the 'loser' hand sign during a virtual hearing over an election paperwork dispute. Fine was ordered to take an 8-hour anger management course.

===== Reedy Creek Improvement District =====
In 2022, Fine sponsored a bill to dissolve all six independent special districts in Florida established prior to November 5, 1968 (the date of the ratification of the Constitution of Florida), including the Reedy Creek Improvement District (RCID), which at the time was the governing jurisdiction and special taxing district for the land of Walt Disney World Resort. The bill passed both the Florida House of Representatives and the Florida State Senate, and was signed into law by Governor Ron DeSantis on April 22, 2022. A number of commentators said that the potential dissolution was in retaliation for the Walt Disney Company announcing its opposition to the Florida Parental Rights in Education Act (dubbed the "Don't Say Gay Bill" by its critics), which had passed several weeks prior and prohibits classroom instruction on sexual orientation and gender identity with children in twelfth grade or younger. In an interview, Fine said that research into the RCID and other special districts started "When Disney kicked the hornet's nest several weeks ago." When the potential impact on taxes in the surrounding counties of Orange and Osceola was being discussed, Fine said that the taxpayers would save money and that the tax revenue would instead go to local governments.

==== Committee assignments (2022–24) ====
- Health & Human Services Committee (Chair)
- Appropriations Committee
- Education & Employment Committee
- Education Quality Subcommittee

=== Florida Senate (2024–25) ===
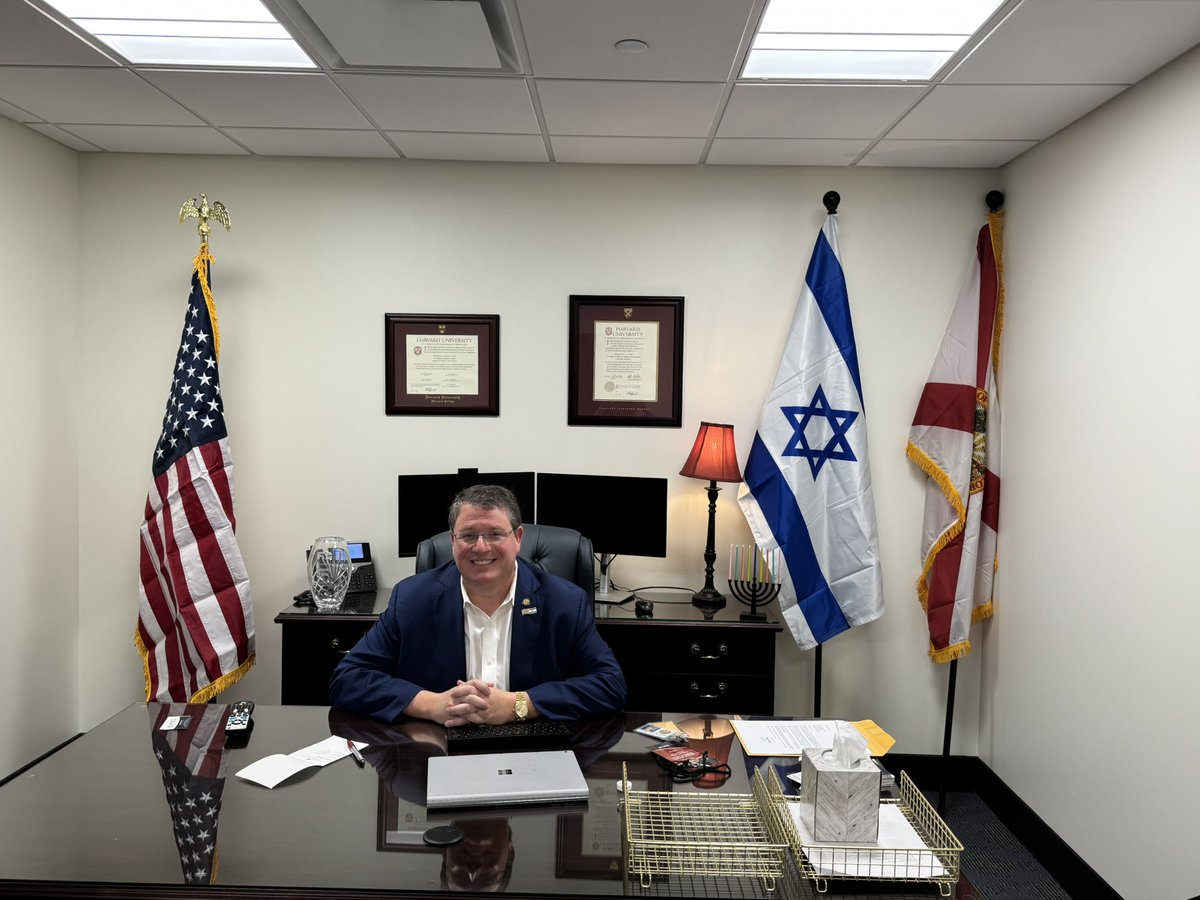
Fine in his office while discussing legislation on flags in government buildings, 2024

On November 5, 2024, Fine was elected to the Florida Senate from the 19th district, which includes Cape Canaveral and the majority of Brevard County, as he defeated Democrat Vance Ahrens 59% to 41%. He was officially sworn into office on November 19, 2024. He earned a salary of $29,697 as a state senator.

Due to Florida's resign-to-run law, after announcing his candidacy for the United States Congress, Fine submitted his resignation from the Florida Senate effective March 31, 2025.

==== Committee assignments ====
- Governmental Oversight and Accountability (Chair)
- Appropriations
- Appropriations Committee on Agriculture, Environment, and General Government
- Appropriations Committee on Pre-K –12 Education
- Education Postsecondary
- Regulated Industries
- Joint Select Committee on Collective Bargaining (Alternating Chair)

== U.S. House of Representatives ==
=== Elections ===
==== 2025 special ====
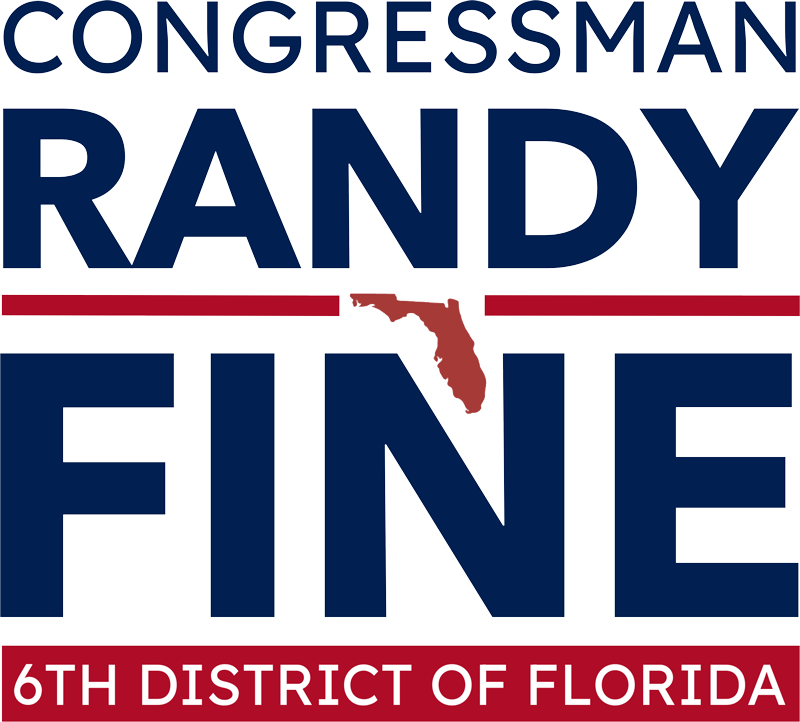

Upon the re-election of Donald Trump as President of the United States, Congressman Mike Waltz was announced as the next U.S. national security advisor. Waltz accordingly resigned from the U.S. House of Representatives effective January 20, 2025, triggering a special election in Florida's 6th congressional district, a six-county area that includes Daytona Beach.

On November 26, 2024, Fine declared his candidacy for Waltz's former seat representing Florida's 6th congressional district in the United States Congress. He was endorsed by President-elect Donald Trump (who wrote: "Randy Fine has my Complete and Total Endorsement. RUN, RANDY, RUN!"), Senator Rick Scott (R-FL), Speaker of the House Mike Johnson (R-LA), House majority leader Steve Scalise (R-LA), and House majority whip Tom Emmer (R-MN). His campaign page listed as his priorities "Secure our borders," "Protect our elections from fraud," "Defend life," and "Protect the Second Amendment at all costs."

Known for his "bare-knuckle style of politics", Fine calls himself "Hebrew Hammer". On the day of his announcement, he tweeted that "the Hebrew Hammer was coming" and that progressive representatives Rashida Tlaib and Ilhan Omar "might consider leaving before I get there. #BombsAway". He had previously used this hashtag to call for violence in the Israeli invasion of the Gaza Strip and Lebanon. Haaretz deemed the announcement a threat, and it was condemned by the Anti-Defamation League, but Fine denied that he had any intent to threaten.

Fine won the Republican primary with 83% of the vote. He defeated Aaron Baker and Ehsan Joarder.

Fine repeatedly labeled his progressive Democratic opponent, Josh Weil, as "Jihad Josh." He called for Weil's arrest after a convicted felon paid staffer on Weil's campaign was arrested on burglary and theft charges as she was handing out fliers for Weil's campaign. He also raised a 2015 case in which Weil, who is a teacher, was suspended for misconduct after a student accused Weil of slamming him to the ground.

In the April 1 general election, Fine defeated Weil by 27,400 votes, 57% to 43%, despite having been outraised by Weil by $10 million to under $1 million.

=== Tenure ===
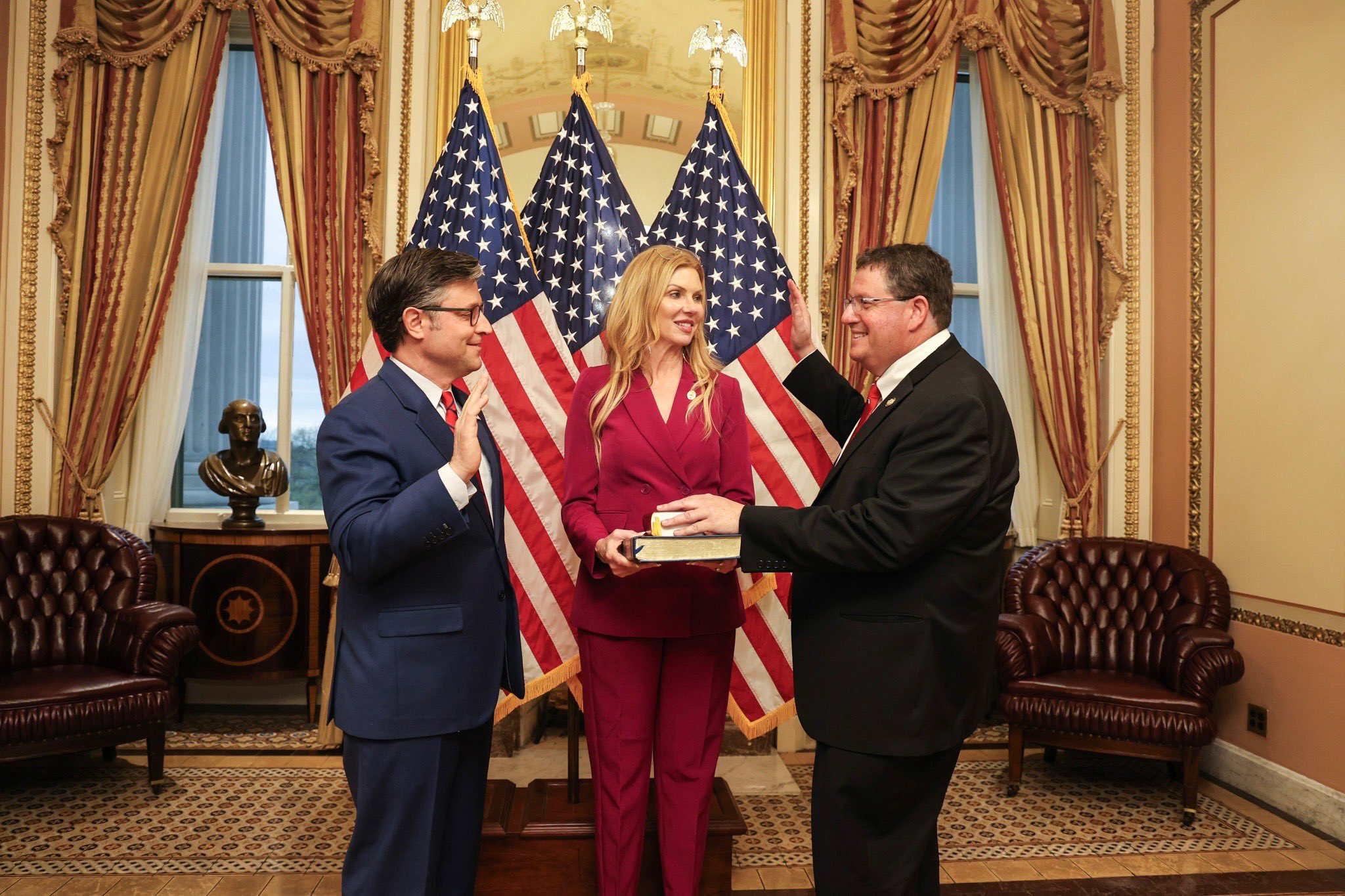
Fine (right) being sworn in as a U.S. representative by House speaker Mike Johnson (left), April 2025

On April 2, 2025, Fine was sworn into the U.S. House of Representatives by Speaker Mike Johnson using an ArtScroll Stone Edition Chumash.

A week after being sworn into office, Fine said that some progressive members of Congress "shouldn't be Americans" and called Rashida Tlaib a "terrorist".

In June 2025, Fine introduced a bill to designate the Council on American-Islamic Relations (CAIR) as a terrorist organization. CAIR had previously labelled Fine as an "anti-Muslim extremist" and characterized several of his statements as "genocidal rhetoric". In particular, CAIR criticized social media statements where Fine posted "#StarveAway" in response to a post regarding the starvation of Gaza's civilian population and a post in which Fine wrote that "Gaza must be destroyed."

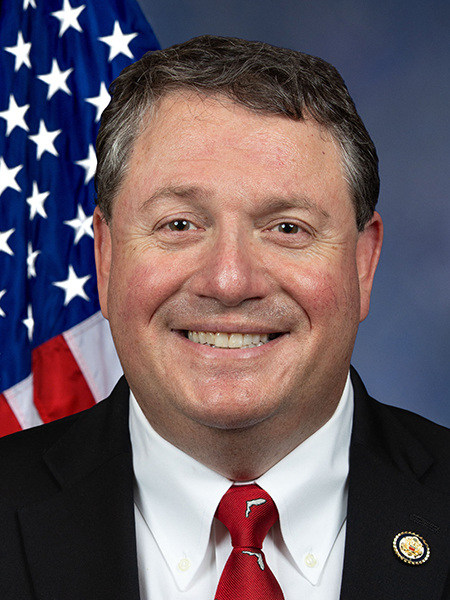
Official portrait, 2025

In October 2025, Fine introduced the No Sharia Act, which would prohibit the implementation of sharia law in the United States. Fine said that "We've seen what has happened in the UK and across Europe with the spread of Sharia, and it is not an exaggeration to say it is coming here next. Well, we are not going to let that happen."

Fine regularly wears a kippah on the House floor and when serving as Speaker pro tempore. He is believed to be the first person to wear a kippah from the speaker's podium.

=== Committee assignments ===
For the 119th Congress:

- Committee on Education and Workforce
  - Subcommittee on Health, Employment, Labor, and Pensions
  - Subcommittee on Higher Education and Workforce Development
  - Subcommittee on Workforce Protections
- Committee on Foreign Affairs
  - Subcommittee on Europe
  - Subcommittee on Western Hemisphere

=== Caucus memberships ===
- Freedom Caucus
- Republican Study Committee
- Sharia-Free America Caucus

== Political views ==
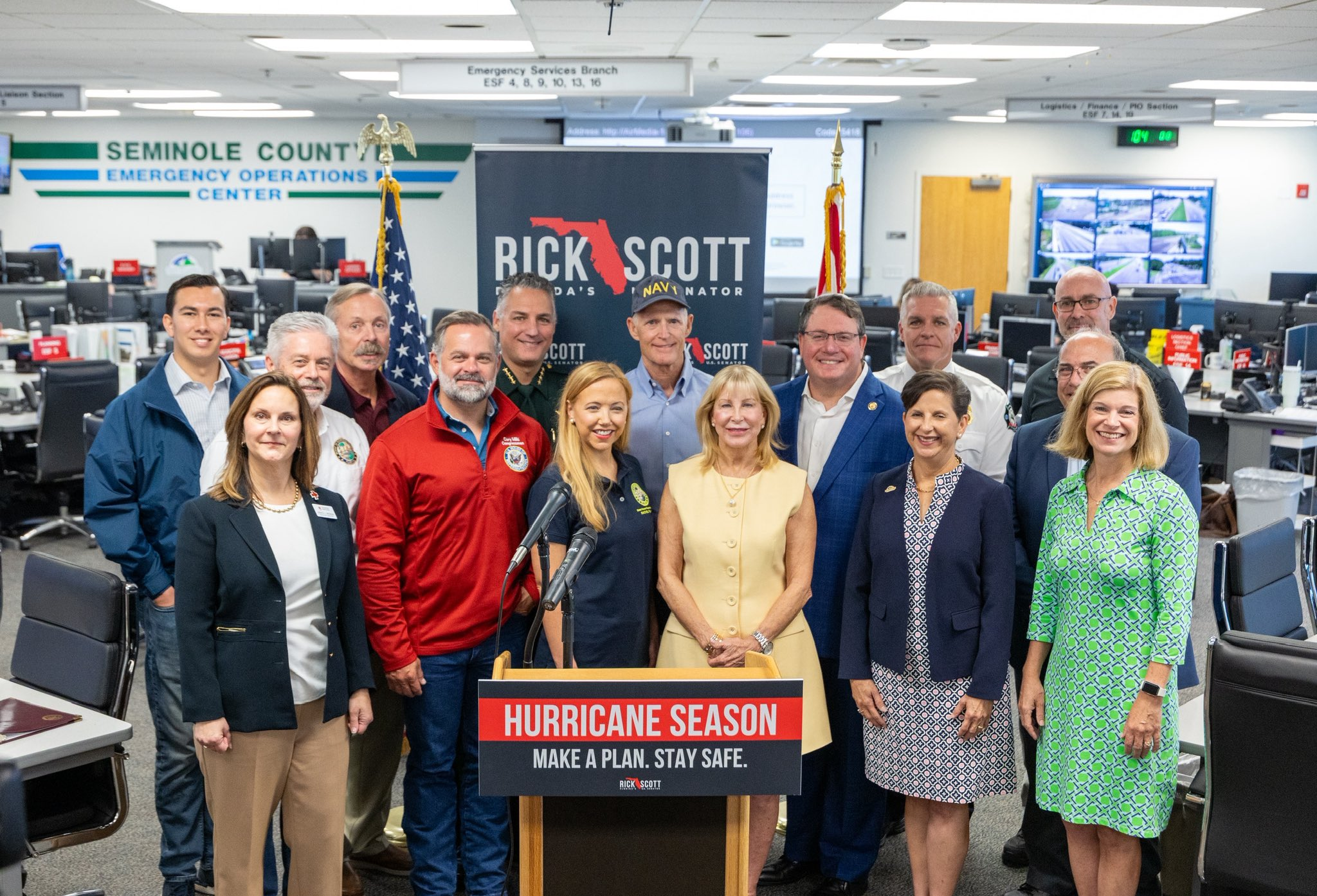
Fine with Senator Rick Scott, Congressman Cory Mills, Rep. Doug Bankson, Rep. Rachel Plakon, and Sheriff Dennis Lemma at the Seminole County Emergency Operations Center, May 2025

=== COVID-19 response ===
At the beginning of the COVID-19 pandemic in 2020, Fine said local leaders in Brevard County should take the pandemic more seriously. Fine said it was "a little bit crazy" that Brevard beaches were open to anybody. In 2021, Fine said people should take the COVID-19 vaccine. He opposed making the COVID-19 vaccine mandatory and he encouraged those who were not vaccinated to follow the CDC's recommendation and wear a mask in group settings. Fine has said that parents who wanted mask mandates at school could use the state's school voucher system and send their child to a private school with a mask requirement.

=== Crime ===
Fine co-sponsored a Florida bill imposing harsher penalties for offenses committed by people who are in the U.S. illegally than for everyone else, including a mandatory death sentence for first-degree murder and child rape committed by anyone who is in the U.S. illegally. In January 2021, he co-sponsored HB 1, which would increase criminal penalties for assaulting law enforcement officers. He has been endorsed by the International Union of Police Associations.

=== Education ===
Fine opined in 2022 that neither DEI nor critical race theory has any place in Florida's public schools. He is also in favor of giving all Florida families the ability to choose private or homeschooling, with the help of taxpayer money, by expanding school vouchers.

=== Environment ===
In 2020, Fine submitted legislation raising all existing fines by 50% for illegally discharging raw sewage into waterways.

=== Foreign policy ===
==== Greenland ====
In January 2026, Fine introduced the Greenland Annexation and Statehood Act in the House of Representatives. The legislation calls to authorize the President

to take such steps as may be necessary, including by seeking to enter into negotiations with the Kingdom of Denmark, to annex or otherwise acquire Greenland as territory of the United States.

==== Iran ====
During the Twelve-Day War, Fine expressed strong support for Israel's strikes, praising President Donald Trump as someone who "doesn't mess around" after Trump blamed Iran on Truth Social for failing to make a nuclear deal, and posting "bombs away" on Twitter. In response to a post from an account linked to the Iranian military stating, "Remember, we didn't initiate it," Fine replied, "And you won't get to finish it."

In an interview with the Washington Reporter, Fine called for Israel to "unleash Hell on Iran" in response to the Islamic Republic's retaliatory missile attacks on civilian targets in Israel. Fine described the Iranian strikes aimed at populated civilian centers, which he said numbered in the hundreds, as a "genocidal attack" and urged a strong retaliatory response against Iran's leadership. While maintaining a hawkish stance, referring to Iran's rulers as "Muslim lunatics" incompatible with Western values, Fine also praised President Donald Trump for his efforts to negotiate with Iran.

Following the 2025 United States strikes on Iranian nuclear sites, Fine took to Twitter to praise Trump's decision, saying, "Donald Trump has never let us down. I wrote this after October 7, 2023, when I endorsed him to return as President. I knew that when the world needed him, he would be there to save it." He then concluded the post with the message, "Bombs away."

==== Israel and Palestine ====
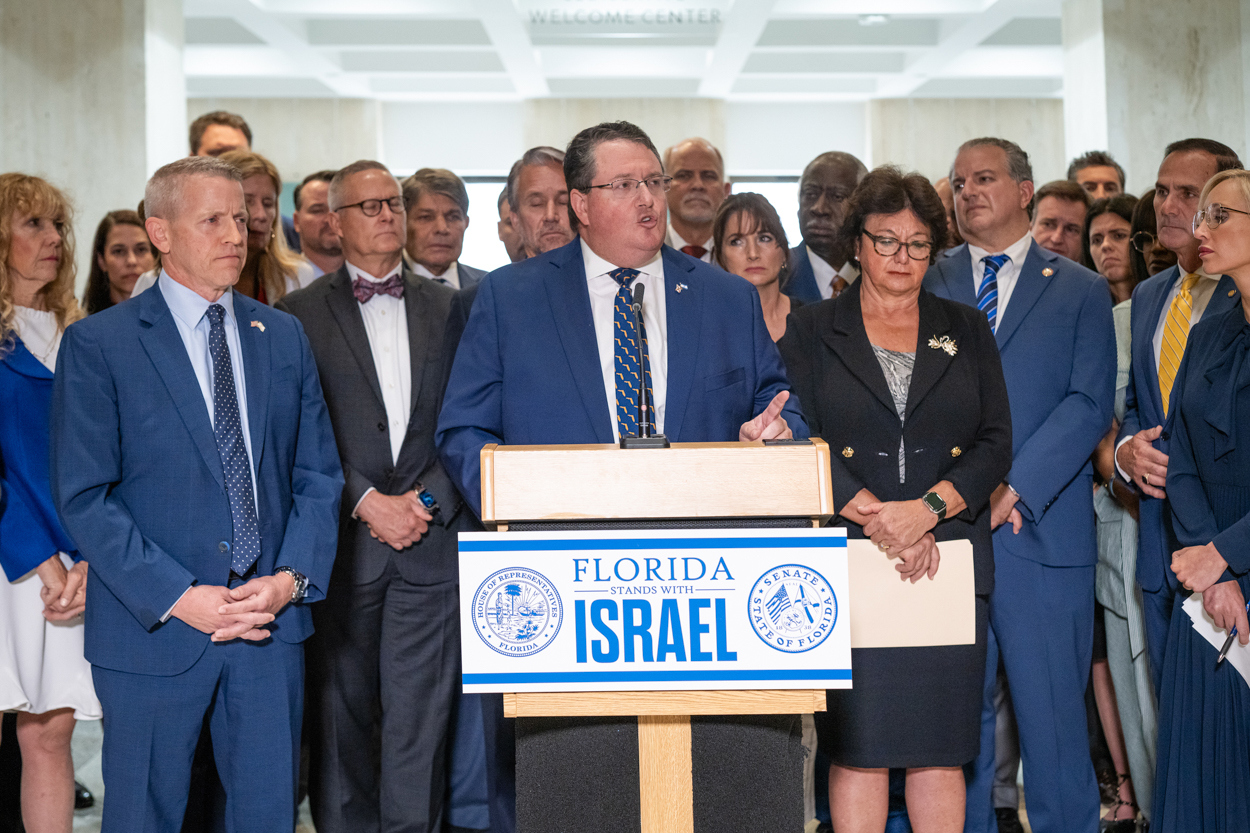
Fine speaking during the Florida Stands With Israel conference, 2023

In 2018, Fine demanded that venues in Miami and Tampa cancel scheduled concerts with the New Zealand singer Lorde because she had previously cancelled a concert in Israel after being urged to do so by activists from the BDS movement. According to Fine, allowing Lorde to play would violate an anti-BDS law enacted by the state in 2016. However Lorde's performances in Florida went ahead as scheduled.

In April 2019, Fine called Paul Halpern, a progressive Jewish constituent of his, a "Judenrat" for supporting an event which was sharply critical of the Israeli government during the Israeli–Palestinian conflict.

In May 2021, amid an ongoing crisis in Israel and Palestine, Fine made several posts and comments on his social media pages regarding Palestinians, including a celebration of the Israeli army's bombing of the Gaza Strip. Regarding the deaths of Palestinian children during the conflict, he said, "I don't personally feel bad when human shields are killed."

In October 2023, Fine switched his endorsement in the 2024 Republican Party presidential primaries from Ron DeSantis to Donald Trump over their reactions to antisemitism and the Gaza war. He lauded Trump for moving the United States embassy to Jerusalem, and for brokering a peace deal between Israel and two Arab countries.

On October 10, 2023, Fine arranged for "Regards from Randy Fine" to be written on a 155-mm artillery shell to be dropped on Gaza, and later arranged for messages on two more shells.

In November 2023, Fine voted against a Florida House of Representatives resolution calling for a ceasefire in the ongoing Gaza war. The resolution, introduced by Angie Nixon, only received two supporting votes and was unsuccessful. Fine asserted that anyone who voted for the resolution was anti-Semitic and "putting every Jewish child in the state at risk."

Fine called Ireland an "antisemitic country" after it recognized the State of Palestine in May 2024. He pledged to introduce a bill to ban Florida government entities from contracting with Irish, Norwegian, and Spanish companies, after the latter two countries also recognized Palestine. When Governor Ron DeSantis visited Ireland in August 2024 to attend the Florida State–Georgia Tech football game, Fine criticized the governor, saying, "I was certainly disappointed to see not only folks go to what is clearly an antisemitic country that supports Muslim terror, but I was also disappointed that the game wasn't cancelled, which it should have been."

Following the killing of Turkish-American citizen Ayşenur Ezgi Eygi by the Israel Defense Forces in September 2024, Fine tweeted "Throw rocks, get shot. One less #MuslimTerrorist. #FireAway," drawing a call by the Council on American–Islamic Relations (CAIR), a Muslim civil rights and advocacy organization, for the legislature to censure Fine.

In December 2024, Fine introduced a bill in the Florida Senate that would ban "flags with a political viewpoint" from being flown in Florida government buildings. He targeted the flag of Palestine, LGBTQ pride flags, and Black Lives Matter flags, though the bill itself does not specify those flags. In a press release, he called Palestine a "fictional country", referred to the Black Lives Matter movement as "pro-violence", and repeatedly promoted the homophobic LGBTQ grooming conspiracy theory, writing, "Supporters of Muslim terror, child mutilators, and groomers have no right to taxpayer sponsorship of their repugnant messages."

Fine said he planned to move to Israel along with his family had Kamala Harris won the 2024 United States presidential election.

After the remains of the kidnapped Bibas family mother and children were returned to Israel in February 2025, Fine claimed in a series of tweets that there was no such thing as innocent Palestinian civilians, called them "demons that live on Earth" who "deserve death", and said that "Gaza must be destroyed." CAIR repeated its call for Fine to be censured in response.

Following the 2025 killing of Israeli embassy workers in Washington, D.C. during which the alleged shooter shouted "Free Palestine", Fine called for the "complete and total surrender" of Gaza during an interview with Fox News. Fine said that "The Palestinian cause is an evil one ... We nuked the Japanese twice in order to get unconditional surrender. That needs to be the same here. There is something deeply deeply wrong with this culture, and it needs to be defeated." In response to people who interpreted this as Fine advocating for the use of nuclear weapons, Fine later explained that the comparison was regarding complete and total surrender, not the use of nuclear weapons. He also accused Palestinians of being incestuous "idiots". In The American Conservative, Jason Jones wrote that the Trump movement has "much more in common with the best representatives of the free Palestine movement" than Fine's "mass-murderous brand of Zionism." Jones wrote that Fine is a disgrace and should resign from Congress or his colleagues in Congress should force him out. Tucker Carlson also attacked Fine, writing "We hope he gets the help he needs."

In July 2025, amid increasing warnings about the famine in Gaza, Fine tweeted they should "starve away" until Israeli hostages were returned and dismissed the reporting on starving Palestinians as "a lie" and "Muslim terror propaganda". His post was condemned by the American Jewish Committee for making light of the humanitarian crisis. He subsequently repeated claims that the situation was a hoax and argued that laws should allow people to run over pro-Palestinian protestors blocking roads. Sometime after his tweets, Fine was removed from a database of pro-Israeli politicians maintained by AIPAC. Aaron Baker, Fine's Republican primary challenger in the 2025 and upcoming 2026 House election, accused Fine of "genocidal" rhetoric; and fellow 2026 Republican challenger Charles Gambaro denounced Fine's comments as "outrageous" and "unacceptable". Republican representative Marjorie Taylor Greene also commented, calling Fine's tweet "disgraceful".

In October 2025, Fine was re-endorsed by AIPAC for re-election.

In November 2025, at a Republican Jewish Coalition event, Fine called Tucker Carlson "the most dangerous antisemite in America", after Carlson hosted Nick Fuentes. Fine also denounced Marjorie Taylor Greene and Thomas Massie for opposing U.S. policies toward Israel. After Kevin Roberts, president of The Heritage Foundation, a conservative think tank, made a statement strongly backing Carlson, Fine said that he would no longer welcome the Heritage Foundation in his offices. Carlson responded to Fine's criticism, saying, "Someone texted a picture of – literally – a dead baby and [Fine] laughs at it...And let's just be honest, that is much worse than anything Nick Fuentes has said. Period."

==== Ukraine ====
Fine has criticized Ukrainian president Volodymyr Zelenskyy, calling for him to show more gratitude to President Trump for U.S. aid to Ukraine. Fine has expressed support for Trump's peace efforts to bring an end to the Russo-Ukrainian war and prevent "thousands more people dying". Fine has also suggested that Ukraine has "financial incentives for the war to never end".

=== Gun rights ===
Fine proposed a bill that would legalize concealed carry on college and university campuses. Fine said that, "Adults should have the right to protect themselves on campus, particularly after so many universities across America chose to protect Muslim terror advocates over their own students." In 2024, the NRA Political Victory Fund (NRA-PVF) endorsed Fine.

=== Immigration ===
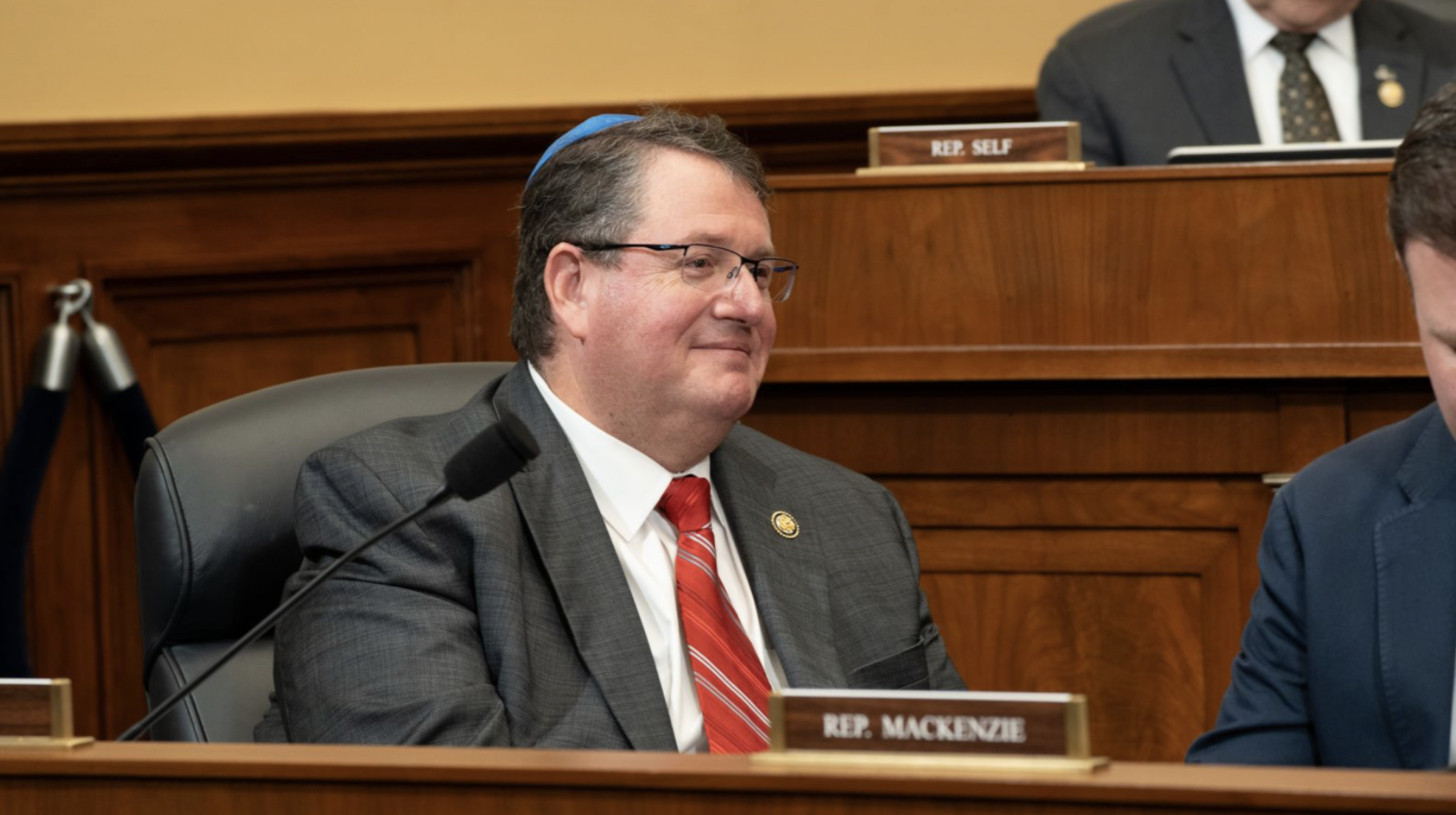
Fine on the floor of the House of Representatives

In 2024, Fine filed a bill pursuant to which undocumented immigrants would no longer be charged in-state tuition rates (under $6,000 per year, rather than out-of-state tuition of $30,000) at Florida colleges and universities. His office said that in 2021, $45 million in state monies went to provide the in-state rate to undocumented immigrants.

=== Comments on January 2026 ICE enforcement and Alex Pretti shooting ===
In January 2026, Fine drew widespread condemnation for social media posts regarding the fatal shootings of civilians by federal immigration agents in Minneapolis. On January 24, 2026, following the killing of Alex Pretti, a 37-year-old VA nurse and U.S. citizen shot by federal agents during a protest, Fine posted a message on Twitter congratulating federal agents for the "well done" killing of what he described as an "armed seditionist" and "insurrectionist".

The comments were widely criticized by community leaders and civil rights organizations. The Council on American-Islamic Relations (CAIR) called for a formal congressional condemnation, describing Fine's rhetoric as "dangerously inciting" and "morally reprehensible". Critics noted that Fine's characterization of Pretti as a "terrorist" contradicted bystander video evidence and statements from the Minneapolis Police Department confirming Pretti was a lawful gun owner with a valid permit to carry who never drew his weapon or made threats.

=== LGBT rights ===
Fine has repeatedly made unsubstantiated allegations that gay and lesbian people are "grooming" minors and while defending a bill banning anyone under the age of 18 from being able to attend a drag show, said: "If it means erasing a community because you have to target children, then, damn right, we ought to do it!" He supported the Florida Parental Rights in Education Act, dubbed the "Don't Say Gay Bill", that prohibits public schools from having classroom discussion or instruction about sexual orientation or gender identity from kindergarten through 3rd grade, or in a manner deemed to be against state standards in all grades; it passed, and was signed by the governor.

In April 2021, Fine was one of 77 Republicans in the House to vote yes on bill CS/HB 1475, which bars transgender girls and women from playing on girls' sports teams at public schools; it passed, and was signed by the governor.

Fine proposed a 2023 bill to ban drag performances where children might be in attendance. Opponents of the bill said it would ban his own wife's "sultry performances" at the Spring Forward for Autism gala, which benefits a children's charity. NBC News reported that video of previous years' galas, where his wife performed, confirmed that toddlers were in attendance, and Business Insider reported that in previous years children performed alongside adults at the galas. In 2023, the gala included a performances by Rainbow Circus Miami, and Randy Fine was one of the gala's prominent sponsors.

=== Muslims ===
Fine has a long history of making anti-Palestinian and anti-Muslim statements. "If you're not an Islamophobe, you're a fool," Fine told Jewish Currents. "I don't think every Muslim is a bad person, but I think that there's an awful lot who are." Fine wrote in 2023 that "while many Muslims are not terrorists, they are the radicals, not the mainstream." In a 2025 congressional hearing on the Israeli–Palestinian conflict, Fine told Morton Klein, president of the Zionist Organization of America, "I'm not afraid of [being called Islamophobic]." Fine went on to say, "I don't know how you make peace with those who seek your destruction. I think you destroy them first." This remark was interpreted as referring to Palestinians, and Fine subsequently said he was suggesting that "mainstream Muslims" should be destroyed. When he was a state representative, Fine collaborated with the Center for Security Policy, which is designated a hate group by the Southern Poverty Law Center for its anti-Muslim views, to write legislation restricting the activity of the Council for Islamic-American Relations. Fine supports the mass expulsion of Muslims from the United States, calling for a Muslim immigration ban, the mass deportation of "legal and illegal" Muslim immigrants, and the denaturalization of Muslim Americans with U.S. citizenship, and has publicly identified himself as a supporter of Islamophobia, stating that "mainstream Muslims" should be destroyed for their alleged refusal to make peace with Israel. In March 2026, Fine wrote that "We need more Islamophobia, not less. Fear of Islam is rational."

After the 2025 New Orleans truck attack, which was committed by an American-born convert to Islam whose truck was flying the flag of the radical Islamist terror group ISIS as he killed 15 people, Fine called for non-citizen supporters of "Muslim terror" to be deported. He wrote on Twitter that "Muslim terror has attacked the United States — again. The blood is on the hands of those who refuse to acknowledge the worldwide #MuslimProblem." Trump ally Richard Grenell criticized Fine's post and said it was not helpful.

At a public hearing Fine chaired in March 2025, he was booed by attendees after he said "enjoy your terrorist rag" to a member of the public wearing a keffiyeh. Fine responded by saying "I'm the chairman, I can say what I want."

Following the victory of Zohran Mamdani, who is Muslim, in the 2025 New York City Democratic mayoral primary, Fine made unsubstantiated claims that Mamdani wanted to start a "caliphate" in New York City and wrote that "If Mamdani has his way, NYC classrooms won't be teaching the Constitution in civics class. They'll be teaching Sharia Law." He said that Mamdani could transform New York City the way Ruhollah Khomeini and Ali Khamenei transformed Tehran, and argued that radical Muslims must not be allowed to turn America into a "Shiite caliphate."

In a July 2025 tweet, Fine falsely accused Rep. Ilhan Omar of being a "Muslim terrorist". Democratic leaders demanded an apology, with Rep. Pete Aguilar calling the comment "unhinged, racist and Islamophobic" and "bigoted and disgusting".

In October 2025, Fine again attacked Mamdani, calling him "little more than a Muslim terrorist", while also saying that his citizenship should be stripped and that Mamdani should be "deported to the Ugandan shithole he came from."

In January 2026, Fine was named a founding member of the Sharia-Free America Caucus in Congress, which seeks to ban Sharia law. In February 2026, the Council on American–Islamic Relations (CAIR) designated the caucus an anti-Muslim hate group, stating its agenda "would effectively ban the practice of the world's second largest religion in the United States."

In February 2026, in response to a post by pro-Palestinian activist Nerdeen Kiswani calling dogs "unclean", Fine wrote that "If they force us to choose, the choice between dogs and Muslims is not a difficult one." Multiple Democratic members of Congress condemned Fine's post and said he should either resign from Congress or be censured. Democratic Governor Gavin Newsom tweeted at Fine, saying "Resign now, you racist slob."; Republican politician Charles Gambaro wrote that Fine "wears his bigotry like a badge of honor...Randy Fine continues to be an unhinged public official that has absolutely no business serving in Congress", while Megyn Kelly called Fine a "pathetic sweaty man". Republican Rep. Don Bacon stated "I appreciate Randy Fine for many things, but I don’t agree with this. We should be respectful to others." Rep. Mark Harris made a statement in support of Fine.

=== Armenians ===
On April 30, 2026, Fine was criticized after he stated: "We don’t want Armenians to be able to serve in Congress," during an interview with Jenny Beth Martin on The Jenny Beth Show, as a response against Dan Bilzerian's attempt to run against Fine during the 2026 United States elections in Florida's 6th congressional district. On May 3, Fine doubled down his comment on Twitter, writing: "Armenians should not serve in Congress. Neither should Somalis. Or Guatemalans. Or — wait for it — Israelis. If you are a citizen of a foreign country, you shouldn't serve in ours."

His remarks received condemnation by the Armenian National Committee of America (ANCA), accusing Fine of anti-Armenian sentiment and criticized him over legislation connected to US policy toward Azerbaijan during the offensive in Nagorno-Karabakh in 2023. Fine's comments also received condemnations by other members of Congress, including Brad Sherman, Laura Friedman, Brendan Boyle and Delia Ramirez.

== Personal life ==
Fine speaking at a Republican Jewish Coalition event in August 2026

Fine married his first wife, Anne Price, in 1996. They met while working for Students for an Energy Efficient Environment Inc. Fine and his second wife, Wendy, have two sons.

Fine formerly attended a Conservative Jewish synagogue in Melbourne. However, Fine quit the synagogue after allegedly threatening to "burn it to the ground" when the synagogue hired an LGBTQ+ employee.

In August 2026, while canvassing for his midterm campaign, Fine was captured on video going through a constituent's mailbox.

=== Residence ===
In 2007, Fine and his wife purchased a two-bedroom 4,000 square foot home in Melbourne Beach, to which they added 4,500 square feet at a cost, with improvements to the original space, of $1,000,000.

In 2020, Republican state Representative Tom Leek filed a complaint against Fine, accusing him of illegally holding office in Florida. Leek noted that under Florida law, state representatives are required to live within their districts. Fine later rented an empty condominium, in the district where he is registered to vote, raising allegations of voter fraud against Fine.

In 2025, Fine drew scrutiny from other Republicans for living in Melbourne Beach, which falls outside of Florida's 6th congressional district, and instead in the 8th congressional district. Ron DeSantis, Charles Gambaro, and Will Furry criticized Fine and labeled him a carpetbagger.

== See also ==
- List of United States representatives from Florida
- List of Harvard University politicians
- List of Jewish members of the United States Congress
- List of new members of the 119th United States Congress

U.S. House of Representatives
Preceded by Mike Waltz	Member of the U.S. House of Representatives from Florida's 6th congressional district 2025–present	Incumbent
U.S. order of precedence (ceremonial)
Preceded by George T. Whitesides	United States representatives by seniority 423rd	Succeeded by Jimmy Patronis
