= Glossen =

Glossen (Marginal Notes), opus 163, is a waltz composed by Johann Strauss II in 1855. The work was dedicated to the students of law at the Vienna University on the occasion of their ball held at the Sofienbaad-Saal, which was attended by 1200 or so guests. The title of the composition refers to explanatory notes appearing in margins of draft statutes prior to their becoming law.
