= John M. McKay =

American politician

John McKay
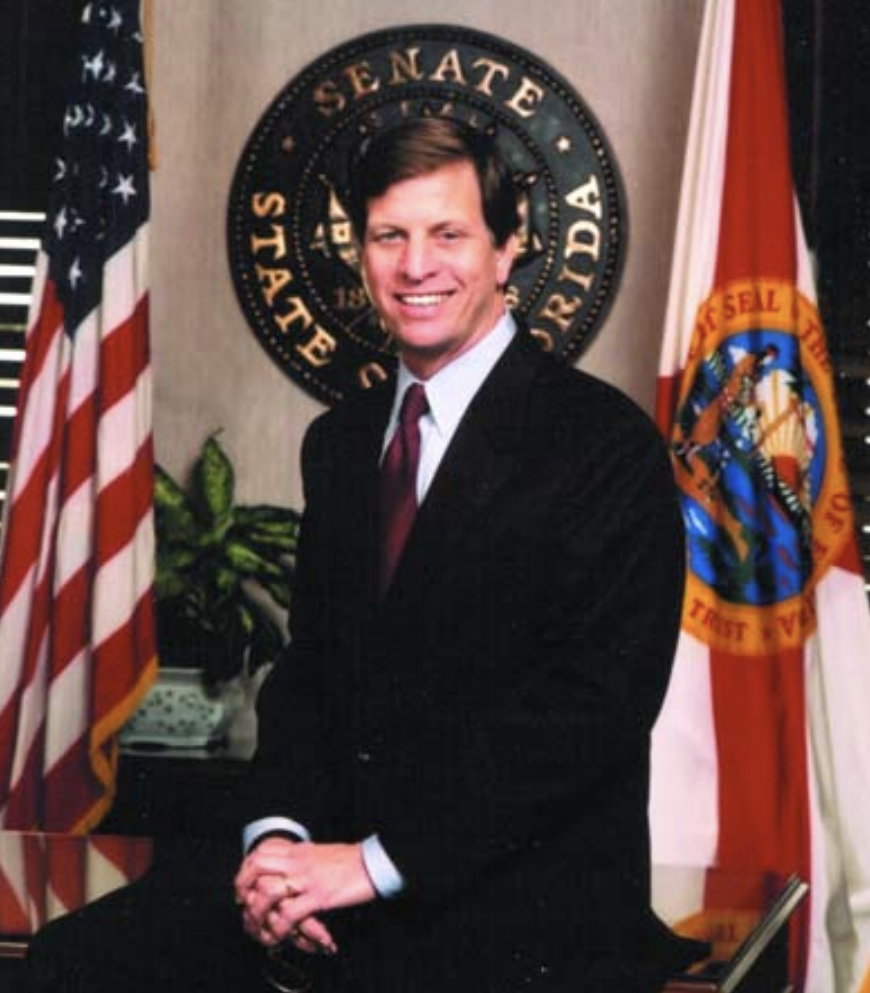

President of the Florida Senate
- In office November 21, 2000 – November 5, 2002
- Preceded by: Toni Jennings
- Succeeded by: Jim King

Member of the Florida Senate
- In office November 6, 1990 – November 5, 2002
- Preceded by: Marlene Woodson Howard
- Succeeded by: Mike Bennett (redistricting)
- Constituency: 24th district (1990–1992); 26th district (1992–2002)

Personal details
- Born: September 23, 1948 (age 77) Winter Haven, Florida
- Party: Republican
- Children: Mary Patricia, Sara Jane, Meredith
- Relatives: Donald Brenham McKay (great-uncle)
- Education: Florida State University (B.S.)
- Occupation: mortgage broker

John M. McKay (born September 23, 1948) is a Republican politician who served as a member of the Florida Senate from the 24th and 26th districts from 1990 to 2002, and as President of the Florida Senate from 2000 to 2002.

== Early life and career ==
McKay was born in Winter Haven, Florida. He attended Florida State University, receiving his bachelor's degree in 1991. He worked as a mortgage broker before transitioning into commercial land development in Sarasota.

== Florida Senate ==
In 1990, Republican State Senator Marlene Woodson Howard opted to run for Governor and challenge incumbent Governor Bob Martinez in the Republican primary, rather than seek re-election. McKay ran to succeed her in the 24th district, which included Charlotte, DeSoto, Hardee, Lee, and Manatee counties. He faced Tom Spivey, a truck manager at a local car dealership, in the Republican primary. He defeated Spivey in a landslide, receiving 69 percent of the vote to Spivey's 31 percent. In the general election, he faced Democratic nominee Ed Chiles, a restaurateur and the son of former U.S. Senator Lawton Chiles. McKay narrowly defeated Chiles, winning 53 percent of the vote to Chiles's 47 percent.

In 1992, following the reconfiguration of the state's legislative districts after the 1990 Census, McKay ran for re-election in the 26th district, which included much of the territory he had previously represented, but which swapped parts of northern Charlotte and Lee counties for Highlands County. He was challenged by Bradenton Beach City Councilwoman Gale Carter, the Democratic nominee. He defeated Carter by a wide margin, winning 59 percent of the vote to her 41 percent.

McKay ran for re-election in 1994, and was challenged by forklift operator Robert Hertig, who won the Democratic nomination. He defeated Hertig in a landslide, receiving 72 percent of the vote to Hertig's 28 percent.

In 1996, McKay's wife testified during their divorce trial that McKay had an extramarital affair with a lobbyist for Sprint, which prompted him to resign as Chairman of the Senate Ways and Means Committee. While serving as Chairman of the Senate Commerce Committee, McKay had engaged in the extramarital affair while overseeing the state's deregulation of local phone services, which prompted an inquiry by an independent counsel, who ultimately cleared McKay of wrongdoing. In 1997, after their divorce, McKay's ex-wife accused him of assault, which prompted a judge to issue a temporary injunction barring McKay from being within 200 feet of his ex-wife. McKay denied assaulting his ex-wife, and prosecutors ultimately declined to bring charges.

McKay was unopposed for re-election in 1998, despite rumors that State Representatives Mark Flanagan or Mark Ogles would challenge him in the Republican primary.

In 1999, McKay was elected by the Republican caucus in the State Senate as Senate President-designate, slating him to take over as State Senate President following the 2000 elections. After Republicans retained a majority in the State Senate in 2000, McKay became Senate President, and named Ginny Brown-Waite as Senate President pro tempore.
