= 2016 United States Senate election in Florida =

- November 8, 2016
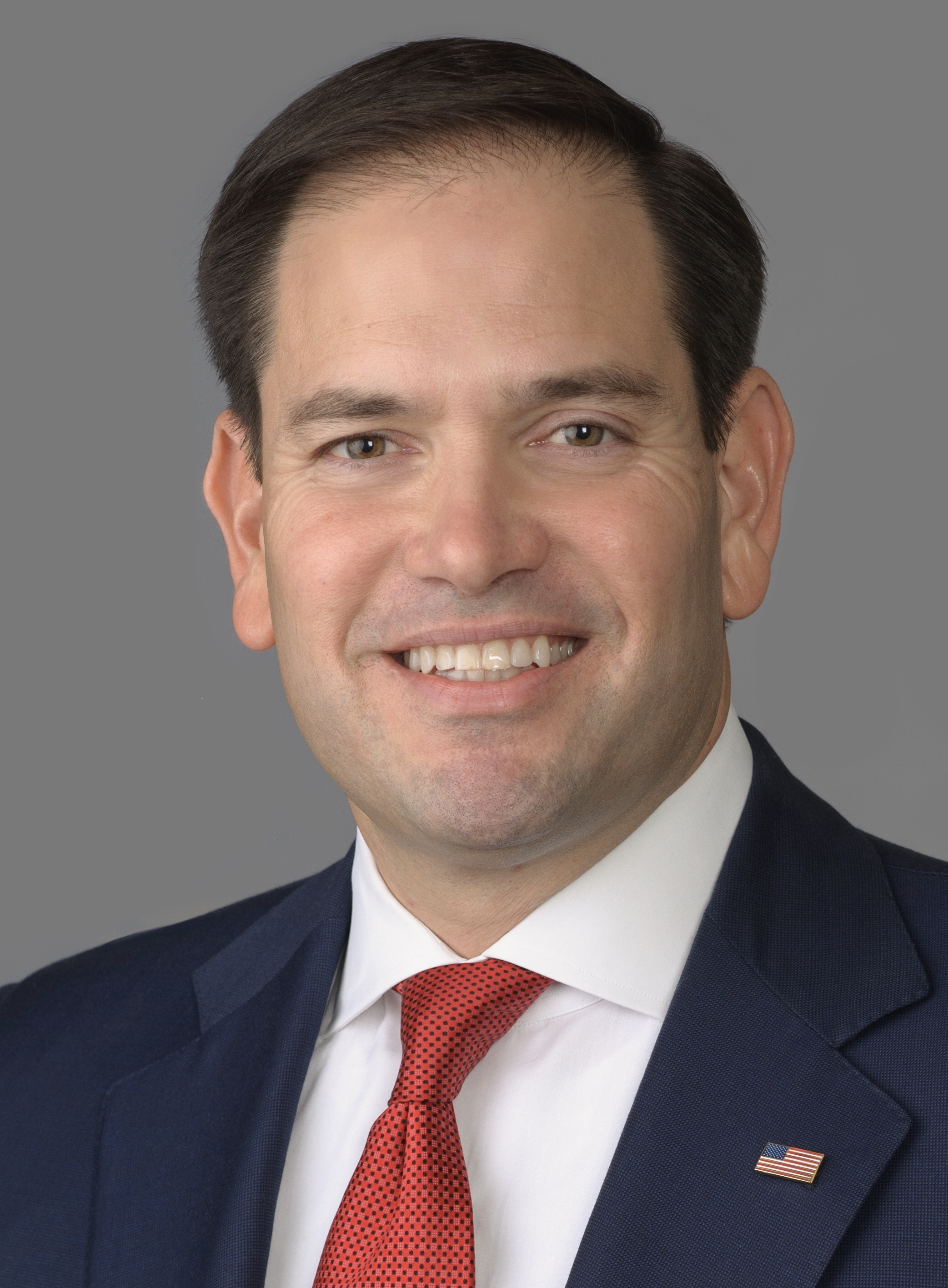

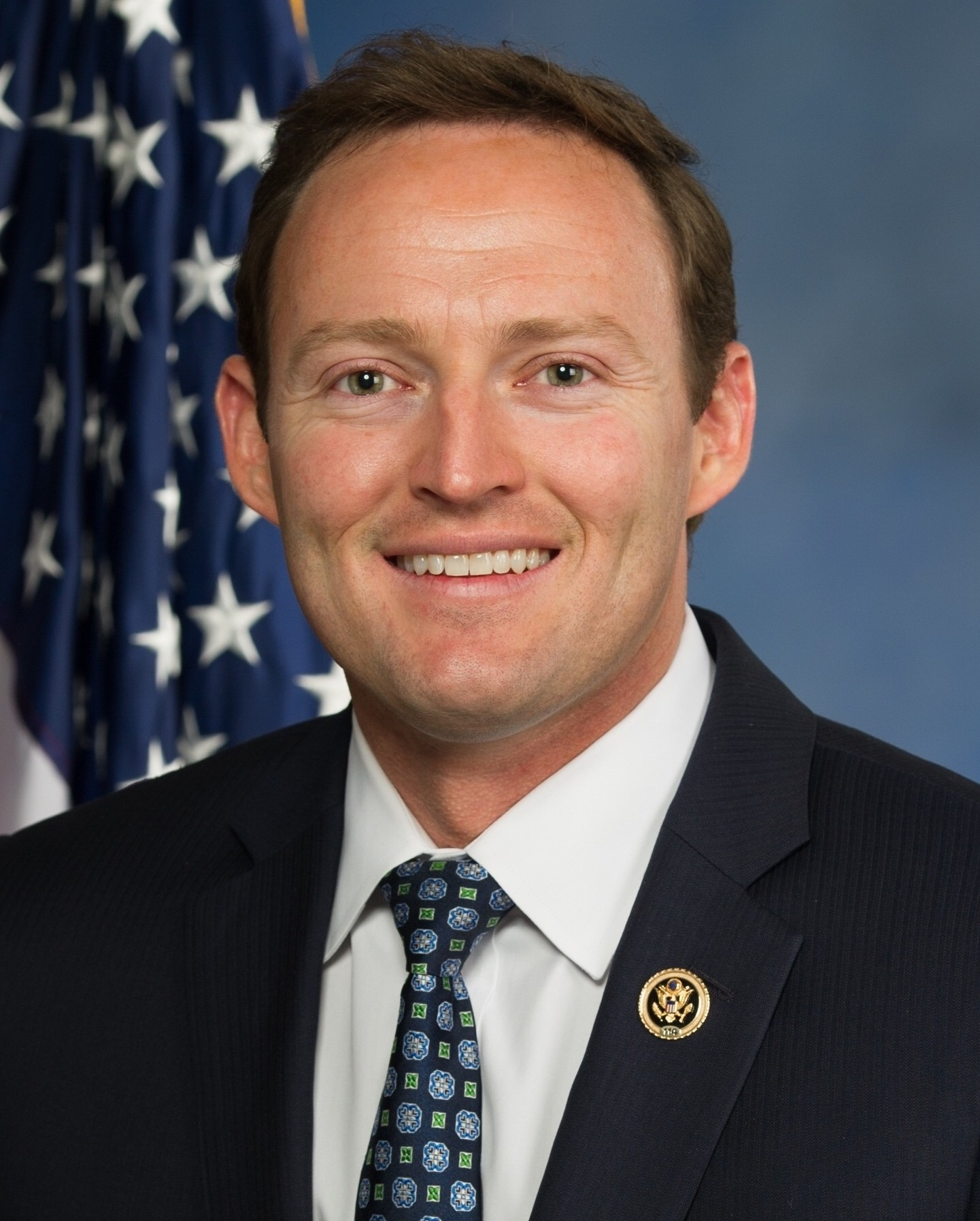
Nominee	Marco Rubio	Patrick Murphy
Party	Republican	Democratic
Popular vote	4,835,191	4,122,088
Percentage	51.98%	44.31%
- Rubio: 40–50% 50–60% 60–70% 70–80% 80–90% >90% Murphy: 40–50% 50–60% 60–70% 70–80% 80–90% >90% Tie: 40–50% 50% No votes
U.S. senator before election
Marco Rubio
Republican
Elected U.S. Senator
Marco Rubio
Republican

The 2016 United States Senate election in Florida was held on November 8, 2016 to elect a member of the United States Senate to represent the State of Florida, concurrently with the 2016 U.S. presidential election, other elections to the United States Senate in other states, elections to the United States House of Representatives, and various state and local elections. The primary elections for both the Republicans and Democrats took place on August 30, 2016.

Incumbent Republican senator Marco Rubio ran for another term, but faced well-funded Republican primary opposition after initially announcing he would not seek re-election to his Senate seat. He had openly considered whether to seek re-election or run for president in 2016. He stated in April 2014 that he would not run for both the Senate and president in 2016, as Florida law prohibits a candidate from simultaneously appearing twice on a ballot, but did not rule out running for either office.

However, in April 2015, Rubio announced that he was running for president and would not seek re-election. He had initially said he would not run for re-election to the Senate even if he dropped out of the GOP presidential primary before he would have to qualify for the 2016 Senate primary ballot, for which the filing deadline was June 24, 2016.

On June 13, 2016, despite his previous statements that he would not run for re-election to his Senate seat, Rubio "seemed to open the door to running for re-election," citing the previous day's mass shooting in Orlando and how "it really gives you pause, to think a little bit about your service to your country and where you can be most useful to your country." On June 22, 2016, Rubio announced that he would seek re-election to the Senate, reversing his pledge not to run.

On August 30, the Republican Party nominated Marco Rubio, and the Democratic Party nominated Representative Patrick Murphy. Rubio won with the largest raw vote total in Florida history (until Donald Trump broke the record in 2020), taking a greater percentage of the popular vote than Republican presidential nominee Donald Trump, who won the state in the election. He is the first Republican Senator from Florida since 1994, and only the second with Connie Mack, to be reelected to a second term. Also, Mel Martinez's victory in 2004 marks the first time that Republicans had won one of Florida's Senate seats three times in a row (Mack succeeded Lawton Chiles, a Democrat, and was succeeded by another Democrat, Bill Nelson).

Marco Rubio won 48% of the Hispanic vote and 17% of the African American vote during this election, at the time considered an exceptional number for a Republican during a presidential year. Additionally, Rubio's raw vote total was the highest vote total for any Republican Senate candidate up until Texas senator John Cornyn broke it in 2020.

Rubio would later win by a larger 16.4% margin in 2022, including winning a majority of Hispanic voters in Florida.

== Republican primary ==
=== Candidates ===
==== Declared ====
- Carlos Beruff, real estate developer and chair of the Florida Commission on Healthcare and Hospital Funding
- Ernie Rivera, businessman
- Marco Rubio, incumbent U.S. senator
- Dwight Young, Pinellas County sheriff's deputy

==== Withdrawn ====
- Ron DeSantis, U.S. representative (ran for reelection)
- Mary Elisabeth Godwin, pastor
- David Jolly, U.S. representative (ran for reelection)
- Carlos Lopez-Cantera, lieutenant governor of Florida
- Todd Wilcox, businessman and former CIA case officer

==== Declined ====
- Jeff Atwater, chief financial officer of Florida
- Rick Baker, former mayor of St. Petersburg
- Pam Bondi, Florida attorney general
- Dan Bongino, radio host, former Secret Service agent, and nominee for the U.S. Senate from Maryland in 2012 and for MD-06 in 2014 (running for FL-19)
- Vern Buchanan, U.S. representative (ran for reelection)
- Ben Carson, retired neurosurgeon and former candidate for president in 2016
- Curt Clawson, U.S. representative
- Randy Fine, businessman
- Anitere Flores, state senator (ran for reelection)
- Don Gaetz, state senator and former state senate president
- Mike Haridopolos, former president of the Florida Senate and candidate for the U.S. Senate in 2012
- George LeMieux, former U.S. senator
- Connie Mack IV, former U.S. representative and nominee for the U.S. Senate in 2012
- Bill McCollum, former Florida attorney general, former U.S. representative, nominee for U.S. Senate in 2000, candidate in 2004 and candidate for governor in 2010
- John Mica, U.S. representative (ran for reelection)
- Jeff Miller, U.S. representative
- Adam Putnam, Florida Commissioner of Agriculture and former U.S. representative
- Francis Rooney, former United States Ambassador to the Holy See (ran for U.S. House)
- Tom Rooney, U.S. representative (ran for reelection)
- Dennis A. Ross, U.S. representative (ran for reelection)
- Joe Scarborough, cable news personality and former U.S. representative
- Will Weatherford, former speaker of the Florida House of Representatives
- Daniel Webster, U.S. representative
- Allen West, former U.S. representative
- Ted Yoho, U.S. representative (ran for reelection)

=== Endorsements ===
Ron DeSantis (withdrew)

Individuals

- Marsha Blackburn, U.S. representative (TN-07)
- John R. Bolton, former United States Ambassador to the United Nations
- Dan Bongino, former U.S. Secret Service agent and U.S. House and Senate candidate
- Ben Carson, retired neurosurgeon and former candidate for President in 2016
- Jim France, NASCAR executive
- Trey Gowdy, U.S. representative (SC-4)
- Sean Jackson, chairman of the Black Republican Caucus of South Florida
- Mike Lee, U.S. senator from Utah
- Bob Martinez, former Florida governor
- John Rood, former U.S. ambassador
- Francis Rooney, former U.S. ambassador to the Vatican
- Tom Rooney, U.S. representative (FL-17)

Organizations

- Citizens United
- Club for Growth
- Combat Veterans for Congress
- Conservative HQ
- Family Research Council
- FreedomWorks
- Madison Project PAC
- Senate Conservatives Fund
- Support and Defend PAC
- Tea Party Express
David Jolly (withdrew)

Individuals

- Gus Bilirakis, U.S. representative (FL-12)
- Rich Nugent, U.S. representative (FL-11)
- Dennis A. Ross, U.S. representative (FL-15)
Carlos López-Cantera (withdrew)

Statewide officials

- Pam Bondi, attorney general of Florida

State legislators

- Ben Albritton, state representative
- Frank Artiles, state representative
- Bryan Avila, state representative
- Dennis K. Baxley, state representative
- Halsey Beshears, state representative
- Michael Bileca, state representative
- Jim Boyd, state representative
- Jason Brodeur, state representative
- Matt Caldwell, state representative
- Bob Cortes, state representative
- José Félix Díaz, state representative
- Manny Díaz, Jr., state representative
- Miguel Diaz de la Portilla, state senator
- Brad Drake, state representative
- Dane Eagle, state representative
- Heather Fitzenhagen, state representative
- Anitere Flores, state senator
- Erik Fresen, state representative
- Bill Galvano, state senate majority leader
- Rene Garcia, state senator
- Julio Gonzalez, state representative
- Tom Goodson, state representative
- Clay Ingram, state representative
- Mike La Rosa, state representative
- MaryLynn Magar, state representative
- George Moraitis, state representative
- Jeanette Nuñez, state representative
- H. Marlene O'Toole, state representative
- José R. Oliva, state representative
- Kathleen Passidomo, state representative
- Keith Perry, state representative
- Ray Pilon, state representative
- Scott Plakon, state representative
- Rene Plasencia, state representative
- Elizabeth W. Porter, state representative
- Holly Merrill Raschein, state representative
- Ken Roberson, state representative
- David Santiago, state representative
- Jimmie Todd Smith, state representative
- Carlos Trujillo, state representative
- Ritch Workman, state representative

Mayors and other municipal leaders

- Sam Newby, Jacksonville city councilman
Marco Rubio

Presidents of the United States

- George W. Bush, 43rd president of The United States

Governors

- Jeb Bush, former governor of Florida and 2016 presidential candidate
- Bill Haslam, governor of Tennessee
- Mike Huckabee, former governor of Arkansas and 2016 presidential candidate
- John Kasich, governor of Ohio and 2016 presidential candidate
- George Pataki, former governor of New York and 2016 presidential candidate
- Mike Pence, governor of Indiana and 2016 vice presidential nominee
- Mitt Romney, former governor of Massachusetts and 2012 Republican presidential nominee

U.S. senators

- John Cornyn, U.S. senator from Texas and Senate Majority Whip
- Ted Cruz, U.S. senator from Texas and 2016 presidential candidate
- Lindsey Graham, U.S. senator from South Carolina and 2016 presidential candidate
- Mike Lee, U.S. senator from Utah
- Mitch McConnell, U.S. senator from Kentucky and Senate majority leader
- Rick Santorum, former U.S. senator from Pennsylvania, 2012 presidential candidate and 2016 presidential candidate

U.S. representatives

- Newt Gingrich, former Speaker of the House of Representatives and 2012 presidential candidate
- Paul Ryan, U.S. representative from Wisconsin and speaker of the United States House of Representatives

Individuals

- John Bolton, former United States Ambassador to the United Nations
- Carly Fiorina, former CEO of Hewlett-Packard, 2010 Republican nominee for Senate in California, and 2016 presidential candidate
- Sean Hannity, conservative talk radio host and host of Hannity
- Evan McMullin, former chief policy director for the House Republican Conference in the U.S. House of Representatives, former CIA operations officer and 2016 independent candidate for president
- Reince Priebus, Republican National Committee chairman
- Donald Trump, chairman and CEO of the Trump Organization and 2016 presidential nominee

Organizations

- American Conservative Union
- Club for Growth
- FreedomWorks
- United States Chamber of Commerce

Statewide officials

- Carlos López-Cantera, lieutenant governor of Florida and former 2016 U.S. Senate candidate in Florida

Newspaper editorial boards

- Miami Herald
- Orlando Sentinel
Declined to endorse
- Rick Scott, governor of Florida

=== Polling ===
Poll source	Date(s) administered	Sample size	Margin of error	Carlos Beruff	Ron DeSantis	David Jolly	Ilya Katz	Carlos López-Cantera	Marco Rubio	Todd Wilcox	Other/ Undecided
Mason-Dixon	August 22–24, 2016	400	± 5%	22%	—	—	—	—	61%	—	15%
Florida Atlantic University	August 19–22, 2016	327	± 5.4%	8%	—	—	—	—	69%	5%	15%
Florida Chamber of Commerce	August 17–22, 2016	249	± 4.0%	19%	—	—	—	—	68%	—	10%
St. Leo University	August 14–18, 2016	479	± 4.5%	14%	—	—	—	—	68%	—	18%
Suffolk University	August 1–3, 2016	183	± 4.4%	12%	–	–	–	–	62%	–	26%
St. Pete Polls	August 2, 2016	1,835	± 2.3%	22%	–	–	–	–	55%	–	23%
Bay News 9/SurveyUSA	June 25–27, 2016	555	± 4.1%	11%	–	–	–	–	63%	–	13%
Vox Populi Polling (R)	June 19–20, 2016	487	± 4.4%	5%	–	–	–	–	57%	4%	34%
	June 13, 2016	Rubio enters the race									
St. Leo University	June 10–16, 2016	500	± 7%	4%	5%	4%	1%	3%	52%	2%	27%
St. Leo University	June 10–16, 2016	500	± 7%	8%	8%	8%	2%	9%	–	5%	57%
Mason-Dixon	May 31–June 2, 2016	400	± 5%	17%	10%	13%	–	9%	–	2%	49%
News 13/Bay News 9	March 4–6, 2016	724	± 3.7%	1%	11%	18%	4%	9%	–	7%	50%
Washington Post/Univision	March 2–5, 2016	450	± 5.5%	0%	6%	5%	–	6%	–	2%	81%
Public Policy Polling	February 24–25, 2016	464	± 4.6%	–	14%	26%	–	11%	–	2%	47%
Florida Atlantic University College of Business	January 15–18, 2016	345	± 5.2%	–	8%	28%	–	8%	–	–	57%
St. Pete Polls/Saint Petersblog	December 14–15, 2015	2,694	± 1.9%	–	18%	21%	–	10%	–	8%	44%
St. Leo University	November 29 – December 3, 2015	147	± 8%	–	6%	12%	4%	8%	–	7%	63%
Public Policy Polling	September 11–13, 2015	377	± 5.1%	–	15%	18%	–	14%	–	–	52%

Hypothetical polling

Poll source	Date(s) administered	Sample size	Margin of error	Vern Buchanan	Ben Carson	Ron DeSantis	Don Gaetz	David Jolly	George LeMieux	Carlos López-Cantera	Bill McCollum	Jeff Miller	Tom Rooney	Todd Wilcox	Other/ Undecided
News 13/Bay News 9	March 4–6, 2016	724	± 3.7%	–	56%	–	–	–	–	–	–	–	–	–	44%
Mason-Dixon	July 20–24, 2015	500	± 4.5%	–	–	8%	–	11%	–	7%	22%	6%	–	1%	45%
Mason-Dixon	July 20–24, 2015	500	± 4.5%	–	–	9%	–	16%	–	10%	–	8%	–	2%	55%
St. Pete Polls	July 15, 2015	1,074	± 3.0%	–	—	9%	—	22%	—	11%	—	12%	—	–	46%
Gravis Marketing	June 16—20, 2015	729	± 3.6%	–	—	16%	—	—	—	7%	25%	6%	—	–	46%
St. Leo University	May 25–31, 2015	425	± 4.5%	–	—	6%	4%	6%	3%	7%	16%	8%	—	–	43%
Mason-Dixon	Apr. 14–16, 2015	425	± 4.8%	7%	–	4%	1%	8%	3%	4%	20%	—	5%	–	48%

Poll source	Date(s) administered	Sample size	Margin of error	Jeff Atwater	Pam Bondi	Carlos López-Cantera	Adam Putnam	Allen West	Other/ Undecided
Public Policy Polling	March 19–22, 2015	425	± 4.8%	12%	25%	8%	—	38%	18%
Public Policy Polling	March 19–22, 2015	425	± 4.8%	41%	—	15%	—	—	43%
Gravis Marketing	February 24–25, 2015	513	± 4%	9%	36%	—	12%	—	43%
Public Policy Polling	September 4–7, 2014	818	± 3.4%	17%	38%	—	16%	—	29%

=== Results ===
Republican primary results
Party	Candidate	Votes	%
Republican	Marco Rubio (incumbent)	1,029,830	71.99%
Republican	Carlos Beruff	264,427	18.49%
Republican	Dwight Young	91,082	6.37%
Republican	Ernie Rivera	45,153	3.16%
Total votes		1,430,492	100.00%

== Democratic primary ==
=== Candidates ===
==== Declared ====
- Rocky De La Fuente, businessman, candidate for president in 2016, and American Delta Party and Reform Party nominee for president in 2016
- Alan Grayson, U.S. representative
- Pam Keith, attorney, former judge advocate in the U.S. Navy, and daughter of former Ambassador Kenton Keith
- Reginald Luster, attorney
- Patrick Murphy, U.S. representative

==== Withdrawn ====
- Lateresa Jones, life coach and independent candidate for lieutenant governor in 2014 (running as an Independent)

==== Declined ====
- Bob Buckhorn, mayor of Tampa
- Kathy Castor, U.S. representative
- Charlie Crist, former Republican governor of Florida, independent candidate for the U.S. Senate in 2010 and Democratic nominee for governor in 2014 (running for the U.S. House of Representatives)
- Ted Deutch, U.S. representative (running for re-election)
- Buddy Dyer, mayor of Orlando
- Dan Gelber, former minority leader of the Florida House of Representatives, former state senator and nominee for Florida attorney general in 2010
- Andrew Gillum, mayor of Tallahassee
- Philip Levine, mayor of Miami Beach
- Debbie Wasserman Schultz, U.S. representative and former chair of the Democratic National Committee (running for re-election)

=== Endorsements ===
Alan Grayson

Politicians

- Dennis Kucinich, former U.S. representative from Ohio's 10th District and presidential candidate in 2004 & 2008

Individuals

- Jane Kleeb, executive director of BOLD Nebraska
- Carl Pope, former executive director of Sierra Club

Labor unions

- CWA – Communications Workers of America

Organizations

- People for the American Way
- Progressive Democrats of America Florida Chapter
Pam Keith

Newspaper editorial boards

- Miami Herald
Patrick Murphy

Presidents

- Barack Obama, 44th president of the United States

Vice presidents

- Joe Biden, 47th vice president of the United States

U.S. cabinet members and cabinet-level officials

- Hillary Clinton, 67th United States secretary of state, 2008 presidential candidate and 2016 presidential nominee

U.S. senators

- Cory Booker, New Jersey
- Sherrod Brown, Ohio
- Bob Casey, Pennsylvania
- Al Franken, Minnesota
- Bob Graham, Florida (former United States senator; and former governor of Florida)
- Martin Heinrich, New Mexico
- Tim Kaine, Virginia
- Amy Klobuchar, Minnesota
- Claire McCaskill, Missouri
- Chris Murphy, Connecticut
- Bill Nelson, Florida
- Harry Reid, Nevada
- Brian Schatz, Hawaii
- Chuck Schumer, New York
- Jon Tester, Montana
- Sheldon Whitehouse, Rhode Island

U.S. representatives

- Pete Aguilar, California
- Joyce Beatty, Ohio
- Don Beyer, Virginia
- John Carney, Delaware
- Andre Carson, Indiana
- David Cicilline, Rhode Island
- Katherine Clark, Massachusetts
- Bonnie Watson Coleman, New Jersey
- Gerry Connolly, Virginia
- Joe Crowley, New York
- John Delaney, Maryland
- Ted Deutch, Florida
- Elizabeth Esty, Connecticut
- Barney Frank, Massachusetts (former)
- Lois Frankel, Florida
- Marcia Fudge, Ohio
- Tulsi Gabbard, Hawaii
- Michelle Lujan Grisham, New Mexico
- Janice Hahn, California
- Alcee Hastings, Florida
- Denny Heck, Washington
- Jim Himes, Connecticut
- Jared Huffman, California
- Steve Israel, New York
- Bill Keating, Massachusetts
- Dan Kildee, Michigan
- Derek Kilmer, Washington
- Annie Kuster, New Hampshire
- Carolyn Maloney, New York
- Sean Patrick Maloney, New York
- Jerry McNerney, California
- Grace Meng, New York
- Seth Moulton, Massachusetts
- Beto O'Rourke, Texas
- Bill Pascrell, New Jersey
- Donald Payne, Jr., New Jersey
- Ed Perlmutter, Colorado
- Scott Peters, California
- Kathleen Rice, New York
- Cedric Richmond, Louisiana
- Raul Ruiz, California
- Jan Schakowsky, Illinois
- Terri Sewell, Alabama
- Kyrsten Sinema, Arizona
- Jackie Speier, California
- Eric Swalwell, California
- Mark Takano, California
- Juan Vargas, California
- Marc Veasey, Texas
- Filemon Vela, Texas
- Frederica Wilson, Florida

Statewide officials

- Charlie Crist, former Republican governor of Florida, Independent candidate for U.S. Senate in 2010 and Democratic nominee for governor in 2014
- Nan Rich, former state senator and Democratic candidate for governor in 2014
- Alex Sink, former chief financial officer of Florida, nominee for governor in 2010 and nominee for Florida's 13th congressional district in 2014

State legislators

- Joseph Abruzzo, state senator (D-Wellington)
- Bruce Antone, state representative (D-Orlando)
- Lori Berman, state representative (D-Lantana)
- Jeff Clemens, state senator (D-Lake Worth)
- Janet Cruz, state representative (D-Tampa)
- Dwight Dudley, state representative (D-St. Petersburg)
- Katie Edwards, state representative (D-Plantation)
- Reggie Fullwood, state representative (D-Jacksonville)
- Joe Geller, state representative (D-Aventura)
- Audrey Gibson, state senator (D-Jacksonville)
- Kristin Jacobs, state representative (D-Pompano Beach)
- Evan Jenne, state representative (D-Hollywood)
- Mia Jones, state representative (D-Tallahassee)
- Shevrin Jones, state representative (D-West Park)
- Dave Kerner, state representative (D-Lake Worth)
- Larry Lee Jr., state representative (D-Port St. Lucie)
- Gwen Margolis, state senator (D-Miami Beach)
- Jared Moskowitz, state representative (D-Coral Springs)
- Amanda Murphy, state representative (D-New Port Richey)
- Ed Narain, state representative (D-Tampa)
- Bobby Powell, state representative (D-Riviera Beach)
- Kevin Rader, state representative (D-Delray Beach)
- Jeremy Ring, state senator (D-Parkland)
- José Javier Rodríguez, state representative (D-Miami)
- Irving Slosberg, state representative (D-Boca Raton)
- Chris Smith, state senator (D-Fort Lauderdale)
- Eleanor Sobel, state senator (D-Hollywood)
- Cynthia Stafford, state representative (D-Miami)
- Rick Stark, state representative (D-Weston)
- Dwayne Taylor, state representative (D-Daytona Beach)
- Alan Williams, state representative (D-Tallahassee)

Mayors and other municipal leaders

- Burt Aaronson, former Palm Beach County commissioner
- Peggy Bell, mayor of Cutler Bay
- Diane Veltri Bendekovic, mayor of Plantation
- Mark Bogen, Broward County commissioner
- Bob Buckhorn, mayor of Tampa
- Skip Campbell, mayor of Coral Springs
- William Capote, mayor of Palm Bay
- Joyce Cusack, Volusia County councilwoman
- Harry Dressler, mayor of Tamarac
- Beam Furr, Broward County commissioner
- Andrew Gillum, mayor of Tallahassee
- Cary Glickstein, mayor of Delray Beach
- Derrick Henry, mayor of Daytona Beach
- Dale Holness, Broward County commissioner
- Scott Israel, Broward County sheriff
- Eric Jablin, mayor of Palm Beach Gardens
- Richard Kaplan, mayor of Lauderhill
- Marty Kiar, Broward County commissioner
- Rick Kriseman, mayor of St. Petersburg
- Bob Margolis, mayor of Wellington
- Wayne Messam, mayor of Miramar
- Jeri Muoio, mayor of West Palm Beach
- Ben Nelson, Jr., mayor of Bonita Springs
- Frank Ortis, mayor of Pembroke Pines
- Lori Parrish, Broward County property appraiser
- Michael Ryan, mayor of Sunrise
- Tim Ryan, mayor of Broward County
- Jack Seiler, mayor of Fort Lauderdale
- Becky Tooley, mayor of Coconut Creek
- Shelley Vana, mayor of Palm Beach County and former state representative

Labor unions

- AFGE – American Federation of Government Employees
- AFSCME – American Federation of State, County and Municipal Employees
- IAM – International Association of Machinists and Aerospace Workers
- IBT – International Brotherhood of Teamsters
- International Association of Bridge, Structural, Ornamental and Reinforcing Iron Workers
- LIUNA – Laborers' International Union of North America
- SEIU – Service Employees International Union
- UBC – United Brotherhood of Carpenters and Joiners of America

Organizations

- Congressional Black Caucus
- Democratic Senatorial Campaign Committee
- End Citizens United
- Florida Alliance for Retired Americans
- League of Conservation Voters
- NARAL Pro-Choice America
- Planned Parenthood

Newspaper editorial boards

- Orlando Sentinel
- Sun-Sentinel

=== Polling ===
Poll source	Date(s) administered	Sample size	Margin of error	Alan Grayson	Pam Keith	Lateresa Jones	Patrick Murphy	Other/ Undecided
Mason-Dixon	August 22–24, 2016	400	± 5%	22%	4%	—	55%	19%
Florida Atlantic University	August 19–22, 2016	364		8%	7%	—	54%	22%
Florida Chamber of Commerce	August 17–22, 2016	258	± 4.0%	11%	—	—	40%	38%
St. Leo University	August 14–18, 2016	532	± 4.5%	17%	8%	—	48%	27%
Suffolk University	August 1–3, 2016	194	± 4.4%	17%	2%	–	36%	45%
St. Pete Polls	August 2, 2016	1,807	± 2.3%	20%	7%	–	45%	28%
Bay News 9/SurveyUSA	June 25–27, 2016	618	± 4.0%	21%	10%	–	30%	35%
Vox Populi Polling (R)	June 19–20, 2016	530	± 4.3%	15%	5%	–	19%	62%
Targeted Persuasion	June 14–16, 2016	862	± 3.34%	30%	5%	–	27%	38%
St. Leo University	June 10–16, 2016	500	± 7%	14%	3%	4%	16%	61%
Mason-Dixon	May 31–June 2, 2016	400	± 5%	23%	3%	–	31%	43%
Public Policy Polling	March 22–23, 2016	829	?	33%	–	–	32%	35%
St. Leo University	March 13–17, 2016	540	± 5%	17%	–	–	20%	63%
Mason-Dixon	March 7–9, 2016	500	± 4.5%	19%	–	–	33%	48%
SurveyUSA	March 4–6, 2016	592	± 4.1%	16%	11%	–	27%	46%
Bendixon & Amandi/The Tarrance Group	March 2–5, 2016	449	± 6%	19%	–	–	27%	54%
Univision	March 2–5, 2016	449	± 6%	29%	–	–	36%	35%
Public Policy Polling	February 24–25, 2016	388	± 5%	33%	–	–	22%	45%
20/20 Insight LLC*	~February 16–18, 2016	646	± 3.9%	41%	–	–	32%	27%
Florida Atlantic University College of Business	January 15–18, 2016	371	± 5%	27%	–	–	20%	53%
St. Leo University	November 29–December 3, 2015	160	± 7.5%	7%	4%	6%	17%	55%
Public Policy Polling	September 11–13, 2015	368	± 5.1%	33%	–	–	27%	39%
Mason-Dixon	July 20–24, 2015	500	± 4.5%	24%	–	–	26%	50%
Mason-Dixon	July 20–24, 2015	500	± 4.5%	33%	–	–	32%	35%
St. Pete Polls	July 15, 2015	1,018	± 3.1%	30%	8%	–	23%	39%
Gravis Marketing	June 16–20, 2015	881	± 3.3%	63%	–	–	19%	18%
Vox Populi Polling (R)	June 15–17, 2015	717	± 3.7%	24%	–	–	34%	42%
St. Leo University	May 25–31, 2015	535	± 4.5%	24%	—	–	27%	49%
Mason-Dixon	April 14–16, 2015	400	± 5%	14%	–	–	23%	63%
Public Policy Polling	March 19–22, 2015	371	± 5.1%	22%	–	–	21%	56%

* Internal poll for Alan Grayson

=== Results ===
County results

Democratic primary results
Party	Candidate	Votes	%
Democratic	Patrick Murphy	665,985	58.92%
Democratic	Alan Grayson	199,929	17.72%
Democratic	Pam Keith	173,919	15.40%
Democratic	Rocky De La Fuente	60,810	5.38%
Democratic	Reginald Luster	29,138	2.58%
Total votes		1,129,781	100.00%

== Libertarian primary ==
On October 1, 2015, Adrian Wyllie and Lynn House, chair and vice chair, respectively, of the Libertarian Party of Florida, resigned their seats in protest after the executive committee refused to oust candidate Augustus Invictus from the party. According to Wyllie, Invictus had defended eugenics, called for a new civil war, and brutally slaughtered a goat, and is not representative of the Libertarian Party. Invictus has refuted these claims, calling Wyllie's accusations "deliberate misrepresentation[s]."

=== Candidates ===
==== Declared ====
- Augustus S. Invictus, attorney
- Paul Stanton, IT technician and U.S. Army veteran

==== Declined ====
- Roger Stone, political consultant, lobbyist and strategist

=== Endorsements ===
Paul Stanton

Individuals

- Will Coley, activist, radio host, and former vice presidential candidate
- Marc Allan Feldman, physician and former presidential candidate
- Jim Gray, author, former judge and Libertarian vice presidential nominee in 2012
- Thomas Knapp, writer, founder of the Boston Tea Party (political party), and former Reform Party vice presidential candidate
- Gary Johnson, former governor of New Mexico and Libertarian nominee for president in 2016
- John McAfee, CEO of MGT Capital Investments Inc, founder of McAfee Inc and former presidential candidate
- Kevin McCormick, former presidential candidate
- Richard Molek, chair of the Libertarian Party of Lee County
- Darryl W. Perry, activist, author, radio host, lobbyist, former presidential candidate and former chairman of the Boston Tea Party (political party)
- William Weld, former governor of Massachusetts and Libertarian nominee for vice president in 2016

Libertarian Party of Florida affiliates

- Libertarian Party of Broward County
- Libertarian Party of Collier County
- Libertarian Party of Palm Beach County
- Libertarian Party of Pinellas County
- Libertarian Party of Santa Rosa County
- Libertarian Party of Volusia County
- Northwest Florida Libertarian Party

Organizations

- Eastern Liberty Alliance PAC
- Ninjas for Liberty PAC
Augustus Sol Invictus

Individuals

- Keon A. Grayson, North Central, Miami-Dade County Community councilman
- Steve Scheetz, former chair of the Pennsylvania Libertarian Party
- Bill Wohlsifer, former candidate for Florida attorney general

=== Results ===
2016 United States Senate Libertarian primary in Florida by county Map legend: Stanton—50–60%; Stanton—60–70%; Stanton—70–80%; Stanton—80–90%; Stanton—>90%; Invictus—50–60%; Tie—50%; No votes

Libertarian primary results
Party	Candidate	Votes	%
Libertarian	Paul Stanton	2,946	73.48%
Libertarian	Augustus Sol Invictus	1,063	26.52%
Total votes		4,009	100.00%

== Independent ==
=== Candidates ===
==== Declared ====
- Basil Dalack, attorney and former Tequesta village councilman
- Lateresa Jones, life coach and candidate for lieutenant governor in 2014
- Anton "Tony" Khoury, businessman
- Steven Machat, music producer
- Bruce Nathan, physical therapist

== No party affiliation ==
=== Candidates ===
Declared

- Bruce Nathan, physical therapist

== General election ==
=== Debates ===
Dates	Location	Rubio	Murphy	Stanton	Link
October 17, 2016	Orlando, Florida	Participant	Participant	Not Invited	
October 26, 2016	Davie, Florida	Participant	Participant	Not Invited	

=== Predictions ===
Source	Ranking	As of
The Cook Political Report	Lean R	November 2, 2016
Sabato's Crystal Ball	Lean R	November 7, 2016
Rothenberg Political Report	Lean R	November 3, 2016
Daily Kos	Lean R	November 8, 2016
Real Clear Politics	Tossup	November 7, 2016

=== Polling ===
View source data.

Poll source	Date(s) administered	Sample size	Margin of error	Marco Rubio (R)	Patrick Murphy (D)	Paul Stanton (L)	Other	Undecided
SurveyMonkey	November 1–7, 2016	4,092	± 4.6%	48%	49%	—	—	3%
Quinnipiac University	November 3–6, 2016	884	± 3.3%	50%	43%	—	2%	5%
Alliance/ESA Poll	November 2–6, 2016	875	± 4.2%	51%	40%	—	—	9%
SurveyMonkey	October 31–November 6, 2016	3,574	± 4.6%	48%	49%	—	—	3%
CBS News/YouGov	November 2–4, 2016	1,188	± 3.6%	47%	44%	—	3%	6%
SurveyMonkey	October 28–November 3, 2016	3,356	± 4.6%	49%	49%	—	—	2%
Breitbart/Gravis Marketing	November 1–2, 2016	1,220	± 2.8%	47%	46%	—	—	7%
FOX 13 Tampa Bay/Opinion Savvy	November 1–2, 2016	603	± 4.0%	50%	46%	—	—	4%
SurveyMonkey	October 27–November 2, 2016	2,901	± 4.6%	49%	48%	—	—	3%
CNN/ORC	October 27–November 1, 2016	773 LV	± 3.5%	49%	48%	—	—	2%
CNN/ORC	October 27–November 1, 2016	884 RV	± 3.5%	50%	47%	—	—	3%
Quinnipiac University	October 27–November 1, 2016	626	± 3.9%	50%	44%	—	1%	4%
SurveyMonkey	October 26–November 1, 2016	2,715	± 4.6%	49%	47%	—	—	4%
SurveyMonkey	October 25–31, 2016	2,809	± 4.6%	49%	47%	—	—	4%
TargetSmart/William & Mary	October 25–28, 2016	718	± 3.4%	49%	43%	—	7%	1%
Emerson College	October 26–27, 2016	500	± 4.3%	49%	47%	—	3%	1%
New York Times Upshot/Siena College	October 25–27, 2016	814	± 3.4%	51%	42%	—	—	5%
Breitbart/Gravis Marketing	October 25–26, 2016	1,301	± 2.7%	46%	46%	—	—	8%
Public Policy Polling	October 25–26, 2016	742	± 3.6%	46%	46%	—	—	8%
NBC/WSJ/Marist	October 25–26, 2016	779 LV	± 3.5%	51%	43%	—	4%	2%
NBC/WSJ/Marist	October 25–26, 2016	990 RV	± 3.1%	50%	42%	—	4%	3%
St. Leo University	October 22–26, 2016	1,028	± 3.0%	44%	39%	—	—	17%
University of North Florida	October 20–25, 2016	836	± 3.6%	49%	43%	—	—	8%
Bloomberg/Selzer	October 21–24, 2016	953	± 3.2%	51%	41%	—	—	8%
Florida Atlantic University	October 21–23, 2016	500	± 4.3%	46%	42%	—	—	12%
Bay News 9/SurveyUSA	October 20–24, 2016	1,251	± 2.8%	45%	41%	—	6%	8%
CBS News/YouGov	October 20–21, 2016	1,042	± 3.6%	44%	42%	—	6%	8%
FOX 13 Tampa Bay/Opinion Savvy	October 20, 2016	538	± 4.2%	46%	46%	—	—	8%
Google Consumer Surveys	October 18–20, 2016	500	± 4.2%	57%	38%	—	—	5%
Associated Industries of Florida	October 19, 2016	1,000	± 3.1%	43%	38%	—	8%	11%
Florida Chamber of Commerce	October 16–19, 2016	507	± 4.4%	51%	37%	—	1%	11%
The Times-Picayune/Lucid	October 17–18, 2016	892	± 3.0%	45%	44%	—	—	11%
Quinnipiac University	October 10–16, 2016	660	± 3.8%	49%	47%	—	—	4%
Washington Post/SurveyMonkey	October 8–16, 2016	1,702	± 0.5%	51%	45%	—	—	4%
Public Policy Polling	October 12–13, 2016	985	± 3.1%	44%	38%	6%	—	12%
Public Policy Polling	October 12–13, 2016	985	± 3.1%	48%	43%	—	—	9%
Breitbart/Gravis Marketing	October 11–13, 2016	1,799	± 2.3%	44%	36%	—	—	20%
FOX 13 Tampa Bay/Opinion Savvy	October 10–11, 2016	533	± 4.2%	48%	44%	—	—	8%
NBC/WSJ/Marist	October 3–5, 2016	700	± 3.7%	48%	46%	—	2%	4%
Associated Industries of Florida	October 2–5, 2016	600	± 4.0%	49%	41%	—	1%	9%
Breitbart/Gravis Marketing	October 4, 2016	821	± 3.4%	44%	40%	—	—	16%
Emerson College	October 2–4, 2016	600	± 3.6%	47%	39%	—	6%	8%
University of North Florida	September 27–October 4, 2016	667	± 3.8%	48%	41%	—	1%	10%
Quinnipiac University	September 27–October 2, 2016	545	± 4.2%	48%	44%	—	—	8%
FOX 13 Tampa Bay/Opinion Savvy	September 28–29, 2016	619	± 4.0%	47%	43%	—	—	10%
Mason-Dixon	September 27–29, 2016	820	± 3.5%	47%	40%	5%	2%	6%
Public Policy Polling	September 27–28, 2016	826	± 3.4%	42%	35%	9%	—	15%
Public Policy Polling	September 27–28, 2016	826	± 3.4%	47%	44%	—	—	9%
Suffolk University	September 19–21, 2016	500	± 4.4%	43%	34%	2%	4%	17%
Florida Chamber of Commerce	September 15–20, 2016	617	± 4.0%	46%	42%	—	—	11%
Monmouth University	September 16–19, 2016	400	± 4.9%	47%	45%	—	3%	5%
Saint Leo University	September 10–16, 2016	502	± 4.5%	44%	35%	—	—	21%
New York Times Upshot/Siena College	September 10–14, 2016	867	± 3.3%	48%	42%	—	—	8%
CNN/ORC	September 7–12, 2016	788 LV	± 3.0%	54%	43%	—	1%	2%
CNN/ORC	September 7–12, 2016	886 RV	± 3.0%	51%	45%	—	1%	4%
Global Strategy Group	September 6–11, 2016	800	± 3.5%	47%	45%	—	—	8%
JMC Analytics (R)	September 7–8, 2016	781	± 3.5%	43%	38%	—	4%	15%
Quinnipiac University	August 31–September 7, 2016	601	± 4.0%	50%	43%	—	1%	6%
Public Policy Polling	September 4–6, 2016	744	± 3.6%	40%	37%	10%	—	13%
Mason-Dixon	August 22–24, 2016	625	± 4.0%	46%	43%	—	—	11%
iCitizen	August 18–24, 2016	600	± 4.0%	43%	42%	—	—	16%
Florida Atlantic University	August 19–22, 2016	1,200	± 2.7%	44%	39%	—	—	17%
St. Leo University	August 14–18, 2016	1,380	± 3.0%	46%	38%	—	—	16%
Monmouth University	August 12–15, 2016	402	± 4.9%	48%	43%	—	3%	5%
FOX 13 Tampa Bay/Opinion Savvy	August 10, 2016	622	± 4.0%	45%	43%	—	—	12%
Civis Analytics	August 9–15, 2016	1,436	± 2.8%	44%	45%	—	—	9%
NBC/WSJ/Marist	August 4–10, 2016	862	± 3.3%	49%	43%	—	3%	5%
Public Policy Polling	August 5–7, 2016	938	± 3.2%	42%	40%	—	—	18%
Quinnipiac University	July 30–August 7, 2016	1,056	± 3.0%	48%	45%	—	—	7%
Suffolk University	August 1–3, 2016	500	± 4.4%	46%	33%	—	—	21%
JMC Analytics (R)	July 9–10, 2016	700	± 3.7%	40%	33%	—	5%	21%
NBC/WSJ/Marist	July 5–11, 2016	871	± 3.3%	47%	44%	—	2%	7%
Quinnipiac University	June 30–July 11, 2016	1,015	± 3.1%	50%	37%	—	1%	8%
Bay News 9/SurveyUSA	June 25–27, 2016	1,678	± 2.4%	43%	43%	—	7%	8%
Quinnipiac University	June 8–19, 2016	975	± 3.1%	47%	40%	—	—	13%
Public Policy Polling	June 15–16, 2016	508	± 4.4%	41%	42%	—	—	17%
Public Policy Polling	June 2–5, 2016	737	± 3.6%	43%	44%	—	—	13%
Associated Industries of Florida	April 25–27, 2016	604	± 5.0%	49%	41%	—	—	10%
Public Policy Polling	September 11–13, 2015	814	± 3.4%	46%	40%	—	—	14%
Public Policy Polling	March 19–22, 2015	923	± 3.2%	48%	41%	—	—	11%
Mason-Dixon	March 3–5, 2015	800	± 3.5%	50%	38%	—	—	12%
Public Policy Polling	September 4–7, 2014	818	± 3.4%	46%	41%	—	—	12%

Hypothetical polling

with Ron DeSantis

Poll source	Date(s) administered	Sample size	Margin of error	Ron DeSantis (R)	Alan Grayson (D)	Other	Undecided
Quinnipiac University	June 8–19, 2016	975	± 3.1%	33%	41%	1%	24%
Quinnipiac University	April 27–May 8, 2016	1,051	± 3.0%	38%	36%	—	26%
Public Policy Polling	February 24–25, 2016	1,012	± 3.1%	34%	40%	—	26%
Quinnipiac University	September 25-October 5, 2015	1,173	± 2.9%	31%	37%	1%	26%
Public Policy Polling	September 11–13, 2015	814	± 3.4%	37%	36%	—	28%
Quinnipiac University	June 4–15, 2015	1,147	± 2.9%	32%	38%	1%	29%

Poll source	Date(s) administered	Sample size	Margin of error	Ron DeSantis (R)	Patrick Murphy (D)	Other	Undecided
Quinnipiac University	June 8–19, 2016	975	± 3.1%	32%	42%	1%	25%
Quinnipiac University	April 27–May 8, 2016	1,051	± 3.0%	35%	36%	—	29%
Associated Industries of Florida	April 25–27, 2016	604	± 5%	28%	40%	—	32%
Public Policy Polling	February 24–25, 2016	1,012	± 3.1%	31%	43%	—	26%
Quinnipiac University	September 25-October 5, 2015	1,173	± 2.9%	30%	37%	1%	29%
Public Policy Polling	September 11–13, 2015	814	± 3.4%	35%	40%	—	25%
Quinnipiac University	June 4–15, 2015	1,147	± 2.9%	31%	39%	1%	29%
St. Leo University	May 25–31, 2015	535	± 4.5%	14%	33%	—	53%

with David Jolly

Poll source	Date(s) administered	Sample size	Margin of error	David Jolly (R)	Alan Grayson (D)	Other	Undecided
Quinnipiac University	June 8–19, 2016	975	± 3.1%	34%	41%	1%	24%
Public Policy Polling	June 2–5, 2016	737	± 3.6%	33%	40%	—	27%
Quinnipiac University	April 27–May 8, 2016	1,051	± 3.0%	37%	35%	—	28%
Public Policy Polling	February 24–25, 2016	1,012	± 3.1%	38%	35%	—	26%
Public Policy Polling	September 11–13, 2015	814	± 3.4%	39%	36%	—	26%

Poll source	Date(s) administered	Sample size	Margin of error	David Jolly (R)	Patrick Murphy (D)	Other	Undecided
Quinnipiac University	June 8–19, 2016	975	± 3.1%	34%	41%	1%	25%
Public Policy Polling	June 2–5, 2016	737	± 3.6%	29%	44%	—	27%
Quinnipiac University	April 27–May 8, 2016	1,051	± 3.0%	34%	37%	—	29%
Associated Industries of Florida	April 25–27, 2016	604	± 5%	33%	40%	—	27%
Public Policy Polling	February 24–25, 2016	1,012	± 3.1%	34%	38%	—	27%
Democracy Corps	October 24–28, 2015	400	± 4.9%	44%	43%	—	13%
Public Policy Polling	September 11–13, 2015	814	± 3.4%	35%	40%	—	25%
St. Leo University	May 25–31, 2015	535	± 4.5%	14%	35%	—	52%

with Carlos Lopez-Cantera

Poll source	Date(s) administered	Sample size	Margin of error	Carlos López-Cantera (R)	Alan Grayson (D)	Other	Undecided
Quinnipiac University	June 8–19, 2016	975	± 3.1%	35%	40%	1%	24%
Quinnipiac University	April 27–May 8, 2016	1,051	± 3.0%	37%	37%	—	26%
Public Policy Polling	February 24–25, 2016	1,012	± 3.1%	35%	38%	—	26%
Quinnipiac University	September 25-October 5, 2015	1,173	± 2.9%	32%	35%	1%	27%
Public Policy Polling	September 11–13, 2015	814	± 3.4%	34%	41%	—	24%
Quinnipiac University	June 4–15, 2015	1,147	± 2.9%	31%	37%	1%	31%
Quinnipiac University	March 17–28, 2015	1,087	± 3%	33%	32%	1%	34%
Public Policy Polling	March 19–22, 2015	923	± 3.2%	36%	40%	—	24%

Poll source	Date(s) administered	Sample size	Margin of error	Carlos López-Cantera (R)	Patrick Murphy (D)	Other	Undecided
Quinnipiac University	June 8–19, 2016	975	± 3.1%	32%	41%	1%	26%
Quinnipiac University	April 27–May 8, 2016	1,051	± 3.0%	34%	38%	—	28%
Associated Industries of Florida	April 25–27, 2016	604	± 5%	31%	42%	—	27%
Public Policy Polling	February 24–25, 2016	1,012	± 3.1%	31%	40%	—	29%
Quinnipiac University	September 25-October 5, 2015	1,173	± 2.9%	29%	37%	1%	30%
Public Policy Polling	September 11–13, 2015	814	± 3.4%	35%	41%	—	24%
Quinnipiac University	June 4–15, 2015	1,147	± 2.9%	28%	40%	1%	32%
St. Leo University	May 25–31, 2015	535	± 4.5%	15%	30%	—	56%
Quinnipiac University	March 17–28, 2015	1,087	± 3%	31%	35%	1%	33%
Public Policy Polling	March 19–22, 2015	923	± 3.2%	34%	41%	—	25%

with Jeff Atwater

Poll source	Date(s) administered	Sample size	Margin of error	Jeff Atwater (R)	Alan Grayson (D)	Other	Undecided
Quinnipiac University	March 17–28, 2015	1,087	± 3%	42%	32%	1%	25%
Public Policy Polling	March 19–22, 2015	923	± 3.2%	41%	40%	—	19%

Poll source	Date(s) administered	Sample size	Margin of error	Jeff Atwater (R)	Patrick Murphy (D)	Other	Undecided
Quinnipiac University	March 17–28, 2015	1,087	± 3%	38%	34%	1%	27%
Public Policy Polling	March 19–22, 2015	923	± 3.2%	41%	39%	—	20%
Mason-Dixon	March 3–5, 2015	800	± 3.5%	46%	32%	—	22%

Poll source	Date(s) administered	Sample size	Margin of error	Jeff Atwater (R)	Debbie Wasserman Schultz (D)	Undecided
Mason-Dixon	March 3–5, 2015	800	± 3.5%	45%	35%	20%

with Pam Bondi

Poll source	Date(s) administered	Sample size	Margin of error	Pam Bondi (R)	Alan Grayson (D)	Undecided
Public Policy Polling	March 19–22, 2015	923	± 3.2%	45%	42%	13%

Poll source	Date(s) administered	Sample size	Margin of error	Pam Bondi (R)	Patrick Murphy (D)	Undecided
Public Policy Polling	March 19–22, 2015	923	± 3.2%	45%	41%	14%

with Don Gaetz

Poll source	Date(s) administered	Sample size	Margin of error	Don Gaetz (R)	Patrick Murphy (D)	Undecided
St. Leo University	May 25–31, 2015	535	± 4.5%	9%	36%	55%

with Jeff Miller

Poll source	Date(s) administered	Sample size	Margin of error	Jeff Miller (R)	Patrick Murphy (D)	Undecided
St. Leo University	May 25–31, 2015	535	± 4.5%	15%	34%	52%

with Marco Rubio

Poll source	Date(s) administered	Sample size	Margin of error	Marco Rubio (R)	Alex Sink (D)	Undecided
Public Policy Polling	September 27–29, 2013	579	± 4.1%	45%	42%	13%

Poll source	Date(s) administered	Sample size	Margin of error	Marco Rubio (R)	Debbie Wasserman Schultz (D)	Undecided
Mason-Dixon	March 3–5, 2015	800	± 3.5%	53%	36%	11%
Public Policy Polling	September 4–7, 2014	818	± 3.4%	47%	43%	9%
Public Policy Polling	June 6–9, 2014	672	± 3.8%	48%	40%	12%
Public Policy Polling	September 27–29, 2013	579	± 4.1%	46%	43%	11%

with Allen West

Poll source	Date(s) administered	Sample size	Margin of error	Allen West (R)	Alan Grayson (D)	Undecided
Public Policy Polling	March 19–22, 2015	923	± 3.2%	39%	42%	19%

Poll source	Date(s) administered	Sample size	Margin of error	Allen West (R)	Patrick Murphy (D)	Undecided
Public Policy Polling	March 19–22, 2015	923	± 3.2%	39%	41%	20%

Poll source	Date(s) administered	Sample size	Margin of error	Allen West (R)	Alex Sink (D)	Undecided
Public Policy Polling	September 27–29, 2013	579	± 4.1%	38%	44%	18%

Poll source	Date(s) administered	Sample size	Margin of error	Allen West (R)	Debbie Wasserman Schultz (D)	Undecided
Public Policy Polling	June 6–9, 2014	672	± 3.8%	41%	40%	19%
Public Policy Polling	September 27–29, 2013	579	± 4.1%	40%	44%	16%

with Todd Wilcox

Poll source	Date(s) administered	Sample size	Margin of error	Todd Wilcox (R)	Alan Grayson (D)	Other	Undecided
Quinnipiac University	June 8–19, 2016	975	± 3.1%	34%	39%	2%	24%
Quinnipiac University	April 27–May 8, 2016	1,051	± 3.0%	37%	35%	—	28%

Poll source	Date(s) administered	Sample size	Margin of error	Todd Wilcox (R)	Patrick Murphy (D)	Other	Undecided
Quinnipiac University	June 8–19, 2016	975	± 3.1%	31%	41%	1%	26%
Quinnipiac University	April 27–May 8, 2016	1,051	± 3.0%	33%	38%	—	27%

with Carlos Beruff

Poll source	Date(s) administered	Sample size	Margin of error	Carlos Beruff (R)	Alan Grayson (D)	Other	Undecided
Quinnipiac University	July 30–August 7, 2016	1,056	± 3.0%	39%	43%	1%	17%
Quinnipiac University	June 30–July 11, 2016	1,015	± 3.1%	38%	38%	1%	19%
Quinnipiac University	June 8–19, 2016	975	± 3.1%	33%	40%	1%	25%
Public Policy Polling	June 2–5, 2016	737	± 3.6%	32%	41%	—	28%
Quinnipiac University	April 27–May 8, 2016	1,051	± 3.0%	35%	36%	—	29%

Poll source	Date(s) administered	Sample size	Margin of error	Carlos Beruff (R)	Patrick Murphy (D)	Other	Undecided
Quinnipiac University	July 30–August 7, 2016	1,056	± 3.0%	34%	48%	1%	17%
Quinnipiac University	June 30–July 11, 2016	1,015	± 3.1%	34%	40%	1%	19%
Quinnipiac University	June 8–19, 2016	975	± 3.1%	31%	43%	1%	26%
Public Policy Polling	June 2–5, 2016	737	± 3.6%	31%	43%	—	27%
Quinnipiac University	April 27–May 8, 2016	1,051	± 3.0%	32%	38%	—	29%
Associated Industries of Florida	April 25–27, 2016	604	± 5.0%	31%	39%	—	30%

with Alan Grayson

Poll source	Date(s) administered	Sample size	Margin of error	Marco Rubio (R)	Alan Grayson (D)	Other	Undecided
iCitizen	August 18–24, 2016	600	± 4.0%	44%	39%	—	16%
St. Leo University	August 14–18, 2016	1,380	± 3.0%	47%	34%	—	19%
Monmouth University	August 12–15, 2016	402	± 4.9%	50%	39%	5%	6%
Quinnipiac University	July 30–August 7, 2016	1,056	± 3.0%	49%	43%	1%	8%
Suffolk University	August 1–3, 2016	500	± 4.4%	45%	31%	—	24%
JMC Analytics (R)	July 9–10, 2016	700	± 3.7%	41%	33%	4%	22%
Quinnipiac University	June 30–July 11, 2016	1,015	± 3.1%	50%	38%	1%	8%
Quinnipiac University	June 8–19, 2016	975	± 3.1%	50%	38%	1%	11%
Public Policy Polling	June 15–16, 2016	508	± 4.4%	42%	40%	—	17%
Public Policy Polling	June 2–5, 2016	737	± 3.6%	43%	38%	—	19%
Public Policy Polling	September 11–13, 2015	814	± 3.4%	48%	38%	—	14%
Public Policy Polling	March 19–22, 2015	923	± 3.2%	49%	40%	—	11%

=== Results ===
County Flips: Democratic Hold Flip / Republican Hold Flip

United States Senate election in Florida, 2016
Party	Candidate	Votes	%	±%
Republican	Marco Rubio (incumbent)	4,835,191	51.98%	+3.09%
Democratic	Patrick Murphy	4,122,088	44.31%	+24.11%
Libertarian	Paul Stanton	196,956	2.12%	+1.66%
Independent	Bruce Nathan	52,451	0.56%	N/A
Independent	Tony Khoury	45,820	0.49%	N/A
Independent	Steven Machat	26,918	0.29%	N/A
Independent	Basil E. Dalack	22,236	0.24%	N/A
Write-in		160	0.00%	0.00%
Total votes		9,301,820	100.00%	N/A
Republican hold				

==== By county ====
County	Marco Rubio Republican		Patrick Murphy Democratic		Various candidates Other parties		Margin		Total votes cast
County	#	%	#	%	#	%	#	%	Total votes cast
Alachua	54,203	42.6%	69,399	54.5%	3,732	2.9%	-15,196	-11.9%	127,334
Baker	9,901	79.5%	2,135	17.1%	422	3.5%	7,766	62.4%	12,458
Bay	62,906	72.5%	19,971	23.0%	3,836	4.4%	42,935	49.5%	86,713
Bradford	8,720	73.5%	2,694	22.7%	453	3.9%	6,026	50.8%	11,867
Brevard	181,496	58.3%	112,914	36.3%	16,987	5.5%	68,582	22.0%	311,397
Broward	278,766	34.0%	522,932	63.8%	17,384	2.1%	-244,166	-29.8%	819,082
Calhoun	4,331	72.1%	1,275	21.2%	399	6.7%	3,056	50.9%	6,005
Charlotte	60,194	63.3%	30,207	31.8%	4,673	4.9%	29,987	31.5%	95,074
Citrus	48,798	62.4%	24,038	30.7%	5,426	6.9%	24,760	31.7%	78,262
Clay	77,965	74.0%	23,251	22.1%	4,096	3.9%	54,714	51.9%	105,312
Collier	115,719	68.3%	49,470	29.2%	4,175	2.5%	66,249	39.1%	169,364
Columbia	19,924	70.4%	7,361	26.0%	1,016	3.6%	12,563	44.4%	28,301
DeSoto	6,844	64.3%	3,346	31.5%	449	4.3%	3,498	32.8%	10,639
Dixie	5,040	72.2%	1,582	22.7%	357	5.1%	3,458	49.5%	6,979
Duval	241,000	56.3%	171,598	40.1%	15,216	3.6%	69,402	16.2%	427,814
Escambia	94,200	62.2%	51,316	33.9%	5,899	3.9%	42,884	28.3%	151,415
Flagler	32,914	58.1%	21,260	37.5%	2,451	4.3%	11,654	20.6%	56,625
Franklin	3,861	65.4%	1,826	30.9%	221	3.8%	2,035	34.5%	5,908
Gadsden	6,887	31.4%	14,573	66.4%	493	2.2%	-7,686	-35.0%	21,953
Gilchrist	6,303	75.7%	1,675	20.1%	346	4.2%	4,628	55.6%	8,324
Glades	2,927	68.1%	1,196	27.8%	172	4.0%	1,731	40.3%	4,295
Gulf	5,191	72.0%	1,750	24.3%	265	3.7%	3,441	47.7%	7,206
Hamilton	3,050	56.9%	2,106	39.3%	202	3.8%	944	17.6%	5,358
Hardee	5,151	68.7%	2,025	27.0%	318	4.3%	3,126	41.7%	7,494
Hendry	6,683	61.2%	3,892	35.6%	351	3.2%	2,791	25.6%	10,926
Hernando	53,708	58.2%	32,766	35.5%	5,830	6.4%	20,942	22.7%	92,304
Highlands	28,123	62.5%	14,498	32.2%	2,354	5.2%	13,625	30.3%	44,975
Hillsborough	283,871	48.1%	281,122	47.6%	25,560	4.3%	2,749	0.5%	590,553
Holmes	7,039	83.7%	976	11.6%	399	4.8%	6,063	72.1%	8,414
Indian River	48,181	61.0%	28,288	35.8%	2,519	3.3%	19,893	25.2%	78,988
Jackson	13,820	66.2%	6,362	30.5%	680	3.2%	7,458	35.7%	20,862
Jefferson	3,751	49.4%	3,623	47.7%	222	2.8%	128	1.7%	7,596
Lafayette	2,572	76.5%	669	19.9%	120	3.5%	1,903	56.6%	3,361
Lake	100,664	59.9%	59,151	35.2%	8,145	4.8%	41,513	24.7%	167,960
Lee	204,778	63.6%	104,591	32.5%	12,471	3.9%	100,187	31.1%	321,840
Leon	59,958	39.7%	86,641	57.4%	4,472	3.0%	-26,683	-17.7%	151,071
Levy	12,914	67.7%	5,294	27.8%	859	4.5%	7,620	39.9%	19,067
Liberty	2,290	71.4%	748	23.3%	171	5.3%	1,542	48.1%	3,209
Madison	4,584	54.6%	3,564	42.4%	253	3.1%	1,020	12.2%	8,401
Manatee	102,717	58.0%	66,545	37.6%	7,935	4.4%	36,172	20.4%	177,197
Marion	104,400	60.6%	59,537	34.5%	8,386	4.8%	44,863	26.1%	172,323
Martin	49,806	58.2%	33,685	39.4%	2,029	2.4%	16,121	18.8%	85,520
Miami-Dade	420,063	43.3%	529,445	54.6%	20,489	2.1%	-109,382	-11.3%	969,997
Monroe	21,629	51.7%	18,738	44.8%	1,446	3.5%	2,891	6.9%	41,813
Nassau	34,974	75.8%	9,544	20.7%	1,592	3.4%	25,430	55.1%	46,110
Okaloosa	74,749	74.8%	20,813	20.8%	4,430	5.4%	53,936	54.0%	99,992
Okeechobee	8,647	64.1%	4,287	31.8%	557	4.1%	4,360	32.3%	13,491
Orange	224,853	41.7%	293,696	54.4%	21,276	3.9%	-68,843	-24.40%	539,825
Osceola	57,103	41.2%	75,646	54.6%	5,774	4.1%	-18,543	-13.4%	138,523
Palm Beach	287,899	44.1%	350,625	53.7%	14,289	2.2%	-62,726	-9.6%	652,813
Pasco	134,779	56.7%	88,665	37.3%	14,158	6.0%	46,114	19.4%	237,602
Pinellas	236,421	48.8%	222,928	46.0%	24,965	5.2%	13,493	2.8%	484,314
Polk	156,196	55.7%	110,363	39.4%	13,728	4.9%	45,833	16.3%	280,287
Putnam	21,474	65.7%	9,910	30.3%	1,317	4.0%	11,564	35.4%	32,701
St. Johns	95,753	70.6%	35,580	26.2%	4,252	3.2%	60,173	44.4%	135,585
St. Lucie	66,222	47.4%	69,590	49.9%	3,769	2.7%	-3,368	-2.5%	139,581
Santa Rosa	66,921	76.9%	16,284	18.7%	3,818	4.3%	50,637	58.2%	87,023
Sarasota	124,163	55.0%	92,332	40.9%	9,061	4.1%	31,831	14.1%	25,556
Seminole	117,734	53.2%	94,449	42.7%	9,229	4.1%	23,285	10.5%	221,412
Sumter	51,846	68.3%	21,187	27.9%	2,862	3.8%	30,659	40.4%	75,895
Suwannee	13,335	72.1%	4,483	24.2%	685	3.8%	8,852	47.9%	18,503
Taylor	6,216	67.3%	2,658	28.8%	358	3.9%	3,558	38.5%	9,232
Union	4,313	77.4%	1,064	19.1%	198	3.6%	3,249	58.3%	5,575
Volusia	139,933	54.5%	104,531	40.7%	12,213	4.8%	35,402	13.8%	256,677
Wakulla	9,773	64.3%	4,852	31.9%	574	3.8%	4,921	32.4%	15,199
Walton	25,722	77.2%	6,334	19.0%	1,282	3.9%	19,388	58.2%	33,338
Washington	8,323	75.5%	2,232	20.2%	475	4.3%	6,091	55.3%	11,030
Totals	4,835,191	52.0%	4,122,088	44.3%	344,541	3.7%	713,103	7.7%	9,301,820

Counties that flipped from Republican to Democratic

- Miami-Dade (largest municipality: Miami)
- Osceola (largest municipality: Kissimmee)
- St. Lucie (largest municipality: Port St. Lucie)
- Alachua (largest city: Gainesville)
- Orange (largest city: Orlando)

Counties that flipped from Independent to Democratic

- Broward (largest city: Fort Lauderdale)
- Leon (largest city: Tallahassee)
- Palm Beach (largest city: West Palm Beach)

Counties that flipped from Independent to Republican

- Pinellas (largest municipality: St. Petersburg)

==== By congressional district ====
Rubio won 16 of 27 congressional districts, with the remaining 11 going to Murphy. Each candidate won a congressional district that elected a representative of the other party.

District	Rubio	Murphy	Representative
1st	70%	25%	Jeff Miller
1st	70%	25%	Matt Gaetz
2nd	66%	30%	Gwen Graham
2nd	66%	30%	Neal Dunn
3rd	59%	37%	Ted Yoho
4th	68%	28%	Ander Crenshaw
4th	68%	28%	John Rutherford
5th	41%	56%	Corrine Brown
5th	41%	56%	Al Lawson
6th	57%	39%	Ron DeSantis
7th	49%	46%	John Mica
7th	49%	46%	Stephanie Murphy
8th	59%	36%	Bill Posey
9th	46%	50%	Alan Grayson
9th	46%	50%	Darren Soto
10th	40%	56%	Daniel Webster
10th	40%	56%	Val Demings
11th	62%	33%	Rich Nugent
11th	62%	33%	Daniel Webster
12th	56%	38%	Gus Bilirakis
13th	47%	48%	David Jolly
13th	47%	48%	Charlie Crist
14th	44%	52%	Kathy Castor
15th	54%	41%	Dennis Ross
16th	55%	40%	Vern Buchanan
17th	62%	33%	Tom Rooney
18th	52%	45%	Patrick Murphy
18th	52%	45%	Brian Mast
19th	65%	31%	Curt Clawson
19th	65%	31%	Francis Rooney
20th	21%	77%	Alcee Hastings
21st	42%	55%	Lois Frankel
22nd	43%	55%	Ted Deutch
23rd	40%	58%	Debbie Wasserman Schultz
24th	20%	78%	Frederica Wilson
25th	60%	38%	Mario Díaz-Balart
26th	49%	48%	Carlos Curbelo
27th	48.5%	49.3%	Ileana Ros-Lehtinen

== See also ==
- United States Senate elections, 2016
