= Florida's 72nd House of Representatives district =

American legislative district

Florida's 72nd State House of Representatives district
Representative
William Conerly; R–Sarasota
- Registration: 59.6% Republican; 38.5% Democratic; 1.9% No party preference
- Demographics: 72.5% White; 6.2% Black; 15.9% Hispanic; 3.6% Asian; 1.7% Native American
- Population (2020) • Voting age: 176,500; 18

Florida's 72nd House district elects one member of the Florida House of Representatives. Its current representative is Republican William "Bill" Conerly. This district is located in the Sarasota metropolitan area and encompasses northwestern parts of Sarasota County. As of the 2010 census, the district's population is 159,167. The most populated census-designated place in the district is its share of Sarasota, with around 54,400 people living there; followed by Sarasota Springs (16,400 people) and Fruitville (13,300 people).

== Representatives from 1972 to the present ==
Representatives by party affiliation
Party	Representatives
Republican	8
Democratic	5

Name	Term of service	Residence	Political party
Harry H. Pfeiffer	1967-1970	Cocoa Beach	Republican
F. Eugene Tubbs	1970-1972	Rockledge	Republican
John P. Harllee	1972-1974	Bradenton	Democratic
Pat Neal	1974-1978	Bradenton	Democratic
Larry Shackelford	1978-1982	Palmetto	Democratic
Vernon Peeples	1982-1996	Punta Gorda	Democratic
Lindsay Harrington	1996-2004	Punta Gorda	Republican
Paige Kreegel	2004-2012	Punta Gorda	Republican
Ray Pilon	2012-2016	Sarasota	Republican
Alexandra Miller	2016-2018	Sarasota	Republican
Margaret Good	2018-2020	Sarasota	Democratic
Fiona McFarland	2020-2022	Sarasota	Republican
Tommy Gregory	2022- present	Sarasota	Republican
