= Marlene Woodson Howard =

American politician (born 1937)

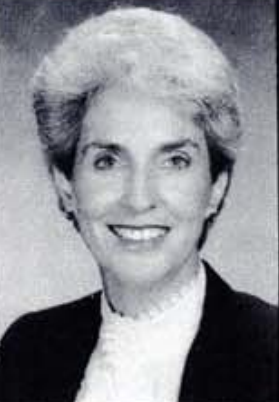

Member of the Florida Senate from the 24th district
- In office November 4, 1986 – November 6, 1990
- Preceded by: Pat Neal
- Succeeded by: John M. McKay

Personal details
- Born: March 8, 1937 (age 89) Ford City, Pennsylvania
- Party: Republican
- Spouse: Francis M. Howard (died 2016)
- Children: 5
- Education: Indiana University of Pennsylvania (B.S.); University of South Florida (M.A.); Nova University (Ed.D.)
- Occupation: Consultant

Marlene Woodson Howard (born March 8, 1937) is a Republican politician from Florida who served as a member of the Florida Senate from the 24th district from 1986 to 1990.

Woodson Howard was elected to the Florida Senate in 1986, narrowly defeating incumbent Democratic State Senator Pat Neal.

In 1990 Florida gubernatorial election, she challenged incumbent Governor Bob Martinez in the Republican primary, running on a ticket with businessman Rip Weiler. She lost the nomination to Martinez by a wide margin, winning 20 percent of the vote to his 69 percent.
