= Harry H. Pfeiffer =

American politician (died 1970)

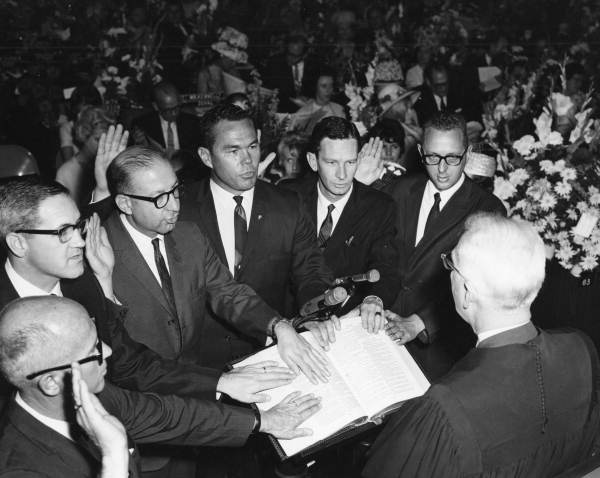
- Pfeiffer with Paul Danahy, Richard Hodes, John R. Culbreath, Tommy Stevens and Charles E. Davis Jr. in 1967

Member of the Florida House of Representatives from the 72nd district
- In office March 1967 – 1970
- Preceded by: District established
- Succeeded by: Richard J. Tillman

Personal details
- Died: October 1970
- Party: Republican
- Spouse: Betty Pfeiffer
- Children: 2

Harry H. Pfeiffer (died October 1970) was an American politician. He served as a Republican member for the 72nd district of the Florida House of Representatives.

Pfeiffer moved to Cocoa Beach, Florida in the 1950s. In 1967, he was elected as a member for the newly established 72nd district of the Florida House of Representatives. In October 1967 he was accused of making false campaign reports but the charges were dismissed the following January. In March 1968 Pfeiffer announced that he would not run for re-election, and he was succeeded by Richard J. Tillman in 1970.

On October 20, 1970, Pfeiffer was found dead in the sea off Cocoa Beach, Florida with an apparently self-inflicted gunshot wound.
