= Vasco Peeples =

American politician

Member of the Florida House of Representatives from Suwannee County
- In office 1929

Personal details
- Born: December 27, 1905 Hamilton County, Florida, U.S.
- Died: April 20, 1985 (aged 79)
- Party: Democratic
- Children: 3; including Vernon Peeples
- Relatives: William L. Peeples (grandfather); Daniel Bell (great-great grandfather)

Vasco Peeples (December 27, 1905 – April 20, 1985) was an American politician. He served as a Democratic member of the Florida House of Representatives.

== Life and career ==
Peeples was born in Hamilton County, Florida.

Peeples served in the Florida House of Representatives in 1929.

Peeples died on April 20, 1985, at the age of 79.
