= William L. Peeples =

American politician

Member of the Florida House of Representatives from Hamilton County
- In office 1885–1887

Personal details
- Born: September 19, 1833
- Died: September 2, 1896 (aged 62)
- Party: Democratic
- Relatives: Vasco Peeples (grandson); Vernon Peeples (great-grandson); Daniel Bell (???)

William L. Peeples (September 19, 1833 – September 2, 1896) was an American politician. He served as a Democratic member of the Florida House of Representatives.
