= Richard Tillman =

Richard Tillman may refer to:

- Richard J. Tillman, member of the Florida House of Representatives
- Dick Tillman, American Olympic sailor
- Richard Tillman, brother of American football player and U.S. Army Ranger Pat Tillman
