= Neal Communities =

Company

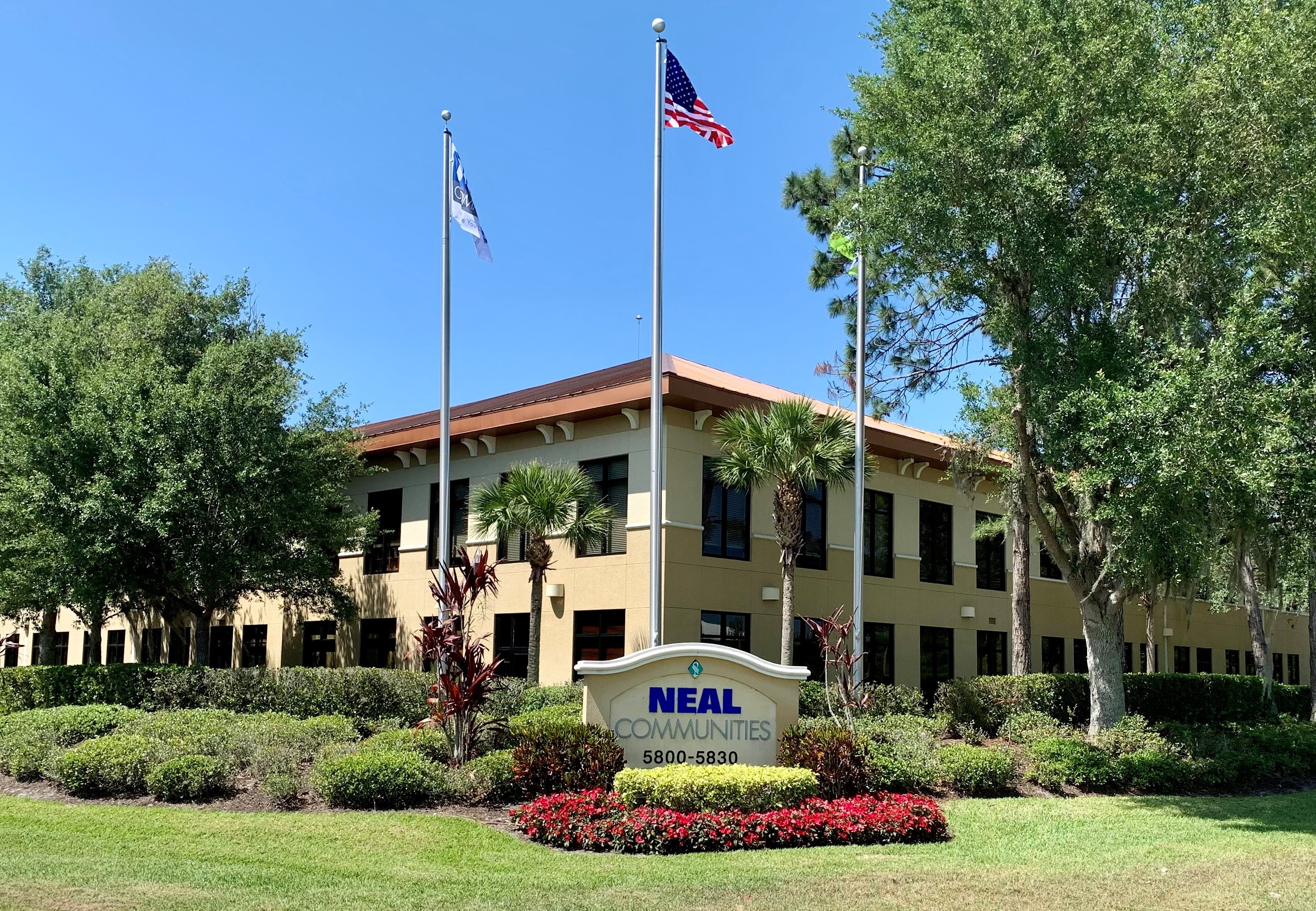
- Neal Communities headquarters in Sarasota, Florida
- Type: Private
- Industry: Land development and home building
- Founded: 1970
- Headquarters: Lakewood Ranch, Florida, United States
- Area served: Southwest Florida
- Key people: Pat Neal
- Website: nealcommunities.com

Neal Communities is a privately held land development and home building company based in Lakewood Ranch, Florida, and founded in 1970.

== History ==
2010 saw Neal Communities expand into Venice with its latest community, Grand Palm.

Neal Communities started development for communities in the Fort Myers/Naples area in 2013.

== Special COVID-19 vaccination access ==
In early 2021 multiple communities built by Neal Communities were selected as the location of special pop-up vaccination clinics. Residents of nearby communities say they were not invited to these special clinics despite only living a few minutes from the communities where the pop-up clinic was being held. A spokesperson for Neal Communities stated "the company was not involved in the Lakewood Ranch vaccination site and said the company would have no further comment." Residents in the Neal Communities' Grand Palm subdivision which is in southern Sarasota County received invitations to Kings Gate (located in Charlotte County), which is a gated neighborhood where Neal Communities was also building homes. Boca Royale was a location of one of these pop-up vaccination sites. In addition to members of the community receiving an invitation to the pop-up vaccination site, emails show members of the country club associated with the community also received invitations to the clinic.
