= 1990 Florida gubernatorial election =

- November 6, 1990
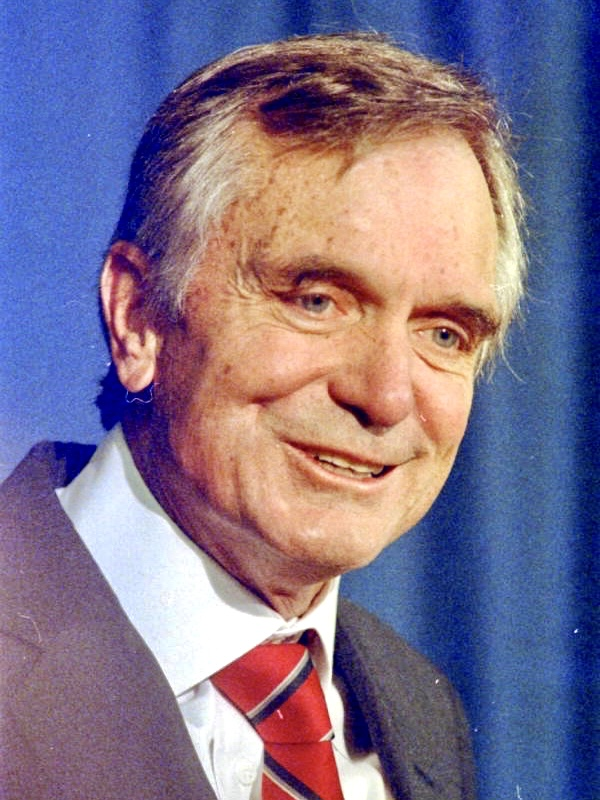

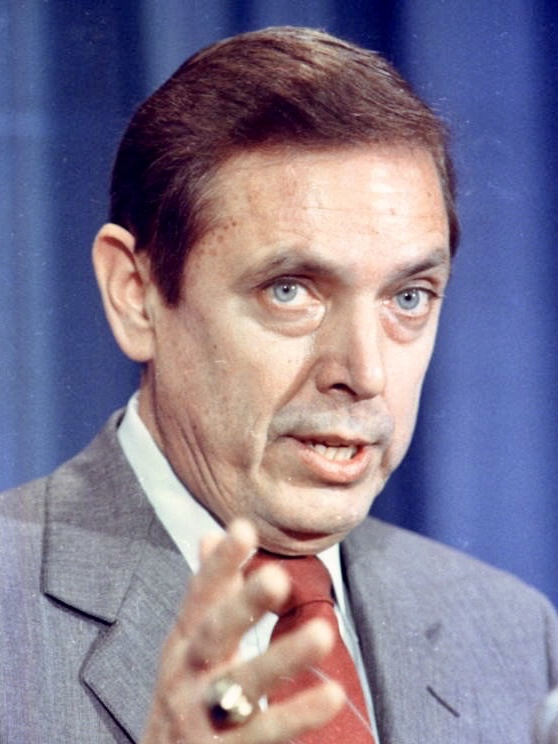
Nominee	Lawton Chiles	Bob Martinez
Party	Democratic	Republican
Running mate	Buddy MacKay	J. Allison DeFoor
Popular vote	1,995,206	1,535,068
Percentage	56.51%	43.49%
- County results Chiles: 50–60% 60–70% 70–80% Martinez: 50–60% 60–70%
Governor before election
Bob Martinez
Republican
Elected Governor
Lawton Chiles
Democratic

The 1990 Florida gubernatorial election took place on November 6, 1990. Incumbent Republican Governor Bob Martinez ran for a second term in office, but was defeated by Democratic challenger Lawton Chiles, a former U.S. senator.

Martinez, who was just the second member of his party elected Governor of Florida after Reconstruction, was deeply unpopular. His job approval rating had sunk to around 24% after, in 1989, he called the Florida Legislature into special session in an effort to pass anti-abortion laws. None of the governor's proposals made it out of committee.

This was the last time that Seminole County voted Democratic in a gubernatorial election until 2018. As of 2026, this remains the last time in which an incumbent Florida Governor lost reelection.

== Republican primary ==
=== Candidates ===
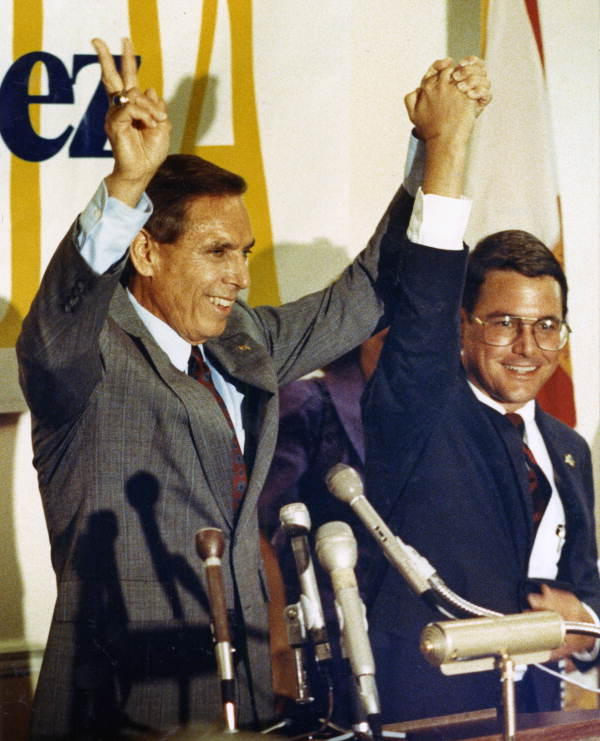
Governor Martinez flashes the V sign with his running mate, Monroe County Sheriff Allison DeFoor, on June 4.

- John Davis, owner of a Largo burial vault company

  - Running mate: Walter D. Murray, retired Army nurse and Davis's longtime family friend

- Warren H. Folks, candidate for State Senate from Jacksonville in 1988

- Running mate: Charles McDonald, owner of an electronic security company in Miami

- Andy Martin, perennial candidate and vexatious litigant

  - Running mate: Barbara Lindsey, candidate for Agriculture Commissioner in 1982

- Bob Martinez, incumbent governor

  - Running mate: J. Allison DeFoor, Sheriff of Monroe County

- Marlene Woodson Howard, state senator from Bradenton and marketing consultant

  - Running mate: Eric "Rip" Weiler, retired Tampa businessman

=== Campaign ===
State Senator Marlene Woodson Howard announced a primary challenge to Governor Martinez during the special legislative session, which she referred to as "hell on wheels." She had been at odds with Martinez since 1987, their first year in office, when Martinez backed a sales tax on services; he eventually withdrew his support after public polling showed a backlash. Though she was critical of Martinez's proposed restrictions on abortion, she did sponsor a proposal to notify parents if their teenage daughters sought an abortion.

Woodson Howard focused her campaign on education and proposed a constitutional amendment to prioritize it in state spending. She had little hope of victory against Martinez, relying on public financing and a personal loan of $30,000, while Martinez promised to raise $12 to 15 million in private contributions. Nevertheless, Woodson Howard cited her upset victory over Senate Appropriations chair Pat Neal in 1986 as evidence for upset potential.

Martinez originally intended to delay his campaign until after the primary, but his popularity declined so precipitously that he launched a series of television ads in February and again in August. As his running mate, he chose Sheriff Allison DeFoor of Key West, who was seen as a drug warrior and environmentalist, emphasizing two key themes of the Martinez campaign.

=== Results ===
Republican Primary by county Martinez: 50–60%; 60–70%; 70–80%; 80–90%

Republican primary results
Party	Candidate	Votes	%
Republican	Bob Martinez (incumbent)	460,718	69.00%
Republican	Marlene Woodson Howard	132,565	19.80%
Republican	John Davis	34,720	5.20%
Republican	Andy Martin	28,591	4.30%
Republican	Warren H. Folks	11,587	1.70%
Total votes		668,181	100.00%

== Democratic primary ==
=== Candidates ===
- Lawton Chiles, former United States senator (1971–89)

- Running mate: Buddy MacKay, former U.S. representative from Ocala and nominee for U.S. Senate in 1988

- Bill Nelson, U.S. representative from Melbourne

- Running mate: Tom Gustafson, Speaker of the Florida House of Representatives

==== Withdrew ====
- George Stuart, state senator from Orlando

==== Declined ====
- Bob Butterworth, Florida Attorney General
- Buddy MacKay, former U.S. representative from Ocala and nominee for U.S. Senate in 1988 (endorsed Chiles; ran for lieutenant governor)

=== Campaign ===
The Democratic primary was a contest between former U.S. senator Lawton Chiles and U.S. Representative Bill Nelson.

Nelson began assembling a campaign shortly after Martinez won the 1986 election. He appeared to be well on his way to the nomination, having raised millions of dollars and without a clear opponent, when former U.S. senator Lawton Chiles announced his campaign on April 12. The popular 60-year-old Chiles, who retired in 1989 after serious health problems, had previously said he would not run. He named as his running mate former U.S. representative Buddy MacKay, who had narrowly lost the race to succeed Chiles in 1988.

Despite advice to bow out, Nelson remained in the race and began a negative campaign against Chiles's record, attacking his business dealings and failure to report certain transactions on Senate disclosure forms. In turn, Nelson was criticized for stretching the truth. Chiles used the slogan "People vs. Money" and focused his counter-attacks on special-interest donations, limiting his own campaign contributions to $100 per donor and skewering Nelson for accepting money from bankers, developers, and lawyers.

Nelson's campaign was buried under criticism when his running mate, retiring Speaker of the House Tom Gustafson, referenced Chiles's clinical depression and use of Prozac, saying, "I don't want to have a suicide during his term of office or during the election." Nelson distanced himself from the statement, and Gustafson later apologized.

=== Results ===
Democratic Primary by county Chiles: 50–60%; 60–70%; 70–80%; 80–90%; Nelson: 50–60%

Democratic primary results
Party	Candidate	Votes	%
Democratic	Lawton Chiles	746,325	69.5
Democratic	Bill Nelson	327,731	30.5
Total votes		1,074,056	100.0

=== Aftermath ===
Nelson went on to win election as Florida State Treasurer in 1994 and United States senator, serving in Chiles's former seat, in 2000.

== General election ==
=== Candidates ===
- Lawton Chiles, former U.S. senator (Democratic)

- Buddy MacKay, former U.S. representative from Ocala and nominee for U.S. Senate in 1988

- Bob Martinez, incumbent governor (Republican)

- J. Allison DeFoor, Sheriff of Monroe County

=== Campaign finances ===
- Chiles/MacKay - $5,244,170.00.
- Martinez/DeFoor - $10,625,793.00.

=== Results ===
Florida gubernatorial election, 1990
Party	Candidate	Votes	%	±%
Democratic	Lawton Chiles	1,995,206	56.51%	+11.07
Republican	Bob Martinez (incumbent)	1,535,068	43.48%	−11.09
Write-in		597	0.0%	N/A
Total votes		3,530,871	100.00%	N/A
Democratic gain from Republican				

== Fallout ==
Chiles won African Americans (87% to 13%).
