= Larry Shackelford =

American politician

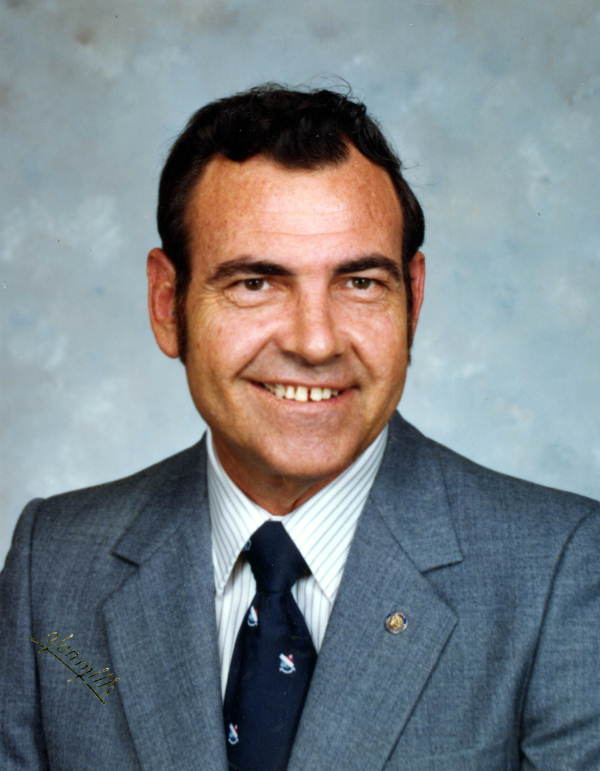
- Shackelford in 1980

Member of the Florida House of Representatives from the 72nd district
- In office 1978–1982
- Preceded by: Pat Neal
- Succeeded by: Vernon Peeples

Member of the Florida House of Representatives from the 67th district
- In office 1982–1986
- Preceded by: Elvin Martinez
- Succeeded by: Toby Holland

Personal details
- Born: August 11, 1933
- Died: November 23, 1992 (aged 59)
- Party: Democratic

Lawrence F. Shackelford (August 11, 1933 – November 23, 1992), also known as Larry Shackelford, was an American politician. He served as a Democratic member for the 67th and 72nd district of the Florida House of Representatives.

== Life and career ==
Shackelford was a tomato grower, tractor company owner and agriculture specialist.

In 1978, Shackelford was elected to represent the 72nd district of the Florida House of Representatives, succeeding Pat Neal. He served until 1982, when he was succeeded by Vernon Peeples. In the same year, he was elected to represent the 67th district, succeeding Elvin Martinez. He served until 1986, when he was succeeded by Toby Holland.

Shackelford died on November 23, 1992, at the age of 59.
