= Toby Holland (politician) =

American politician

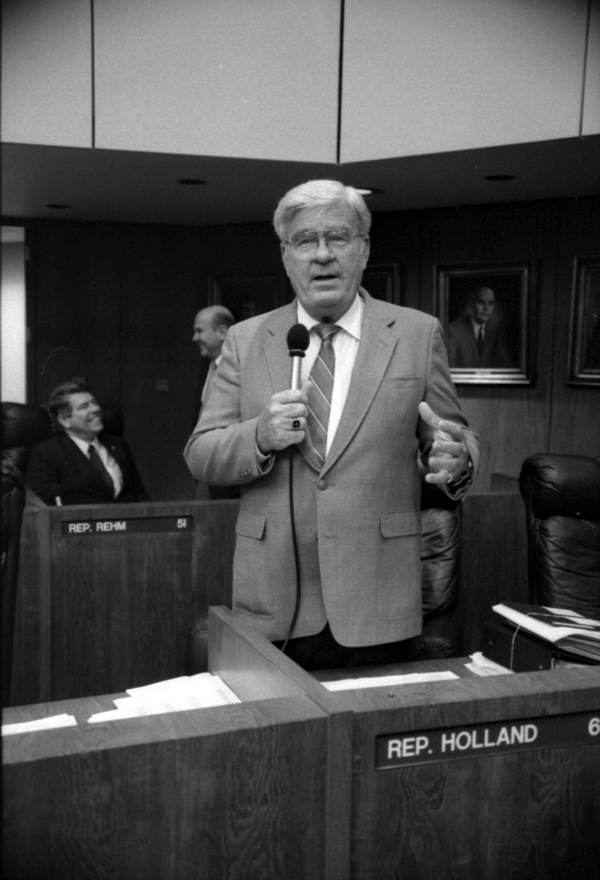
- Holland in 1988

Member of the Florida House of Representatives from the 67th district
- In office 1986–1992
- Preceded by: Larry Shackelford
- Succeeded by: Mark Ogles

Personal details
- Born: November 29, 1928 Long Beach, California, U.S.
- Died: June 21, 2021 (aged 92)
- Party: Republican

Toby Holland (November 29, 1928 – June 21, 2021), also known as J. J. Holland Jr., was an American politician. He served as a Republican member for the 67th district of the Florida House of Representatives.

== Life and career ==
Holland was born in Long Beach, California. He attended Manatee County High School.

In 1986, Holland was elected to represent the 67th district of the Florida House of Representatives, succeeding Larry Shackelford. He served until 1992, when he was succeeded by Mark Ogles.

Holland died on June 21, 2021, at the age of 92.
