= Richard J. Tillman =

American politician (1911–1983)

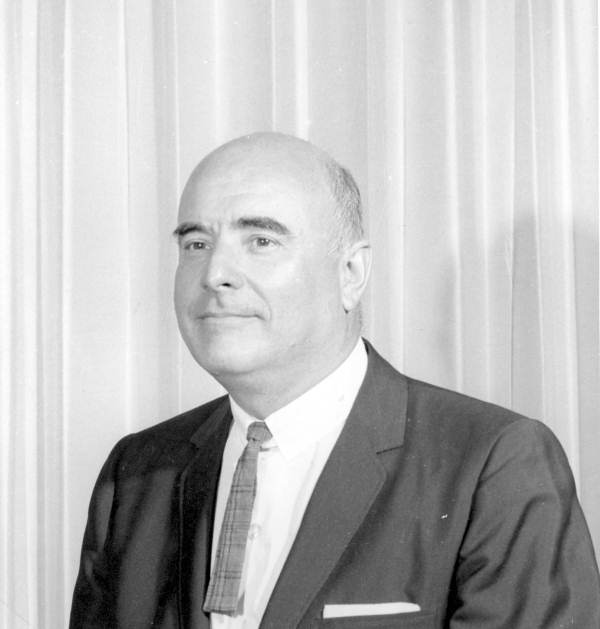
- Tillman in 1968

Member of the Florida House of Representatives from the 72nd district
- In office 1968–1970
- Preceded by: Harry H. Pfeiffer
- Succeeded by: F. Eugene Tubbs

Personal details
- Born: September 5, 1911 New York, U.S.
- Died: October 1983 (aged 72) Cocoa Beach, Florida, U.S.
- Party: Republican
- Education: New York University Tandon School of Engineering

Richard J. Tillman (September 5, 1911 – October 1983) was an American politician. He served as a Republican member for the 72nd district of the Florida House of Representatives.

Tillman was born in New York. He attended New York University Tandon School of Engineering. He moved to Florida in 1942 and worked as an engineer. In 1968 he was elected to represent the 72nd district of the Florida House of Representatives, serving until 1970.

Tillman died in October 1983 at the Health First's Cape Canaveral Hospital in Cocoa Beach, Florida, at the age of 72.
