= F. Eugene Tubbs =

American politician (1935–1978)

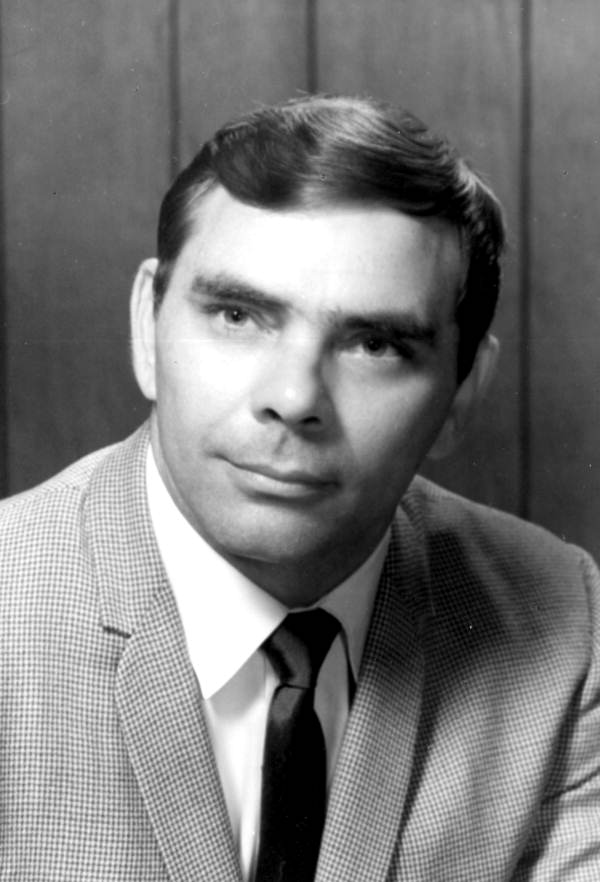
- Tubbs in 1970

Member of the Florida House of Representatives from the 72nd district
- In office 1970–1972
- Preceded by: Richard J. Tillman
- Succeeded by: John P. Harllee

Member of the Florida House of Representatives from the 45th district
- In office 1972–1974
- Preceded by: William L. Gibson
- Succeeded by: Clark Maxwell Jr.

Personal details
- Born: July 31, 1935 Dania Beach, Florida, U.S.
- Died: July 4, 1978 (aged 42) Lake City, Florida, U.S.
- Party: Republican
- Spouse: Caroline Tubbs

F. Eugene Tubbs (July 31, 1935 – July 4, 1978) was an American politician. He served as a Republican member for the 45th and 72nd district of the Florida House of Representatives.

Tubbs was born in Dania Beach, Florida, the son of Margaret Tubbs. Tubbs served as a flight surgeon on NASA’s Project Gemini. He was a doctor in Brevard County, Florida, and worked in the emergency department at the Tallahassee Memorial Hospital. He was credited as one of the creators of the sports drink Gatorade, along with four other people at the University of Florida.

In 1970, Tubbs was elected for the 72nd district of the Florida House of Representatives. He then represented the 45th district from 1972 to 1974. In the same year, he moved to Tallahassee, Florida.

In 1970 Tubbs sued the Stokely-Van Camp Company for $2 million as his share of the royalties from the development of Gatorade. The claim was later reduced to $9,000.

Tubbs died in July 1978 in a plane crash in Lake City, Florida, at the age of 42, along with his wife, Caroline.
