= Tommy Gregory =

American politician from Florida

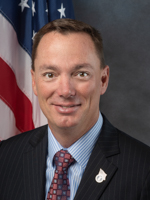

7th President of the State College of Florida
- Incumbent
- Assumed office July 1, 2024
- Preceded by: Carol Probstfeld

Member of the Florida House of Representatives
- In office November 6, 2018 – June 30, 2024
- Preceded by: Joe Gruters
- Succeeded by: Bill Conerly
- Constituency: 73rd district (2018–2022); 72nd district (2022–2024)

Personal details
- Born: January 11, 1972 (age 54) Tampa, Florida, U.S.
- Party: Republican
- Spouse: Erica Gregory
- Children: 3
- Education: United States Air Force Academy (BS); University of Texas, Austin (JD)
- Website: Campaign website

Tommy Gregory is a Republican politician and former member of the Florida House of Representatives who represented parts of eastern Manatee County from 2018 to 2024.

== Early life and education ==
Born in Tampa in 1972, Gregory attended the United States Air Force Academy from 1990 to 1994, graduating with a B.S. in economics, with military distinction. From 1997 to 2000, Gregory attended the University of Texas School of Law, graduating with a J.D., with honors.

== Early career ==
Gregory served in the United States Air Force for 20 years, where he achieved the rank of lieutenant colonel and served as a judge advocate general and prosecutor. After his military work, Gregory practiced law in Sarasota and managed a small business with his wife, Erica.

== Florida House of Representatives ==
Gregory defeated Democrat Liv Coleman in the November 6, 2018 general election, winning 61.87% of the vote. He was reelected subsequently in 2020 and 2022, winning 64.5% and 66.7% of the vote, respectively.

During his tenure, Gregory has been a member and chair of the House Judiciary Committee, and a member of the House Appropriations Committee. As of 2024, Gregory has sponsored over 20 bills.

== State College of Florida, Manatee-Sarasota ==
In 2024, Gregory was hired as president of State College of Florida, Manatee-Sarasota. He resigned from the legislature on June 30, 2024.
