= John P. Harllee =

American politician (1942–2017)

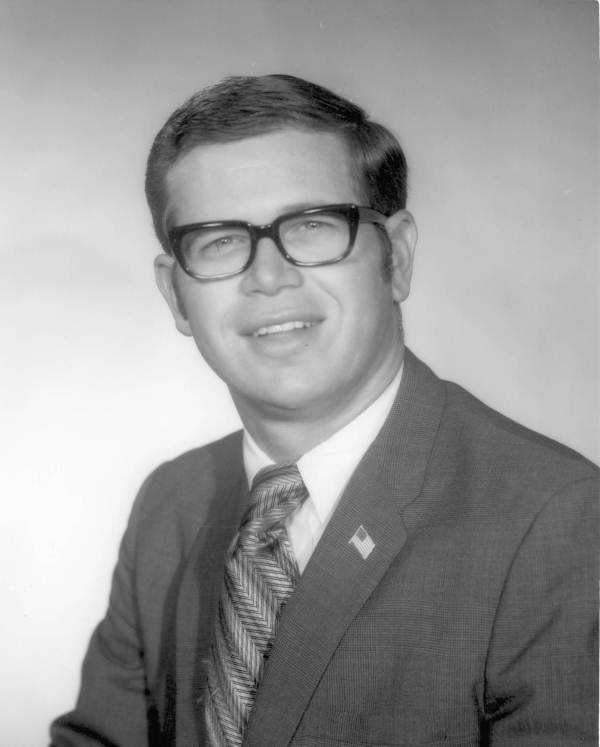
- Harllee in 1970

Member of the Florida House of Representatives from the 115th district
- In office 1970–1972
- Preceded by: Jerome Pratt
- Succeeded by: Murray Dubbin

Member of the Florida House of Representatives from the 72nd district
- In office 1972–1974
- Preceded by: F. Eugene Tubbs
- Succeeded by: Pat Neal

Personal details
- Born: John Pope Harllee III; May 8, 1942 Bradenton, Florida, U.S.
- Died: December 5, 2017 (aged 75)
- Party: Democratic
- Spouse: Kay Carson (m. 1964)
- Children: 3
- Education: Florida State University; University of Florida Levin College of Law

John Pope Harllee III (May 8, 1942 – December 5, 2017) was an American politician. He served as a Democratic member for the 72nd and 115th districts of the Florida House of Representatives.

Harllee was born in Bradenton, Florida, the son of Sara Scott and J. P. Harllee Jr. Harllee was raised in Palmetto, Florida and graduated from Palmetto High School in 1960. He then attended Florida State University where he earned a Bachelor of Science degree. While there he played football and was a member of the Phi Delta Theta fraternity. Harllee was awarded a Juris Doctor degree by the University of Florida Levin College of Law in 1967, and moved to Manatee County, Florida in 1968.

In 1970, Harllee was elected for the 115th district of the Florida House of Representatives. In 1972 he moved to the 72nd district, serving until 1974.

Harllee died in December 2017, at the age of 75.
