= Bill Conerly =

American politician

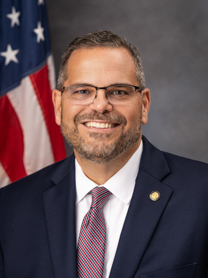

Member of the Florida House of Representatives from the 72nd district
- Incumbent
- Assumed office November 5, 2024
- Preceded by: Tommy Gregory

Personal details
- Party: Republican
- Spouse: Melanie Conerly
- Children: 3

William "Bill" Conerly is an American U.S. Navy veteran, civil engineer, and politician, serving as a member of the Florida House of Representatives since 2024. A member of the Republican Party, he represents Florida's 72nd House of Representatives district. Conerly has campaigned as a supporter of Donald Trump.

He served in the U.S. Navy for six years. He graduated from Valencia College.

He lives with his wife Melanie in Lakewood Ranch. He served on the planning commission for Manatee County. They have three children.
