= Carlos Beruff =

American real estate developer

Personal details
- Born: Carlos Miguel Beruff; January 1, 1958 (age 68) Miami, Florida, U.S.
- Party: Republican
- Education: Stetson University (attended); University of South Florida (attended)

Carlos Miguel Beruff (born January 1, 1958) is an American real estate developer and a Republican politician and donor. On March 1, 2017, Governor Rick Scott appointed him chair of the Florida Constitution Revision Commission for the 2018 election, a body that meets once every 20 years to propose amendments to the Florida Constitution.

Beruff was a candidate for the U.S. Senate in 2016, losing the Republican primary to Marco Rubio. He was a gubernatorial appointee to the Sarasota-Bradenton Airport Authority, the Southwest Florida Water Management Board, and the State College of Florida board. Beruff was born in Miami, Florida, to Cuban-immigrant parents.

== Early life and education ==
Beruff was born on January 1, 1958. His parents, Sylvia Vilarello and Marco Tulio Beruff, were Cuban refugees. He attended a boarding school in Howey-in-the-Hills, Florida. He later attended Stetson University, and later the University of South Florida.

== Career ==
In 1984, Beruff founded Medallion Home, a home builder located in Bradenton, Florida.

== Political career ==
In 2009, then-Florida Governor Charlie Crist appointed Beruff to the Sarasota-Bradenton Airport Authority, the Southwest Florida Water Management board, and the State College of Florida board. The next governor, Rick Scott, reappointed Beruff to all three positions.

In the 2010 U.S. Senate election in Florida, Beruff supported Crist, who was running as an independent and later became a Democrat, over Republican Marco Rubio.

=== Resignation from Southwest Florida Water Management District board ===
In August 2015, Beruff resigned from the Southwest Florida Water Management District board after voting to approve a friend's plan to destroy an acre of wetlands for a development. An administrative law judge recommended against issuing the permit, which allowed developer Pat Neal to remove mangroves and fill wetlands in order to build a family compound on Perico Island.

=== 2016 U.S. Senate campaign ===
Beruff ran for the U.S. Senate seat in Florida, mounting a primary challenge to Republican incumbent Marco Rubio in the 2016 election. Beruff has proposed temporarily halting immigration to the United States from Middle Eastern countries. In May 2016, Beruff was criticized for referring to President Barack Obama as "an animal". Beruff declined to issue an apology for the comments. He lost the August 30 primary, getting 18.49% of the vote and 264,427 votes.
