= Pat Neal =

American politician (born 1949)

Patrick "Pat" Neal

Member of the Florida Senate from the 24th district
- In office November 7, 1978 – November 4, 1986
- Preceded by: Thomas Gallen
- Succeeded by: Marlene Woodson Howard

Member of the Florida House of Representatives from the 72nd district
- In office November 5, 1974 – November 7, 1978
- Preceded by: John P. Harllee
- Succeeded by: Larry Shackelford

Personal details
- Born: March 4, 1949 (age 77) Des Moines, Iowa, U.S.
- Party: Republican
- Other political affiliations: Democratic (1974–1986)
- Spouse: Charlene Lovingood (m. 1978)
- Education: Wharton School of the University of Pennsylvania
- Profession: Real estate

Patrick K. "Pat" Neal (born March 4, 1949) is an American real estate developer and politician who is a former Florida State Senator and former representative in the Florida House of Representatives.

== Early life and education ==
Neal was born in Des Moines, Iowa in 1949. He earned a Bachelor of Science (BS) in economics from the Wharton School of the University of Pennsylvania. In 1969, he enlisted in the U.S. Army Reserve, serving as an officer from 1972 to 1975.

== Political career ==
He served in the Florida House of Representatives from 1974 through 1978 and in the Florida Senate from 1978 through 1986, where he was Chair of the Natural Resources Committee and the Senate Appropriations Committee. As a member of the Florida Senate, he represented Manatee, Hardee, DeSoto, Highlands, Okeechobee, and Glades counties.

During his time in office, Neal worked on policies focused on environmental protection. In 1983, he wrote Florida's first Comprehensive Wetland Act and Comprehensive Hazardous Waste Act to protect groundwater. He also co-sponsored the Estero Bay Aquatic Preserve Bill, recognizing the preserve as an outstanding water reserve and offering additional protection.

Neal is a member of Florida's Judicial Nominating Commission, representing nominees within the 12th Judicial Circuit. Neal is on the board of trustees for the American Enterprise Institute, a public policy organization based in Washington D.C. that researches government, politics, economics, and social welfare. He also currently serves as a member of the Investment Advisory Council of The Florida State Pension Fund, an organization providing oversight of decision-making and adherence to financial standards to funds. Neal also served as a former chairman of the Florida Commission on Ethics, overseeing the conduct of public employees in the state of Florida. Neal is also a member of the Reserve Officers Association, advocating for adequate funding of equipment, training requirements and employments rights for members of the Reserve.

== Criticism ==
Neal has faced criticism for his political influence and development practices. Sarasota and Manatee County residents have opposed approval of his developments due to negative environmental impacts and flooding concerns. Additionally, Neal has faced scrutiny for his contributions to dark money PACs and connections to regulatory bodies. Candidates backed by Neal, Carlos Beruff, and other real estate developers lost races across Manatee County in 2024.

== Personal life ==
Pat Neal is the chairman of the executive committee for Neal Communities based in Sarasota, Florida. He founded the company alongside his father, Paul Neal, in 1970. The first project Pat and his father undertook was Whitney Beach, found on Longboat Key, Florida. J. Paul Neal, Pat's grandfather, also worked in the homebuilding and real estate industry beginning in 1913.

In 2005, he donated 120 acres of land to Manatee County, wanting to ensure the protection of its wetlands and other aspects. In 2014, this was opened as the Neal Preserve, featuring boardwalk trails and other recreational opportunities woven into the environment.

Neal is also a current member of the board of trustees and former chairman on the executive committee for Florida TaxWatch, an independent, nonpartisan, nonprofit research institute in that aims to improve government efficiency and accountability.
