= Mike Bennett (politician) =

American politician

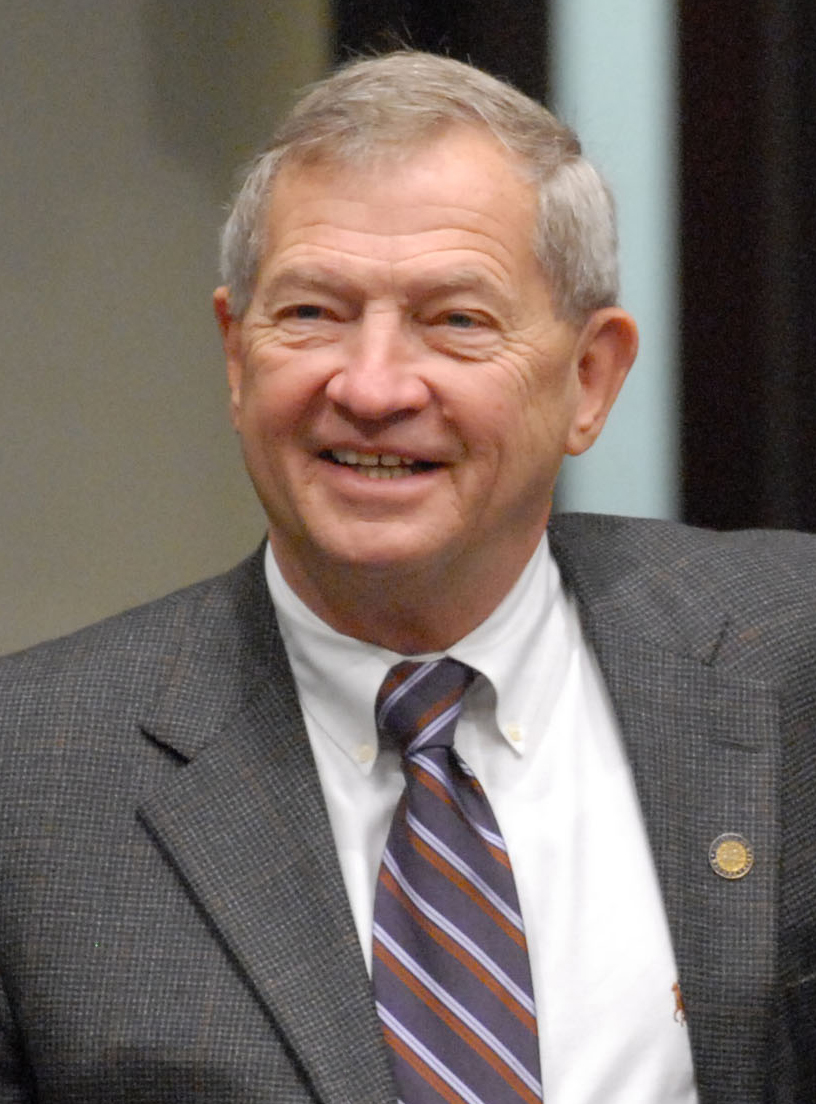

Manatee County Supervisor of Elections
- In office 2012–2024
- Preceded by: Bob Sweat
- Succeeded by: Scott Farrington

President pro tempore of the Florida Senate
- In office November 2010 – November 2012
- President: Mike Haridopolos
- Preceded by: Mike Fasano
- Succeeded by: Garrett Richter

Member of the Florida Senate from the 21st district
- In office November 5, 2002 – November 6, 2012
- Preceded by: Les Miller
- Succeeded by: Denise Grimsley

Member of the Florida House of Representatives from the 67th district
- In office November 7, 2000 – November 5, 2002
- Preceded by: Mark Ogles
- Succeeded by: Ron Reagan

Personal details
- Born: January 1, 1945 (age 81) Brainerd, Minnesota, U.S.
- Citizenship: USA
- Party: Republican
- Spouse: Diane M. "Dee" Bennett
- Profession: President, Aladdin Ward Electric

Michael S. Bennett (born January 1, 1945) is an American politician from Florida who is a member of the Republican Party. He served as a member of the Florida Senate representing the 21st District from 2002 to 2012. He was a member of the Florida House of Representatives from 2001 to 2002.

Bennett was elected to the Florida House of Representatives in November 2000, and was elected to the Senate in November 2002, and re-elected in 2004 and 2008. He represents District 21, which encompasses most of Manatee County, the northern portion of Sarasota County, the western part of DeSoto County, the central part of Charlotte County, and northwestern Lee County.

In 2010, Bennett was named President Pro Tempore of the Senate. Bennett serves as chairman of Community Affairs. In the past, he also chaired the Senate's Policy and Steering Committee on Commerce and Industry.

Bennett's other Senate committee memberships includes Banking and Insurance, Finance and Tax, Health Regulation, Military Affairs and Domestic Security, Policy and Steering Committee on Governmental Operations, Policy and Steering Committee on Ways and Means, Reapportionment, and Select Committee on Florida's Economy.

Senator Bennett was term limited in 2012. He served as Manatee County Supervisor of Elections until 2024.

== Personal life ==
Bennett moved to Florida in 1955 when he was 10 years old, joining the U.S. Navy in 1963 fresh out of high school, serving four tours during the Vietnam War.

After his military career, Bennett earned his bachelor of arts degree from Drake University in 1975, and his masters of business administration a year later.

He is the president of Aladdin Ward Electric, a company that he has been a part of since 1985.

Bennett is married to Diane Bennett.

== Election history ==
On November 4, 2008, Bennett was re-elected unopposed to the Florida Senate in a term that ends in 2012 when all senators, by law, are up for re-election. It was one of only six seats out of 21 up for grabs that had no opponent in the general election, and was one of four that went to Republicans.

Despite the lack of opposition, Bennett raised just under $322,000 between his filing for re-election in April 2005 to the November 2008 election.

Bennett also ran unopposed in 2004, last seeing an opponent in his first run for the Senate in 2002 when he faced Mark Flanagan in the Republican primary, and Democrat C.J. Czaia in the general election. In that campaign, Bennett raised more than $630,000, including a $100,000 loan he made to the campaign in early 2002. Flanagan raised $176,605 for the Republican primary while Garza raised just over $50,000 in the general election.

== 2010 legislative session ==
On November 4, 2009, Bennett introduced Senate Bill 598, part of a joint resolution with Republicans Baxter Troutman and Kevin Ambler in the Florida House of Representatives to increase length of terms for senators to six years, and state representatives to four years, capping years of service for all state lawmakers, elected county officials and municipal officers to 12 consecutive years in office. That resolution, however, died in committee the following April.

Bennett also filed S.B. 614 in November the same year, which would have required water and wastewater utilities to submit tariffs reflecting the surcharge to the Florida Public Service Commission for approval. That bill died in committee the following April.

== Senate Bill 360 ==
Bennett was the author of Senate Bill 360, a complex growth management bill that passed both houses and was signed by Gov. Charlie Crist on June 1, 2009. The bill essentially changed how local governments in some parts of the state could charge impact fees, eliminating developments of regional impact—where large-scale residential or commercial developments were responsible for upgrading transportation around the project—in high-density population areas.

The bill passed the Senate 32-8 on April 2, 2009, and later passed the House 76-41.

Tallahassee Circuit Judge Charles Francis, however, declared the law unconstitutional in August 2010, claiming it was an "unfunded mandate." The Florida Constitution generally prohibits lawmakers from forcing municipalities to spend more than 10 cents per Floridian.

== Gulf oil drilling opposition ==
In November 2009, Bennett wanted to have both sides of the Gulf oil drilling debate presented to a non-governmental group to review the science, saying he didn't think state lawmakers "knew enough" about the debate.

A year later, he was calling for no oil drilling off Florida's coast, instead encouraging the state to pursue alternative energy sources, including biofuels. Bennett said Florida's economic success depends on environmental preservation and not oil profits, and that drilling could have detrimental effects to the state's ecosystem.

== E-mail controversy ==
In May 2010, Bennett was checking e-mail during debate on the Senate floor when he was photographed opening a picture on his laptop computer depicting four women in bikinis.

The video of Bennett opening the image and closing it three seconds later was picked up by international media, many claiming Bennett was viewing pornography. However, a subsequent investigation by Tom Lyons with the Sarasota Herald-Tribune determined that Bennett simply opened an e-mail from Ray Fice, a former circuit court administrator and high school classmate of Bennett, who sent the picture as a joke of what he was missing at his school's class reunion.
