= Vernon Peeples =

American politician

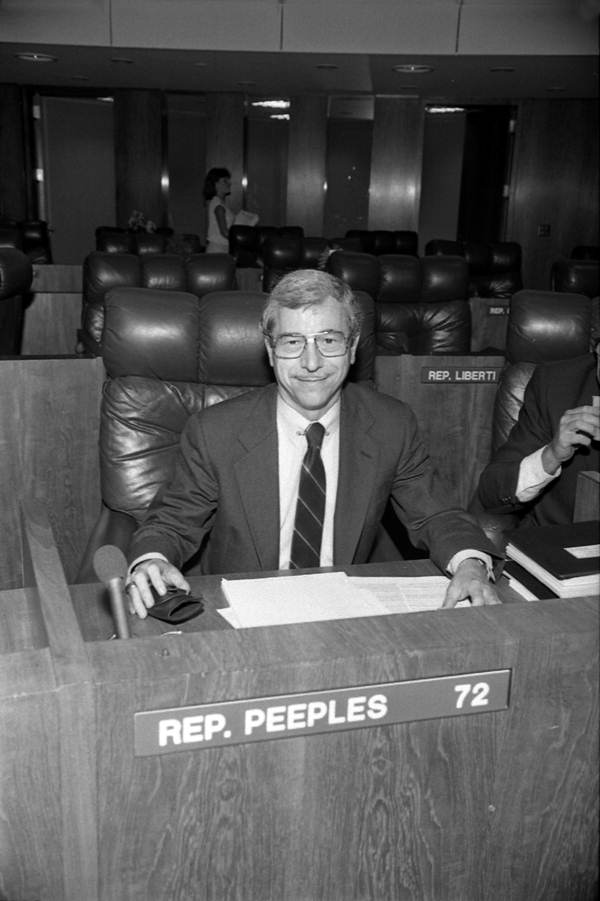
- Peeples in 1986

Member of the Florida House of Representatives from the 72nd district
- In office 1982–1996
- Preceded by: Larry Shackelford
- Succeeded by: Lindsay Harrington

Personal details
- Born: March 2, 1930 Live Oak, Florida, U.S.
- Died: April 12, 2015 (aged 85)
- Party: Democratic
- Parent: Vasco Peeples (father)
- Relatives: William L. Peeples (great-grandfather); Daniel Bell (great-great-great grandfather)
- Education: Florida State University

Vernon E. Peeples (March 2, 1930 – April 12, 2015) was an American politician. He served as a Democratic member for the 72nd district of the Florida House of Representatives.

== Life and career ==
Peeples was born in Live Oak, Florida. He attended Florida State University.

In 1982, Peeples was elected to represent the 72nd district of the Florida House of Representatives, succeeding Larry Shackelford. He served until 1996, when he was succeeded by Lindsay Harrington.

Peeples died on April 12, 2015, at the age of 85.
