= Florida Atlantic University College of Business =

Business school of Florida Atlantic University

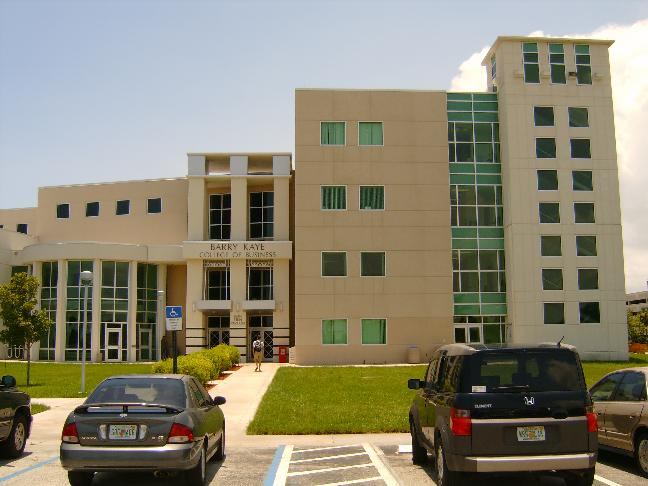
- Former names: Barry Kaye College of Business
- Parent institution: Florida Atlantic University
- Location: Boca Raton, Florida
- Website: business.fau.edu

The FAU College of Business is located in Boca Raton, Florida and is one of the ten academic colleges of Florida Atlantic University. It offers business degree programs at the undergraduate and graduate levels.

== Departments ==
It offers bachelor's degree programs in:

- accounting
- economics
- finance
- health administration
- hospitality and tourism management
- international business and trade
- management (leadership or entrepreneurship tracks)
- management information systems
- marketing
- real estate

and master's degree programs in:

- accounting
- business administration
- economics
- finance
- health administration
- international business and taxation.

It has a doctoral program in business administration cooperatively with Florida International University.

== Barry Kaye ==
Barry Kaye has donated a total of $5 million to Florida Atlantic University, which is the third largest gift to the university. His contributions have gone toward naming the Carole and Barry Kaye ’05 Great Hall, establishing the Carole and Barry Endowment Fund, renovating the Carole and Barry Kaye Performing Arts Auditorium lobby, and supporting the College of Business. In 2005, Barry Kaye received an honorary doctorate from FAU. Barry Kaye's name was attached to the College of Business school in recognition of a $16 million pledge. In 2008 due to economic conditions, Kaye amended his pledge and requested that his name be removed from the College of Business school title.

== Recognition ==
The College of Business's programs and schools have been ranked by a number of publications since the college's inception. The college's School of Accounting is ranked 6th in the nation based on the percentage of candidates passing all four parts of the Certified Public Accountant examination. The Virtual MBA program has been ranked among the nation’s top 25 online business programs by U.S. News & World Report every year since its inception in 2000. The college's Department of Finance was ranked 35th in the world based on a compilation of published research in 16 core financial journals and 2nd in the nation for published research in financial education. The Barry Kaye College of Business' Entrepreneurship Program was included in the top 50 in the country by Success Magazine and was ranked as the best Florida based program by entrepreneurship. The college's Department of Information Technology and Operations Management was also ranked in the nation’s top 50 programs by Decision Line.

== Accreditation ==
The College is fully accredited through the University by the Southern Association of Colleges and Schools Commission on Colleges It is also accredited by the Association to Advance Collegiate Schools of Business.
