= Mark Ogles =

Republican Party politician (born 1962)

Mark R. Ogles
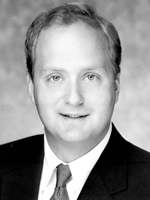

Member of the Florida House of Representatives from the 67th District
- In office November 3, 1992 – November 7, 2000
- Preceded by: Toby Holland
- Succeeded by: Mike Bennett

Personal details
- Born: January 5, 1962 (age 64) Seoul Air Base, South Korea
- Party: Republican
- Education: Furman University (B.S.); University of Tennessee (M.S.)
- Occupation: Planner, real estate agent

Mark R. Ogles (born January 5, 1962) is a Republican politician who served as a member of the Florida House of Representatives from the 67th District from 1992 to 2000.

== Early life and career ==
Ogles was born in South Korea and attended Furman University, receiving a bachelor's degree in geology in 1984, and the University of Tennessee, receiving his master's degree in planning in 1987. He moved to Florida in 1987, and worked as a planner for the Manatee County School Board.

== Florida House of Representatives ==
In 1992, incumbent Republican State Representative Toby Holland declined to seek re-election, and Ogles ran to succeed him in the 67th District, which included eastern Manatee County and parts of Hillsborough and Sarasota counties. He faced businessman Thomas Schultz in the Republican primary, and ultimately defeated him with 56 percent of the vote. Ogles faced retiree Robert Keller, the Democratic nominee, in the general election. Ogles defeated Keller in a landslide, winning 63 percent of the vote to Keller's 37 percent.

In 1997 Ogles and Anna Cowin sponsored legislation legalizing the practice of chemical castration of sex offenders as a condition of their parole. Despite the bill's draconian phrasing, a 2005 Palm Beach Post review found that Florida's use of their chemical castration measure was limited to 15 offenders out of a population of 2,300.

Ogles was unopposed for re-election in 1994, 1996, and 1998. He was term-limited in 2000 and could not run for re-election to a fifth term.
