= Tommy Stevens (politician) =

American politician

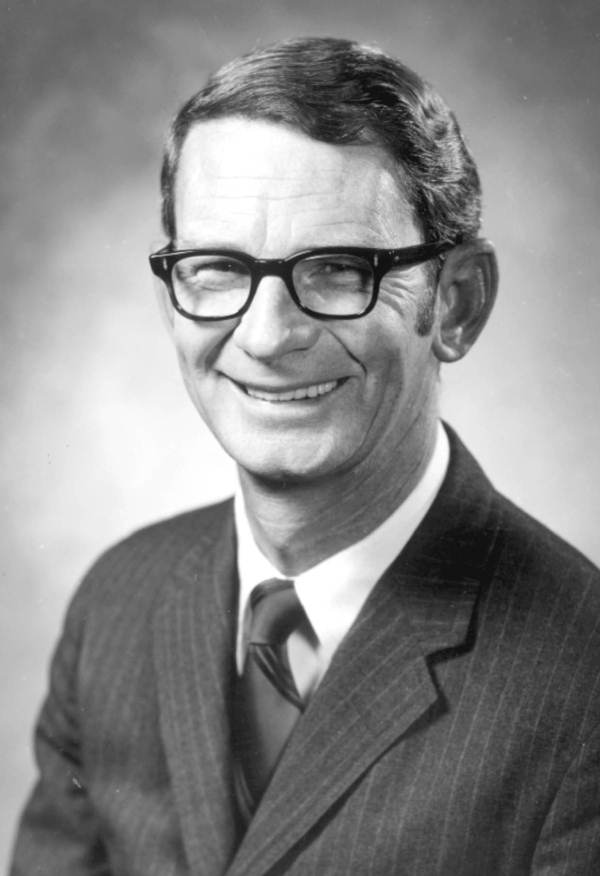
- Stevens in 1970

Member of the Florida House of Representatives from Pasco County
- In office 1962–1966

Member of the Florida House of Representatives from the 70th district
- In office 1967–1972
- Preceded by: District established
- Succeeded by: Elvin Martinez

Personal details
- Born: May 20, 1931 Dade City, Florida, U.S.
- Died: November 6, 2011 (aged 80)
- Party: Democratic
- Education: University of Florida; St. Leo Junior College; University of South Florida

Tommy Stevens (May 20, 1931 – November 6, 2011) was an American politician. He served as a Democratic member for the 70th district of the Florida House of Representatives.

== Life and career ==
Stevens was born in Dade City, Florida. He attended the University of Florida, St. Leo Junior College and the University of South Florida.

In 1962, Stevens was elected to the Florida House of Representatives, serving until 1966. In 1967, he was elected as the first representative of the newly-established 70th district of the Florida House. He served until 1972, when he was succeeded by Elvin Martinez.

Stevens died on November 6, 2011, at the age of 80.
