= Lindsay Harrington =

American politician (born 1944)

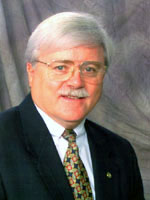

Speaker pro tempore of the Florida House of Representatives
- In office November 19, 2002 – November 2, 2004
- Preceded by: Sandra Murman
- Succeeded by: Leslie Waters

Member of the Florida House of Representatives from the 72nd district
- In office November 5, 1996 – November 2, 2004
- Preceded by: Vernon Peeples
- Succeeded by: Paige Kreegel

Personal details
- Born: November 12, 1944 (age 81) Charlottesville, Virginia, U.S.
- Party: Republican
- Spouse: Deborah Lynn Harrington
- Children: Loren Myles and Lisa Nicolle Harrington; Brian and Christopher Stuut
- Education: Virginia Commonwealth University (B.S.); Pepperdine University (M.A.)
- Occupation: Real estate broker

Lindsay M. Harrington is a Republican politician and real estate broker who served as a member of the Florida House of Representatives from 1996 to 2004.

== Early life and career ==
Harrington was born in Charlottesville, Virginia in 1944. He attended Virginia Commonwealth University, receiving his bachelor's degree in business administration in 1973, and Pepperdine University, receiving a master's degree in human resource management in 1976. He moved to Florida in 1979 and worked as a real estate broker.

In 1988, Harrington ran for the Punta Gorda City Council, challenging incumbent City Councilman Sandy MacGibbon in District 2. In the February 2, 1988, primary election, MacGibbon narrowly placed first over Harrington, but neither candidate received a majority of the vote, and a runoff election was held on February 16. Harrington defeated MacGibbon in the runoff election, winning 60 percent of the vote to MacGibon's 40 percent. Harrington was re-elected without opposition in 1990, 1992, 1994, and 1996. Harrington was elected by the City Council to serve as Vice Mayor from 1991 to 1994 and as Mayor from 1995 to 1996, and served as the Chairman of the Charlotte County Republican Party from 1988 to 1994.

== Florida House of Representatives ==
Harrington challenged Democratic State Representative Vernon Peeples for re-election in 1996 in the 72nd District, which included DeSoto County, Hardee County, and parts of Charlotte and Lee counties. He campaigned on his record in Punta Gorda, pointing to a 1996 Money magazine survey showing the city the second-best place to live in the country, while Peeples campaigned on his experience in the legislature. Harrington narrowly defeated Peeples for re-election, winning 53 percent of the vote to Peeples's 47 percent, as Republicans won control of the Florida House of Representatives for the first time since Reconstruction.

Harrington was unopposed for re-election in 1998. In 2000, he was challenged by Nancy Grant, the founder of the Christian Party of Florida. Harrington defeated Grant in a landslide, winning 77 percent of the vote to her 24 percent. Harrington sought his fourth and final term in the State House in 2002, and was challenged by Libertarian Dirk Clary. He defeated Clary by a wide margin, receiving 80 percent of the vote to Clary's 20 percent.

During Harrington's final term in the House, he was elected to serve as Speaker pro tempore of the House.

== Post-legislative career ==
In 2005, Governor Jeb Bush appointed Harrington to serve on the Florida Gulf Coast University Board of Trustees. He served on the Board until 2011, when he was succeeded by Dorene S. McShea. In 2017, Harrington served on the FGCU presidential search committee.
