= Nova University =

Nova University may refer to:

- Nova Southeastern University in the United States
- NOVA University Lisbon in Portugal
