= Steven Machat =

American music executive, author, and producer

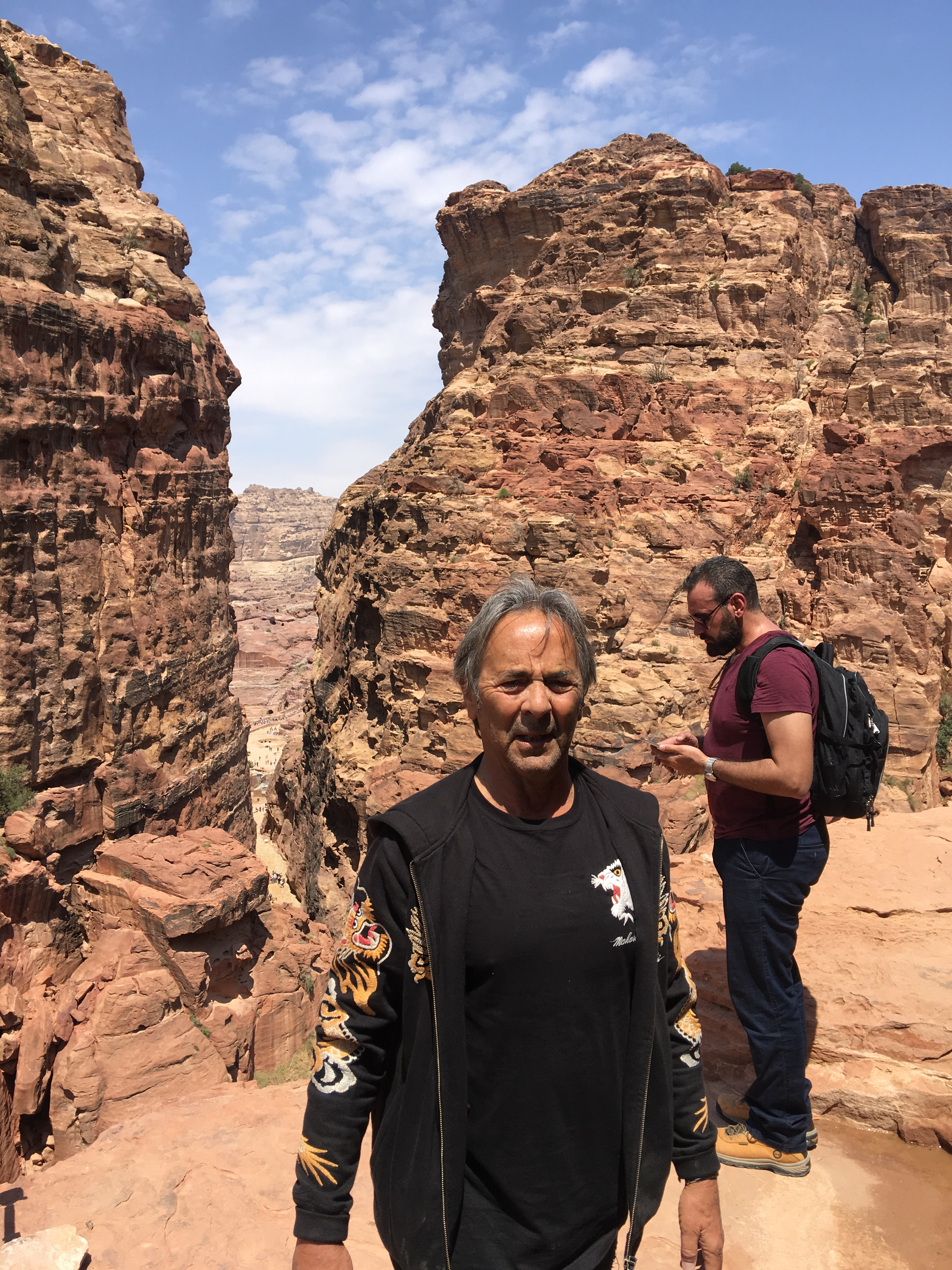
- Steven Machat
- Born: October 18, 1952 (age 73); Manhattan, New York, U.S.
- Occupations: Music executive, author, producer
- Known for: Bird on a Wire restoration; The SSK Organization; Buena Vista Orchestra

Steven Machat (born October 18, 1952) is an American music-business executive, author, and producer. He is credited as the producer of the 2010 restoration of Leonard Cohen: Bird on a Wire, the documentary of Cohen's 1972 European tour. He has also received credits on several feature film soundtracks. In the 2020s, he co-founded The SSK Organization, a company that includes SSK Music Presents, SSK Records, SSK Music Publishing Orbit, and the School of Sacred Knowledge, through which he produces the Buena Vista Orchestra.

== Early life and education ==
Machat was born in Manhattan, New York, the son of entertainment attorney Marty Machat, who represented artists such as Phil Spector, Sam Cooke, and the Rolling Stones. He studied accounting at the University of Miami before attending Vanderbilt University Law School.

== Career ==
=== Jet Records and AMI Management ===
In the late 1970s, Machat worked in business and legal affairs with Jet Records, a label then associated with acts including Electric Light Orchestra and Ozzy Osbourne.

By the mid-1980s he was active in artist management, with credits on projects by New Edition, Ready for the World, and John Waite. He was also involved in launching Bobby Brown's solo career after his departure from New Edition.

=== Film and production work ===
Machat is credited as producer of the 2010 restoration of Leonard Cohen: Bird on a Wire, which premiered at the Green Man Festival in Wales. He has also held music supervisor and production credits on films including Judge Dredd (1995) and Bully (2001).

=== Hippos in Tanks ===
From 2010 onward, his family was closely associated with the experimental label Hippos in Tanks, founded by his son Barron Machat. The label released music by artists including Grimes and Arca. Following Barron's death in 2015, outlets such as Pitchfork and Fact documented the label's influence.

=== 2020s: The SSK Organization ===
In the 2020s, Machat co-founded The SSK Organization, a multi-faceted company that encompasses several branches: SSK Music Presents (touring and live production), SSK Records (record label), SSK Music Publishing Orbit (publishing), and the School of Sacred Knowledge, a repository of his writings and published works including Gods, Gangsters and Honour. Through SSK Music Presents, he is credited as producer of The Buena Vista Orchestra, a touring ensemble inspired by the legacy of Cuban music.

== Publications ==
Machat is the author of several books. His memoir Gods, Gangsters & Honour was published in the UK in 2009, excerpted in The Independent, and reviewed in Record Collector. His later works include Highways of Man, Man, Community & Living the American Dream, Sacred Knowledge, Spiritual Insomnia, Unraveling the Bible, and I Can Hear Music: The Heroes and Villains of the Muses.

== Political activity ==
Machat ran as an independent candidate for the U.S. Senate in Florida in 2016 and as a Democratic candidate for Florida's 26th congressional district in 2018.

== Personal life ==
Machat has been married three times and has two children. His son Barron Machat (1987–2015), co-founder of the record label Hippos in Tanks, died in a car accident in 2015.

== Selected credits ==
=== Film and television ===
- Leonard Cohen: Bird on a Wire (2010 restoration) – producer
- Judge Dredd (1995) – executive music supervisor
- Bully (2001) – executive soundtrack producer

=== Artist management ===
- New Edition – management/direction (mid-1980s)
- Ready for the World – management (1985)
- John Waite – management (1985)
