= Daniel Bell (politician) =

American politician

Member of the Legislative Council of the Territory of Florida
- In office 1840–1841

Member of the Florida Senate from the 10th district
- In office 1845

Personal details
- Party: Democratic
- Relatives: Vernon Peeples (great-great-great grandson)

Daniel Bell was an American politician. He served as a Democratic member of the Legislative Council of the Territory of Florida. He also served as a member for the 10th district of the Florida Senate.
