= List of Ron DeSantis 2024 presidential campaign endorsements =

This is a list of notable individuals and organizations who endorsed Ron DeSantis to be the Republican Party's nominee in the 2024 U.S. presidential election. DeSantis withdrew his candidacy in January 2024.

== Federal executive officials ==
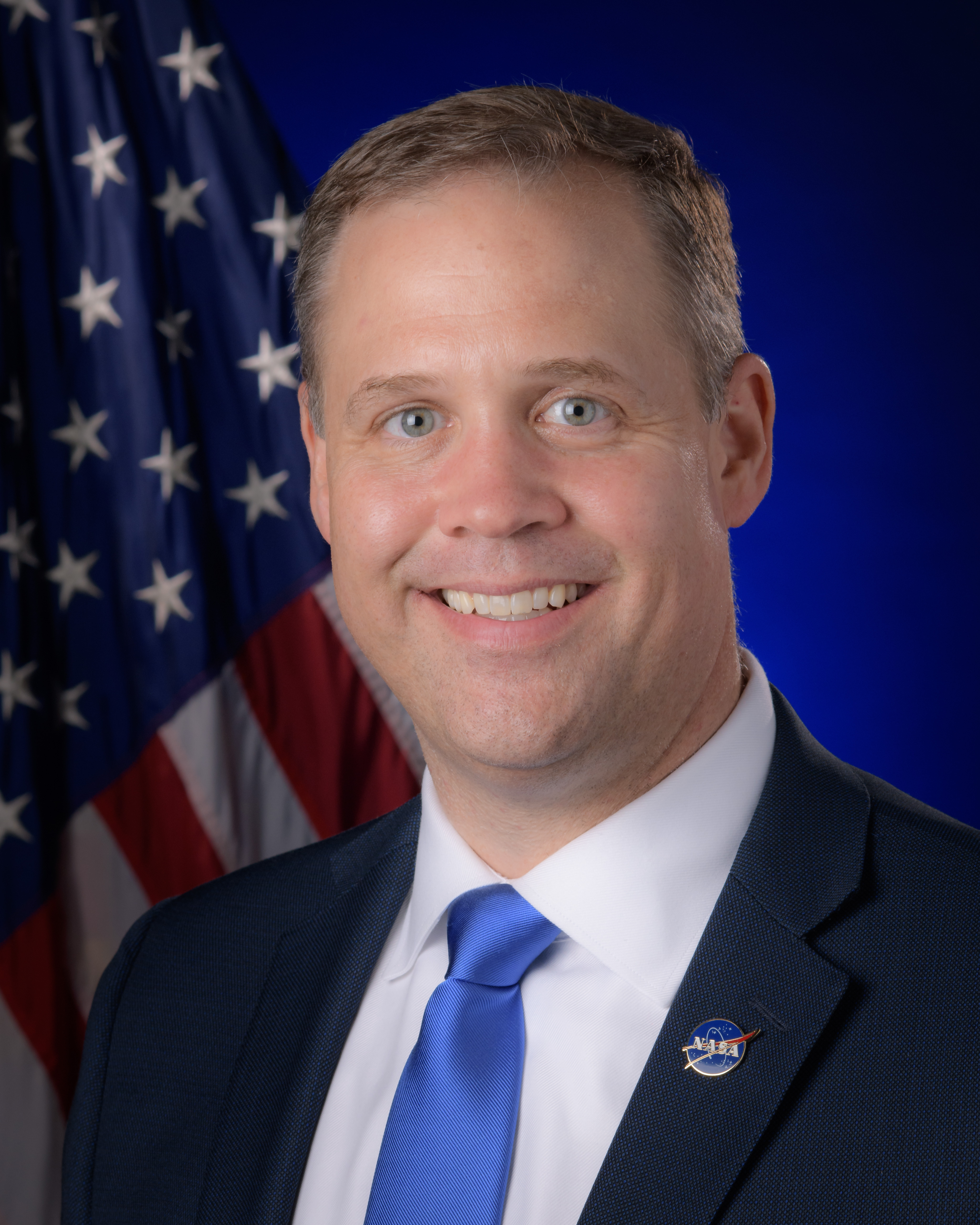
Jim Bridenstine

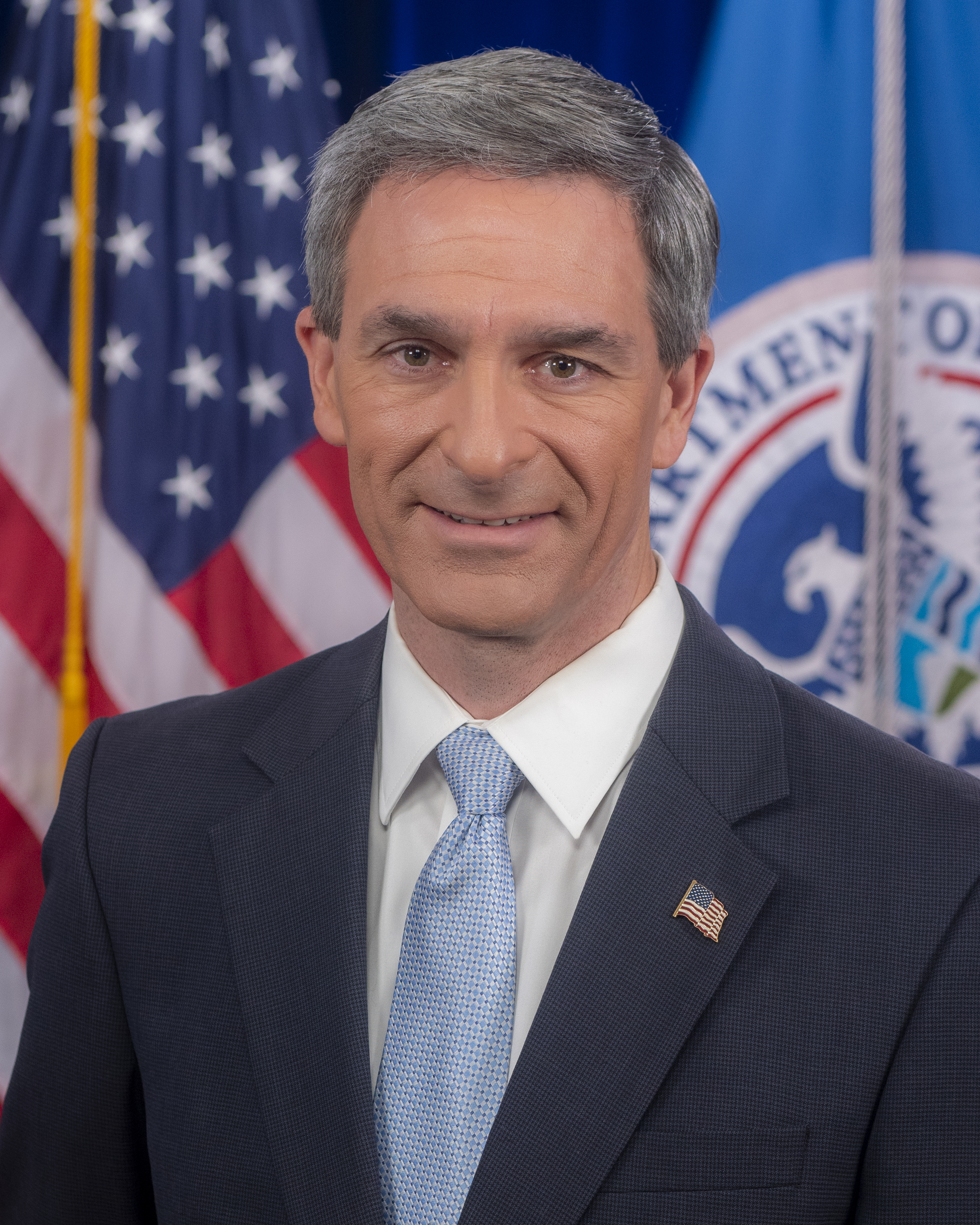
Ken Cuccinelli

=== Department of State ===
- John D. Rood, 11th U.S. ambassador to the Bahamas (2004–2007)
- Clifford M. Sobel, U.S. ambassador to the Netherlands (2001–2005) and Brazil (2006–2009)
- Donald Tapia, U.S. ambassador to Jamaica (2019–2021)

=== Department of Justice ===
- John C. Anderson, United States attorney for the District of New Mexico (2018–2021)
- Charles J. Cooper, U.S. assistant attorney general for the Office of Legal Counsel (1985–1988)
- D. Michael Hurst Jr., United States attorney for the Southern District of Mississippi (2017–2021)
- Larry Keefe, United States Attorney for the Northern District of Florida (2019–2021)
- Jesse Panuccio, U.S. associate attorney general (2017, 2018–2019)
- R. Trent Shores, United States attorney for the Northern District of Oklahoma (2017–2021)
- Jay Town, United States Attorney for the Northern District of Alabama (2017–2020)
- Nicholas A. Trutanich, United States attorney for the District of Nevada (2019–2021)

=== Other ===
- Jim Bridenstine, 13th administrator of the National Aeronautics and Space Administration (2018–2021) and member of the U.S. House of Representatives from Oklahoma's 1st district (2013–2018)
- Ken Cuccinelli, senior official performing the duties of the deputy secretary of Homeland Security (2019–2021), senior official performing the duties of the director of United States Citizenship and Immigration Services (2019–2021), principal deputy director of the United States Citizenship and Immigration Services (2019–2021), 46th attorney general of Virginia (2010–2014), and member of the Virginia Senate from the 37th district (2002–2010)
- Ed Rollins, White House director of political and intergovernmental affairs (1985) and White House director of political affairs (1982–1983)

== U.S. congressmen ==
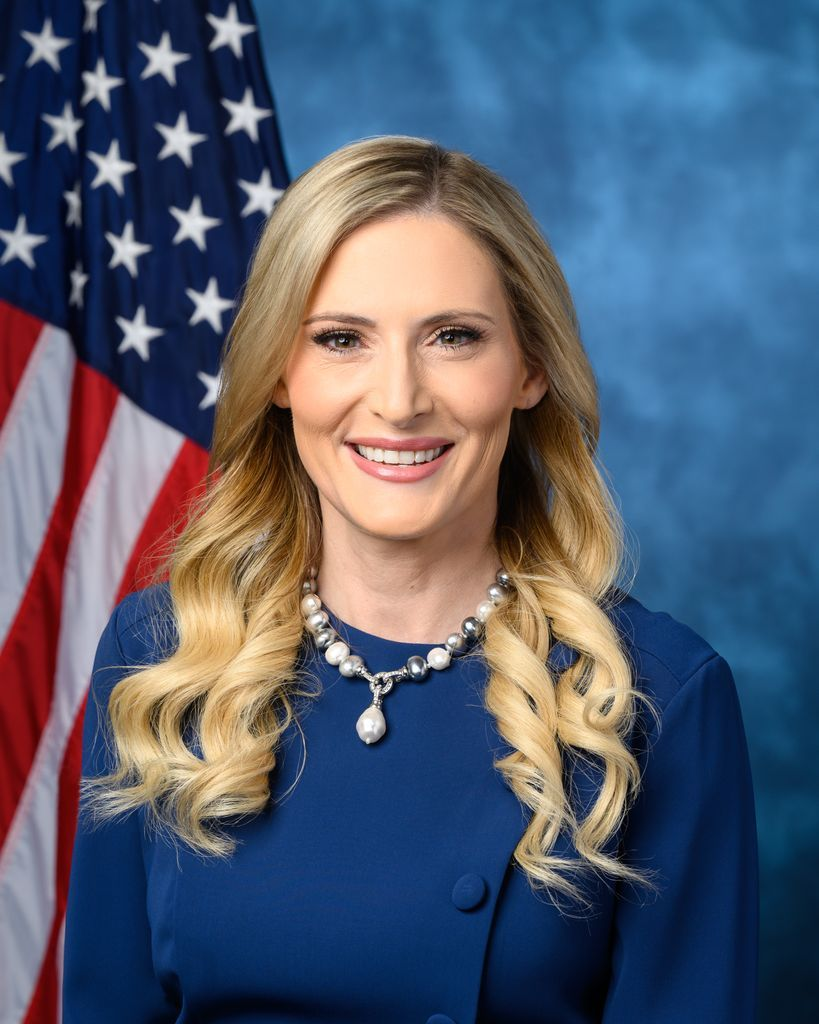
Laurel Lee

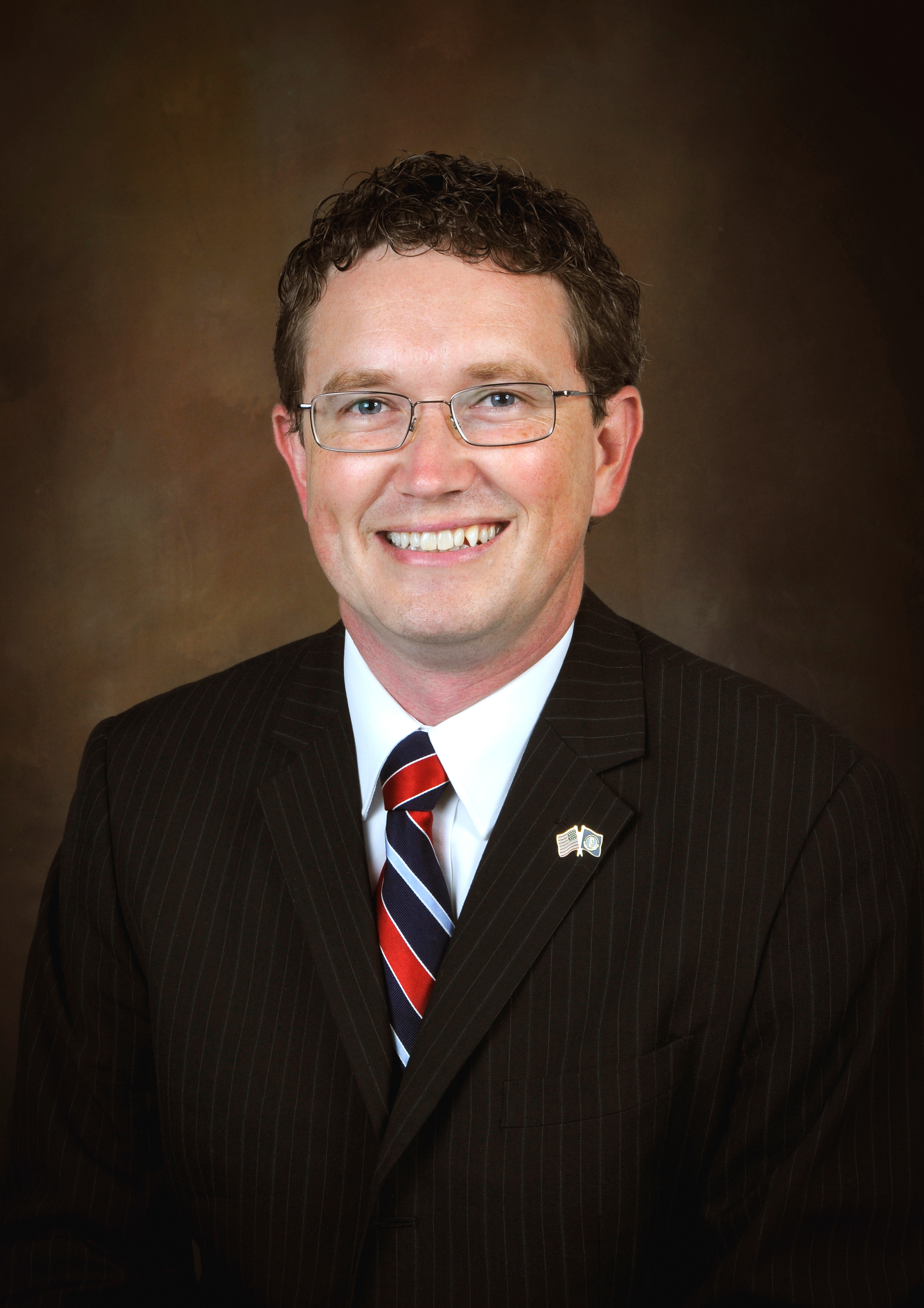
Thomas Massie

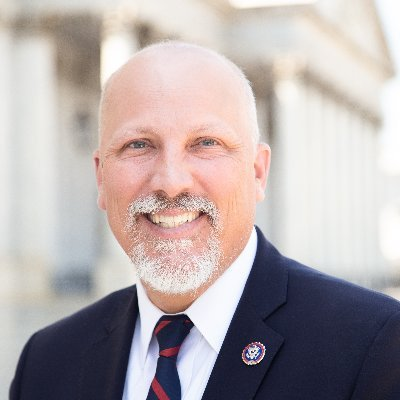
Chip Roy

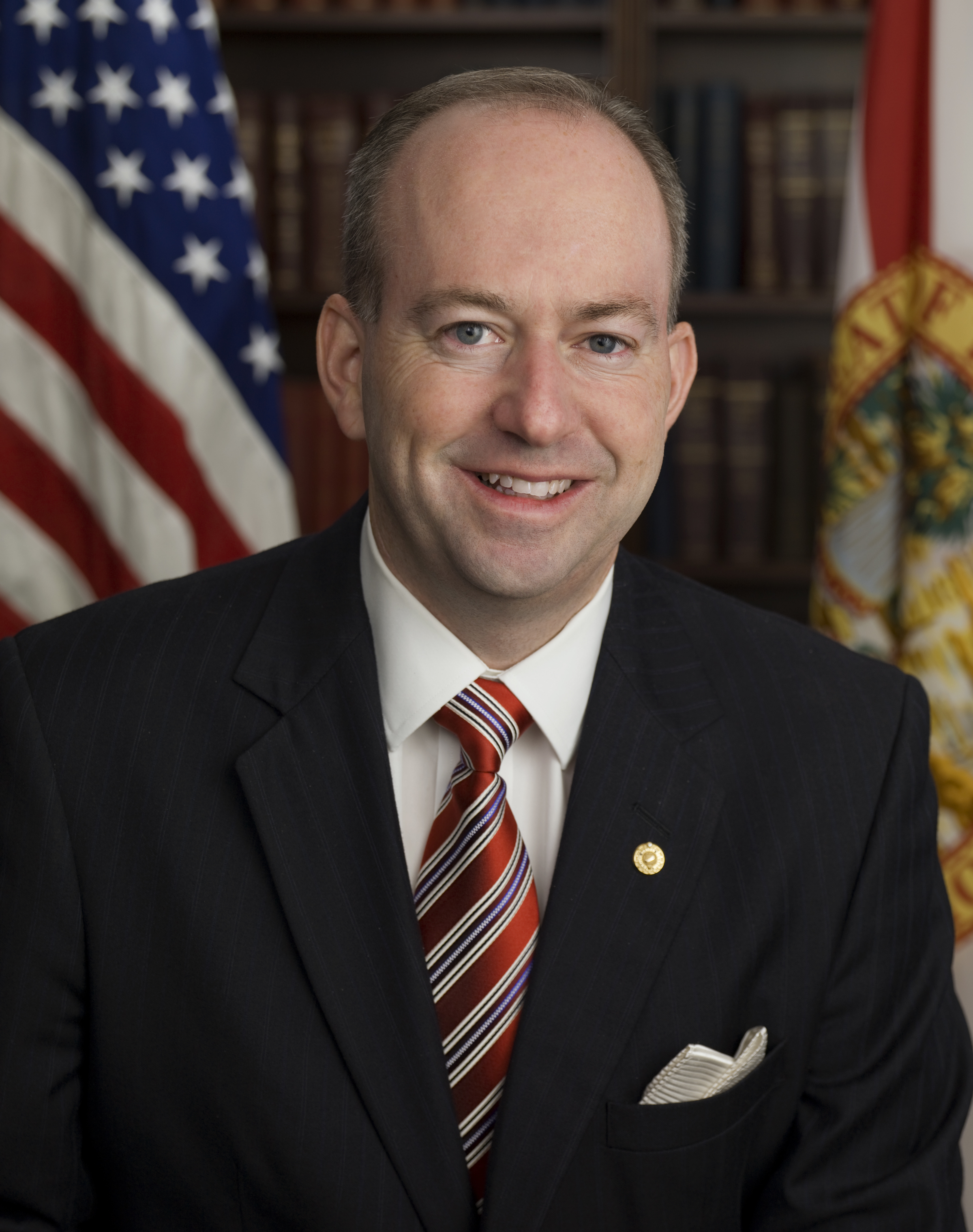
George LeMieux

=== Current ===
==== Representatives ====
- Bob Good, chair of the House Freedom Caucus (2024–present) and member of the U.S. House of Representatives from Virginia's 5th district (2021–present)
- Laurel Lee, member of the U.S. House of Representatives from Florida's 15th district (2023–present)
- Thomas Massie, member of the U.S. House of Representatives from Kentucky's 4th district (2012–present)
- Tom McClintock, member of the U.S. House of Representatives from California (2009–present)
- Rich McCormick, member of the U.S. House of Representatives from Georgia's 6th district (2023–present)
- Chip Roy, member of the U.S. House of Representatives from Texas's 21st district (2019–present)

=== Former ===
- Greg Ganske, member of the U.S. House of Representatives from Iowa's 4th district (1995–2003)
- George LeMieux, United States senator from Florida (2009–2011)
- Lamar Smith, chair of the House Science Committee (2013–2019), chair of the House Judiciary Committee (2011–2013), chair of the House Ethics Committee (1999–2001), member of the U.S. House of Representatives from Texas's 21st district (1987–2019), member of the Bexar County Commission from the 3rd district (1983–1985), and member of the Texas House of Representatives from the 57th district (1981–1982)

== State executive officials ==
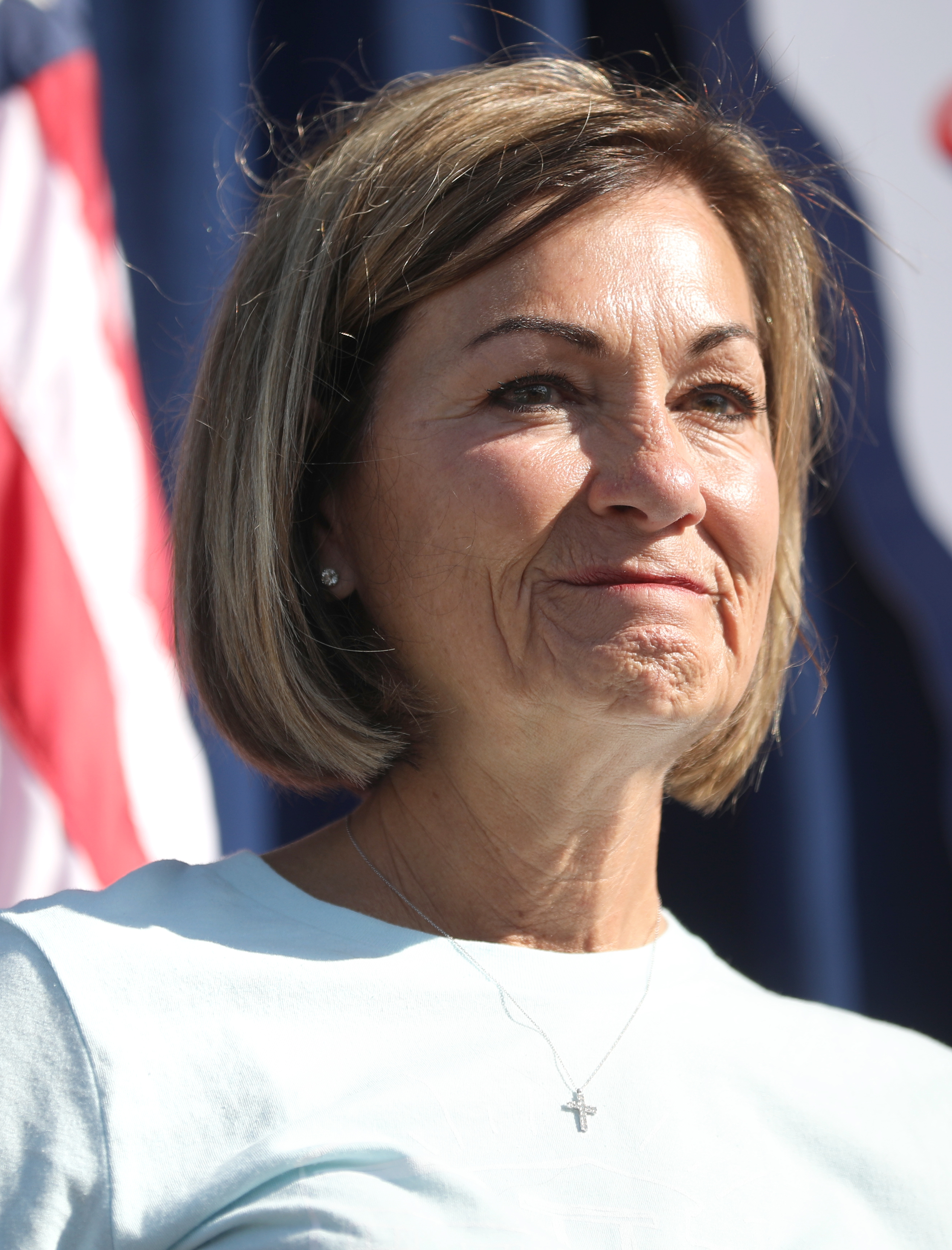
Kim Reynolds

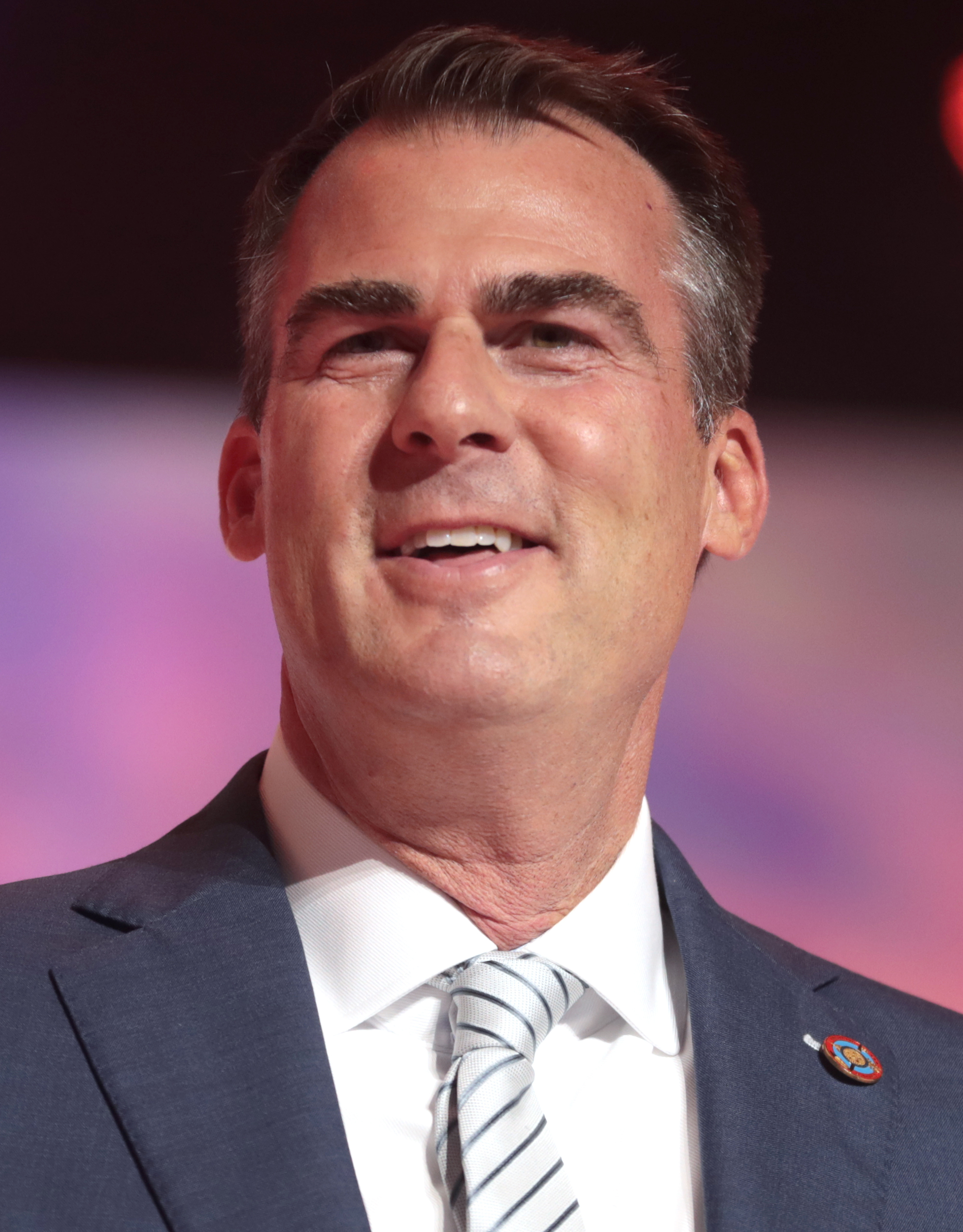
Kevin Stitt

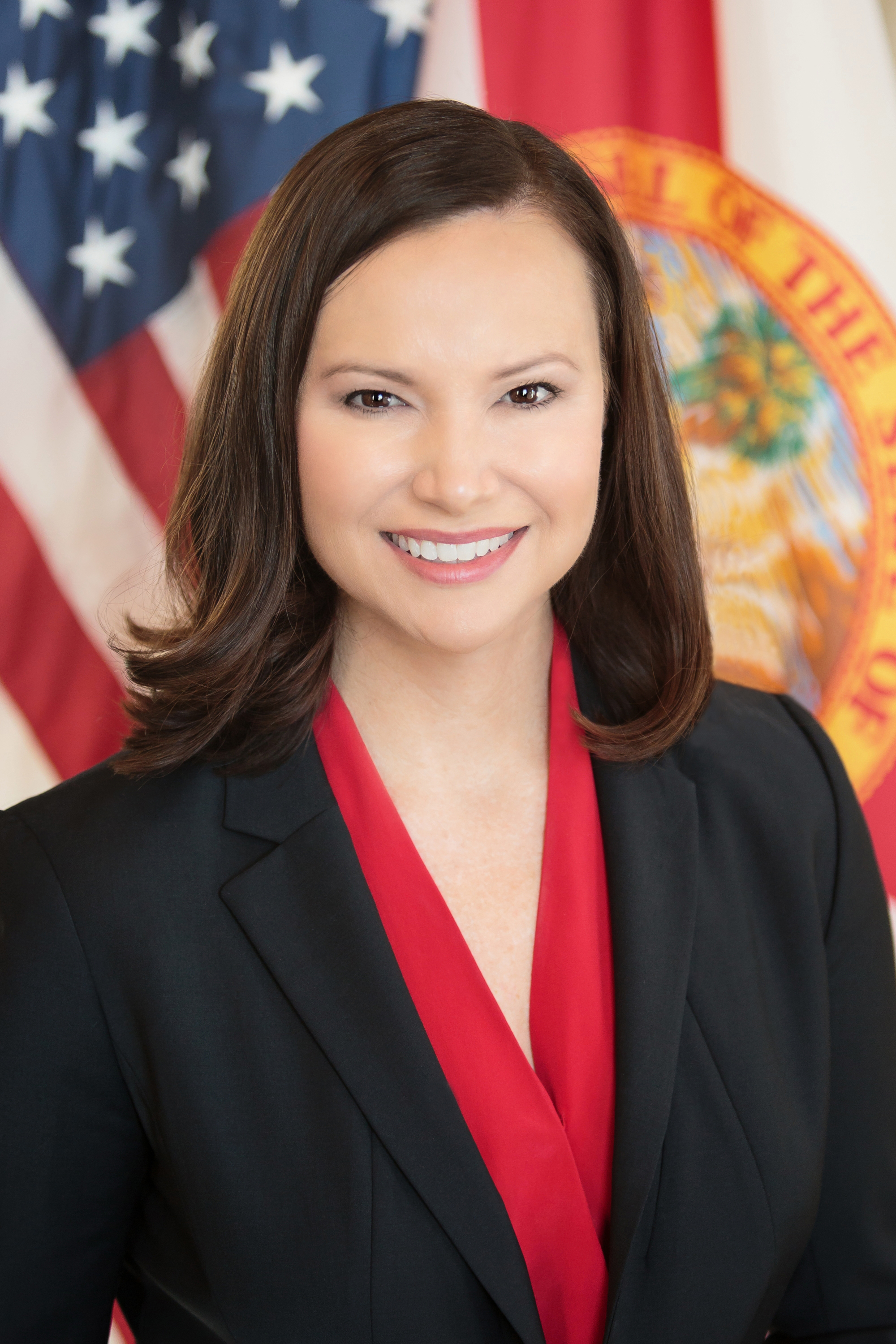
Ashley Moody

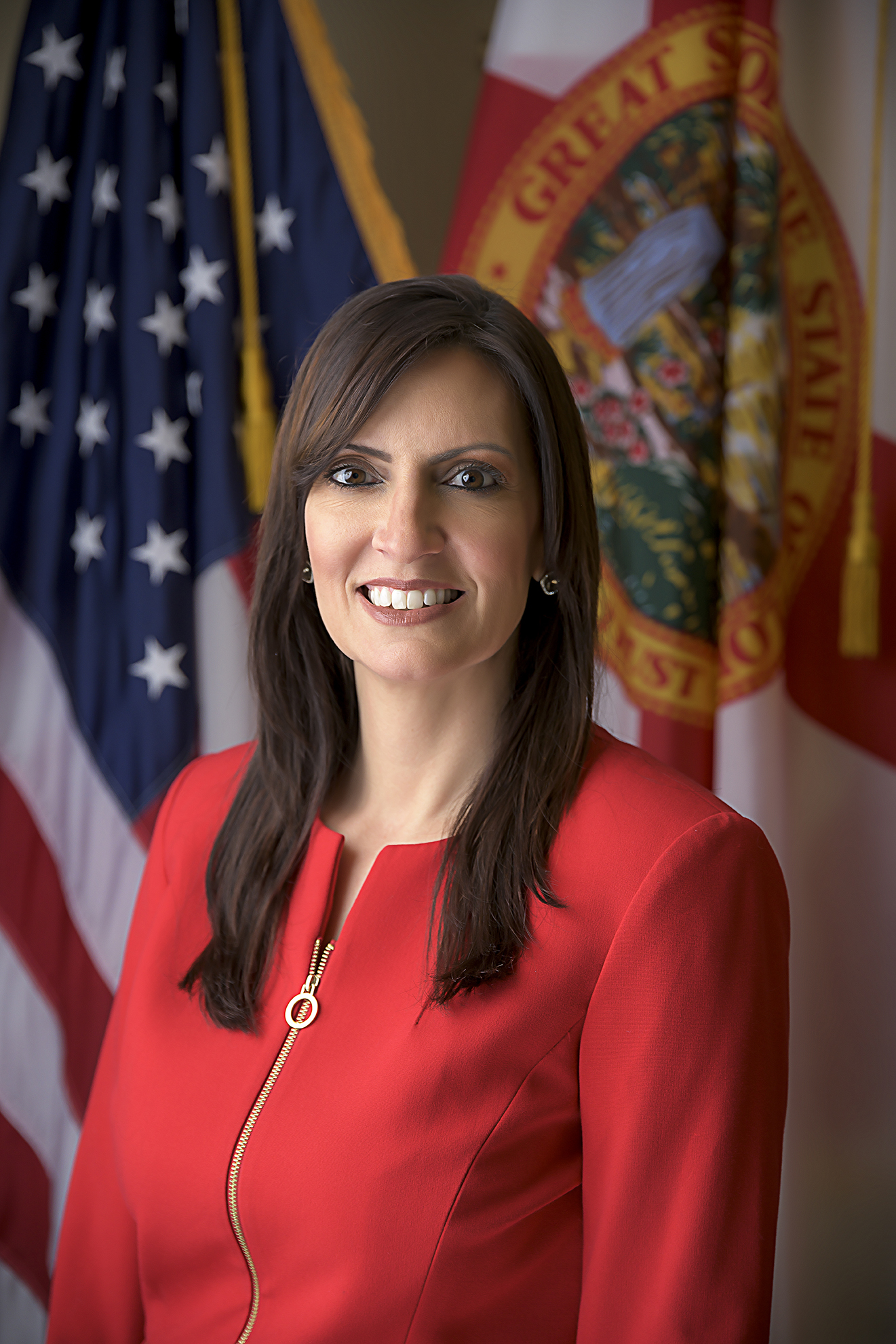
Jeanette Nuñez

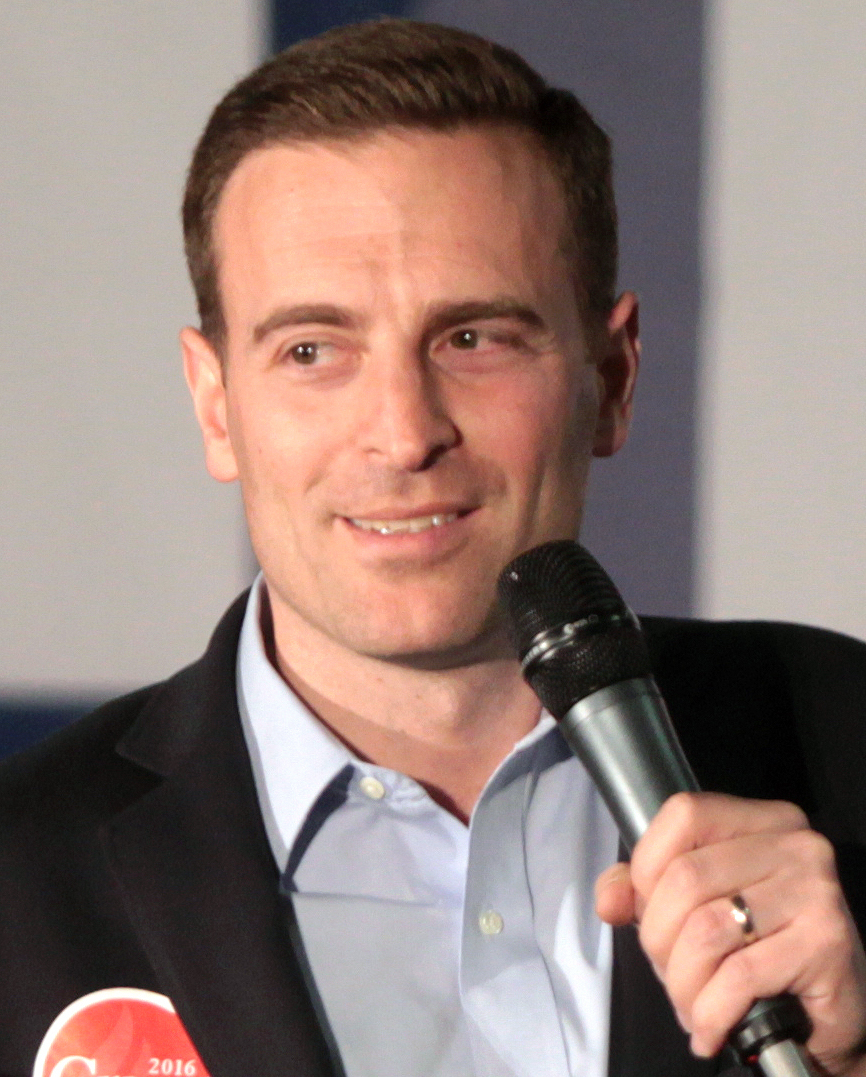
Adam Laxalt

=== Current ===
==== Governors ====
- Kim Reynolds, 43rd governor of Iowa (2017–present)
- Kevin Stitt, 28th governor of Oklahoma (2019–present)

==== Other ====
- Manny Díaz Jr., 28th education commissioner of Florida (2022–present)
- John Dougall, auditor of Utah (2013–present)
- Joseph Ladapo, surgeon general of Florida (2021–present)
- Andy Matthews, 23rd controller of Nevada (2023–present)
- Ashley Moody, 38th Florida attorney general (2019–present)
- Ryan Dean Newman, general counsel for Governor Ron DeSantis (2021–present)
- Jeanette Nuñez, 20th lieutenant governor of Florida (2019–present)
- Andrew Sorrell, auditor of Alabama (2023–present)

=== Former ===
- Frank Keating, 25th governor of Oklahoma (1995–2003), deputy secretary of housing and urban development (1992–1993), United States associate attorney general (1988–1990), U.S. attorney for the Northern District of Oklahoma (1981–1983), member of the Oklahoma Senate from the 38th district (1975–1981), and Member of the Oklahoma House of Representatives from the 70th district (1973–1975)
- Stephanie Kopelousos, secretary of the Florida Department of Transportation (2007–2011)
- Adam Laxalt, 33rd attorney general of Nevada (2015–2019)
- Cathy Zeuske, 9th secretary of the Wisconsin Department of Revenue (1996–2001), 31st state treasurer of Wisconsin (1991–1995), member of the Wisconsin State Assembly from the 4th district (1985–1991), and member of the Wisconsin State Assembly from the 54th district (1983–1985)

== State legislators ==
=== State senators ===
==== Arizona ====
- Ken Bennett, member of the Arizona Senate from the 1st district (2023–present)
- Frank Carroll, member of the Arizona Senate from the 28th district (2023–present)
- Jeff Dial, member of the Arizona Senate from the 18th district (2014–2017) and member of the Arizona House of Representatives (2010–2014)
- Eddie Farnsworth, president pro tempore of the Arizona Senate (2019–2021), Member of the Arizona Senate from the 12th district (2019–2021)
- Rick Gray, majority leader of the Arizona Senate (2019–2023), member of the Arizona Senate from the 21st district (2018–2023), member of the Arizona House of Representatives from the 21st district (2013–2017), and member of the Arizona House of Representatives from the 9th district (2011–2013)
- Steve Kaiser, member of the Arizona Senate from the 2nd district (2023) and member of the Arizona House of Representatives from the 15th District (2021–2023)
- Vince Leach, president pro tempore of the Arizona Senate (2021–2023), Member of the Arizona Senate from the 11th district (2019–2023), and Member of the Arizona House of Representatives from the 11th district (2013–2019)
- J. D. Mesnard, member of the Arizona Senate from the 13th district (2023–present)
- T. J. Shope, president pro tempore of the Arizona Senate (2023–present) and member of the Arizona Senate from the 16th district (2023–present)
- Steve Yarbrough, president of the Arizona Senate (2017–2019), member of the Arizona Senate from the 17th district (2013–2019), member of the Arizona Senate from the 21st district (2011–2013), and member of the Arizona House of Representatives from the 21st district (2003–2011)

==== Colorado ====
- Larry Liston, Colorado state senator from District 10 (2021–present); Colorado state representative from District 16 (2005–2013 and 2017–2021); vice chairman of the Colorado Republican Party (2001–2003)

==== Connecticut ====
- Scott Frantz, Connecticut state senator from District 36 (2009–2019)

==== Florida ====
- Ben Albritton, Florida state senator from District 27 (2022–present) and District 26 (2018–2022)
- Bryan Avila, Florida state senator from District 39 (2022–present); Florida state representative from District 111 (2014–2022); speaker pro tempore of the Florida House of Representatives (2020–2022); deputy majority whip of the Florida House of Representatives (2016–2018)
- Dennis Baxley, Florida state senator from District 13 (2022–present) and District 12 (2016–2022); Florida state representative from District 23 (2012–2016) and District 24 (2010–2012); president pro tempore of the Florida Senate (2022–present)
- Jim Boyd, Florida State Senator from District 20 (2022–present) and District 21 (2020–2022); Florida State Representative from District 71 (2012–2018) and District 68 (2010–2012)
- Jennifer Bradley, Florida state senator from District 6 (2022–present) and District 5 (2020–2022)
- Jason Brodeur, Florida state senator from District 10 (2022–present) and District 9 (2020–2022); Florida state representative from District 28 (2012–2018) and District 33 (2010–2012)
- Doug Broxson, Florida state senator from District 1 (2016–present); Florida State Representative from District 3 (2012–2016) and District 1 (2010–2012)
- Danny Burgess, Florida state senator from District 23 (2022–present) and District 20 (2020–2022); Florida state representative from District 38 (2014–2019)
- Locke Burt, Florida state senator from District 16 (1991–2002); majority leader of the Florida Senate (1996–1998); majority whip of the Florida Senate (1996)
- Colleen Burton, Florida state senator from District 12 (2022–present); Florida state representative from District 40 (2014–2022)
- Alexis Calatayud, Florida state senator from District 38 (2022–present)
- Jay Collins, Florida state senator from District 14 (2022–present)
- Nick DiCeglie, Florida state senator from District 18 (2022–present); Florida state representative from District 66 (2018–2022)
- Gayle Harrell, Florida state senator from District 31 (2022–present) and District 25 (2018–2022); Florida state representative from District 83 (2012–2018) and District 81 (2000–2008 and 2010–2012)
- Travis Hutson, Florida state senator from District 7 (2016–present) and District 6 (2015–2016); Florida state representative from District 24 (2012–2015)
- Blaise Ingoglia, Florida state senator from District 11 (2022–present); Florida state representative from District 35 (2014–2022); chairman of the Florida Republican Party (2015–2019)
- Jonathan Martin, Florida state senator from District 33 (2022–present)
- Kathleen Passidomo, Florida state senator from District 28; president of the Florida Senate (2022–present); majority leader of the Florida Senate (2018–2020); Florida state representative from District 106 (2012–2016) and District 76 (2010–2012) (switched endorsement to Trump after DeSantis withdrew)
- Keith Perry, Florida state senator from District 9 (2016–present)
- Corey Simon, Florida state senator from District 3 (2022–present)
- Jay Trumbull, Florida state senator from District 2 (2022–present); Florida state representative from District 6 (2014–2022)
- Tom Wright, Florida state senator from District 8 (2018–present) and District 14 (2014–2018)
- Clay Yarborough, Florida state senator from District 4 (2022–present); Florida state representative from District 12 (2016–2022); Jacksonville City councilman from District 1 (2007–2015); president of the Jacksonville City Council (2014–2015)

==== Illinois ====
- Sue Rezin, Illinois state senator from District 38 (2010–present); deputy minority leader of the Illinois Senate (2021–present); assistant minority leader of the Illinois Senate (2015–2021); Republican candidate for U.S. representative from IL-14 in 2020

==== Iowa ====
- Waylon Brown, Iowa state senator from District 30 (2023–present) and District 26 (2017–2023); majority whip of the Iowa Senate (2023–present); assistant majority leader of the Iowa Senate (2019–2023)
- Mark Chelgren, Iowa state senator from District 41 (2011–2019)
- Mark Costello, Iowa state senator from District 8 (2023–present) and District 12 (2015–2023); Iowa state representative from District 23 (2013–2014)
- Adrian Dickey, Iowa state senator from District 44 (2023–present) and District 41 (2021–2023)
- Tim Goodwin, Iowa state senator from District 44 (2021–2023)
- Jesse Green, Iowa state senator from District 24 (2021–present)
- Dennis Guth, Iowa state senator from District 28 (2023–present) and District 4 (2013–2023)
- Mike Klimesh, Iowa state senator from District 32 (2023–present) and District 28 (2021–2023); assistant majority leader of the Iowa Senate (2023–present); mayor of Spillville (2008–2020)
- Jeff Reichman, Iowa state senator from District 50 (2023–present) and District 42 (2021–2023); assistant majority leader of the Iowa Senate (2023–present) (previously endorsed Donald Trump)
- Dave Rowley, Iowa state senator from District 5 (2023–present) and District 1 (2022–2023)
- Ken Rozenboom, Iowa state senator from District 19 (2023–present) and District 40 (2013–2023); Mahaska County supervisor (2011–2013)
- Tom Shipley, Iowa state senator from District 9 (2023–present) and District 11 (2015–2023)
- Amy Sinclair, Iowa state senator from District 12 (2023–present) and District 14 (2013–2023); president of the Iowa Senate (2023–present)
- Jack Whitver, Iowa state senator from District 23 (2023–present), District 19 (2013–2023), and District 35 (2011–2013); majority leader of the Iowa Senate (2018–present); president of the Iowa Senate (2017–2018); minority whip of the Iowa Senate (2013–2017)
- Dan Zumbach, Iowa state senator from District 34 (2023–present) and District 48 (2013–2023); assistant majority leader of the Iowa Senate (2017–2021); assistant minority leader of the Iowa Senate (2015–2017)

==== Maine ====
- Brad Farrin, Maine state senator from District 3 (2018–present); Maine state representative from District 111 (2014–2018)

==== Massachusetts ====
- Peter Durant, Massachusetts state senator from the Worcester and Hampshire District (2023–present); Massachusetts state representative from Worcester District 6 (2011–2023)

==== Michigan ====
- Joe Bellino, Michigan state senator from District 16 (2023–present); Michigan state representative from District 17 (2017–2023)
- Dan Lauwers, Michigan state senator from District 25 (2019–present); Michigan state representative from District 81 (2013–2019); majority leader of the Michigan House of Representatives (2017–2019)Kevin Daley, Michigan state senator from District 26 (2023–present) and District 31 (2019–2023); Michigan state representative from District 82 (2009–2015); Arcadia Township supervisor (1995–1998); treasurer of Arcadia Township (1989–1995); Arcadia Township trustee (1985–1989)
- Aric Nesbitt, Michigan state senator from District 20 (2023–present) and District 26 (2019–2022); minority leader of the Michigan Senate (2023–present); president pro tempore of the Michigan Senate (2019–2023); commissioner of the Michigan Lottery (2017–2018); Michigan state representative from District 66 (2013–2017) and District 80 (2011–2013)
- Lana Theis, Michigan state senator from District 22 (2019–present); Michigan state representative from District 42 (2015–2019)
- Michael Webber, Michigan state senator from District 9 (2023–present); Michigan state representative from District 45 (2015–2021)

==== Mississippi ====
- Chris Caughman, Mississippi state senator from District 35 (2016–present)

==== Montana ====
- Daniel Zolnikov, Montana state senator from District 22 (2023–present)

==== Nevada ====
- Jeff Stone, Nevada state senator from District 20 (2022–present); western regional director of the U.S. Department of Labor (2019–2021); California state senator from District 28 (2014–2019); Riverside County supervisor from District 3 (2004–2014); chairman of the Riverside County Board of Supervisors (2014); Temecula city councilman (1992–2004)

==== New Hampshire ====
- Regina Birdsell, New Hampshire state senator from District 19 (2014–present); majority whip of the New Hampshire Senate (2022–present); New Hampshire state representative from Rockingham District 13 (2012–2014) and Rockingham District 8 (2010–2012)
- Harold French, New Hampshire state senator from District 7 (2016–2022); New Hampshire state representative from Merrimack District 2 (2014–2016); Republican nominee for New Hampshire executive councilman from District 2 in 2022
- Jim Rubens, New Hampshire state senator from District 5 (1994–1998); Republican candidate for U.S. senator from New Hampshire in 2014 and 2016 and governor of New Hampshire in 1998

==== North Carolina ====
- Danny Britt, North Carolina state senator from District 24 (2023–present) and District 13 (2017–2023)
- Jim Burgin, North Carolina state senator from District 12 (2019–present); Harnett County commissioner from District 3 (2008–2016)
- Bobby Hanig, North Carolina state senator from District 3 (2023–present) and District 1 (2022–2023); North Carolina state representative from District 6 (2019–2022); Currituck County Commissioner from District 2 (2016–2018)

==== Oklahoma ====
- Brent Howard, Oklahoma state senator from District 38 (2019–present)
- Chris Kidd, Oklahoma state senator from District 31 (2016–present)
- John Michael Montgomery, Oklahoma state senator from District 32 (2019–present); Oklahoma state representative from District 62 (2015–2019)
- Lonnie Paxton, Oklahoma state senator from District 23 (2016–present); assistant majority floor leader of the Oklahoma Senate (2021–present)
- Roland Pederson, Oklahoma state senator from District 19 (2016–present)

==== Pennsylvania ====
- Greg Rothman, Pennsylvania state senator from District 34 (2023–present); Pennsylvania state representative from District 87 (2015–2022)

==== South Carolina ====
- Josh Kimbrell, South Carolina state senator from District 11 (2020–present)
- Dwight Loftis, South Carolina state senator from District 6 (2019–present); South Carolina state representative from District 19 (1996–2019)
- Rex Rice, South Carolina state senator from District 2 (2016–present); South Carolina state representative from District 26 (1994–2010)
- Danny Verdin, South Carolina state senator from District 9 (2001–present)

==== Tennessee ====
- Richard Briggs, Tennessee state senator from District 7 (2015–present)
- J. Adam Lowe, Tennessee state senator from District 1 (2023–present)

==== Utah ====
- Stuart Adams, Utah state senator from District 7 (2023–present) and District 22 (2009–2023); president of the Utah Senate (2019–present); majority whip of the Utah Senate (2013–2018); chairman of the Utah Transportation Commission (2007–2009); Utah state representative from District 16 (2002–2006); Layton city councilman (1994–2002)
- Jake Anderegg, Utah state senator from District 22 (2023–present) and District 13 (2017–2023); Utah state representative from District 6 (2013–2017)
- Curt Bramble, Utah state senator from District 24 (2023–present) and District 16 (2001–2023); majority leader of the Utah Senate (2004–2008)
- Kirk Cullimore Jr., Utah state senator from District 19 (2023–present) and District 9 (2019–2023)
- Lincoln Fillmore, Utah state senator from District 17 (2023–present) and District 10 (2016–2023)
- Daniel McCay, Utah state senator from District 18 (2023–present) and District 11 (2019–2023); Utah state representative from District 41 (2013–2019) and District 52 (2012–2013); Republican candidate for lieutenant governor of Utah in 2020
- Derrin Owens, Utah state senator from District 27 (2023–present) and District 24 (2021–2023); Utah state representative from District 58 (2015–2020)
- Scott Sandall, Utah state senator from District 1 (2023–present) and District 17 (2019–2023); Utah state representative from District 1 (2015–2019)
- Todd Weiler, Utah state senator from District 8 (2023–present) and District 23 (2012–2023)

==== Washington ====
- Phil Fortunato, Washington state senator from District 31 (2017–present); Washington state representative from District 47 (1999–2001); Republican candidate for governor of Washington in 2020

==== Wisconsin ====
- Duey Stroebel, Wisconsin state senator from District 20 (2015–present); Wisconsin state assemblyman from District 60 (2011–2015); member of the Cedarburg School Board (2007–2012); Republican candidate for U.S. representative from WI-06 in 2014

==== Other ====
- Larry Stutts, member of the Alabama Senate from the 6th district (2014–present)

=== State representatives ===
==== Alabama ====
- David Faulkner, Alabama state representative from District 46 (2014–present)

==== Arizona ====
- Shawnna Bolick, Arizona state representative from District 20 (2019–2023); Republican candidate for Secretary of State of Arizona in 2022
- Regina Cobb, Arizona state representative from District 5 (2015–2023); Republican candidate for State Treasurer of Arizona in 2022
- David Cook, Arizona state representative from District 7 (2023–present) and District 8 (2017–2023)
- Lupe Diaz, Arizona state representative from District 19 (2023–present) and District 14 (2021–2023)
- Teresa Martinez, Arizona state representative from District 16 (2023–present) and District 11 (2021–2023); majority whip of the Arizona House of Representatives (2023–present)
- Kevin Payne, Arizona state representative from District 27 (2023–present) and District 21 (2017–2023)
- Beverly Pingerelli, Arizona state representative from District 28 (2023–present) and District 21 (2021–2023)
- Ben Toma, Arizona state representative from District 27 (2023–present) and District 22 (2017–2023); speaker of the Arizona House of Representatives (2023–present); majority leader of the Arizona House of Representatives (2021–2023)
- Jeff Weninger, Arizona state representative from District 17 (2015–2023); Chandler city councilman (2006–2015); vice mayor of Chandler (2012–2013); Republican candidate for State Treasurer of Arizona in 2022
- Justin Wilmeth, Arizona state representative from District 2 (2023–present) and District 15 (2021–2023)

==== Arkansas ====
- Zachary Gramlich, Arkansas state representative from District 50 (2023–present)
- Aaron Pilkington, Arkansas state representative from District 45 (2023–present) and District 69 (2017–2023)

==== California ====
- Heath Flora, California state assemblyman from District 9 (2022–present) and District 12 (2016–2022)
- Tom Lackey, California state assemblyman from District 34 (2014–present); Palmdale city councilman (2005–2014)
- Joe Patterson, California state assemblyman from District 5 (2022–present)

==== Florida ====
- Shane Abbott, Florida state representative from District 5 (2022–present)
- Thad Altman, Florida state representative from District 32 (2022–present), District 16 (2016–2022), and District 30 (2003–2008); Florida state senator from District 16 (2012–2016) and District 24 (2008–2012); Brevard County commissioner from District 5 (1984–1992)
- Danny Alvarez, Florida state representative from District 69 (2022–present)
- Adam Anderson, Florida state representative from District 57 (2022–present)
- Alex Andrade, Florida state representative from District 2 (2018–present)
- Doug Bankson, Florida state representative from District 39 (2022–present)
- Fabián Basabe, Florida state representative from District 106 (2022–present)
- Melony Bell, Florida state representative from District 49 (2022–present) and District 56 (2018–2022); Polk County commissioner from District 2 (2010–2018)
- Kim Berfield, Florida state representative from District 58 (2022–present) and District 50 (2000–2006)
- Adam Botana, Florida state representative from District 80 (2022–present) and District 76 (2020–2022)
- Robert Brackett, Florida state representative from District 34 (2022–present)
- Chuck Brannan, Florida state representative from District 10 (2018–present)
- James Buchanan, Florida state representative from District 74 (2018–present)
- Jennifer Canady, Florida state representative from District 50 (2022–present)
- Mike Caruso, Florida state representative from District 87 (2022–present) and District 89 (2018–2022)
- Ryan Chamberlin, Florida state representative from District 24 (2023–present)
- Linda Chaney, Florida state representative from District 61 (2022–present) and District 69 (2020–2022)
- Chuck Clemons, Florida state representative from District 22 (2022–present) and District 21 (2016–2022); speaker pro tempore of the Florida House of Representatives (2022–present)
- Fred Costello, Florida state representative from District 25 (2014–2016) and District 26 (2010–2012); mayor of Ormond Beach (2002–2010); Ormond Beach City Commissioner from Zone 3 (1999–2002); Republican candidate for U.S. representative from FL-06 in 2012, 2016, and 2018
- Travis Cummings, Florida state representative from District 18 (2012–2020); deputy majority whip of the Florida House of Representatives (2012–2014); Clay County commissioner (2008–2012); chairman of the Clay County Commission (2009–2011); Orange Park town councilman (2002–2008); mayor of Orange Park (2004–2005)
- Wyman Duggan, Florida state representative from District 15 (2018–present)
- Tiffany Esposito, Florida state representative from District 77 (2022–present)
- Tom Fabricio, Florida state representative from District 110 (2022–present) and District 103 (2020–2022)
- Sam Garrison, Florida state representative from District 11 (2020–present)
- Mike Giallombardo, Florida state representative from District 79 (2022–present) and District 77 (2020–2022)
- Karen Gonzalez Pittman, Florida state representative from District 65 (2022–present)
- Peggy Gossett-Seidman, Florida state representative from District 91 (2022–present)
- Michael Grant, Florida state representative from District 75 (2016–present) and District 71 (2004–2008); majority leader of the Florida House of Representatives (2020–present)
- Tommy Gregory, Florida state representative from District 72 (2022–present) and District 73 (2018–2022)
- Philip Griffitts, Florida state representative from District 6 (2022–present)
- Jeff Holcomb, Florida state representative from District 53 (2022–present)
- Berny Jacques, Florida state representative from District 59 (2022–present)
- Sam Killebrew, Florida state representative from District 48 (2022–present) and District 41 (2016–2022)
- Traci Koster, Florida state representative from District 66 (2022–present) and District 64 (2020–2022)
- Chip LaMarca, Florida state representative from District 100 (2022–present) and District 93 (2018–2022); Broward County commissioner from District 4 (2010–2018); Lighthouse Point city commissioner (2005–2010)
- Tom Leek, Florida state representative from District 28 (2022–present) and District 25 (2016–2022)
- Vicki Lopez, Florida state representative from District 113 (2022–present); Lee County commissioner (1990–1993)
- Randy Maggard, Florida state representative from District 54 (2022–present) and District 38 (2019–2022)
- Patt Maney, Florida state representative from District 4 (2020–present)
- Ralph Massullo, Florida state representative from District 23 (2022–present) and District 34 (2016–present)
- Stan McClain, Florida state representative from District 27 (2022–present) and District 23 (2016–2022)
- Lawrence McClure, Florida state representative from District 68 (2022–present) and District 58 (2017–2022)
- Fiona McFarland, Florida state representative from District 73 (2022–present) and District 72 (2020–2022)
- Lauren Melo, Florida state representative from District 82 (2022–present) and District 80 (2020–2022)
- Kiyan Michael, Florida state representative from District 16 (2022–present)
- Jim Mooney, Florida state representative from District 120 (2020–present); Islamorada village councilman (1998–2002 and 2014–2020); mayor of Islamorada (2000 and 2017); vice mayor of Islamorada (2016)
- José Oliva, Florida state representative from District 110 (2011–2020); speaker of the Florida House of Representatives (2018–2020); Housing Commissioner of Hialeah (2001–2005)
- Toby Overdorf, Florida state representative from District 85 (2022–present) and District 83 (2018–2022)
- Bobby Payne, Florida state representative from District 20 (2022–present) and District 19 (2016–2022)
- Daniel Perez, Florida state representative from District 116 (2017–present) (switched endorsement to Trump after DeSantis withdrew)
- Jenna Persons-Mulicka, Florida state representative from District 78 (2020–present)
- Rachel Plakon, Florida state representative from District 36 (2022–present)
- Paul Renner, Florida state representative from District 19 (2022–present) and District 24 (2015–2022); speaker of the Florida House of Representatives (2022–present) (switched endorsement to Trump after DeSantis withdrew)
- Alex Rizo, Florida State Representative from District 112 (2022–present) and District 110 (2020–2022)
- Spencer Roach, Florida state representative from District 76 (2022–present) and District 79 (2018–2022)
- Will Robinson, Florida state representative from District 71 (2018–present)
- Bob Rommel, Florida state representative from District 81 (2022–present) and District 106 (2016–2022)
- Joel Rudman, Florida state representative from District 3 (2022–present)
- Michelle Salzman, Florida state representative from District 1 (2020–present)
- Jason Shoaf, Florida state representative from District 7 (2019–present)
- Tyler Sirois, Florida state representative from District 31 (2022–present) and District 51 (2018–2022)
- David Smith, Florida state representative from District 38 (2022–present) and District 28 (2016–2022)
- John Snyder, Florida state representative from District 86 (2022–present) and District 82 (2020–2022)
- Cyndi Stevenson, Florida state representative from District 18 (2022–present) and District 17 (2015–2022)
- John Temple, Florida state representative from District 52 (2022–present)
- Josie Tomkow, Florida state representative from District 51 (2022–present) and District 39 (2018–2022)
- Dana Trabulsy, Florida state representative from District 84 (2020–present)
- Chase Tramont, Florida state representative from District 30 (2022–present)
- Keith Truenow, Florida state representative from District 26 (2022–present) and District 31 (2020–2022)
- Kaylee Tuck, Florida state representative from District 83 (2022–present) and District 55 (2020–2022)
- Taylor Yarkosky, Florida state representative from District 25 (2022–present)
- Brad Yeager, Florida state representative from District 56 (2022–present)

==== Georgia ====
- Jodi Lott, Georgia state representative from District 131 (2023–present) and District 122 (2015–2023); governor's floor leader of the Georgia House of Representatives (2019–2023)

==== Indiana ====
- Bob Heaton, Indiana state representative from District 46 (2010–present)
- Chris Jeter, Indiana state representative from District 88 (2020–present)
- Shane Lindauer, Indiana state representative from District 63 (2017–present)

==== Iowa ====
- Clel Baudler, Iowa state representative from District 20 (2013–2019), District 58 (2003–2013), and District 78 (1999–2003)
- Brian Best, Iowa state representative from District 11 (2023–present) and District 12 (2015–2023)
- Ken Carlson, Iowa state representative from District 13 (2023–present)
- Taylor Collins, Iowa state representative from District 95 (2023–present)
- Tom Determann, Iowa state representative from District 69 (2023–present)
- Dave Deyoe, Iowa state representative from District 51 (2023–present), District 49 (2013–2023), and District 10 (2007–2013); assistant majority leader of the Iowa House of Representatives (2011–2013); assistant minority leader of the Iowa House of Representatives (2009–2011)
- Jon Dunwell, Iowa state representative from District 38 (2023–present) and District 29 (2021–2023); assistant majority leader of the Iowa House of Representatives (2023–present)
- Dean Fisher, Iowa state representative from District 53 (2023–present) and District 72 (2013–2023); Indian Village Township Clerk (2008–2013)
- Dan Gehlbach, Iowa state representative from District 46 (2023–present)
- Bill Gustoff, Iowa state representative from District 40 (2023–present)
- Robert Henderson, Iowa state representative from District 2 (2023–present)
- ~~Steven Holt, Iowa state representative from District 12 (2023–present) and District 18 (2015–2023)~~ (switched endorsement to Vivek Ramaswamy)
- Tom Jeneary, Iowa state representative from District 3 (2023–present) and District 5 (2019–2023)
- Joshua Meggers, Iowa state representative from District 54 (2023–present)
- Ann Meyer, Iowa state representative from District 8 (2023–present) and District 9 (2019–2023)
- Norlin Mommsen, Iowa state representative from District 70 (2023–present) and District 97 (2015–2023)
- Tom Moore, Iowa state representative from District 18 (2023–present) and District 21 (2015–2023)
- Carter Nordman, Iowa state representative from District 47 (2023–present) and District 19 (2021–2023)
- Ross Paustian, Iowa state representative from District 92 (2015–2023) and District 84 (2011–2013)
- Matt Rinker, Iowa state representative from District 99 (2023–present)
- Tom Sands, Iowa state representative from District 88 (2013–2017) and District 87 (2003–2013); Columbus Junction city councilman (1996–2002); finance chairman of the Columbus Junction City Council (1996–2002); Concord Township Trustee (1985–1989)
- David Sieck, Iowa state representative from District 16 (2023–present) and District 23 (2015–2023)
- Brent Siegrist, Iowa state representative from District 19 (2023–present), District 16 (2021–2023), District 84 (1993–2003), and District 99 (1985–1993); assistant majority leader of the Iowa House of Representatives (2021–present); speaker of the Iowa House of Representatives (1999–2003); majority leader of the Iowa House of Representatives (1993–1999); Republican candidate for U.S. representative from IA-05 in 2002
- Henry Stone, Iowa state representative from District 9 (2023–present) and District 7 (2021–2023); majority whip of the Iowa House of Representatives (2021–present)
- Phil Thompson, Iowa state representative from District 48 (2023–present) and District 47 (2019–2023)
- Guy Vander Linden, Iowa state representative from District 79 (2013–2019) and District 75 (2011–2013)
- Mike Vondran, Iowa state representative from District 94 (2023–present)
- Skyler Wheeler, Iowa state representative from District 4 (2017–present)
- John Wills, Iowa state representative from District 10 (2023–present) and District 1 (2015–2023); speaker pro tempore of the Iowa House of Representatives (2020–present); majority whip of the Iowa House of Representatives (2019); assistant majority leader of the Iowa House of Representatives (2015–2019)
- Hans Wilz, Iowa state representative from District 25 (2023–present)
- Matt Windschitl, Iowa state representative from District 15 (2023–present), District 17 (2013–2023), and District 56 (2007–2013); majority leader of the Iowa House of Representatives (2020–present); speaker pro tempore of the Iowa House of Representatives (2014–2020); assistant majority leader of the Iowa House of Representatives (2011–2014); assistant minority leader of the Iowa House of Representatives (2009–2011)
- Devon Wood, Iowa state representative from District 17 (2023–present)

==== Kansas ====
- Brett Fairchild, Kansas state representative from District 113 (2021–present)
- Susan Humphries, Kansas state representative from District 99 (2017–present)
- Sandy Pickert, Kansas state representative from District 88 (2023–present)
- Kristey Williams, Kansas state representative from District 77 (2015–present); majority caucus chairwoman of the Kansas House of Representatives (2023–present); mayor of Augusta (2007–2014)

==== Michigan ====
- Tom Leonard, Michigan state representative from District 93 (2013–2019); speaker of the Michigan House of Representatives (2017–2019); Republican nominee for attorney general of Michigan in 2018
- Bryan Posthumus, Michigan state representative from District 90 (2023–present) and District 73 (2021–2022); minority floor leader of the Michigan House of Representatives (2023–present)
- Rocky Raczkowski, Michigan state representative from District 37 (1997–2002); majority leader of the Michigan House of Representatives (1999–2000); Republican nominee for U.S. representative from MI-09 in 2010 and U.S. senator from Michigan in 2002

==== Minnesota ====
- Elliott Engen, Minnesota state representative from District 36A (2023–present)

==== Mississippi ====
- Fred Shanks, Mississippi state representative from District 60 (2018–present); Brandon city alderman from Ward 2 (2009–2013)

==== New Hampshire ====
- Marc Abear, New Hampshire state representative from Belknap District 2 (2016–2018)
- Tim Baxter, New Hampshire state representative from Rockingham District 20 (2020–2022); Republican candidate for U.S. representative from NH-01 in 2022
- JD Bernardy, New Hampshire state representative from Rockingham District 36 (2022–present) and Rockingham District 16 (2020–2022)
- Ross Berry, New Hampshire state representative from Hillsborough District 44 (2020–present); executive director of the New Hampshire Republican State Committee (2015–2017)
- Melissa Blasek, New Hampshire state representative from Hillsborough District 21 (2020–2022)
- Ralph Boehm, New Hampshire state representative from Hillsborough District 14 (2022–present), Hillsborough District 20 (2012–2016, 2018–2022), and Hillsborough District 27 (2004–2006 and 2008–2012); assistant majority leader of the New Hampshire House of Representatives (2021–2022)
- Linda Camarota, New Hampshire state representative from Hillsborough District 7 (2018–2020)
- Brian Cole, New Hampshire state representative from Hillsborough District 26 (2022–present) (previously endorsed Donald Trump)
- Tim Comerford, New Hampshire state representative from Rockingham District 33 (2008–2014)
- James Connor, New Hampshire state representative from Strafford District 19 (2022–present)
- Debra DeSimone, New Hampshire state representative from Rockingham District 18 (2022–present), Rockingham District 14 (2012–2022), and Rockingham District 6 (2008–2012) (previously endorsed Donald Trump)
- Tom Dolan, New Hampshire state representative from Rockingham District 16 (2022–present) and Rockingham District 5 (2018–2022)
- Jess Edwards, New Hampshire state representative from Rockingham District 31 (2022–present) and Rockingham District 4 (2016–2022)
- Oliver Ford, New Hampshire state representative from and Rockingham District 3 (2022–present) and Rockingham District 4 (2020–2022)
- Joe Guthrie, New Hampshire state representative from Rockingham District 15 (2022–present, 1996–1998), Rockingham District 13 (2014–2022) and Rockingham District 8 (2006–2008)
- Michael Harrington, New Hampshire state representative from Strafford District 18 (2022–present) and Strafford District 3 (2000–2004, 2016–2022); assistant majority leader of the New Hampshire House of Representatives (2021–2022); New Hampshire public utilities commissioner (2004–2013)
- Katelyn Kuttab, New Hampshire state representative from Rockingham District 17 (2022–present)
- Rick Ladd, New Hampshire state representative from Grafton District 5 (2008–2012, 2022–present) and Grafton District 4 (2012–2022)
- Jay Lucas, New Hampshire state representative from Sullivan District 6 (1974–1978); Republican nominee for governor of New Hampshire in 1998
- Bob Lynn, New Hampshire state representative from Rockingham District 17 (2022–present) and Rockingham District 7 (2020–2022); chief justice of the New Hampshire Supreme Court (2018–2019); associate justice of the New Hampshire Supreme Court (2010–2018)
- Maureen Mooney, New Hampshire state representative from Hillsborough District 12 (2022–present), Hillsborough District 21 (2020–present), and Hillsborough District 19 (2002–2008); assistant majority whip of the New Hampshire House of Representatives (2021–2022); assistant minority whip of the New Hampshire House of Representatives (2007–2008)
- Jeanine Notter, New Hampshire state representative from Hillsborough District 12 (2022–present), Hillsborough District 21 (2012–2022), and Hillsborough District 9 (2010–2012); majority whip of the New Hampshire House of Representatives (2021–present)
- Katherine Prudhomme O'Brien, New Hampshire state representative from Rockingham District 13 (2022–present) and Rockingham District 6 (2014–2016, 2018–2022)
- Travis O'Hara, New Hampshire state representative from Belknap District 4 (2022–present) and Belknap District 9 (2020–2022)
- Bill Ohm, New Hampshire state representative from Hillsborough District 36 (2014–2018) and Hillsborough District 26 (2010–2012)
- Jason Osborne, New Hampshire state representative from Rockingham District 2 (2022–present) and Rockingham District 4 (2014–2022); majority leader of the New Hampshire House of Representatives (2020–present)
- Mark Pearson, New Hampshire state representative from Rockingham District 34 (2016–present)
- Kristine Perez, New Hampshire state representative from Rockingham District 16 (2022–present) (previously endorsed Donald Trump)
- Daniel Popovici-Muller, New Hampshire state representative from Rockingham District 17 (2022–present); finance director of Windham (2015–2022)
- Kelley Potenza, New Hampshire state representative from Strafford District 19 (2022–present)
- Matthew Simon, New Hampshire state representative from Grafton District 1 (2022–present) and Grafton District 14 (2020–2022)
- James Spillane, New Hampshire state representative from Rockingham District 2 (2014–present) (previously endorsed Donald Trump)
- Walter Spilsbury, Sullivan District 3 (2022–present) and Sullivan District 8 (2020–2022)
- Joe Sweeney, New Hampshire state representative from Rockingham District 25 (2022–present) and Rockingham District 8 (2012–2016); vice chairman of the Salem Town Council (2023–present); executive director of the New Hampshire Republican State Committee (2021–2022)
- Jordan Ulery, New Hampshire state representative from Hillsborough District 13 (2022–present), Hillsborough District 37 (2012–2022), and Hillsborough District (2004–2012) (previously endorsed Donald Trump)
- Michael Vose, New Hampshire state representative from Rockingham District 5 (2022–present) and Rockingham District 9 (2014–2018 and 2019–2022)
- Michael Yakubovich, New Hampshire state representative from Merrimack District 24 (2018–2022)

==== New Jersey ====
- Rick Merkt, New Jersey state assemblyman from District 25 (1998–2010); minority parliamentarian of the New Jersey General Assembly (2006–2010); New Hampshire Republican State committeeman (2019–2023); Mendham Borough administrator (2014–2017); Mendham Township committeeman (2011–2014); mayor of Mendham Township (2013); deputy mayor of Mendham Township (2012); Republican candidate for governor of New Jersey in 2009

==== North Carolina ====
- Jennifer Balkcom, North Carolina state representative from District 117 (2023–present)
- John Bell, North Carolina state representative from District 10 (2013–present); majority leader of the North Carolina House of Representatives (2016–present); majority whip of the North Carolina House of Representatives (2014–2016)
- Allen Chesser, North Carolina state representative from District 25 (2023–present)
- Kevin Crutchfield, North Carolina state representative from District 83 (2023–present)
- Ken Fontenot, North Carolina state representative from District 24 (2023–present)
- Keith Kidwell, North Carolina state representative from District 79 (2019–present)
- Jarrod Lowery, North Carolina state representative from District 47 (2023–present); Lumbee tribal councilman for District 5 (2015–2021)
- Jeff McNeely, North Carolina state representative from District 84 (2019–present)
- Dennis Riddell, North Carolina state representative from District 64 (2013–present)
- Steve Ross, North Carolina state representative from District 63 (2013–2021 and 2023–present); Burlington city councilman (1997–2003 and 2009–2013); mayor of Burlington (2003–2007); chairman of the Piedmont Triad Council of Governments (1975–1976)
- Jason Saine, North Carolina state representative from District 97 (2011–present)
- Wayne Sasser, North Carolina state representative from District 67 (2019–present)
- Sam Watford, North Carolina state representative from District 80 (2015–2019 and 2021–present)
- David Willis, North Carolina state representative from District 68 (2021–present)
- Matthew Winslow, North Carolina state representative from District 7 (2021–present)

==== Ohio ====
- Adam Mathews, Ohio state representative from District 56 (2023–present)

==== Oklahoma ====
- Nick Archer, Oklahoma state representative from District 55 (2022–present); mayor of Elk City (2019–2022)
- Chad Caldwell, Oklahoma state representative from District 40 (2014–present)
- Trey Caldwell, Oklahoma state representative from District 63 (2019–present); deputy majority leader of the Oklahoma House of Representatives (2021–present)
- Jon Echols, Oklahoma state representative from District 90 (2012–present); majority floor leader of the Oklahoma House of Representatives (2017–present)
- Neil Hays, Oklahoma state representative from District 13 (2022–present)
- Chris Kannady, Oklahoma state representative from District 91 (2014–present)
- Dell Kerbs, Oklahoma state representative from District 26 (2016–present)
- Mark Lepak, Oklahoma state representative from District 9 (2014–present)
- Ryan Martinez, Oklahoma state representative from District 39 (2016–present)
- Anthony Moore, Oklahoma state representative from District 57 (2020–present)
- Terry O'Donnell, Oklahoma state representative from District 23 (2013–present); speaker pro tempore of the Oklahoma House of Representatives (2021–2022); majority whip of the Oklahoma House of Representatives (2017–2020)
- Mike Osburn, Oklahoma state representative from District 81 (2016–present)
- John Pfeiffer, Oklahoma state representative from District 38 (2014–present); deputy majority floor leader of the Oklahoma House of Representatives (2019–present)
- Chris Sneed, Oklahoma state representative from District 14 (2018–present)
- Josh West, Oklahoma state representative from District 5 (2017–present); majority leader of the Oklahoma House of Representatives (2019–present)

==== Rhode Island ====
- Brian Newberry, Rhode Island state representative from District 48 (2009–present); minority leader of the Rhode Island House of Representatives (2011–2017); minority whip of the Rhode Island House of Representatives (2011)

==== South Carolina ====
- Todd Atwater, South Carolina state representative from District 87 (2010–2018); Republican candidate for attorney general of South Carolina in 2018
- Lin Bennett, South Carolina state representative from District 114 (2016–2022)
- Gary Brewer, South Carolina state representative from District 114 (2022–present)
- Joe Bustos, South Carolina state representative from District 112 (2020–present)
- Micah Caskey, South Carolina state representative from District 89 (2017–present)
- Brandon Guffey, South Carolina state representative from District 48 (2023–present)
- Bill Herbkersman, South Carolina state representative from District 118 (2002–present)
- Bill Hixon, South Carolina state representative from District 83 (2010–present)
- Steven Long, South Carolina state representative from District 37 (2016–present)
- Sandy McGarry, South Carolina state representative from District 44 (2020–2022)
- Travis Moore, South Carolina state representative from District 33 (2020–present)
- Dennis Moss, South Carolina state representative from District 29 (2007–present)
- Chris Murphy, South Carolina state representative from District 98 (2010–present)
- Roger Nutt, South Carolina state representative from District 34 (2020–present); Spartanburg County Councilman from District 6 (2010–2020)
- Bill Taylor, South Carolina state representative from District 86 (2010–present)
- Ashley Trantham, South Carolina state representative from District 28 (2018–present)

==== Tennessee ====
- Gino Bulso, Tennessee state representative from District 61 (2023–present)
- Dale Carr, Tennessee state representative from District 12 (2012–present); Sevierville city alderman (2008–2012)
- Ryan Williams, Tennessee state representative from District 42 (2011–present); majority caucus chairman of the Tennessee House of Representatives (2016–2019)
- Jason Zachary, Tennessee state representative from District 14 (2015–present); Republican candidate for U.S. representative from TN-02 in 2014

==== Texas ====
- Matt Schaefer, Texas state representative from District 6 (2013–present)

==== Utah ====
- Melissa Garff Ballard, Utah state representative from District 20 (2019–present)
- Kera Birkeland, Utah state representative from District 4 (2023–present) and District 53 (2020–2023)
- Brady Brammer, Utah state representative from District 54 (2023–present) and District 27 (2019–2023)
- Walt Brooks, Utah state representative from District 75 (2016–present)
- Jefferson Burton, Utah state representative from District 64 (2023–present) and District 66 (2021–2023)
- Kay Christofferson, Utah state representative from District 53 (2023–present) and District 56 (2013–2023)
- Paul Cutler, Utah state representative from District 18 (2023–present); mayor of Centerville (2014–2018); Centerville city councilman (2004–2011)
- Stephanie Gricius, Utah state representative from District 50 (2023–present); Eagle Mountain city councilwoman (2015–2020)
- Timothy Hawkes, Utah state representative from District 18 (2015–2022)
- Marsha Judkins, Utah state representative from District 61 (2018–present); member of the Provo City School District Board of Education (2013–2017)
- Jon Hawkins, Utah state representative from District 55 (2023–present) and District 57 (2019–2023)
- Ken Ivory, Utah state representative from District 39 (2023–present) and District 47 (2011–2019 and 2021–2023)
- Dan Johnson, Utah state representative from District 3 (2023–present) and District 4 (2019–2023)
- Karianne Lisonbee, Utah state representative from District 14 (2017–present)
- Jefferson Moss, Utah state representative from District 51 (2023–present) and District 2 (2017–2023); majority whip of the Utah House of Representatives (2021–present); member of the Utah State Board of Education (2013–2016); planning coordinator of Saratoga Springs (2012); Saratoga Springs city councilman (2003–2006)
- Karen M. Peterson, Utah state representative from District 13 (2022–present); Clinton City Councilwoman (2013–2020)
- Candice Pierucci, Utah state representative from District 49 (2023–present) and District 52 (2019–2023)
- Susan Pulsipher, Utah state representative from District 45 (2023–present) and District 50 (2017–2023)
- Mike Schultz, Utah state representative from District 12 (2015–present); majority leader of the Utah House of Representatives (2021–present)
- Casey Snider, Utah state representative from District 5 (2019–present)
- Robert Spendlove, Utah state representative from District 42 (2023–present) and District 49 (2014–2023)
- Jeff Stenquist, Utah state representative from District 46 (2023–present) and District 51 (2019–2023); Draper city councilman (2005–2017)
- Keven Stratton, Utah state representative from District 58 (2023–present), District 48 (2013–2023), and District 58 (2012–2013)
- Jordan Teuscher, Utah state representative from District 44 (2023–present) and District 42 (2021–2023)
- Raymond Ward, Utah state representative from District 19 (2015–present)
- Christine Watkins, Utah state representative from District 67 (2023–present) and District 69 (2009–2012 and 2017–2023)
- Doug Welton, Utah state representative from District 65 (2023–present) and District 67 (2021–2023)
- Ryan Wilcox, Utah state representative from District 7 (2009–2014 and 2021–present)

==== Washington ====
- Chris Corry, Washington state representative from District 14 (2019–present); assistant minority floor leader of the Washington House of Representatives (2021–present)

==== Wisconsin ====
- John Gard, Wisconsin state assemblyman from District 89 (1993–2007) and District 88 (1987–1993); speaker of the Wisconsin State Assembly (2003–2007); Republican nominee for U.S. representative from WI-08 in 2006 and 2008

== State judicial officials ==
=== Current ===
- Phil Berger Jr., associate justice of the North Carolina Supreme Court (2021–present); judge of the North Carolina Court of Appeals (2017–2020); district attorney of Rockingham County (2007–2014)

=== Former ===
- Alan Lawson, associate justice of the Supreme Court of Florida (2016–2022); judge of the Florida Fifth District Court of Appeal (2005–2016); chief judge of the Florida Fifth District Court of Appeal (2015–2016); judge of the Ninth Judicial Circuit of Florida (2002–2005)

== Local officials ==
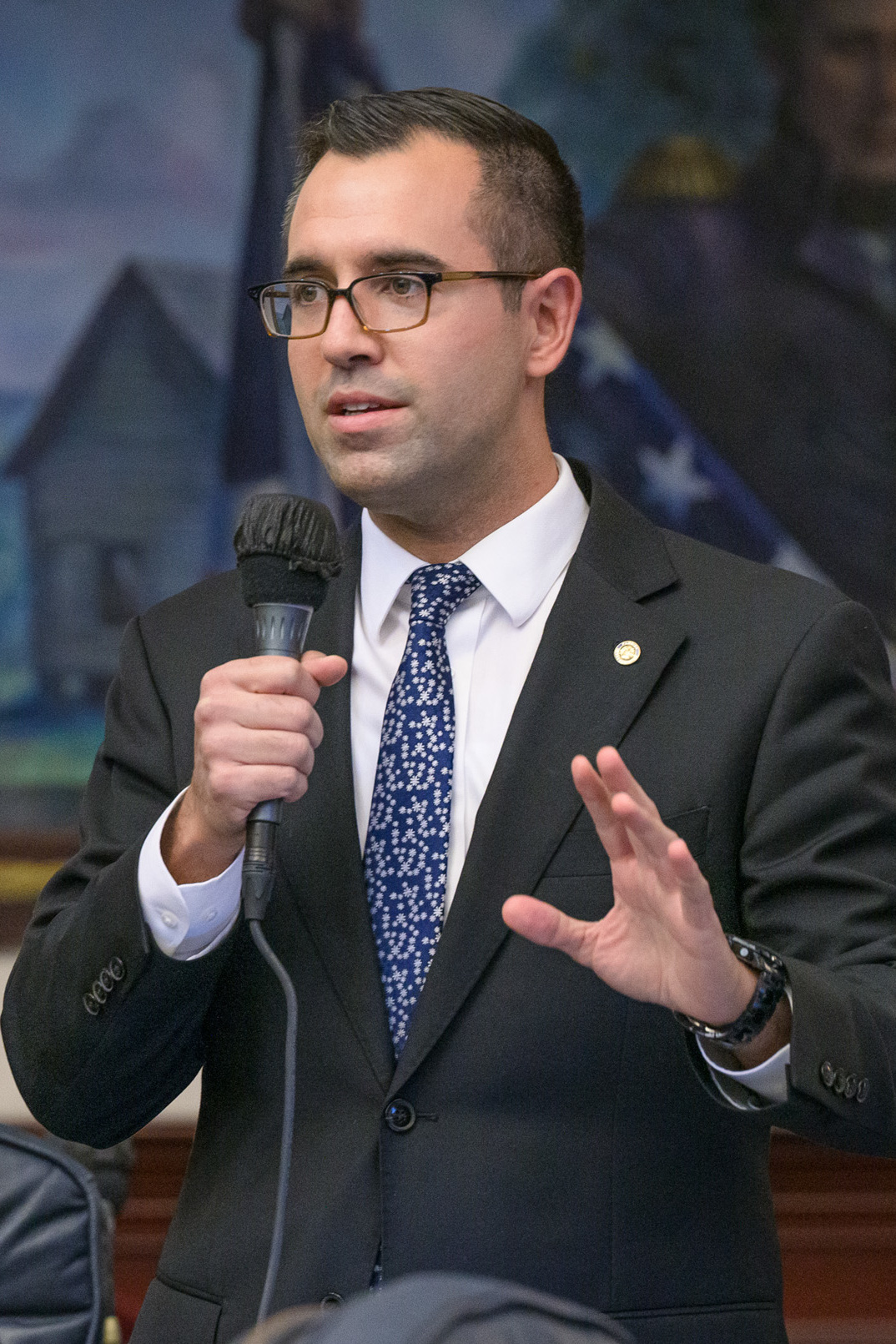
Juan Fernandez-Barquin

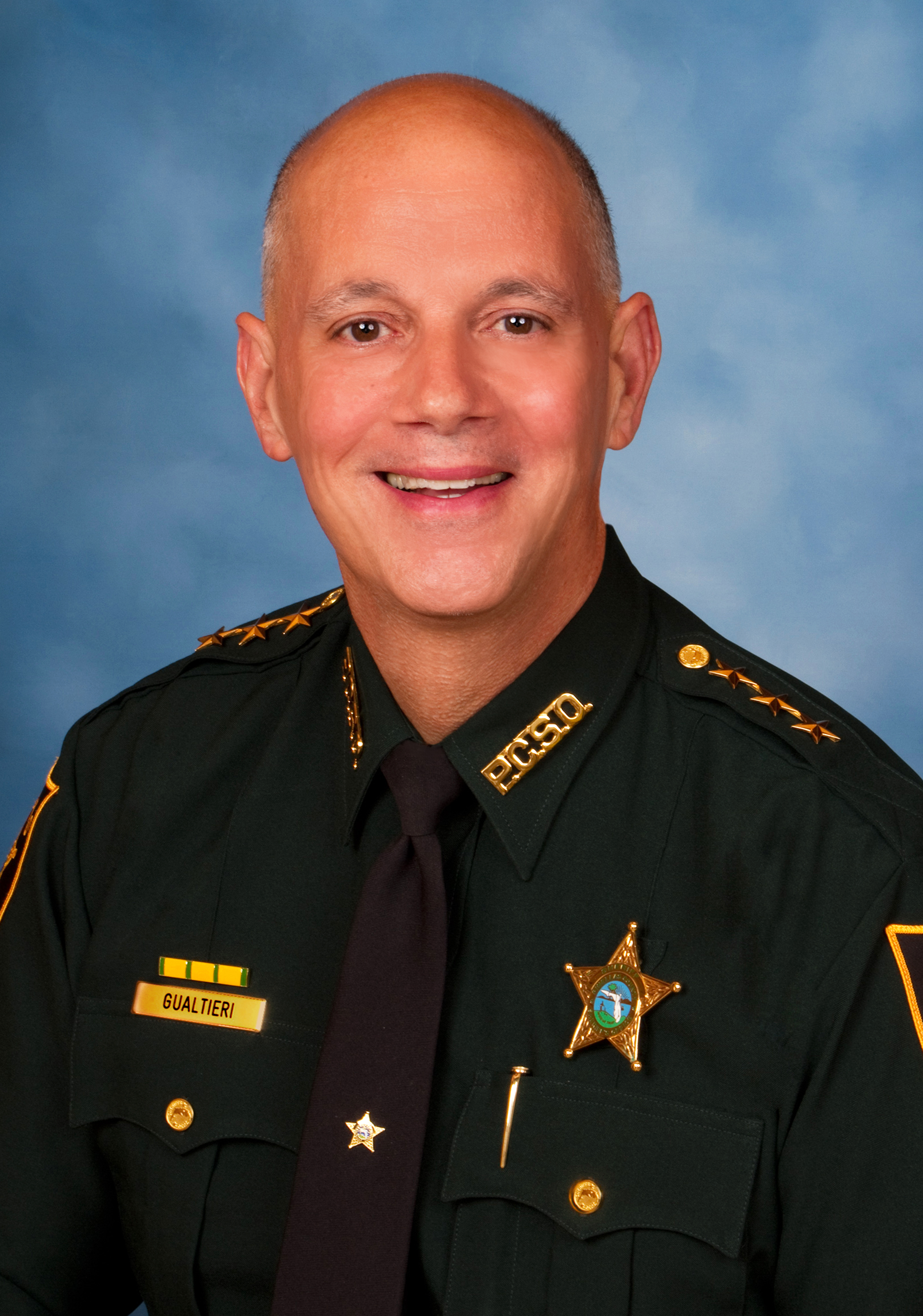
Bob Gualtieri

=== Current ===
- Reagan Dunn, King County councilman from District 9 (2005–present); vice chairman of the King County Council (2016–present); Republican candidate for U.S. representative from WA-04 in 2022 and Republican nominee for attorney general of Washington in 2012
- Juan Fernandez-Barquin, clerk of the court and comptroller of Miami-Dade County (2023–present); Florida state representative from District 118 (2022–2023) and District 119 (2018–2022)
- Bob Gualtieri, sheriff of Pinellas County (2011–present); president of the Florida Sheriffs Association (2019–2020)
- Grady Judd, sheriff of Polk County (2005–present); president of the Florida Sheriffs Association (2013–2014)
- Jonathan Lines, Yuma County supervisor from District 2 (2021–present); chairman of the Arizona Republican Party (2017–2019)
- Dick Muri, mayor of Steilacoom (2021–present); Washington state representative from District 28 (2013–2019); Pierce County councilman from District 6 (2003–2012); Republican nominee for U.S. representative from WA-09 in 2010 and WA-10 in 2012
- Will O'Neill, Newport Beach councilman from District 7 (2016–2024); mayor pro tempore of Newport Beach (2023–present); mayor of Newport Beach (2019-2020, 2023-2024); member of the San Joaquin Hills Transportation Corridor Agency Board of Directors (2019–present); chairman of the San Joaquin Hills Transportation Corridor Agency Board of Directors (2022–present)
- William Snyder, sheriff of Martin County (2013–present); Florida state representative from District 82 (2006–2012)
- Aimee Winder Newton, Salt Lake County councilwoman from District 3 (2014–present); Republican candidate for governor of Utah in 2020
- Morris Young, sheriff of Gadsden County (2004–present) (Democrat)

== Party officials ==
=== Former ===
- Phil Cox, executive director of the Republican Governors Association (2011–2014)
- Susan Hutchison, chairwoman of the Washington State Republican Party (2013–2018); Republican nominee for U.S. senator from Washington in 2018 and candidate for King County executive in 2009
- Terry Lathan, chairwoman of the Alabama Republican Party (2015–2021)
- Chuck Muth, executive director of the Nevada Republican Party (1995–1996)

== Other officials ==
- Ayaan Hirsi Ali, member of the Dutch House of Representatives (2003–2006) (People's Party for Freedom and Democracy)

== Business leaders ==
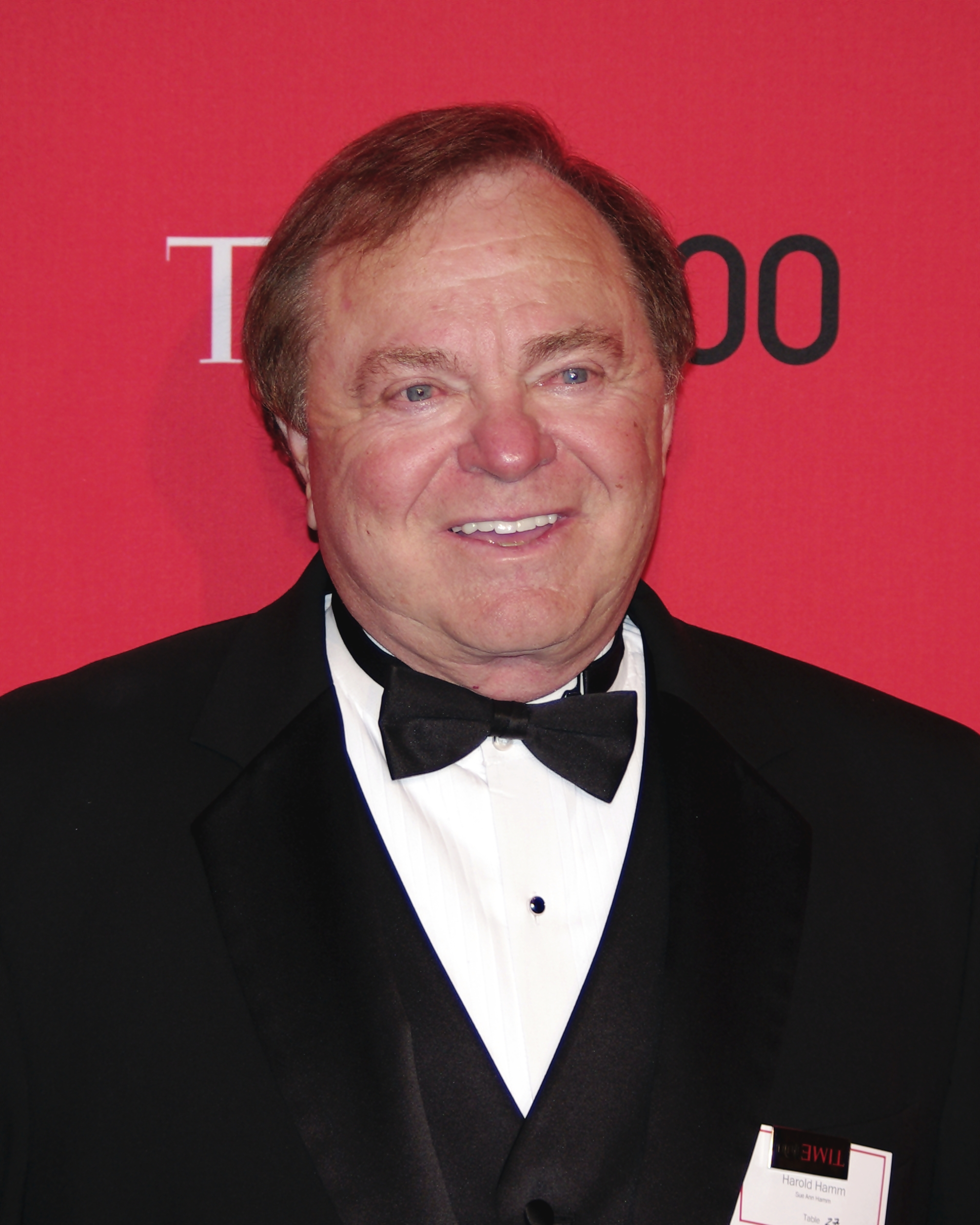
Harold Hamm

- Jay Adair, CEO of Copart
- David J. Blumberg, founder of Blumberg Capital
- John D'Arrigo, CEO, president, and chairman of D'Arrigo California
- Harold Hamm, founder and chairman of Continental Resources (co-endorsed with Nikki Haley)
- Cordia Harrington, founder, owner, and CEO of Crown Bakeries
- Emil Henry, U.S. assistant secretary of the treasury for financial institutions (2005–2007)
- Hal Lambert, founder of Point Bridge Capital
- R. Brad Martin, former CEO and executive chairman of Saks and former Tennessee state representative from District 94 (1973–1983)
- Geoff Rehnert, co-founder and co-CEO of Audax Group and former managing director of Bain Capital
- G. Brint Ryan, founder, CEO, and chairman of Ryan Tax Firm
- Joseph Semprevivo, founder, president, and CEO of Joseph's Lite Cookies
- Bruce Taylor, founder, CEO, and chairman of Taylor Fresh Foods
- Kenny Troutt, founder of Excel Communications and owner of WinStar Farm (co-endorsed with Donald Trump)
- Elizabeth Uihlein, co-founder, owner, and president of Uline`
- Richard Uihlein, co-founder and owner of Uline

== Activists and public figures ==
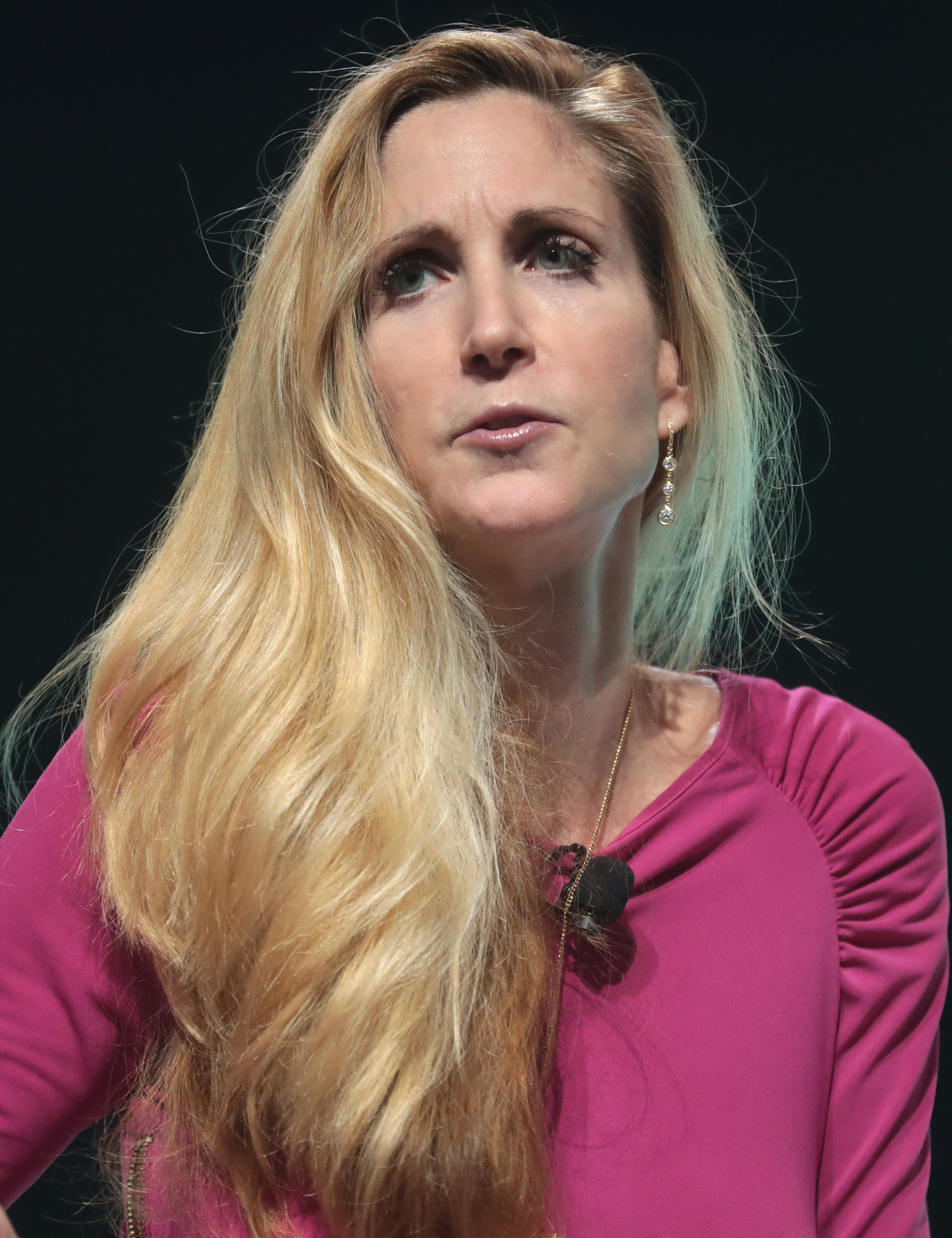
Ann Coulter

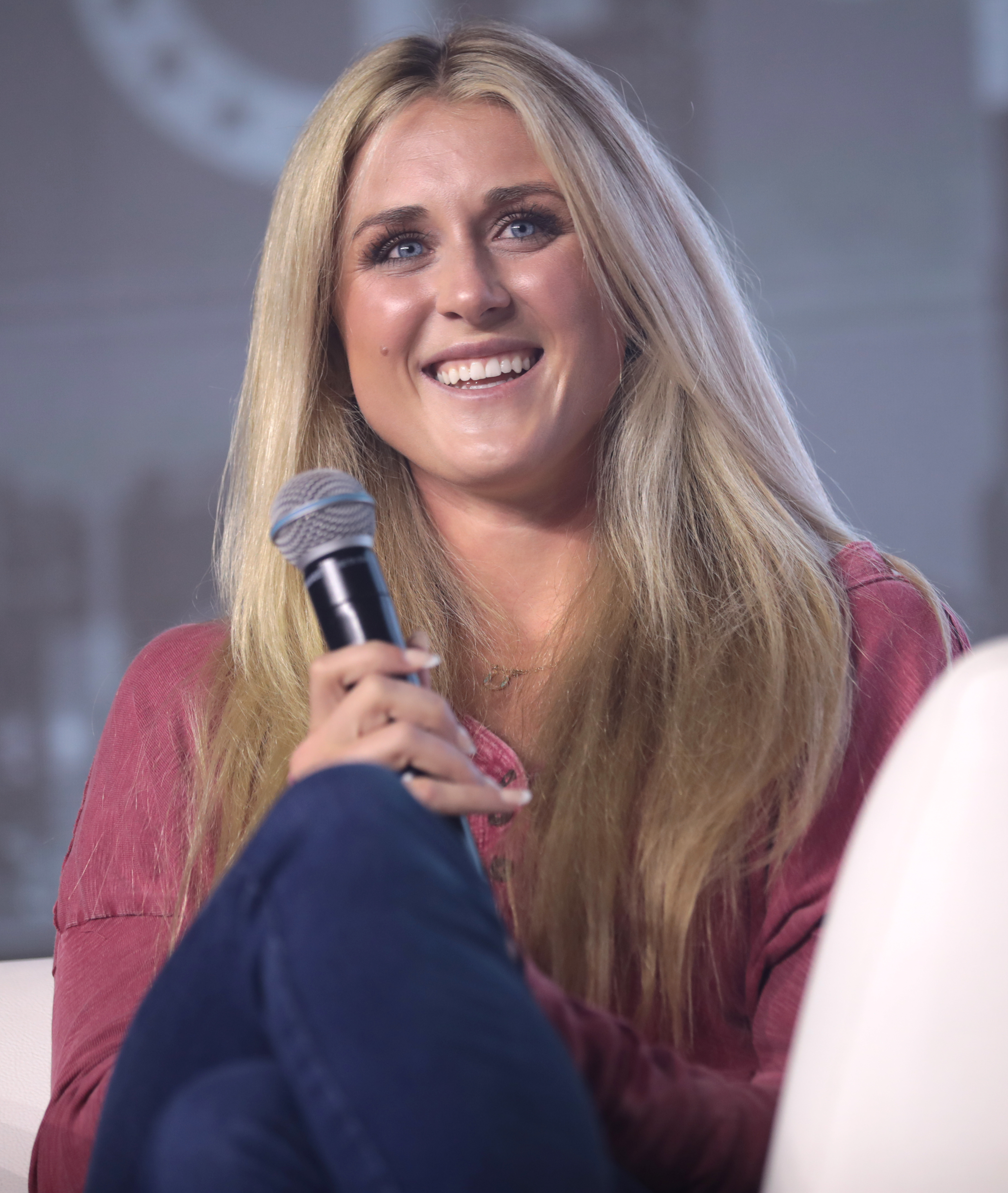
Riley Gaines

- Tom Ascol, senior pastor at Grace Baptist Church and president of Founders Ministries
- Ann Coulter, conservative columnist and author
- Tim Dawson, television writer, political activist, and journalist
- Steve Deace, conservative political commentator, activist, and author
- Casey DeSantis, first lady of Florida (2019–present) (his wife)
- Ben Domenech, conservative political commentator and co-founder of The Federalist
- Rod Dreher, conservative writer and editor-at-large of The American Conservative (American Solidarity Party)
- Riley Gaines, competitive swimmer
- Allister Heath, journalist, author, and editor of The Sunday Telegraph
- Scott Jennings, deputy White House director of political affairs (2005–2007); special assistant to the U.S. president (2005–2007)
- Abby Johnson, pro-life activist
- Tomi Lahren, conservative political commentator
- Brandi Love, pornographic actress
- Piers Morgan, journalist and host of Piers Morgan Uncensored (2022–present)
- Douglas Murray, conservative columnist, author, and founder of the Centre for Social Cohesion
- Keith Naughton, Republican political consultant (co-endorsed with Tim Scott)
- Sam Nunberg, political consultant and advisor to Donald Trump's 2016 presidential campaign
- Brendan O'Neill, columnist, author, and former editor of Spiked
- Star Parker, conservative columnist, activist, and author
- Liz Peek, conservative political commentator and business analyst
- Christina Pushaw, press secretary to the governor of Florida (2021–2022)
- Jeff Roe, Republican political consultant and founder of Axiom Strategies
- Dave Rubin, conservative political commentator, co-founder of Locals, and host of The Rubin Report (2013–present)
- Ben Shapiro, conservative political commentator, co-founder and editor-at-large of The Daily Wire, and host of The Ben Shapiro Show (2015–present) (switched endorsement to Trump after DeSantis withdrew)
- Lionel Shriver, novelist and journalist (Democratic Party)
- David Strom, conservative political commentator and talk radio host
- John Stuper, former baseball coach and retired baseball player
- Michele Tafoya, political advisor and former sports broadcaster
- Bob Vander Plaats, president and CEO of The Family Leader, Republican nominee for lieutenant governor of Iowa in 2006, and Republican candidate for governor of Iowa in 2002, 2006, and 2010

== Academic figures ==
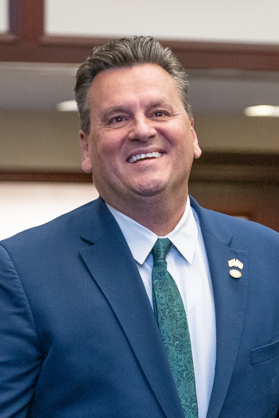
Fred Hawkins

- Fred Hawkins, president of South Florida State College (2023–present), former Florida state representative from District 35 (2022–2023) and District 42 (2020–2022), former Osceola County commissioner from District 5 (2008–2020), and former chairman of the Osceola County Commission (2010, 2014, and 2016)
- Eric Kaufmann, professor of politics at Birkbeck, University of London
- Everett Piper, former president of Oklahoma Wesleyan University (2002–2019)
- Andrew Tettenborn, professor of law at Swansea University's Hillary Rodham Clinton School of Law

== Organizations ==
- Florida Police Benevolent Association
- Tampa Bay Young Republicans

== See also ==
- Endorsements in the 2024 Republican Party presidential primaries
