= Iwobi =

- Gender: male
- Language: Igbo

Origin
- Origin: Nigeria
- Region of origin: South East Nigeria

Iwobi audio is Nigerian name of Igbo origin. Notable people with the surname include:

- Alex Iwobi (born 1996), Nigerian professional footballer
- Toni Iwobi (born 1955), Nigerian born Italian politician
- Uzo Iwobi (born 1969), Nigerian born Welsh academic
