= Point Bridge =

Point Bridge can refer to:

- Point Bridge (Pittsburgh), a steel cantilever truss bridge that spanned the Monongahela River in Pittsburgh, Pennsylvania
- PointBridge, an IT consulting company
- Dames Point Bridge, a cable-stayed bridge over the St. Johns River in Jacksonville, Florida
- The West Point Bridge Design Contest, a competition for middle school and high school students organized by the United States Military Academy
- Point Bridge Capital, an investment company known for "MAGA ETF"
