= Andrew Tettenborn =

British legal academic

- Occupation: Professor

Academic background
- Education: University of Cambridge

Academic work
- Discipline: Law
- Sub-discipline: Commercial law and the common law
- Institutions: Swansea University's Hillary Rodham Clinton School of Law

Andrew Tettenborn is a British legal academic and writer who is a professor of law at Swansea University's Hillary Rodham Clinton School of Law, specialising in commercial law and the common law.

== Education ==
Tettenborn was educated at Bryanston School and Peterhouse, Cambridge, where he completed an MA and an LLB. At Cambridge, he won academic prizes in law.

== Career ==
Prior to 1996, he was a lecturer in law at the University of Cambridge and a fellow of Pembroke College. In 1996, he left Cambridge and was appointed Bracton Professor of Law at the University of Exeter, and in 2010 Tettenborn left Exeter to join Swansea's Hillary Rodham Clinton School of Law. He previously taught at the Universities of Nottingham, Melbourne, Connecticut and the Case Western Reserve University School of Law.

=== Political commentary ===
In addition to academic work, he is politically active. He is a member of the Free Speech Union and was UKIP's candidate in the 2001 general election for the Bath constituency, coming last of five candidates with 708 votes (1.5%). In 2021, he wrote in The Times in defence of then Justice Secretary Dominic Raab's plan to remove the European Convention of Human Rights from UK law and replace it with a British Bill of Rights, which would provide the same protections, saying it would provide more democratic legitimacy than jurisprudence emanating from the European Court of Human Rights and human rights academics.

He signed an open letter in The Sunday Times in support of Kathleen Stock in 2021, following criticism from students and academics regarding her being awarded an OBE while holding gender critical views. He also writes for The Spectator and The Critic.

In 2022, following the capture by Russian forces of British-born Ukrainian soldiers Aiden Aslin and Shaun Pinner during the Russian invasion of Ukraine, Tettenborn commented that the statement Aslin and Pinner were fighting illegally in the country – by Northern Ireland Secretary Brandon Lewis and Shadow Attorney General Emily Thornberry – could be used by Russian forces to justify an atrocity against the soldiers. Tettenborn said that it was incorrect as a matter of international law to say the two were fighting in the country illegally. Later, the Prime Minister's spokesperson said that the British government does not consider the pair to have being fighting illegally in the war.

Tettenborn wrote commentaries on human rights- and immigration issues for The Spectator. He argued in several of his contributions in 2025 that Britain should leave the ECHR.

In July 2024, shortly before the Court of Appeal ruled the sentences "manifestly excessive", Tettenborn wrote that the "Just Stop Oil fanatics deserve their lengthy jail terms".

== Publications ==
Tettenborn is the co-editor of Clerk & Lindsell on Torts. He is also on the editorial boards of Lloyd's Maritime and Commercial Law Quarterly and the Journal of International Maritime Law.
