= Uzo Iwobi =

Nigerian academic

Uzo Iwobi CBE FLSW
- Born: 7 February 1969 (age 57); Nigeria
- Education: University of Nigeria
- Occupation: Lecturer
- Board member of: Race Council Cymru, CLPW Academi Wales, University of Wales Trinity St David
- Spouse: Andrew Ubaka Iwobi (m. 1991)
- Children: 2

Uzoamaka Linda Iwobi CBE FLSW (// /ɪˈwoʊbi/ ih-WOH-bee born 7 February 1969) is a British-Nigerian solicitor and equalities practitioner. She is the former Specialist Policy Adviser on Equalities to the Welsh Government, an Honorary Fellow at the University of Wales Trinity St David and founder, secretary and former chief executive officer at Race Council Cymru. She is also Vice President of the Royal Welsh College of Music & Drama.

== Early life in Nigeria ==
Iwobi was born in Nigeria. She studied at the University of Nigeria between 1987 and 1991 where she graduated with a law degree. She met married Andrew Ubaka Iwobi in 1989 and on 28 October 1991 they were married at the Lagos State Registry in Lagos. She then went on to become a qualified solicitor and barrister, and was called to the Nigerian Bar. She then joined Andrew in the UK.

== Professional life in Wales ==
Still only 23, Iwobi arrived in Wales where she had her church wedding on 12 April 1993. When Iwobi arrived in Wales she worked as a lecturer in law at the Swansea Law School for 9 years. In 2002 she became the Principal Equality Diversity Chairperson of the African Community Centre in Wales, which she founded. Iwobi served with the Police National Diversity team, based at the Home Office in London, in which she was involved in national policy creation on race relations and diversity. By 2007 she had successfully completed the MSc in Business Management at the University of Glamorgan.

In 2006 she was appointed a Commissioner for the Commission for Racial Equality until it merged with the Equality and Human Rights Commission in October 2007. By 2009 she had become Director Of Operations at Ofuobi Equality and Diversity Consultancy. In 2010 she became part-time Chief Executive Office at Race Council Cymru and also passed the Institute of Leadership and Management's Executive Coaching level 7. Between 2013 and 2016 Iwobi was a Trustee for the British Red Cross and a year later she became Vice Chairperson of the Black History Association Wales, and a year after that she became Trustee / Governor at the UWC Atlantic College until 2016.

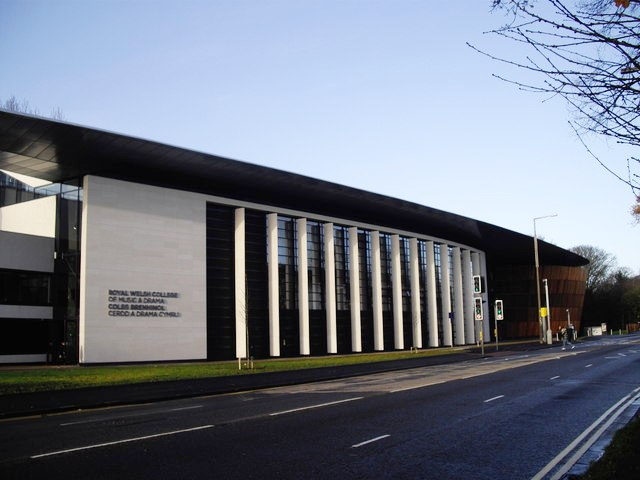
Royal Welsh College of Music & Drama

More recently she became the first International Chair of Diversity at the Royal Welsh College of Music & Drama in November 2018. In January 2019 she became Commissioner to the Centenary Commission on Adult Education at Balliol College until February 2020. She also became Specialist Adviser on Equalities to the Welsh Government also in 2019. Professor Iwobi holds the Postgraduate Certificate in Education from University of Wales Swansea and in May 2022 she was appointed as Vice President of the Royal Welsh College of Music & Drama.

== Honours and awards ==
Iwobi was appointed Officer of the Order of the British Empire (OBE) in the 2008 Birthday Honours for services to community race relations and South Wales communities and Commander of the Order of the British Empire (CBE) in the 2022 Birthday Honours for services to racial equality and championing diversity and inclusion.

She has also been awarded the following:

- 2006: Swansea Bay Woman of the Year (Community Achievement) Award
- 2017: Ethnic Minority Welsh Women's Achievement Award (EMWWAA) for Management and Leadership
- 2018: 100 list of Black, Brilliant and Welsh Africans by Wales Online
- 2019: Honorary Fellowship by the University of Wales Trinity Saint David
- 2019: Awarded Outstanding Developer and Mentor for Young People by NWAMI (North Wales Association of Multicultural Integration)
- 2020: WEN (Women's Equality Network) Wales' 100 Welsh Women list
- 2021: Received a BAPIO Award for her contributions to Equality and Diversity in Wales
- 2022: Fellowship of the Learned Society of Wales
