= G. Brint Ryan =

American tax consultant

- Born: George Brinton Ryan
- Education: University of North Texas
- Occupations: Chairman, CEO
- Known for: Founder, Ryan LLC
- Spouse: Amanda Sutton
- Children: 5

George Brinton "Brint" Ryan, or G. Brint Ryan, is an American tax consultant and entrepreneur. His firm, Ryan LLC, is based in Dallas. Ryan is the chairman and chief executive officer of Ryan LLC, which advises companies on tax matters. As of 2022, the company was the largest indirect tax and property tax practice in North America and the seventh largest corporate tax company in the United States, with annual revenues of over $700 million.

== Early life and education ==
Ryan was born George Brinton Ryan in Big Spring, Texas. He is a seventh-generation Irish American and his ancestors fought in the American Revolutionary War. His first job was a newspaper carrier for the Big Spring Herald. He also worked at Safeway Inc. sacking groceries. He received his bachelor's and master's degrees in accounting with an emphasis in taxation from the University of North Texas. He was inducted into the Pi Kappa Alpha fraternity in 1983. Ryan became house corporation president of the Epsilon Delta Chapter at the University of North Texas.

== Career ==
=== Ryan LLC ===
Ryan worked at Coopers & Lybrand, now PricewaterhouseCoopers, as a public accountant in 1989. He founded Ryan LLC as a CPA firm in 1991. By the end of 1997, Ryan had helped to grow the company to 75 employees, added new offerings, and increased the number of clients outside of Texas. By 2010, the company had grown to 42 locations across North America and the United Kingdom and recovered nearly $1.5 billion for its clients.

While CEO and chairman of Ryan LLC, he has received numerous awards. In 2011, Ryan was named one of Texas Monthly's 25 Most Powerful Texans. Irish America honored him on its Business 100 list for Irish-American leaders in 2013 and 2015. In 2014, he won a Stevie award for Executive of the Year in Accounting. In 2017, Ryan received the Wings of Eagles Presidential Award from the University of North Texas for his impact on the University. That same year, he was also ranked number 44 in the Glassdoor Highest Rated CEO's Employee Choice Rankings for a large company, and was included in the Dallas 500 list of most powerful business leaders in Dallas by D Magazine, and Irish America's Wall Street 50 list. In 2018, Ryan was named as one of Dallas Business Journal's Most Admired CEOs in North Texas.

In 2019, Ryan was selected for membership to the Horatio Alger Association of Distinguished Americans, Inc. That same year, he was also named to the 2020 Dallas 500 List of Most Influential Business Leaders by D CEO Magazine.

In 2021, Ryan was recognized by Glassdoor as the second highest rated CEO during the COVID-19 Pandemic. In 2022, Ryan was named to D CEO’s 2022 Dallas 500 List. This annual publication profiles the most influential business, civic, and nonprofit leaders in North Texas from a wide range spectrum of industries. In that same year, Ryan received the inaugural Career Achievement Award at the 2022 Dallas Business Journal Most Admired CEO’s event for his professional and civic achievements.

As of 2022, Ryan LLC has 113 locations, which includes operations in Singapore, Australia, Canada, India, the Netherlands, the Philippines, the United Kingdom and others, with an annual revenue of over $700 million.

=== Settles Hotel Development Company ===
Ryan formed the Settles Hotel Development Company in 2006. He purchased the Settles Hotel in Big Spring, Texas for $75,000 and restored it. The restoration took six years and $30 million, opening in December 2012. Ryan used old photographs and blueprints to closely replicate the original design of the 15-story hotel. He also purchased four city blocks in Big Spring, including the Ritz movie theatre on Main Street and an old bus depot. Ryan is also involved in the planned restoration of the Baker Hotel in Mineral Wells, Texas.

=== Board appointments ===
Ryan is on the executive committee of the board of directors of the Texas Association of Business, and the Texas Taxpayers and Research Association. He is a member of the American Institute of Certified Public Accountants, the Institute for Professionals in Taxation, the Texas Society of Certified Public Accountants, and the Dallas Citizens Council. He is on the affiliate board of the Blue Cross Blue Shield of Texas, the Junior League of Dallas Community Advisory Board, and the American Heart Association Board of Directors. He was appointed to the Taxpayer Advisory Group by Texas Comptroller of Public Accounts, Susan Combs. Ryan is the vice president of the Pi Kappa Alpha Foundation. Ryan was on the advisory council for Habitat for Humanity in Dallas and Dream Dallas.

Ryan was a contributing editor to the Guidebook to Texas Taxes in 2013. He was appointed to the Texas legislature commission examining state economic development efforts by Lieutenant Governor David Dewhurst.

He was appointed to the University of North Texas Board of Regents by Governor Rick Perry in 2009. Ryan has been chairman of the Board of Regents since 2013, and was reappointed to the position in 2015 by Governor Greg Abbott for a term expiring in 2021. Under his Chairmanship, the UNT Board of Regents unanimously approved a partnership between the UNT Health Science Center and Texas Christian University in 2015 to form a new medical degree program in Fort Worth. Ryan oversaw the selection of UNT Chancellor Lesa Roe in 2017 following the announced retirement of UNT Chancellor Lee F. Jackson. In 2022, UNT Dallas dedicated the new Ryan Tower following a $2 million donation from Amanda and Brint.

In 2015, Ryan was appointed to the Tax Policy Advisory Board by Lieutenant Governor Dan Patrick.

In April 2020, Lieutenant Governor Dan Patrick appointed a business task force to bolster the economy in Texas, with Ryan appointed to chair the task force.

== Politics ==
From 2000 through 2014, Ryan supported various political campaigns totaling more than $5 million, donating approximately $2.5 million to the Ryan Texas PAC, which has supported Texas politicians since 2000 and raised over $4.5 million towards their campaigns.

Ryan co-founded a political action committee supporting Rick Perry's bid for the Republican presidential nomination in 2012. Ryan was chief fund-raiser for Governor Perry's presidential PAC. He also is finance chairman for all three super PACs supporting Perry's bid for the 2016 GOP presidential nomination which raised nearly $17 million. He and his wife have contributed over $4 million to state officials and political causes. He also belonged to the group TexasOne, which recommended companies for the governor to recruit for relocation to Texas.

In 2015, Ryan was one of 56 business leaders selected by Lieutenant Governor Dan Patrick to provide recommendations to the Texas Legislature. As part of the selection, Ryan was named chairman of his Tax Policy Advisory Board.

In 2016, Ryan contributed more than $83,000 to the Republican National Committee. During his presidential campaign, Donald Trump invited Ryan to advise him on tax policy. In October 2017, Ryan helped to organize an event for the Kuehne Speaker Series that brought Donald Trump Jr. to the University of North Texas.

In November 2017, it was reported that Ryan be the campaign treasurer for Lisa Luby Ryan's campaign for the Texas House of Representatives.

In April 2020, Lieutenant Governor Dan Patrick appointed a business task force to bolster the economy in Texas, with Ryan appointed to chair the task force.

== Philanthropy ==
Ryan is a Garnet and Gold Donor for the Pi Kappa Alpha fraternity. He has donated over three million dollars to the University of North Texas including one million to the athletic department, and was the first member of the UNT Dallas Founders Circle. Ryan donated $1 million to Dallas Habitat for Humanity. He and his wife support the Amanda and G. Brint Ryan “Leaders of Tomorrow” scholarship for the University. Ryan is funding the majority of a private-public park project in Big Spring, Texas between the Hotel Settles and the Big Spring City Auditorium. In December 2017, Ryan and his wife donated $300,000 to the Museum of the American Railroad to fund a permanent model train exhibit.

In February 2019, Ryan and his wife Amanda donated $30 million to the University of North Texas, the largest gift in university history. The donation will help develop the G. Brint Ryan College of Business, which will provide ongoing support for business research through academic endowments, as well as funds to support strategic program initiatives to ensure the college is one of the nation's top providers of business higher education.

In April 2019, The Ryan Foundation acted as a benefactor for the West Texas Centers, helping the mental health and intellectual developmental disability center build its new administrative headquarters in Big Spring, Texas. The new building will be known as the Amanda and G. Brint Ryan Center. This investment in WTC allows the relocation of the facility and its services into a new, state-of-the-art building with more than 15,000 square feet along 4th Street, between Johnson Street and Nolan Street.

== Personal life ==
Ryan is married to the former Amanda Sutton. They have five daughters and live in Dallas, Texas. Ryan is an executive producer of a film about life in the West Texas oilfields in the late 1930s, The Iron Orchard. The film is based on a book of the same title by Tom Pendleton.
