= Cordia Harrington =

- Born: 1953 (age 71–72); Waco, Texas, U.S.
- Education: University of Arkansas (B.S.)
- Occupations: Entrepreneur, business executive
- Known for: Founder and CEO of The Bakery Companies
- Spouse: Tom Harrington
- Children: 3

Cordia Harrington (born 1953, Waco, Texas) is an American entrepreneur and business executive, best known as the founder and chief executive officer of The Bakery Companies, an industrial baking group supplying major restaurant and food brands in the United States.

== Early life and education ==
Harrington was born in 1953 in Waco, Texas. Her father worked as a salesman and her mother was a homemaker. During her childhood, the family relocated several times, living in Buffalo, New York, and St. Louis, Missouri. She displayed early entrepreneurial initiative, reportedly organizing informal childcare services in her neighbourhood at a young age. Harrington later attended the University of Arkansas, where she worked part time to support herself and graduated in 1975 with a degree in home economics, becoming the first member of her family to earn a college degree.

== Career ==
Harrington began her career in real estate, opening a brokerage firm in Arkansas in 1981 during a period of high interest rates. In 1990, she acquired her first McDonald’s franchise, later expanding to three locations. Through her work as a franchisee, she became involved in McDonald’s supplier networks and, in 1993, joined the company’s bun committee, gaining exposure to the global bakery supply chain.

In 1996, Harrington sold her McDonald’s franchises and founded the Tennessee Bun Company, which opened its first production facility in Dickson, Tennessee, in 1997 to supply hamburger buns to McDonald’s restaurants. Despite early financial difficulties linked to declining fast-food sales, the company diversified its customer base, adding clients such as Pepperidge Farm and later expanding into additional baked goods and foodservice markets. The business subsequently rebranded as The Bakery Companies to reflect its broader product range. In September 2019, Harrington sold a majority stake in the company to the private equity firm Arbor Investments, while remaining CEO and a minority shareholder.

She established the Bun Lady Scholarship which is awarded annually to entrepreneurship undergraduate or graduate students who are participating in Belmont University’s study abroad programs.

== Recognition ==
She was named number 16 of the 25 Top Women Business Builders by FAST Company. She was also named Woman Business Owner of the Year in 2000 by the National Association of Women Business Owners, and named number 16 in FAST Company magazine’s Fastest Growing Woman-Owned Business list in 2004. In 2007, she was named as Executive of the Year at the Excellence in Manufacturing Awards, and that same year she was named Chi Omega’s Malinda Jolley Mortin Woman of Achievement. The Bun Companies were also named in the 2007 list of the “Top 100 WBEs Impacting Supplier Diversity,” and that same year Nashville Bun Company was honored by a visit from then-President George W. Bush. In 2012 she was awarded the Beta Gamma Sigma Medallion for Entrepreneurship.

== Affiliations ==
She is a member of the Minnie Pearl Cancer Foundation, Leadership Nashville, Committee of 200, Chi Omega Foundation, the St. Thomas Health Services Fund and the Federal Reserve Bank of Atlanta Board, and is involved with Ronald McDonald House Charities.
