= Ryan LLC =

Tax services and consulting firm

- Formerly: Ryan & Company
- Industry: Consulting, tax services
- Founded: 1991
- Headquarters: Dallas, Texas
- Key people: G. Brint Ryan Founder, CEO, Chairman; Ginny Buckner Kissling Global President, COO
- Revenue: approx. $715 million (2021)
- Number of employees: 3,600
- Website: ryan.com

Ryan LLC is a tax services and software provider based in Dallas, Texas. Ryan LLC has 18,000 clients in over 60 countries. The company has over 113 locations around the globe, including locations in Canada, the Netherlands, the United Kingdom, India, the Philippines, and Australia.

== History ==
Ryan LLC was founded by Chairman and CEO G. Brint Ryan and Chris F. Collis as the CPA firm Collis & Ryan in 1991. Collis' stake in the company was bought out in 1993, and the company was renamed Ryan & Company, P.C. In 1997, the company began expanding into other tax areas beyond state and local taxes. During this time, the company also began to shift its focus to working with clients with annual revenues of $50 million or more. In 1998, the company surrendered its CPA license and began practicing as a tax and consultation firm.

Throughout the early 2000s, the company began expanded outside of Texas, opening new offices primarily through acquisitions. By December 2006, the company had expanded to 28 locations throughout North America. In October 2007, the company changed its name to Ryan LLC.

In September 2018, Ryan LLC became a founding member of the Massachusetts Institute of Technology's FINTECH @ CSAIL initiative.

In June 2019, Ryan, LLC became the "Official Tax Partner" of the Dallas Cowboys. Later that year, Ryan, LLC became the "Official Tax Partner" of Conference USA (C-USA) and became the title sponsor for the C-USA Football Championship Game and the 2020 C-USA Basketball Championships.

In December 2023, the Ninth Court of Appeals of Texas ruled Ryan LLC's breach of contract lawsuit against USA Today owner Gannett could not be heard in Texas courts, due to lack of jurisdiction.

== Acquisitions & sales ==
From 2012 to 2014, Ryan LLC acquired multiple tax service firms, including TAARP Group, WTP Advisors, and the property tax service business from Thomas Reuters. In 2015, it acquired tax technology firms Taxaccord and Second Decimal.

Ryan LLC acquired EnerTax Consultants to expand its severance tax practice in September 2015. In 2016, the company acquired Shiv Om Consultants, a firm known for consulting major gas and oil companies on severance taxes. Ryan LLC reported a revenue of $469 million in 2016.

In March 2017, Ryan LLC purchased land at the Legacy West development in Plano, Texas. In January 2018, Ryan LLC acquired PetroTax Energy Holdings, an Austin-based tax consulting firm, d Scott B. Retzloff & Associates, a San Antonio-based commercial real estate firm. In 2019, the company announced plans to move around 550 employees to the Legacy West development by 2023.

In October 2018, Onex Corporation acquired a 42 percent interest in Ryan LLC, which valued the company at $1.1 billion.

In December 2018, Ryan LLC acquired Denver-based Economics Partners, a global transfer pricing advisory, controversy and business valuation service. The same month, Ryan LLC acquired Paris-based VAT Systems, a tax specialty firm.

In November 2020, Ryan, LLC announced the acquisition of Sydney, Australia-based Indirect Tax Solutions (ITS). Ryan LLC also acquired the Real Estate Tax Group (RETG). Ryan also announced an investment in Incentify, a provider in tax credits and incentives (C&I) software.

In December 2020, Ryan, LLC acquired TCF Services (TCF), a provider in R&D tax credits firm in Australia. Ryan, LLC also announced the acquisition of Burgess Cawley Sullivan (BCS), a property tax consulting and appraisal firm in Vancouver, British Columbia.

In January 2022, Ryan, LLC announced the acquisition of Tax Advisory Services Group, LLC (TASG), a full-service excise tax provider based in Houston, Texas. Then in February 2022, Ryan LLC acquired MacRostie Historic Advisors, LLC (MHA), a property tax consulting firm in the United States. In March 2022, Ryan LLC announced the acquisitions of tax firms Catax and Greystone Property Tax Advisors. In July, 2022, Ryan, LLC announced the acquisition of Paradigm DKD Group, L.L.C., an independent national provider of comprehensive property tax management services.

== Corporate affairs ==
The company formed a Workforce Effectiveness Committee to investigate an employee flexibility policy in 2006. In 2007, the company launched myRyan, a results-focused work environment, as a pilot program in its Houston office. The company implemented the program through the entire company in 2008. In 2013, Ryan LLC established the Culture Council, a team of employees from around the globe that review all internal and external employee feedback data in order to recommend change and improvement for the betterment of the business.

Employees of Ryan LLC can contribute to political campaigns through Ryan PAC, a political action group formed by the firm in 2008. In the 2021-2022 election cycle, the Ryan LLC PAC raised $1.039 million; this included $107,000 contributed to federal campaigns (32.71% to Democrats, 67.29% to Republicans).

== Litigation ==
In August 2014, the Governor's Office of Business and Economic Development prohibited site-selection consultants from taking a percentage of the California Competes Tax Credit, a tax break given to businesses planning on locating or expanding in the state. Ryan sued GO-Biz shortly after the agency implemented the tax credit ban, alleging the prohibition violates the state of California constitution.

In 2014, Ryan LLC won a lawsuit against the IRS regarding Circular 230 rules on contingent fee arrangements that invalidates and permanently enjoins the IRS from prohibiting such arrangements for refund claims and amended returns. The district court ruled that the IRS did not have the statutory authority to place these restrictions.

In 2017, Ryan LLC joined CIC Services, LLC in filing a lawsuit against the IRS to secure an injunction stopping IRS Notice 2016-66. The notice required transactions of captive insurance companies to report more information on transactions. The case was dismissed in November 2017.

In 2024, Ryan LLC filed the first lawsuit against the Federal Trade Commission (FTC) after the FTC issued a ban against noncompete agreements. The suit argues that the FTC does not have the authority to rule over these issues. As of July 3, 2024, Judge Ada Brown ruled to temporarily block the noncompete ban.

== Recognition ==
In 2015, Ryan LLC made the Fortune list of 100 Best Companies to Work For and was ranked number 60 on the list in 2022.

Ryan LLC was named 21st of Glassdoor's Employee's Choice 2019 Best Places to Work.

The company received the 2012 Spirit of Habitat award for advocating and raising awareness of the program.
