= Point Bridge Capital =

American investment company

- Company type: Private company
- Industry: Financial services
- Founded: 2013; 13 years ago
- Founder: Hal Lambert
- Headquarters: Fort Worth, Texas, United States
- Key people: Hal Lambert (Founder and CEO)
- Products: MAGA ETF, investment management advice
- Website: www.pointbridgecapital.com

Point Bridge Capital is an American investment management company based in Texas, founded in 2013. Its MAGA ET is an exchange-traded fund that invests in companies that are especially supportive of the United States Republican political party. The abbreviation MAGA alludes to Make America Great Again, the 2016 Republican presidential campaign slogan of Donald Trump.

The MAGA ETF fund is traded on the BATS Global Markets exchange. Its selection criteria uses Federal Election Commission data to select the top 150 US public companies that meet the political target. The fund is administered by Point Bridge and distributed by Foreside Fund Services.

== History ==
Point Bridge Capital was established by Hal Lambert in 2013.

Point Bridge capital launched the MAGA ETF on September 6, 2017, in reaction to Target Corp's inclusive bathroom policy in 2016 and Donald Trump's nomination. It has a higher expense ratio of 0.72% than simple trackers and funds, which run from 0.04% to 0.08%.

In 2018 the holdings ($39 million) were about 21% industrials, 20% finance, 17% oil and gas, and only 0.6% in tech, with top holdings in Freeport-McMoRan, Apache Corporation, Marathon Oil, TechnipFMC, and Williams Companies.

Hal Lambert was previously a director at Credit Suisse and manager at JP Morgan. Lambert is a Republican donor and finance chair, and was on the 2017 Trump inaugural committee. In February 2025, he was named co-CEO of Clearview AI, alongside Richard Schwartz.

In October 2024, Point Bridge Capital filed a civil racketeering lawsuit against conservative media figure Chuck Johnson (and a partner), accusing them of "falslely presenting themselves as intelligence agents or assets of U.S. government agencies".
