= Hillary Rodham Clinton School of Law =

Law school in Swansea, Wales

University of Swansea Hillary Rodham Clinton School of Law
- Ysgol y Gyfraith Hillary Rodham Clinton Prifysgol Abertawe
- Type: Law school
- Established: 1994
- Affiliations: University of Swansea
- Head: Professor Elwen Evans QC
- Administrative staff: 108
- Location: Swansea, Wales; 51.6100°N 3.9834°W
Colours
- Website: www.swansea.ac.uk/law/

The Hillary Rodham Clinton School of Law (Welsh: Ysgol y Gyfraith Hillary Rodham Clinton Prifysgol Abertawe) is part of Swansea University and located in Swansea, Wales.

It confers LLB degrees, postgraduate courses, and professional conversion and training courses including the Graduate Diploma in Law, Legal Practice Course, and Master of Laws degrees.

== Background ==
Swansea University was founded in 1920 as the fourth college of the University of Wales.

Established in 1993 as the College of Law and Criminology, the School is the largest Law School in Wales and ranks third in the UK for Criminology, and twenty-second in the UK for Law according to the Times.

Academically, Swansea Law School offers LLB degrees, postgraduate courses, and professional conversion and training courses including the Graduate Diploma in Law, Legal Practice Course, and Master of Laws degrees.

== Research ==
In the Research Excellence Framework 2014, 96% of the school’s research was recognised as meeting international standard. This research encompasses the School's numerous research centres including The Swansea University Legal Centre, Centre for Criminal Justice and Criminology, Centre for Innovation and Entrepreneurship in Law, Cyber Threats Intelligence Centre, The Institute of International Shipping and Trade Law and the Wales Observatory on Human Rights of Children and Young People.

== Location ==
The School is based at the University's Singleton Park campus, in the Richard Price building. The School intends to move to purpose-built premises on the University's Bay Campus within the next few years. This new development will house commercial law firms, technology companies, national and international agencies, along with the academics and students of the School.

== Naming ==
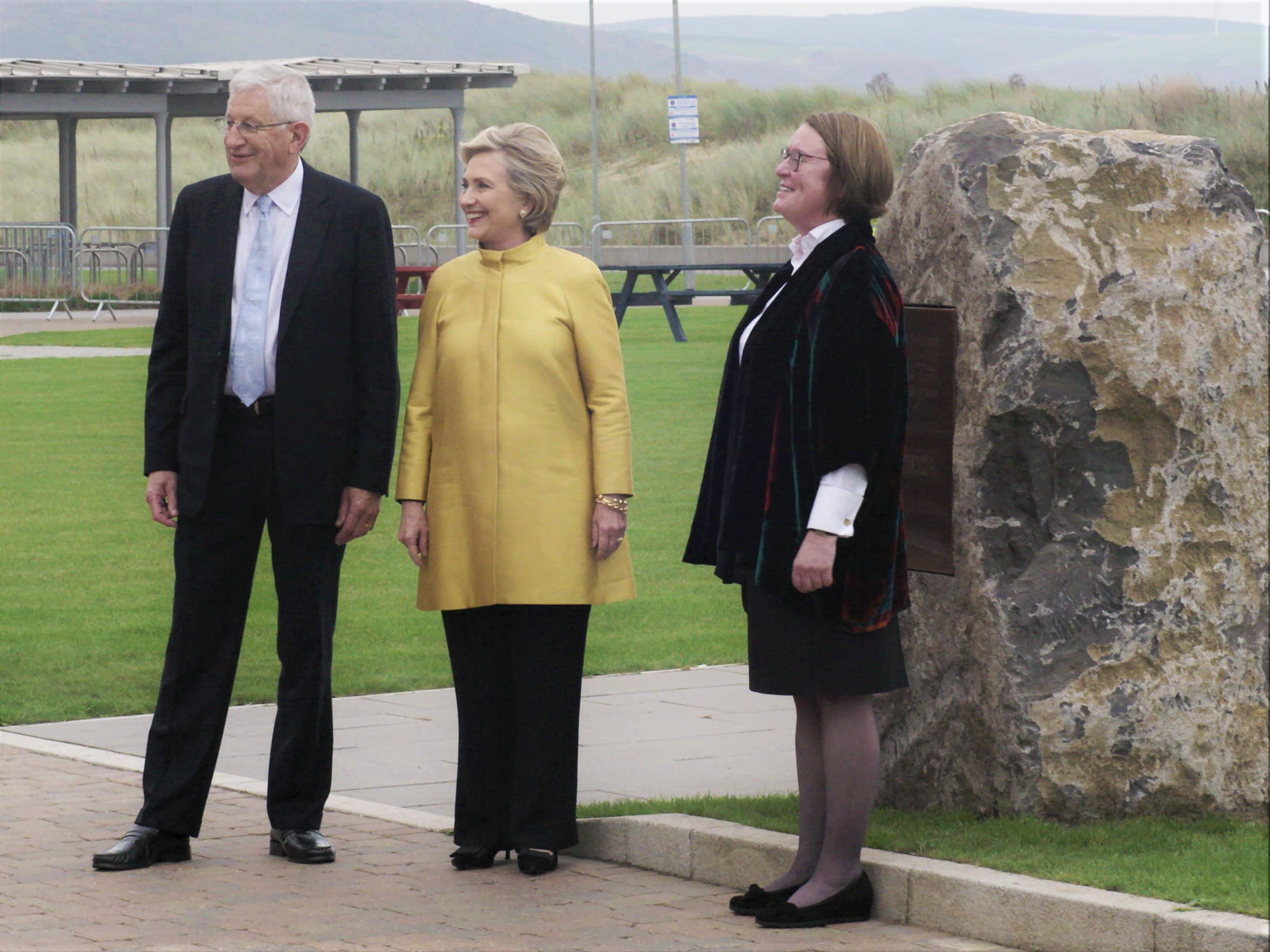
Hillary Clinton at Swansea University

The School was unveiled in 2017 as the Hillary Rodham Clinton School of Law following the conferment of an honorary doctorate to the former U.S. Senator and Secretary of State. Clinton attended the unveiling ceremony at the University's new Bay Campus and spoke to attendees.
