= James Russell =

James or Jim Russell may refer to:

== Entertainment ==
- Jim Russell (actor), Australian comedian and actor
- Jim Russell (cartoonist) (1909–2001), Australian cartoonist
- James Russell (director), British music and events video director
- James Russell (garden designer) (1920–1996), English garden designer
- James Russell (1936–2019), pseudonym of British author Terry Harknett
- James Russell, actor in the 2016 film The Boy

== Law ==
- James Russell (law reporter) (1790–1861), Scottish barrister and law reporter
- James Cholmeley Russell (1841–1912), barrister, financier, and Welsh railway entrepreneur
- James George Russell (1848–1918), Australian lawyer and public servant
- James Russell (Hong Kong judge) (died 1893), Chief Justice of Hong Kong
- James Russell (Canadian judge) (born 1949), Canadian judge

== Politics ==
- James McPherson Russell (1786–1870), U.S. Representative from Pennsylvania
- James Russell (New Brunswick politician) (1824–1915), farmer and political figure in New Brunswick, Canada
- James Alexander Russell (1846–1918), Scottish physician and Lord Provost of Edinburgh
- James C. Russell (1928–2016), American politician in Missouri
- James L. Russell (1938–2017), American politician in Missouri
- James Russell (Newfoundland politician) (born 1940), educator and political figure in Newfoundland and Labrador, Canada
- James T. Russell (politician) (1927–2006), member of the Florida House of Representatives

== Religion ==
- J. Stuart Russell (1816–1895), pastor and author of The Parousia
- James Curdie Russell (1830–1925), Scottish minister
- James Solomon Russell (1857–1935), Episcopal priest and educator

== Science ==
- James Russell (surgeon) (1754–1836), Scottish doctor
- James Russell (inventor) (born 1931), American inventor
- James A. Russell (born 1947), American psychologist
- James Russell III, atmospheric scientist
- James Russell (ecologist), New Zealand biologist and professor
- James Burn Russell (1837–1904), Scottish doctor, Glasgow's first Medical Officer of Health, Chief Medical Officer for Scotland
- James Samuel Risien Russell (1863–1939), Guyanese-British physician and professor of medicine
- James M. Russell, American paleoclimatologist and climatologist

== Sports ==
- James Russell (Australian footballer) (1931–1969), Australian rules footballer
- Jimmy Russell (1879–1925), Australian rules footballer for Melbourne
- Jim Russell (footballer) (1916–1994), Scottish professional footballer
- James Russell (Scottish footballer), Scottish footballer
- Jim Russell (racing driver) (1920–2019), English racing driver
- Jim Russell (ice hockey) (1918–1977), Canadian ice hockey player
- Jim Russell (baseball) (1918–1987), American baseball outfielder
- James Russell (baseball) (born 1986), Major League Baseball pitcher

== Other ==
- James Sargent Russell (1903–1996), United States Navy admiral
- Jim Russell (journalist) (1946–2022), American journalist and producer
- James R. Russell (born 1953), American professor of Ancient Near East studies

== See also ==
- Russell (surname)
