= List of members of the Florida House of Representatives from Brevard County, Florida =

This is a historical list of members of the Florida House of Representatives from Brevard County, Florida from the formation of the county in 1855 until the creation of districts in 1967. Prior to the creation of Brevard County, the area was called St. Lucia County, and prior to that it was a part of Mosquito County. Prior to the creation of districts in 1967, state representatives were elected by county. Beginning in 1967, Brevard County was represented by the 71st, 72nd, 73rd, and 74th districts. Following redistricting in 1970, the county was represented by the 44th, 45th, 46th, 47th and 48th districts. Following redistricting in 1982, the county was represented by the 31st, 32nd, 33rd, 34th, 77th, and 78th districts. Following redistricting in 1992, the county was represented by the 29th, 30th, 31st, and 32nd districts. Following redistricting in 2002, the county was represented by the 29th, 30th, 31st, 32nd, and 80th districts.

== List ==
Representative	Party	Years of service	Residence	Notes
John Heermans		1856, 1858, 1859	Susannah	
Needham Yates		1860, 1861		
Henry Overstreet		1862, 1863, 1865, 1866	Kissimmee	
James F. P. Johnson		1864		
		1867, 1868		Brevard not represented
Frank Smith		1869, 1870	Fort Pierce	
James Paine, Sr.		1871, 1872	St. Lucie	
Robert A. Hardee	Democratic	1873, 1874, 1897	Sebastian	
Quinn Bass		1875		
Archibald C. Bass		1877	Bassville	
J. Quincy Stewart		1879	Georgiana	
Henry Parker		1881, 1893, 1899	St. Lucie, Fort Drum	
Francis Platt		1883	Rockledge	
William Jackson Brack		1885		
Riley Johnson	Democratic	1887	Kissimmee City	
William Norwood	Democratic	1889	Titusville	
H. T. Atkinson		1891		
W. R. Sanders		1895	Courtney	
K. B. Raulerson	Democratic	1901	Fort Pierce	
Wade Jones	Democratic	1903, 1907	Titusville	
Claud Olmstead	Democratic	1905	Fort Pierce	
R. B. Stewart	Democratic	1909, 1911, 1912	Brantley	
J. M. Sanders	Democratic	1913	Cocoa	
John B. Rodes	Democratic	1915, 1917	Melbourne	
Jesse Jackson Parrish	Democratic	1918, 1919, 1921, 1923, 1925	Titusville	Served as Speaker Pro Tempore (1925)
William Jackson Creel	Democratic	1927	Eau Gallie	
Clyde G. Trammell	Democratic	1929, 1931	Melbourne	
Noah B. Butt	Democratic	1933, 1935, 1937, 1939, 1941	Cocoa	Served as Speaker Pro Tempore (1937)
Lemuel Curtis Crofton	Democratic	1943	Titusville	
Roy Frank Roberts	Democratic	1945, 1947, 1949	Titusville	
Hubert Griggs	Democratic	1949	Cocoa	Resigned
O. L. Burton	Democratic	1947, 1949, 1951, 1953, 1955, 1956	Eau Gallie	
William G. Akridge	Democratic	1951, 1953	Cocoa	
A. Max Brewer	Democratic	1955, 1956	Titusville	
Richard Muldrew	Republican	1957	Melbourne	
James H. Pruitt	Democratic	1959, 1961, 1963, 1965, 1966, 1967	Eau Gallie	
Jim Dressler	Democratic	1963	Cocoa	
William H. Roundtree	Democratic	1965–1966	Cocoa	
Palmer Collins	Democratic	1966–1967	Indian Harbour Beach	
Anthony Ninos	Democratic	1966, 1967	Cocoa	

== See also ==
- Government of Brevard County
- History of Brevard County, Florida
