= Florida's 73rd House of Representatives district =

American legislative district

Florida's 73rd State House of Representatives district
Representative
Fiona McFarland; R–Sarasota
- Registration: 50.7% Republican; 47.8% Democratic; 1.6% No party preference
- Demographics: 80.0% White; 5.5% Black; 9.9% Hispanic; 2.8% Asian; 1.4% Native American; 0.1% Hawaiian/Pacific Islander
- Population (2020) • Voting age: 183,473; 18

Florida's 73rd House district elects one member of the Florida House of Representatives. Its current representative is Republican Fiona McFarland. Prior to the creation of districts in 1967, representatives were elected by county. For a historical roster of representatives before 1967, see the List of members of the Florida House of Representatives from Brevard County, Florida. In 2018, Lieutenant Colonel Tommy Gregory (USAF ret.) defeated Democratic challenger resident Liv Coleman by 24 points in the heavily Republican district. After the redistricting of Florida's House districts, representative of district 72 Fiona McFarland defeated teacher Derek Reich by 13 points to become district 73's current representative.

== Representatives from 1967 to the present ==
Representative	Party	Years of service	Residence	Notes
Clifford McNulty	Republican	1967–1970	Melbourne	
Jane Robinson	Republican	1970–1972	Cocoa	Redistricted to the 46th district
Granville Crabtree	Republican	1972–1976		
Thomas Danson, Jr.	Republican	1976–1982		Redistricted to the 69th district
J. Keith Arnold	Democratic	1982–1998	Fort Myers	
Bruce Kyle	Republican	1998–2006		
Nick Thompson	Republican	2006–2010		
Matt Caldwell	Republican	2010–2012	Lehigh Acres	Redistricted to the 79th district
Greg Steube	Republican	2012–2016	Parrish	
Joe Gruters	Republican	2016–2018	Sarasota	
Tommy Gregory	Republican	2018–2022	Sarasota	Redistricted to the 72nd District
Fiona McFarland	Republican	2022–	Sarasota	
