= William Creel =

William Creel may refer to:

- William C. Creel, American politician and civil servant in North Carolina
- William Jackson Creel, member of the Florida House of Representatives
