= John J. Savage =

American politician (1910–1973)

Jack Savage
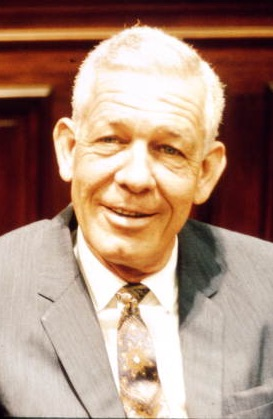
- Savage in 1970

Member of the Florida House of Representatives from the 57th district
- In office November 7, 1972 – July 3, 1973
- Preceded by: Ray Mattox
- Succeeded by: Dennis McDonald

Member of the Florida House of Representatives from the 46th district
- In office 1967 – November 7, 1972
- Preceded by: District created
- Succeeded by: Jane Robinson

Member of the Florida House of Representatives from the Pinellas (1) district
- In office 1965–1967
- Preceded by: James T. Russell
- Succeeded by: Districted abolished (redistricted)

Personal details
- Born: December 6, 1910 United States
- Died: July 3, 1973 (aged 62) St. Petersburg, Florida
- Party: Republican

John J. Savage (December 6, 1910 – July 3, 1973) was an American politician in the state of Florida.

He served in the Florida House of Representatives from 1965 until his death in 1973 (46th district). He was serving as Minority Leader pro tempore in the House of Representatives when he died on July 3, 1973, after a heart attack. During his term of service in the House, he served on various committees including the Standards and Conduct Committee, General Regulations Committee, and Ethics Committee.
