= Clyde G. Trammell =

American politician

Clyde Germany Trammell

Member of the Florida House of Representatives from Brevard County
- In office 1929–1933
- Preceded by: William Jackson Creel
- Succeeded by: Noah B. Butt

28th Mayor of Melbourne, Florida
- In office December 13, 1932 – December 12, 1933
- Preceded by: Robert Lee Rowe
- Succeeded by: I. Kimbell Hicks

Personal details
- Born: July 22, 1892 Lakeland, Polk County, Florida
- Died: 1953 Dade County, Florida
- Party: Democratic
- Spouse: Helen E. Hyman
- Children: Clyde Germany Trammell, Jr. Helen Elise Trammell Boyer
- Occupation: lawyer

Military service
- Rank: Colonel

Clyde Germany Trammell, Sr. (July 22, 1892 – 1953) was a member of the Florida House of Representatives from Brevard County, Florida from 1929 to 1933. He served as mayor of Melbourne, Florida from 1932 to 1933.

He was the son of Eramus Ripley Trammell and Sara Roberta Germany. He was the first cousin of Park Trammell, Governor of Florida.

From November 1939 to May 1941, he was County Attorney for Levy County, Florida.

== See also ==
- List of members of the Florida House of Representatives from Brevard County, Florida

Preceded by William Jackson Creel	Member of the Florida House of Representatives from Brevard County; 1929–1933	Succeeded by Noah Brown Butt
Preceded by Robert Lee Rowe	Mayor of Melbourne, Florida; December 13, 1932–December 12, 1933	Succeeded by I. Kimbell Hicks
