= Everett Kelly (politician) =

American politician

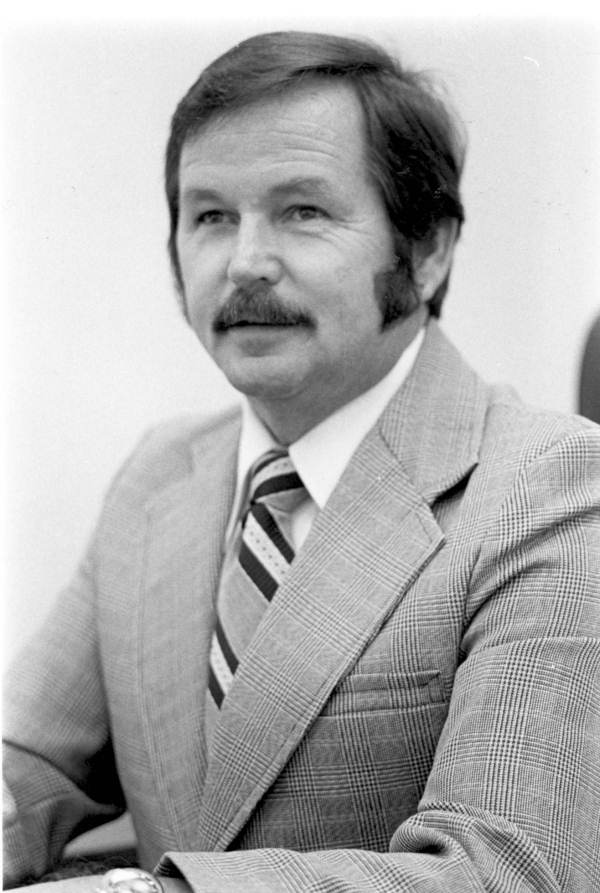

Member of the Florida House of Representatives
- In office November 7, 1978 – November 7, 2000
- Preceded by: Dick Langley
- Succeeded by: Hugh Gibson
- Constituency: 35th district (1978–1982); 46th district (1982–1992); 42nd district (1992–2000)

Personal details
- Born: September 2, 1926 Foley, Alabama, U.S.
- Died: November 13, 2018 (aged 92) Lady Lake, Florida, U.S.
- Party: Democratic, later Republican
- Profession: Pharmacist

Everett A. Kelly (September 2, 1926 – November 13, 2018) was an American politician who served as a Member of the Florida House of Representatives representing 35th district from 1978 to 1982, the 46th district from 1982 to 1992, and the 42nd district from 1992 until 2000. He served as Speaker Pro Tempore from 1990 to 1992.

Elected as a Democrat in 1978, he was reelected to nine more two-year terms before changing parties in August 1997 to become a Republican, and winning reelection in 1998 to his 11th and final term.

Kelly was a pharmacist, and continued to practice his profession while serving in the Florida House of Representatives, as did most of his colleagues. He was also an author, who wrote "The Atlatl" (2005); the historical novel "Ida's Caleb" (2005); a children's book, "Tiny Tom: A Growing Up Story" (2007); and his autobiography, "A Memoir - From Nothing to Fulfillment" (2014).

In later years, he lived in Tavares, Florida with his family and died in November 2018 at the age of 92. He is buried at Florida National Cemetery in Bushnell, Florida.

== Education ==
Kelly was born in 1926 in Foley, Alabama. He moved to Florida with his family in 1928. He served in the United States Navy during World War II. He received a bachelor's degree in Pharmacy from the University of Florida, and a bachelor's degree in Zoology from Florida State University.

Preceded by Dick Langley	Member of the Florida House of Representatives from the 35th district 1978–1982	Succeeded by Art Grindle
Preceded by Marilyn Evans-Jones	Member of the Florida House of Representatives from the 46th district 1982–1992	Succeeded by Phil Mishkin
Preceded by Tom Drage	Member of the Florida House of Representatives from the 42nd district 1992–2000	Succeeded by Hugh Gibson
