= Hugh Gibson (politician) =

American politician (born 1941)

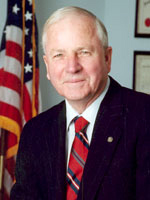
- Official portrait, 2000

Member of the Florida House of Representatives from the 42nd District
- In office November 7, 2000 – November 4, 2008
- Preceded by: Everett Kelly
- Succeeded by: H. Marlene O'Toole

Personal details
- Born: November 6, 1941 (age 85) Camden, New Jersey, U.S.
- Party: Republican
- Spouse: Evelyn J. Gramenzi
- Children: Hugh H. IV, Tracy Williamson, John
- Education: Camden County College
- Occupation: Retired firefighter

Hugh H. Gibson (born November 6, 1941) is a Republican politician who served as a member of the Florida House of Representatives from the 42nd District from 2000 to 2008.

== Early life and career ==
Gibson was born in Camden, New Jersey. He was a police officer for twelve years in New Jersey and served as the Chief of the Cherry Hill Fire Department before moving to Florida in 1992.

In 1995, Gibson ran for the Lady Lake Town Commission in Ward 1 against incumbent Commissioner Ron Thomas. Gibson won in a landslide, winning 67 percent of the vote to Thomas's 33 percent. He was re-elected without opposition in 1997. In 1998, while still serving as a member of the Town Commission, Gibson was elected to the Leesburg Regional Medical Center Board of Trustees, defeating David Harden with 77 percent of the vote. He was elected by the Town Commission to serve as Mayor from 1999 to 2000, and was re-elected to the Commission in 1999 unopposed.

== Florida House of Representatives ==
In 2000, Republican State Representative Everett Kelly was term-limited and unable to seek re-election. Gibson ran to succeed him in the 42nd district, which was based in Lake, Marion, and Sumter counties, and included Bushnell, Mount Dora, and The Villages. He faced former Center Hill Police Chief Will Pruitt in the Republican primary, and defeated him in a landslide, winning 60 percent of the vote. In the general election, Gibson faced Democratic nominee John Martin, the Chairman of the Marion County Planning Commission and a retired Lockheed Martin executive, and Libertarian nominee John Wayne Smith. Gibson defeated both by a wide margin, receiving 55 percent of the vote to Martin's 42 percent and Smith's 3 percent.

Gibson ran for re-election in 2002, and was only challenged by Libertarian nominee Fred Levin, who ran for office as part of a statewide effort by the Libertarian Party of Florida to recruit candidates. Gibson easily defeated him to win a second term, receiving 82 percent of the vote. In 2004, Gibson again only faced a Libertarian challenger, John Wayne Smith, and defeated him in a landslide, winning 75 percent of the vote.

In 2006, Gibson ran for re-election to a fourth term, and he was challenged by Democratic nominee Robert Thompson, a former teacher at East Ridge High School. Gibson ultimately defeated Thompson, winning 58 percent of the vote to Thompson's 42 percent.

Gibson was term-limited in 2008 and unable to seek re-election.
