= Bob Hattaway =

American politician (1936–2024)

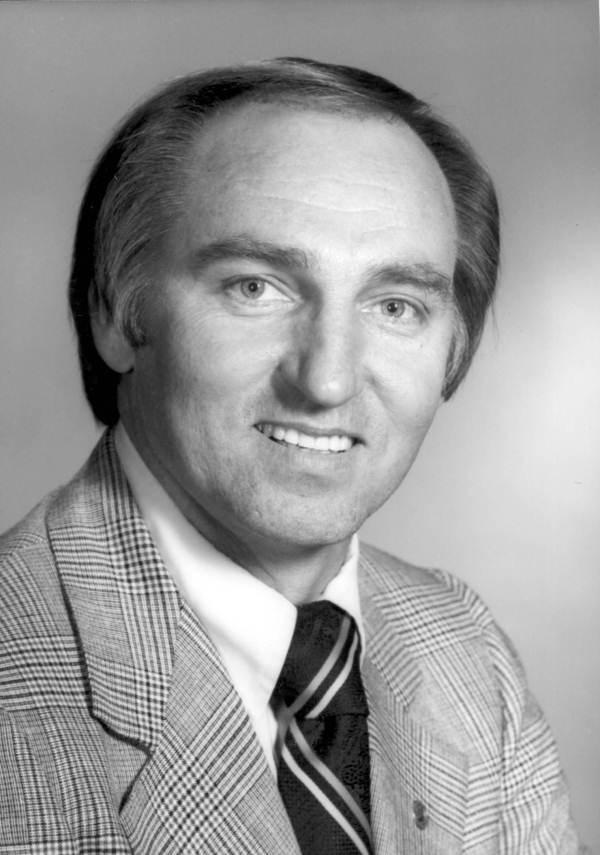
- Hattaway in 1980

Member of the Florida House of Representatives from the 33rd district
- In office November 5, 1974 – November 2, 1982
- Preceded by: Eugene Mooney
- Succeeded by: Marilyn Evans-Jones

Personal details
- Born: November 5, 1936 Altamonte Springs, Florida, U.S.
- Died: November 22, 2024 (aged 88)
- Party: Democratic
- Occupation: Realtor

Robert Hattaway (November 5, 1936 – November 22, 2024) was an American politician in the state of Florida. He was a realtor by profession.

Hattaway was born in Altamonte Springs and attended the Florida Real Estate School. He served in the Florida House of Representatives for the 33rd district from 1974 to 1982, as a Democrat. He lived in Altamonte Springs. Hattaway died on November 22, 2024, at the age of 88.
