= H. Marlene O'Toole =

Florida State Representative

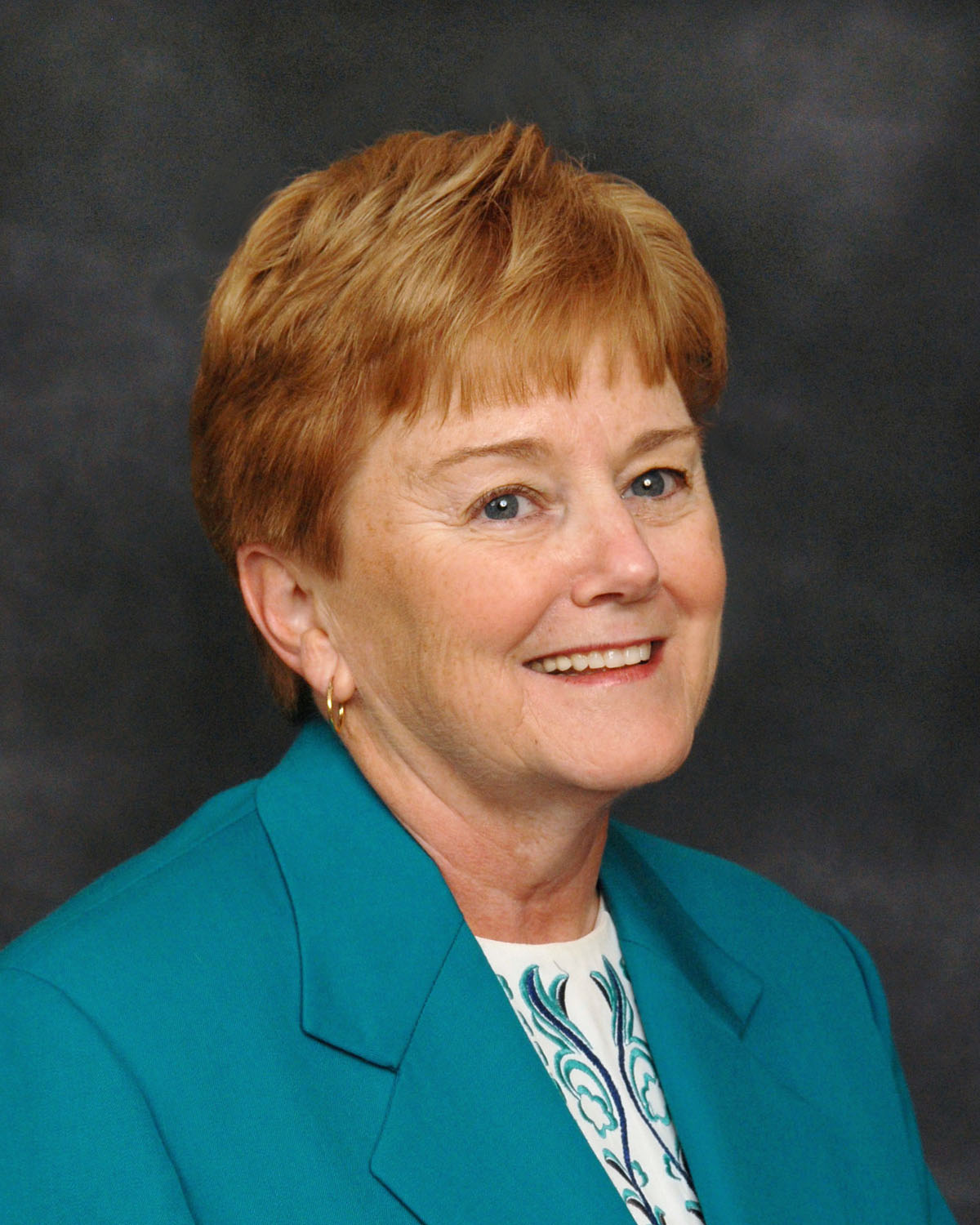
- Official portrait, 2008

Member of the Florida House of Representatives
- In office November 4, 2008 – November 8, 2016
- Preceded by: Hugh Gibson
- Succeeded by: Don Hahnfeldt
- Constituency: 42nd district (2008–2012); 33rd district (2012–2018)

Personal details
- Born: February 18, 1945 (age 81) Somerville, Massachusetts
- Died: January 30, 2024 Florida
- Party: Republican
- Spouse: Ed O'Toole
- Children: Kathleen, Colleen, Linda, Eddie, Jennie
- Profession: IBM executive

H. Marlene O'Toole (February 18, 1945 – January 30, 2024) was a Republican member of the Florida House of Representatives representing the 33rd district, which includes Sumter County, northern Lake County, and southern Marion County, including Webster, Center Hill, Bushnell, Wildwood, Lady Lake, and The Villages, since 2012, previously representing the 42nd district from 2008 to 2012.

== History ==
O'Toole was born in Somerville, Massachusetts, and began working for IBM in 1967. She eventually became the company's Regional Manager for the South, overseeing eight hundred employees, moving to Florida in 1992. In 1997, after retiring from IBM, she became the Director of Take Stock in Children, an organization based in Lake County and Sumter County that provided scholarships to at-risk children.

== Florida House of Representatives ==
When incumbent State Representative Hugh Gibson was unable to seek re-election due to term limits, O'Toole ran to succeed him as a Republican in the 42nd district, which included parts of eastern Lake County, southern Marion County, and northern Sumter County. In the primary, she faced Will Pruitt, the brother of then-State Senator Ken Pruitt, and she campaigned on improving the economy and "helping seniors understand government legislation." O'Toole ended up winning the primary by a comfortable margin, receiving 59% of the vote to Pruitt's 41%. In the general election, she faced only write-in opposition, though she insisted that she was not feeling complacent, noting, "You're never done--not if you're smart, you're never done. I'm still going to meetings, forums and groups." She won with nearly 100% of the vote. Running for re-election in 2010, she won the nomination of her party uncontested and advanced to the general election, where she faced independent candidate Jeff Shoobridge. O'Toole was re-elected with 76% of the vote.

Following the reconfiguration of legislative districts in 2012, O'Toole was moved into the 33rd district, which retained most of the territory that she had previously represented. She was unopposed in both the primary and the general elections, and was re-elected to her third term uncontested. In 2014, O'Toole was re-elected to her fourth and final term in the House unopposed.

=== Ethics allegations ===
On January 23, 2015, the Florida Commission on Ethics determined that O’Toole failed to disclose a voting conflict when she voted on the state's 2013 budget. The commission determined that O’Toole did not disclose her dual roles as Chief Operating Officer of Take Stock in Children and vice chair of the House education appropriations committee that approved $6 million for the nonprofit. On March 11, 2015, the Florida House of Representatives determined that O'Toole would not receive punishment for the nondisclosure. In defense, O'Toole cited an annual Full and Public Disclosure of Financial Interest Form 6 in which her annual income from Take Stock in Children was reported.
