= Hazel, Kentucky =

- City
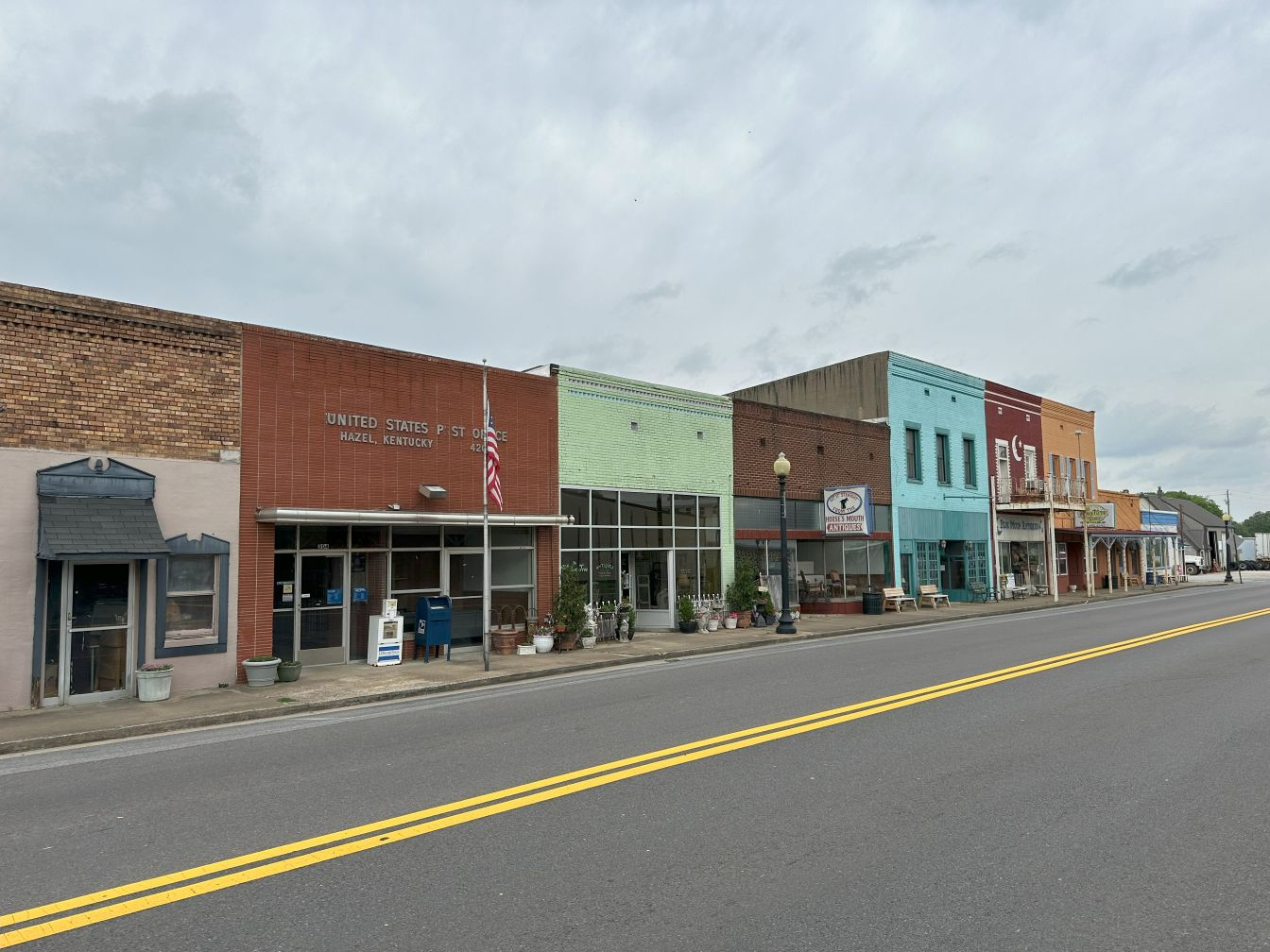

- Location of Hazel in Calloway County, Kentucky.
- Coordinates: 36°30′17″N 88°19′32″W
- Country: United States
- State: Kentucky
- County: Calloway
- Incorporated: 1911

Area
  - Total: 0.35 sq mi (0.91 km^{2})
  - Land: 0.35 sq mi (0.91 km^{2})
  - Water: 0 sq mi (0.00 km^{2})
- Elevation: 564 ft (172 m)

Population (2020)
  - Total: 390
  - Density: 1,114.1/sq mi (430.17/km^{2})
- Time zone: UTC-6 (Central (CST))
  - Summer (DST): UTC-5 (CDT)
- ZIP code: 42049
- Area codes: 270 & 364
- FIPS code: 21-35380
- GNIS feature ID: 0493943
- Website: hazelky.com

Hazel is a home rule-class city in Calloway County, Kentucky, United States. As of the 2020 census, Hazel had a population of 390.

== Geography ==
Hazel is located in southern Calloway County at 36°30′17″N 88°19′32″W (36.504658, −88.325443). It is north of Paris, Tennessee, and south of Murray on the Tennessee-Kentucky border.

According to the United States Census Bureau, the city has a total area of 0.37 square miles (0.96 km^{2}), all land.

== History ==
The town was founded as a stop on the Nashville, Chattanooga and St. Louis Railway in 1890. The first post office was established the same year. The origins of its name are unclear: it may have derived from local hazel shrubs or from a supposed daughter of either a railroad conductor or the first postmaster.

The city was formally incorporated by the Kentucky General Assembly in 1911.

== Demographics ==
Historical population
Census	Pop.	Note	%±
1910	395		—
1920	415		5.1%
1930	359		−13.5%
1940	396		10.3%
1950	444		12.1%
1960	342		−23.0%
1970	424		24.0%
1980	465		9.7%
1990	460		−1.1%
2000	440		−4.3%
2010	410		−6.8%
2020	390		−4.9%
U.S. Decennial Census

As of the census of 2000, there were 440 people, 197 households, and 121 families residing in the city. The population density was 1,160.3 inhabitants per square mile (448.0/km^{2}). There were 223 housing units at an average density of 588.1 per square mile (227.1/km^{2}). The racial makeup of the city was 92.73% White, 7.05% African American, and 0.23% from two or more races.

There were 197 households, out of which 29.4% had children under the age of 18 living with them, 47.7% were married couples living together, 11.2% had a female householder with no husband present, and 38.1% were non-families. 33.0% of all households were made up of individuals, and 15.2% had someone living alone who was 65 years of age or older. The average household size was 2.23 and the average family size was 2.86.

In the city, the population was spread out, with 23.2% under the age of 18, 8.0% from 18 to 24, 28.0% from 25 to 44, 20.9% from 45 to 64, and 20.0% who were 65 years of age or older. The median age was 39 years. For every 100 females, there were 82.6 males. For every 100 females age 18 and over, there were 83.7 males.

The median income for a household in the city was $28,289, and the median income for a family was $33,500. Males had a median income of $26,771 versus $17,292 for females. The per capita income for the city was $13,689. About 9.8% of families and 11.7% of the population were below the poverty line, including 15.8% of those under age 18 and 11.0% of those age 65 or over.

== Culture ==
In Hazel, antique shops dot Main Street along with other shops and a small café. The town's yearly fall Hazel celebration, "Hazel Day", is now held in early October.

== Notable people ==
- Childhood home of Florida politician O. L. Burton.
- Birthplace of 1960s singer-songwriter Jackie DeShannon.
- Birthplace of philanthropist Ella Florence Fondren.
