= Richard Muldrew =

American politician (1919–1982)

Richard B. Muldrew

Member of the Florida House of Representatives from Brevard County
- In office 1957–1959
- Preceded by: Max Brewer
- Succeeded by: James H. Pruitt

Personal details
- Born: January 12, 1919 Watertown, New York, U.S.
- Died: July 10, 1982 (aged 63) Brevard County, Florida, U.S.
- Party: Republican
- Spouse: B. Marie
- Occupation: attorney

Richard Benjamin Muldrew (January 12, 1919 – July 10, 1982) was an American politician. He served as a Republican member of the Florida House of Representatives from 1957 to 1959. He served on the Brevard County Commission from 1960 to 1970.

In 1966, Muldrew sought the nomination of the Florida Republican Party to run for Governor of Florida, but was defeated by Claude R. Kirk, Jr. In 1970, his former rival, Governor Kirk, appointed him a county circuit judge. He died on July 10, 1982.

== See also ==
- Florida gubernatorial election, 1966
- List of members of the Florida House of Representatives from Brevard County, Florida

Preceded by Max Brewer	Member of the Florida House of Representatives; 1957–1959	Succeeded by James H. Pruitt
