= Marilyn Evans-Jones =

American politician (1928–2021)

Marilyn B. Evans-Jones
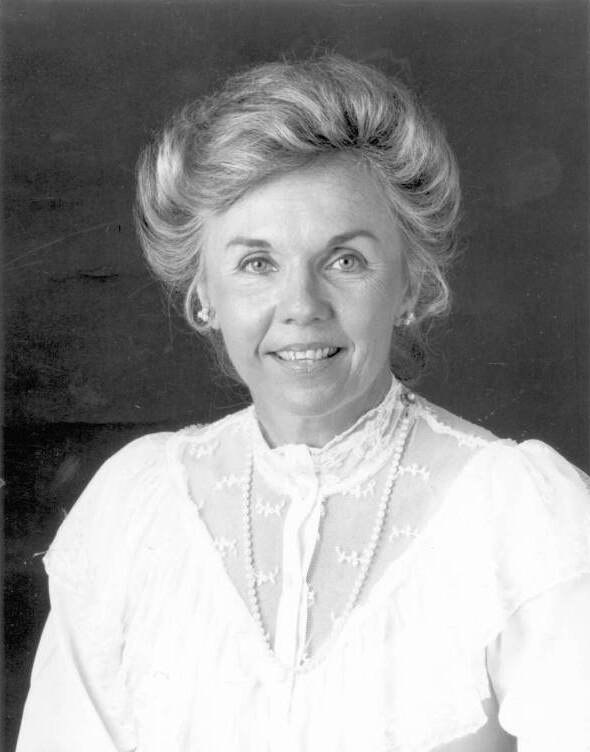
- Evans-Jones c. 1982

Member of the Florida House of Representatives from the 33rd district
- In office November 2, 1982 – November 4, 1986
- Preceded by: Bob Hattaway
- Succeeded by: Harry Goode

Member of the Florida House of Representatives from the 46th district
- In office November 2, 1976 – November 2, 1982
- Preceded by: Jane Robinson
- Succeeded by: Everett Kelly

Personal details
- Born: November 19, 1928 DeLand, Florida
- Died: July 23, 2021 (aged 92) Jacksonville, Florida
- Party: Republican
- Spouse(s): Hugh Macaulay Evans, Sr., Edward E. Jones, Jr.
- Children: Hugh, Daniel, Cecile and Mary Louise
- Education: Duke University (Education, 1950)
- Occupation: Realtor

Marilyn Bailey Evans-Jones (November 19, 1928 – July 23, 2021) was a member of the Florida House of Representatives for 10 years. She represented the 46th district from 1976 to 1982, and after redistricting, the 33rd district from 1982 to 1986.

== Early years and family ==
She was born in DeLand, Florida, on November 19, 1928, the daughter of Cecil C. Bailey, the Chairman of the Game and Fresh Water Fish Commission and Augusta Mann Bailey. The family moved to Jacksonville in 1930. She was raised and attended local schools in Jacksonville. She was junior and senior year class president in high school, as well as student of the year. She graduated from Duke University with a degree in education in 1950. She married Hugh Macaulay Evans, Sr. immediately following graduation, and soon after became a mother of four children.

== Political career ==
After settling in Brevard County in 1963, she became president of Republican Women in South Brevard, and volunteered as a lobbyist for United Methodist Women and the League of Women Voters. She worked on her husband, Hugh's campaign for a seat on the Brevard County Commission. She ran for a seat in the Florida House of Representatives, and won, taking office in 1976.

=== Florida House of Representatives ===
As a state representative, Evans-Jones worked to pass Florida's Child Safety Restraint Bill, and Clean Indoor Air Act. She helped to establish adult day care centers and bring about reform in mental health institutions and prisons.

In 1986 she ran for Florida Lieutenant Governor as the running mate of Louis Frey, Jr. but they lost in the Republican primary to Bob Martinez, the former Republican mayor of Tampa.

After ten years in the Florida Legislature, she retired and moved to Nassau County with her second husband Ed Jones, who had served as mayor of Fernandina Beach.

=== Later career ===
In 1997, she served as a member of the Constitution Revision Commission, where she supported redistricting by the judiciary.

She was instrumental in the creation of Micah's Place, a shelter for battered spouses. Her volunteer activities have been recognized through awards such as the Eve Award for Volunteer Services in 2004 and the Heart of Gold Award for Senior Volunteer Activity in 2007.

She served as a delegate to the Republican National Convention. She died at her daughter's Jacksonville home on July 23, 2021.

Preceded by Jane Robinson	Member of the Florida House of Representatives from the 46th district 1976–1982	Succeeded by Everett Kelly
Preceded by Bob Hattaway	Member of the Florida House of Representatives from the 33rd district 1982–1986	Succeeded by Harry Goode
