= Debra Prewitt =

American politician (born 1963)

Member of the Florida House of Representatives from the 46th district
- In office November 8, 1994 – November 3, 1998
- Preceded by: Phil Mishkin
- Succeeded by: Heather Fiorentino

Personal details
- Born: April 19, 1963 (age 63) Livonia, Michigan
- Party: Democratic
- Education: Pasco-Hernando Community College (A.A.); Eckerd College
- Occupation: Human services

Debra A. Prewitt (born April 19, 1963) is a Democratic politician from Florida who served as a member of the Florida House of Representatives from 1994 to 1998.

== Early life ==
Prewitt was born in Livonia, Michigan, in 1963, and moved to Florida in 1971. She graduated from Gulf High School in 1981, and then attended Pasco-Hernando Community College, graduating with her associate's degree in marketing. Prewitt worked for the local Better Business Bureau as a membership counselor.

In 1987, Prewitt ran for one of the three at-large seats on the New Port Richey City Council. She placed fifth in the election. Prewitt ran again in 1989, and narrowly won, defeating incumbent City Councilwoman Fran Oreto by 15 votes, and becoming the youngest city council member in city history. Prewitt was re-elected in 1991.

Prewitt ran for mayor in 1992, and won by a four-vote margin, becoming the first female mayor in the city's history. She was barred from seeking another term in 1994 by term limits.

== Florida House of Representatives ==
In 1994, Prewitt ran for the Florida House of Representatives from the 46th district, seeking to succeed retiring State Representative Phil Mishkin. In the Democratic primary, she ran against insurance agent Karen Stockwell and perennial candidate Frank Janczlik. Prewitt narrowly placed second in the primary, winning 42 percent of the vote to Stockwell's 44 percent, and they advanced to a runoff election. She defeated Stockwell, winning 57 percent of the vote.

Prewitt faced former New Port Richey Councilman Bill Phillips, the Republican nominee, and independent Joe Mastrocolo, a social conservative who was registered as a Democrat, in the general election. Prewitt narrowly won, receiving 45 percent of the vote to Phillips's 43 percent and Mastrocolo's 12 percent.

In 1996, Prewitt ran for re-election, and was challenged by Republican Alan Levine, a hospital executive. Though both parties targeted the seat, Prewitt "resoundingly" won re-election, winning 58 percent of the vote to his 42 percent.

Prewitt ran for a third term in 1998, and was challenged by New Port Richey City Councilwoman Heather Fiorentino. The race between Prewitt and Fiorentino was close, with Prewitt initially appearing to win re-election by 15 votes. However, following a recount, Fiorentino ended up defeating Prewitt by 23 votes.
