= Thomas Danson Jr. =

American politician

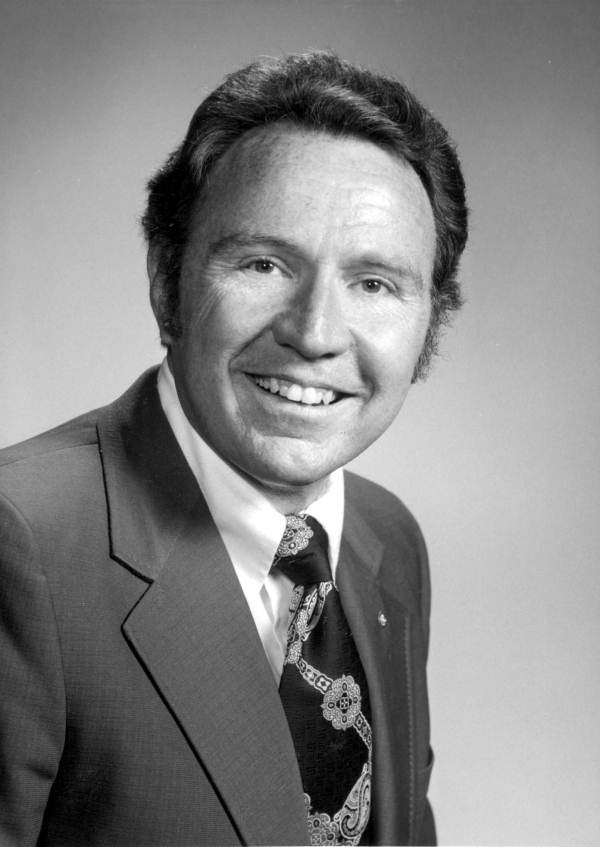

Member of the Florida House of Representatives from the 69th district
- In office November 2, 1982 - November 6, 1984
- Preceded by: George Sheldon
- Succeeded by: Harry Jennings

Member of the Florida House of Representatives from the 73rd district
- In office November 2, 1976 - November 2, 1982
- Preceded by: Granville Crabtree
- Succeeded by: J. Keith Arnold

Personal details
- Born: December 17, 1933 Jacksonville, Florida, U.S.
- Died: July 31, 2016 (aged 82) Sarasota, Florida, U.S.
- Party: Republican
- Occupation: insurance agent

Thomas Edward Danson Jr. (December 17, 1933 – July 31, 2016) was an American politician in the state of Florida.

Danson was born in Jacksonville, and attended the University of Florida. He was an insurance agent. He served in the Florida House of Representatives for the 73rd and 69th (the latter in his last term) district from 1976 to 1984, as a Republican. He died on July 31, 2016.
