= Ron Richmond =

American politician

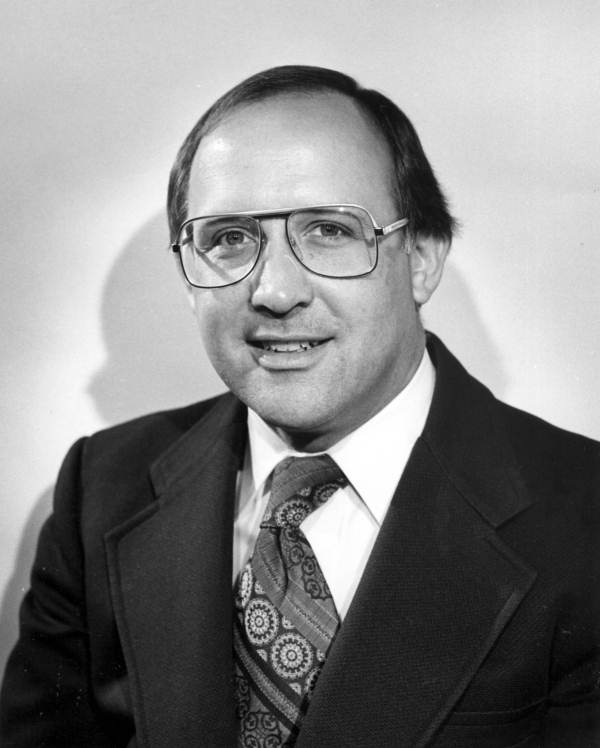
- Richmond in 1978

Minority Leader of the Florida House of Representatives
- In office November 16, 1982 – November 20, 1984

Member of the Florida House of Representatives
- In office November 21, 1972 – November 20, 1984
- Preceded by: William M. Gillespie
- Succeeded by: John K. Renke II
- Constituency: 37th district (1972-1982); 49th district (1982-1984)

Personal details
- Born: Ronald Ray Richmond; April 1, 1941 Linton, Indiana, U.S.
- Died: December 22, 2022 (aged 81)
- Party: Republican
- Spouse: Eileen Gomez
- Children: 2
- Education: Florida State University (BA); Stetson University (JD)

Military service
- Branch/service: United States Air Force

Ronald Ray Richmond (April 1, 1941 – December 22, 2022) was an American politician and lawyer from Florida.

== Early life, education and military service ==
Richmond was born in Linton, Indiana. He graduated from Florida State University with a Bachelor of Arts in 1962 and from the Stetson College of Law with a Juris Doctor in 1969. He is a veteran of the United States Air Force.

== Career ==
Richmond served in the Florida House of Representatives from 1972 to 1984, as a Republican representing the 37th and 49th districts. He also served a stint as minority leader.

He practiced law in Tallahassee, Florida.

== Personal life ==
He and his wife Eileen have two children.
