= Heather Fiorentino =

American politician (born 1958)

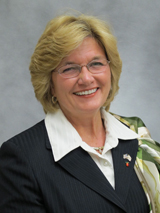

Pasco County Superintendent of Schools
- In office November 22, 2004 – November 20, 2012
- Preceded by: John Long
- Succeeded by: Kurt S. Browning

Member of the Florida House of Representatives from the 46th district
- In office November 3, 1998 – November 2, 2004
- Preceded by: Debra Prewitt
- Succeeded by: John Legg

Personal details
- Born: January 25, 1958 (age 68) Columbia, South Carolina
- Party: Republican
- Spouse: Joseph "Joe" Fiorentino III
- Children: 2
- Education: Pasco-Hernando Community College (A.A.); University of South Florida (B.A.)
- Occupation: Teacher

Heather Fiorentino (born January 25, 1958) is a Republican politician from Florida who served as a member of the Florida House of Representatives from the 46th district from 1998 to 2004 and as Pasco County Superintendent of Schools from 2004 to 2012.

Heather Fiorentino (born January 25, 1958) is an American educator and former politician from Florida. She served in the Florida House of Representatives from 1998 to 2004 and later served as superintendent of Pasco County Schools from 2004 to 2012.

== Early life and education ==
Heather Fiorentino was born on January 25, 1958, in Columbia, South Carolina. Fiorentino attended Pasco-Hernando Community College and the University of South Florida. She was involved in public service in Pasco County during this time.

== Career ==
Before entering state politics, Fiorentino served on the New Port Richey City Council for three terms. She was elected to the Florida House of Representatives in 1998 and represented the 46th district until 2004.

In the Florida House, she served on committees including the Subcommittee on Human Services Appropriations.

In 2004, Fiorentino became superintendent of Pasco County Schools and served in that role for eight years. She was the first woman to hold the position.

== Later years ==
After leaving office, Fiorentino was subject to an investigation related to her time as superintendent.
