= Ella Florence Fondren =

American philanthropist

- Born: Ella Florence Cochrum; June 1, 1880; Hazel, Kentucky, US
- Died: May 3, 1982 (aged 101); Houston, Texas, US
- Known for: Philanthropy
- Notable work: Fondren Foundation
- Spouse: Walter W. Fondren

Ella Florence Fondren (née Cochrum; June 1, 1880 – May 3, 1982) was an American philanthropist to hospitals and institutions of higher learning.

== Early life ==
Ella Florence Fondren was born on June 1, 1880, to Allen Cathy and Mary (Pogue) Cochrum in Hazel, Kentucky. She grew up in Corsicana, Texas. After the death of her father in 1895, she left school to care for the family and work in their boardinghouse. On February 14, 1904, she married Walter W. Fondren, an oil worker.

== Philanthropy ==
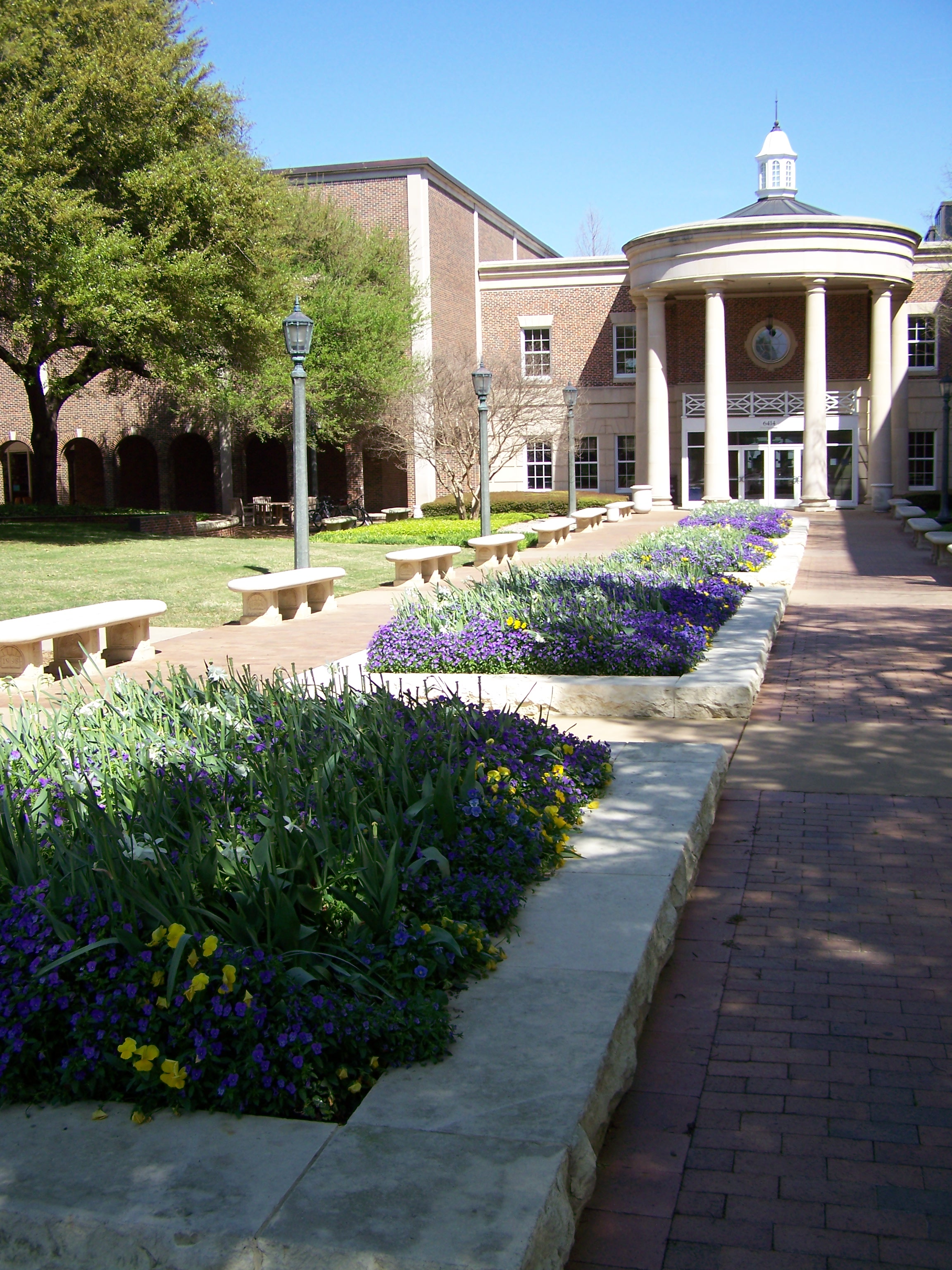
Fondren Library at Southern Methodist University

Walter Fondren worked in oil fields along the Gulf corridor in Texas, but focused his attention on the Humble fields while co-founding the Humble Oil Company. The couple worked together in philanthropy until his death in 1939. Ella assumed some of Walter's directorships, continuing a long relationship with Southern Methodist University by taking a seat on its board of trustees and governors, a position that she held for three decades. She served on the Methodist Board of Homes and Hospitals for twenty years.

After the death of her husband, Fondren pursued a path of charitable giving. Her family granted $1 million for the Walter W. Fondren Library at Rice University in 1946. Two years later she created the Fondren Foundation, which supported education and hospitals. The Foundation granted funding for capital projects at Baylor University, Georgetown University, Rice University, Scarritt College, while donating money to Southern Methodist University for a science building and for scholarships. The foundation facilitated the expansions of Methodist and St. Luke's Hospitals in Houston. Fondren was a trustee for Baylor College of Medicine, Scaritt College, and the Texas Medical Center.

== Death and legacy ==
Fondren died on 3 May 1982 in Houston after living for over a century. She is interred at Forest Park Cemetery in Houston. Fondren Road in Houston was named in honor of the family.
