= Dusty Rhodes (baseball coach) =

American baseball coach

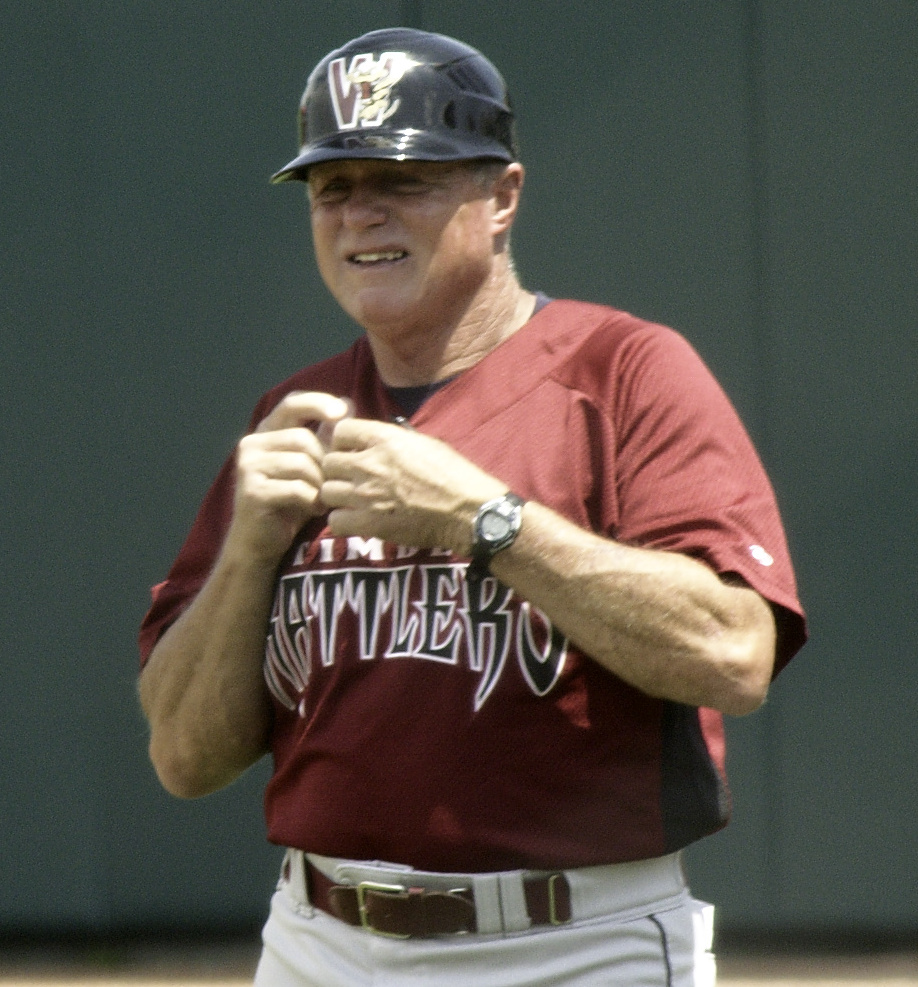
- Rhodes with the Wisconsin Timber Rattlers in 2011

Biographical details
- Born: August 6, 1946 (age 80); Talladega, Alabama, U.S.
- Education: Palm Beach High School (1964) Palm Beach Jr. College (1966) Florida Southern College (1969) Florida Atlantic University (1973)

Coaching career (HC unless noted)
- 1969: Florida Southern College (assistant)
- 1974: Palm Beach JC (assistant)
- 1975–1982: Palm Beach JC
- 1983–1987: Florida (assistant)
- 1988–2010: North Florida
- 2011–2013: Wisconsin Timber Rattlers (hitting)
- 2014–2017: Flagler College (volunteer assistant)

Head coaching record
- Overall: 1,212–566

Accomplishments and honors

Championships
- NCAA Division II College World Series National Runner-up (2005)

Awards
- 2016 American Baseball Coaches Association Lefty Gomez Award Winner; Member of American Baseball Coaches Association Hall of Fame; Palm Beach County Sports Hall of Fame; University of North Florida Athletics Hall of Fame (2011); Inaugural Peach Belt Conference Hall of Fame; Peach Belt Conference Coach of the Year: 1999, 2000, 2001, 2004, 2005; Florida Sports Amateur Coach of the Year: 2001

Jack Dusty Rhodes (born 1946) is an American retired baseball coach and the former head coach of the University of North Florida. Over his more than 30-year college coaching career, he won more than 1,000 games and coached nearly two dozen Major League players. In January 2009, he was inducted into the American Baseball Coaches Association Hall of Fame and was a recipient of the ABCA's Lefty Gomez Award.

== Early life ==
Rhodes was born in Talladega, Alabama, and moved to West Palm Beach, Florida, when he was six years old. His father, Jack Burton Rhodes, a World War II veteran, was a cabinet maker for sportfishing yachts and his mother, Florence Miller Rhodes, was employed as a secretary for the Palm Beach Post. Rhodes played Little Major League Baseball at Phipps Park and went on to letter in football, basketball and baseball at Palm Beach High School, where he was co-captain of the Wildcats football team and a Livingston State College recruit. In 1963 and 1964, he was a member of back-to-back state championship baseball teams with American Legion Post 12

== Playing career ==
In 1965 and 1966, Rhodes played on the first intercollegiate baseball team at Palm Beach JC, primarily at third base and pitcher. After earning an associate degree, he transferred to Florida Southern College, where he played shortstop as a junior in 1967 and led the team in assists. As a senior in 1968, he played third base, batted .260, led the team in doubles (6) and posted a .900 fielding percentage. After his collegiate career, Rhodes played semi-pro baseball in West Palm Beach.

== Coaching career ==
In 1969, Rhodes served as an assistant coach at Florida Southern, where he also oversaw the "B" team for head coach Hal Smeltzly. He taught physical education in the Palm Beach County school system for the next six years, and served as the baseball and football coach at Conniston Junior High School in West Palm Beach. During the summer, Rhodes served as an assistant coach for Pam Beach Post 12, including in 1977 when the team won the state title and advanced to the semifinals of the American Legion World Series in New Hampshire.

=== 1974–1982 ===
In 1974, Rhodes joined head coach Mel Edgerton (1969–1974) as an unpaid assistant baseball coach at Palm Beach Junior College before being elevated to head coach in 1975. Rhodes' inaugural team tied the school record for wins with 17 and finished the season with a 28–13 mark. Rhodes led the Pacers to winning seasons in 1976 and 1977 and guided them to a No. 13 national ranking in 1978 and a No. 1 national ranking in 1979. His '79 squad, which included pitcher Randy O'Neal, won 52 games and earned a berth in the state tournament as a division runner-up. In February 1980, Rhodes hosted a booster club benefit for his team that featured New York Yankees Hall of Famer Mickey Mantle and Major League managers Dick Howser (Yankees) and Bobby Cox (Atlanta Braves) as special guests. Howser's nephew, Tommy Howser, led the state in steals in 1979 for the Pacers. Rhodes' 1980 team finished 50-18 but missed the state tournament after tying for second in the division. His final PBJC team placed third at the state tournament and finished 40–10 overall. PBJC catcher Tim Owen was named an NJCAA honorable mention All-American. Other future Major Leaguers who played for Rhodes at PBJC include pitchers Andy McGaffigan and Ross Baumgarten and infielder Robby Thompson. After winning more than 300 games in eight years at PBJC, Rhodes was offered an assistant coaching position with the University of Florida.

=== 1983–1987 ===
Rhodes served as an assistant baseball coach at the University of Florida, first for Florida Southern baseball alum Jack Rhine in 1983 and for former Florida Southern skipper Joe Arnold from 1984 to 1987. Rhodes was one of four finalists to succeed Rhine in 1984. In 1986, Rhodes served as the interim head coach for the final 11 games of the season after Arnold took a leave of absence. Under Rhodes, the Gators went 7–4 to close out the season. During his five-year coaching stint in Gainesville, Rhodes helped the Gators win the SEC baseball tournament in 1984 and qualify for the NCAA regionals three times. In October 1987, Rhodes was chosen from a pool of more than 100 applicants to become the first head baseball coach at the University of North Florida.

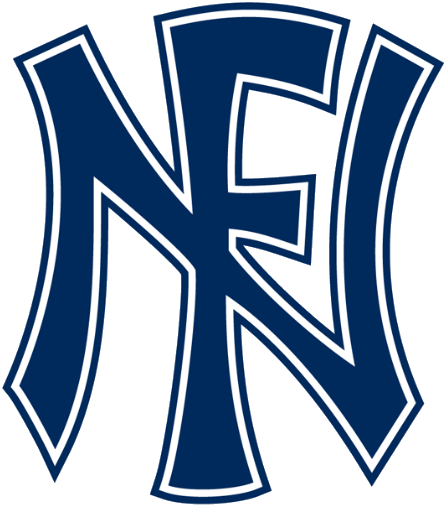
Baseball logo (1988–2010)

=== 1988–1993 ===
Once at North Florida, Rhodes designed the team's uniform logo to resemble the interlocking letters of the New York Yankees logo. He built a small-college powerhouse practically overnight, primarily by recruiting junior college talent. His inaugural team went 47–17 overall, won a district title and reached the National Association of Intercollegiate Athletics Area 5 playoffs. The following year, the fledgling Ospreys won 53 games and finished third at the NAIA College World Series. In 1990, after losing eight starters from the previous year, Rhodes led the Ospreys to a 43–20 record and 19–3 mark in conference play. His 1990 pitching staff led the NAIA with a combined 2.21 ERA. His 1991 squad won a school-record 57 games, went 23–1 in the conference and placed third at NAIA World Series. Junior pitcher Sid Roberson was named the 1991 NAIA player of the year after posting a 15–1 record. In 1993, NAIA All-American and District 7 Player of the year Todd Dunn was selected by the Milwaukee Brewers in the first round of the Major League draft. After winning nearly 300 baseball games on the NAIA level, UNF moved up to the NCAA Division II level in 1994.

=== 1994–2005 ===
In his first four seasons in NCAA Division II competition, Rhodes led the Ospreys to three winning seasons and four NCAA regional berths while competing in the Sunshine State Conference. His 1997 team hit a then-school record 88 home runs. Starting in 1998, he found even greater success in the Peach Belt Conference, where his teams were ranked No. 1 on four occasions and reached the Division II World Series three times, including in 2005 when they finished as the national runner-up.

=== 2006–2010 ===
In his first year of NCAA Division I competition, Rhodes led the Ospreys to a second-place finish in the Atlantic Sun Conference regular season standings. But due to its first year of provisional status in Division I, his 34-win team was ineligible for the postseason conference tournament. In 2009, the Ospreys (23–31), then in their final year of provisional status, defeated four in-state opponents (the Florida Gators, Florida State Seminoles, Miami Hurricanes, and South Florida Bulls). Rhodes went on to coach one more winning team at UNF but never finished higher than 4th in the conference standings. After sending more than 60 Ospreys to the minor leagues, he announced his retirement following the 2010 season. That same year, UNF dedicated Dusty Rhodes Field at Harmon Stadium in his honor.

=== Minor leagues ===
In 1982, Rhodes was offered his first coaching assignment in the minor leagues with the New York Yankees Class A affiliate in Greensboro, North Carolina. In 1988 and 1989, he managed the Milwaukee Brewers Rookie League affiliate Helena Brewers, leading the short-season summer league team to back-to-back winning seasons and runner-up finishes in the division. In 1990, Rhodes served as the hitting coach for the Brewers' Class A affiliate Beloit Brewers. After retiring from UNF, Rhodes served as the hitting coach for the Wisconsin Timber Rattlers, the Brewers Single-A affiliate from 2011 to 2013.

=== Flagler College ===
In January 2014, Rhodes became a volunteer assistant baseball coach at Flagler College in St. Augustine, Florida.

== International coaching career ==
During his coaching career, Rhodes found time to dabble in international amateur baseball, first with the United States national baseball team and later with two different Olympic squads. He was an assistant coach for Team USA on three occasions (1993, 1994, 2001) and an assistant coach for the Australian Olympic baseball team in 1996 under Rob Derksen. He joined Derksen as a coach for the Greek national baseball team in 2002 and 2003, and was appointed the head coach of the Greek Olympic baseball team in 2004 after Derksen died unexpectedly before the Olympic Games in Athens, Greece. Rhodes also skippered the Greek national baseball team at the 2005 European Championships.

== Military service ==
Rhodes served as an enlisted soldier in the Army National Guard from 1971 to 1976 and was stationed at the Air Defense Artillery Headquarters in West Palm Beach, Fla.

== Head coaching record ==
Below is a table of Rhodes's records as a collegiate head baseball coach.

Record table
Season	Team	Overall	Conference	Standing	Postseason
Palm Beach Junior College (NJCAA) (1975–1982)
1975	Palm Beach Junior College	28-13			
1976	Palm Beach Junior College	23-18	11-11		
1977	Palm Beach Junior College	29-18	11-11		
1978	Palm Beach Junior College	31-13	12-8	2nd	
1979	Palm Beach Junior College	52-13	16-8	1st	State tournament
1980	Palm Beach Junior College	50-18	14-10	2nd	
1981	Palm Beach Junior College	44-24		4th	
1982	Palm Beach Junior College	40-10	14-7	1st	State tournament
Palm Beach Junior College:					
North Florida (Florida Conference – NAIA) (1988–1994)
1988	North Florida	47–17	18-6	1st	NAIA Area 5 playoffs
1989	North Florida	53–18	25-3	1st	NAIA World Series (3rd)
1990	North Florida	43–20	19-3	1st	District 25 playoffs
1991	North Florida	57–13	23-1	1st	NAIA World Series (3rd)
1992	North Florida	51–12	27-3	1st	NAIA Area 5 playoffs
1993	North Florida	45–12	28-4	1st	NAIA District 7 playoffs
North Florida (Sunshine State Conference – NCAA DII) (1994–1997)
1994	North Florida	33–19	15–6	2nd	NCAA Regional
1995	North Florida	36–16	15–6	1st	NCAA Regional
1996	North Florida	26–29	10–11	4th	NCAA Regional
1997	North Florida	39–17	13–8	3rd	NCAA Regional
North Florida (Peach Belt Conference – NCAA DII) (1998–2005)
1998	North Florida	32–21	15–11	2nd	NCAA Regional
1999	North Florida	43–17	22–8	1st	NCAA Regional
2000	North Florida	49–14	26–4	1st	College World Series (3rd)
2001	North Florida	47–17	26–5	1st	College World Series (3rd)
2002	North Florida	40–16	23–7	2nd	NCAA Regional
2003	North Florida	39–18	18–9	1st	NCAA Regional
2004	North Florida	41–18	23–7	1st	NCAA Regional
2005	North Florida	48–16	23–7	1st	College World Series (2nd)
North Florida (Atlantic Sun Conference – NCAA DI) (2006–2010)
2006	North Florida	34–21	20–10	2nd	Ineligible
2007	North Florida	24–32	13–14	6th	Ineligible
2008	North Florida	29–26	18–15	4th	Ineligible
2009	North Florida	23–31	15–5	T-6th	Ineligible
2010	North Florida	30–28	14–12	4th	A-Sun Tournament (1-2)
North Florida:		909–448			
Total:		1,212–566			
National champion Postseason invitational champion Conference regular season champion Conference regular season and conference tournament champion Division regular season champion Division regular season and conference tournament champion Conference tournament champion

== See also ==
- North Florida Ospreys baseball
- Palm Beach State College
- Palm Beach Lakes Community High School
