= 1966 Florida gubernatorial election =

- November 8, 1966
- Turnout: 66.50% (of registered voters)
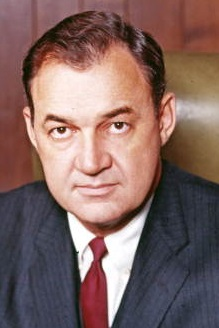

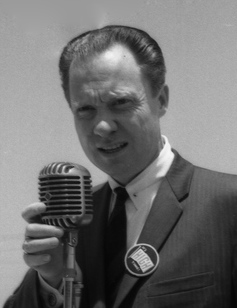
Nominee	Claude R. Kirk Jr.	Robert K. High
Party	Republican	Democratic
Popular vote	821,190	668,233
Percentage	55.13%	44.86%
- County results Kirk: 50–60% 60–70% 70–80% High: 50–60% 60–70%
Governor before election
W. Haydon Burns
Democratic
Elected Governor
Claude Roy Kirk Jr.
Republican

The 1966 Florida gubernatorial election took place on November 8, 1966. During the primary election, the results from the Democratic Party were close among three of the four candidates. Thus, the top two Democrat candidates – incumbent Governor of Florida William "Haydon" Burns and Mayor of Miami Robert King High – competed in a runoff election on May 24, 1966. In an upset outcome, Robert King High was chosen over W. Haydon Burns as the Democratic Gubernatorial nominee. In contrast, the Republican primary was rather uneventful, with businessman Claude Roy Kirk Jr. easily securing the Republican nomination against Richard Muldrew. This was the first time since 1876, and the last time until 1986, that a Republican was elected governor.

On Election Day – November 8 – Claude Kirk won the general election with 821,190 (55.13%) votes versus Robert High's 668,233 (44.86%) votes. As a result, Claude Kirk became the first Republican elected to the office of Governor of Florida since Ossian B. Hart in 1872. At the time of the election, the Florida Constitution did not include a provision allowing a lieutenant governor. However, after a new state constitution was adopted in 1968, Governor Kirk appointed Ray Osborne as Lieutenant Governor of Florida, the first to serve in that office since Milton H. Mabry in 1889. As of 2022, this is the last time that a Republican gubernatorial nominee has carried Broward County.

== Background ==
Democratic Haydon Burns, who won the gubernatorial election in 1964, was up for re-election. Although gubernatorial elections in Florida are normally every four years, the cycle of gubernatorial elections was changed so as not to coincide with presidential election years. Thus, the Governor of Florida elected in 1964 would serve from January 5, 1965 to January 3, 1967, while the next term would last from January 3, 1967 – January 5, 1971.

== Democratic nomination ==
=== Candidates ===
- Haydon Burns, incumbent governor
- Sam Foor
- Robert King High, Mayor of Miami and candidate for governor in 1964
- Scott Kelly, State Senator from Lakeland and candidate for governor in 1964

=== Campaign ===
In September 1965, a poll with a sample size exceeding 3,000 people indicated Governor Haydon Burns had an approval rating of 75%. However, by March 1966, the Governor's approval rating fell to 56%, due to Burns' alleged dishonesty, lack of integrity, and showing favoritism. In that same "confidential" poll Robert High surprisingly led Haydon Burns by 34%-28.5%, while Scott Kelly received 18.5% and 19% were left undecided. Due to the "stunning" results this poll conducted by Haydon Burns' campaign managers, they attempted to cover it up. By the end of November, the three major Democratic candidates in 1964 all announced their intention to run for governor in 1966, which were incumbent governor Haydon Burns, Mayor of Miami Robert King, and State Senator Scott Kelly. Additionally, it was speculated that former governor Thomas "LeRoy" Collins would also challenge Burns in the primary, but instead ran for United States Senate in 1968. Eventually a fourth person, Tallahassee publisher Sam Foor, decided to enter the race, though he was not considered a "serious contender".

28.3% of the voting age population participated in the Democratic primary. Both the Democratic and Republican primary election took place on May 3, 1966. The results of the Democratic primary were Haydon Burns with 372,451 votes (35.35%), Robert High with 338,281 votes (32.11%), Scott Kelly with 331,580 votes (31.47%), and Sam Foor with 11,343 votes (1.08%). Because none of the four candidates received at a majority of votes, a runoff election was held between Haydon Burns and Robert King, the top two candidates, on May 24, 1966. After the run-off election, Robert High defeated Haydon Burns by a margin of 596,471-509,271 (53.94%-46.065). Thus, Robert King High was the Democratic nominee for the 1966 gubernatorial election in Florida.

=== Results ===
Democratic Primary Runoff by county High: 50–60%; 60–70%; 70–80%; 80–90%; Burns: 50–60%; 60–70%; 70–80%

Democratic primary - May 3, 1966
Party	Candidate	Votes	%
Democratic	Haydon Burns (incumbent)	372,451	35.35
Democratic	Robert King High	338,281	32.11
Democratic	Scott Kelly	331,580	31.47
Democratic	Sam Foor	11,343	1.08
Total votes		1,053,655	100.00%

Democratic primary runoff - May 24, 1966
Party	Candidate	Votes	%
Democratic	Robert King High	596,471	53.94
Democratic	Haydon Burns (incumbent)	509,271	46.06
Total votes		1,105,742	100.00%

== Republican nomination ==
=== Candidates ===
- Claude Kirk, Businessman and Republican nominee for U.S. Senate in 1964
- Richard Muldrew, Brevard County commissioner

3.5% of the voting age population participated in the Republican primary.

=== Results ===
Republican primary - May 3, 1966
Party	Candidate	Votes	%
Republican	Claude Roy Kirk	100,838	80.81
Republican	Richard Muldrew	23,953	19.91
Total votes		124,791	100.00%

== General election ==
After a bitter Democratic primary election, defeated incumbent governor Haydon Burns refused to endorse nominee Robert High. However, High was able to draw endorsements from major Florida newspapers, labor unions, and other Democratic politicians in Florida. High made unpopular proposals, such as a severance tax on phosphate and tightening the sales tax on all products except food and drugs. Republican nominee Claude Kirk promised to veto new taxes and abolish a program calling for several millions of dollars in additional taxation. Kirk also noted that a vote for him would be a vote against inflation and warned voters about the "Johnson–Humphrey-High Administration". The general election campaign was described as "dreary", with a projected voter turnout of less than 65%.

=== Results ===
1966 Florida gubernatorial election
Party	Candidate	Votes	%
Republican	Claude Roy Kirk	821,190	55.13
Democratic	Robert King High	668,233	44.86
	Scattering	238	0.02
Majority		152,957	10.27
Turnout		1,489,661	
Republican gain from Democratic			

== Bibliography ==
- Congressional Elections, 1946-1996. Washington, D.C.: Congressional Quarterly Inc. 1998. ISBN 1-56802-248-4.
- Scammon, Richard M., ed. (1968). America Votes 7: a handbook of contemporary American election statistics, 1966. Washington, D.C.: Governmental Affairs Institute.
- Steed, Robert; Moreland, Laurence; Baker, Tod, eds. (1980). Party Politics in the South. Praeger Publishers. ISBN 0030565863.

== See also ==
- Democratic Party (United States)
- Republican Party (United States)
