= William Jackson Creel =

American politician

17th and 26th Mayor of Eau Gallie, Florida
- In office 1913–1915
- Preceded by: George Paddison
- Succeeded by: H.W. Mullins
- In office May 1950 – December 1950
- Preceded by: John Martin Law, Jr
- Succeeded by: William Lansing Gleason

Member of the Florida House of Representatives from Brevard County
- In office 1927–1929
- Preceded by: Jesse Jackson Parrish
- Succeeded by: Clyde G. Trammell

Personal details
- Born: April 11, 1881 Georgia, US
- Died: November 8, 1970 (aged 89) Brevard County, Florida, US
- Party: Democratic
- Spouse: Jessie Brown (m. ca. 1907)
- Children: 4
- Occupation: physician

William Jackson Creel (April 11, 1881 – November 8, 1970) was a three-term Democratic mayor of Eau Gallie, Florida, from 1913 to 1915 and from May 1950 to December 1950. He was a member of the Florida House of Representatives in 1927.

He was the trustee, along with William H. H. Gleason of the Eau Gallie School and Eau Gallie Junior and Senior High School. Dr. W. J. Creel Elementary School, in the Eau Gallie area of Melbourne, Florida, is named after him. In 1955, the main bridge of the Eau Gallie Causeway was named for him. Creel Street in the Eau Gallie area of Melbourne, Florida is also named after him.

== See also ==
- List of members of the Florida House of Representatives from Brevard County, Florida

Preceded by George Paddison	Mayor of Eau Gallie, Florida; 1913–1915	Succeeded by H.W. Mullins
Preceded by Jesse Jackson Parrish	Member of the Florida House of Representatives; 1927–1929	Succeeded by Clyde G. Trammell
Preceded by John Martin Law, Jr	Mayor of Eau Gallie, Florida; May 1950–December 1950	Succeeded by William Lansing Gleason
