= Kristen Arrington =

Florida State Senator and Business Owner

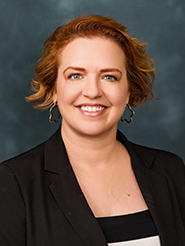
- Official portrait, 2024

Member of the Florida Senate from the 25th district
- Incumbent
- Assumed office November 5, 2024
- Preceded by: Vic Torres

Member of the Florida House of Representatives
- In office November 3, 2020 – November 5, 2024
- Preceded by: John Cortes
- Succeeded by: Jose Alvarez
- Constituency: 43rd district (2020–2022); 46th district (2022–2024)

Personal details
- Born: Kristen Aston; August 22, 1975 (age 51) Holiday, Florida, U.S.
- Party: Democratic
- Spouse: Brandon Arrington
- Education: Valencia College (AA)

Kristen Aston Arrington (born August 22, 1975) is an American politician serving as a Democratic member of the Florida Senate from the 25th district since 2024.

She previously served in the Florida House of Representatives from 2020-2024.

== Early life and education ==
Arrington was born in Holiday, Florida and graduated from Osceola High School. She has an Associate of Arts degree in political science and government from Valencia College.

== Career ==
Arrington has her Florida Real Estate Sales license and worked as a property manager previously. She worked for the Transportation and Expressway Authority Membership of Florida before she founded her company, Pitbull Strategies, a consulting firm, and social media marketing company.

== Personal life ==
She is married to her husband, Brandon Arrington, a member of the Osceola County Commission since 2008. Brandon's mother, Mary Jane Arrington, has been the Osceola County Supervisor of Elections since 2008, having previously served on the county commission.
