= Palm Beach Lakes Community High School =

Public high school in West Palm Beach, Florida, United States

Location
- 3505 Shiloh Drive; West Palm Beach, Florida 33407; United States; 26°45′15″N 80°06′20″W

Information
- Type: Public High School
- Established: 1989
- School district: School District of Palm Beach County
- School number: 1851
- Principal: Rosalind Gray McCray
- Faculty: 120.10 (FTE)
- Grades: 9–12
- Enrollment: 2,783 (2023-2024)
- Student to teacher ratio: 23.17
- Colors: Maroon, white and gray
- Slogan: A New Tradition
- Nickname: Rams
- Publication: Modern Graffiti
- Newspaper: Kaleidoscope
- Yearbook: Aquarian
- Website: School website

Palm Beach Lakes Community High School, also known as Lakes or PBL, is a coeducational public high school located in the Palm Beach Lakes community of West Palm Beach, Florida. It is under the jurisdiction of the School District of Palm Beach County. The school has the Teacher's Academy Program and serves as the Law Magnet for the entire county.

Once having an enrollment of over 3,500, Palm Beach Lakes was once one of the largest schools in its district. However, due to Florida's Class Size Amendment and the continuous building of high schools in the district, Palm Beach Lakes has a school enrollment of just over 3,000. However, it still remains one of the largest high schools in South Florida.

== History ==
Palm Beach Lakes Community High School was established in 1989 after the closing of Twin Lakes High School (a merging of Palm Beach High School and Roosevelt High School) in downtown West Palm Beach.

Central School was the first school on "The Hill," built in 1908 to replace a four-room schoolhouse located a half-mile to the northeast, at Clematis Street and Dixie Highway. Parents at the time worried about sending their children so far out of town into the wilderness, and residents wondered if the town would ever grow into the school. It did. A new high school building — Palm Beach High School — opened there in 1915. A third building was added in 1922, and a fourth in 1927. In 1970 the school changed its name to Twin Lakes, which closed in June 1988. It briefly operated as Palm Beach Lakes High until that school's new campus opened in 1989.

Palm Beach High School served as the original site of Palm Beach Junior College, now Palm Beach State College. County school superintendent Joe Youngblood and Howell Watkins, the principal of Palm Beach High School who later became the college's first dean, were instrumental in opening the college. The college's initial goal was to provide additional training to local high school graduates who were unable to find jobs during the Great Depression. PBJC was founded in 1933 and is the oldest community college in the state of Florida.

At the start of the 1970–1971 school year, Palm Beach High School merged with Roosevelt High School forming Twin Lakes High School. The latter, Roosevelt High, was established as the high school for African Americans in West Palm Beach. They were athletic rivals with John F. Kennedy High School, the High School for African-Americans in Riviera Beach. During integration, this school would go on to become part of Suncoast Community High School. However, the school maintained its original location and became John F. Kennedy Jr. High School, later becoming a middle school serving grades 6–8. Roosevelt High was located at the site of the current Roosevelt Service Center, on the Northwest corner of Tamarind Avenue and L. A. Kirksey Street (15th Street). This site would also become known as Roosevelt Junior High School in the 1960s.

The name of the new school was Twin Lakes High School, derived from the fact that the merging of the schools had integrated them, and also that the new school setting was diverse with differing groups of ethnicities merging into a future that was united. Logic suggests the school's new name referred to the adjoining lakes west of downtown: Lake Mangonia, near Roosevelt, and Clear Lake, near Palm Beach High. The site was located in Downtown West Palm Beach at the current Dreyfoos School of the Arts site. Palm Beach High School then ceased to exist, as did Roosevelt High School.

During the 1988–89 school year, another historical high school in West Palm Beach, North Shore High School (notable alumni include Derek Harper), merged with Twin Lakes High School. However, the name of this merger became Palm Beach Lakes High School. The site of the new Palm Beach Lakes High School, located at its current location at the intersection of Military Trail and 45th Street in West Palm Beach, was not completed until midway through the school year. Once completed midway through the school year, all of the Palm Beach Lakes High School students, faculty, and staff moved to their new campus.

The physical structure of Twin Lakes High School was closed and was due to be demolished once Palm Beach Lakes High School officially opened. It was only by heroic efforts by PBHS Alumni that the buildings were saved and subsequently repurposed as Dreyfoos School of the Arts. Similar efforts from North Shore High School's alumni helped save their old school from destruction. Today, Bak Middle School of the Arts is located on the former campus of North Shore High School.

Graduates of Palm Beach High School have never considered themselves to be anything but proud PBHS Wildcats and trophies and other memorabilia are now stored in a small museum in downtown West Palm Beach.

== Sports ==
The school's major sports rivals are Palm Beach Gardens Community High School, William T. Dwyer High School, and Suncoast Community High School.

- Baseball – Men 6A
- Basketball – Men and Women 6A (Varsity, Junior Varsity, and Freshman)
- Bowling – Men and Women
- Cheerleading – (Varsity, Junior Varsity, and Freshman)
- Football – 6A (Varsity, Junior Varsity, and Freshman)
- Flag Football – Women
- Golf – Men and Women
- Tennis – Men and Women
- Track and Field – Men and Women 4A
- Soccer – Men and Women (Varsity and Junior Varsity)
- Softball – Women 6A
- Swimming – Men and Women (Varsity)
- Volleyball – Men and Women (Varsity and Junior Varsity)
- Wrestling – Men and Women (Varsity, Junior Varsity, and Freshman)

Palm Beach Lakes holds an annual basketball tournament, known as the Derek Harper Holiday Tournament. It is named after the retired NBA guard Derek Harper,. Teams from Palm Beach, Broward, and Miami-Dade counties participate in the tournament which draws thousands each year. The event is held the week after Christmas for 4 days.

== Notable alumni ==
- Jarrett Brown – quarterback for the San Francisco 49ers
- Palmer Collins – politician
- Dick Howser – former Major League Baseball player and manager
- Ken Johnson - former Major League Baseball pitcher
- Malcolm Knowles – adult educator
- Jeremy Lewis – professional football offensive lineman
- Tommylee Lewis – professional football wide receiver
- Eddie Lovett – hurdler
- Scott Lusader – former Major League Baseball player; Detroit Tigers 1987–1990, New York Yankees 1991
- John Michaels - sports talk show radio host
- Fabrice Noël – Haitian international soccer player
- Justin Pope – professional baseball pitcher and coach
- Burt Reynolds – actor
- Dusty Rhodes (baseball coach), college and Olympic baseball coach
- Rice Brothers – Local businessmen; former holders of the world record for being the shortest living twins
- Laquincy Rideau – professional basketball player
- Mia Starr – drag queen and dancer
- Vinny Sutherland – former NFL player
- Brandon Thompkins – professional football wide receiver
