= John Long (Florida politician) =

American politician (1946–2005)

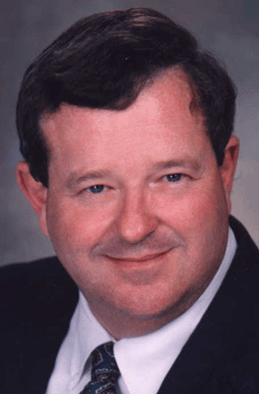

Pasco County Superintendent of Schools
- In office September 3, 1996 – November 22, 2004
- Preceded by: Tom Weightman
- Succeeded by: Heather Fiorentino

Member of the Florida House of Representatives
- In office November 4, 1986 – November 8, 1994
- Preceded by: Ray Stewart
- Succeeded by: Mike Fasano
- Constituency: 48th district (1986–1992); 45th district (1992–1994)

Personal details
- Born: September 20, 1946 Wauchula, Florida
- Died: October 26, 2005 (aged 59) Glasgow, Montana
- Party: Democratic
- Spouse: Marsha Young
- Children: 2
- Education: University of South Florida (B.A., M.A., Ph.D.)
- Occupation: School administrator

John Long (September 20, 1946 – October 26, 2005) was a Democratic politician from Florida who served as a member of the Florida House of Representatives from 1986 to 1994 and as Pasco County Superintendent of Schools from 1996 to 2004.

== Early life ==
Long was born in Wauchula, Florida, in 1946, and graduated from Hardee High School. He attended the University of South Florida, graduating with his bachelor's degree in psychology in 1968, and taught in Manatee County public schools while his wife completed her nursing degree. Long returned to USF to earn his master's degree in education in 1970 and doctorate in 1976. Long was hired by Pasco County Superintendent Tom Weightman as the district's personnel director in 1976, and helped resolve ongoing disputes between teachers and the school district. He was appointed assistant superintendent of schools in 1977.

== Florida House of Representatives ==
On May 25, 1986, State Representative Ray Stewart died, and Long ran to succeed him in the 48th district. He won the Democratic nomination over former county school board member Betty Thompson, winning 66 percent of the vote to her 34 percent.

Long was re-elected unopposed in 1988 and 1990. In 1992, following redistricting, he ran for re-election in the 45th district, and was re-elected unopposed.

== Pasco County Superintendent of Schools ==
In 1994, Long announced that he would not seek re-election to the State House, and instead would run for Pasco County Superintendent of Schools in 1996, or seek an appointment to the position if voters opted to make it appointed. After voters rejected a measure to make the office appointed, Long ran in 1996, and was elected unopposed. After Weightman, the outgoing superintendent, retired from the position early, Governor Lawton Chiles appointed him as Weightman's successor, and he was sworn in by Lieutenant Governor Buddy MacKay on September 3. He was re-elected without opposition in 2000. Long declined to seek re-election in 2004.

== Death ==
On October 26, 2005, died of a heart attack while vacationing with his wife in Montana.
