= J. Keith Arnold =

American politician

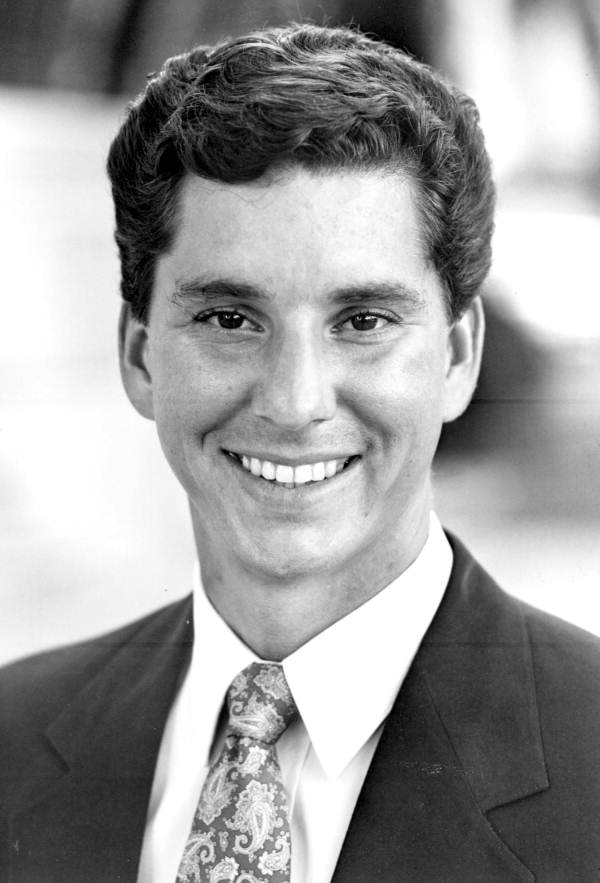

Member of the Florida House of Representatives from the 73rd district
- In office November 2, 1982 – November 3, 1998
- Preceded by: Thomas Danson, Jr.
- Succeeded by: Bruce Kyle

Personal details
- Born: July 21, 1959 (age 67) Fort Myers, Florida, U.S.
- Party: Democratic
- Education: Florida State University

J. Keith Arnold (born July 21, 1959) is a former member of the Florida House of Representatives representing the 73rd district from 1982 to 1998. He was born in Fort Myers, Florida. He received his Bachelor's degree from the Florida State University in 1981. He lives in Fort Myers, Florida with his family.
