= John Renke =

American politician (born 1946)

Member of the Florida House of Representatives
- In office November 6, 1984 – November 6, 1990
- Preceded by: Ron Richmond
- Succeeded by: Phil Mishkin

Personal details
- Born: January 17, 1946 (age 80) Detroit, Michigan
- Party: Republican
- Spouse: Margaret Rogers
- Children: 2
- Education: University of Michigan (B.A.); Wayne State University Law School (J.D.)
- Occupation: Attorney

John K. Renke II (born January 17, 1946) is a Republican politician from Florida who served as a member of the Florida House of Representatives from 1984 to 1990. He succeeded Republican legislator Ron Richmond in the Florida House following the 1984 election.

Renke served three terms in the Florida House of Representatives and became a leader within the House Republican caucus. During the 1990 election, he was defeated by Democratic candidate Phil Mishkin in what was considered an upset victory.

Renke's son, John Renke III, later served as a judge in Florida.
