= Clifford McNulty =

American politician (1930–2018)

Clifford A. McNulty
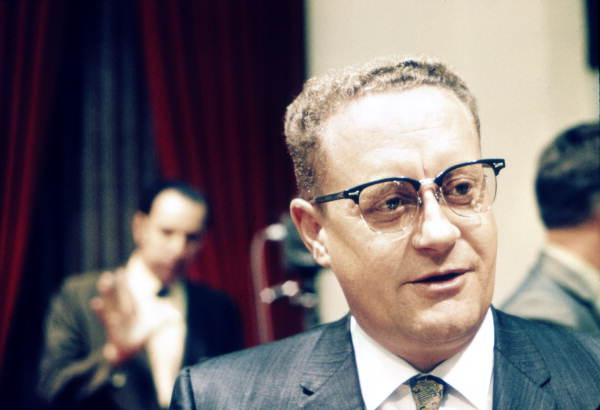

Member of the Florida House of Representatives from the 73rd district
- In office March 28, 1967 – November 3, 1970
- Preceded by: James H. Pruitt
- Succeeded by: Jane Robinson

Personal details
- Born: December 25, 1930 Palm Bay, Florida, U.S.
- Died: March 7, 2018 (aged 87) Melbourne, Florida, U.S.
- Party: Republican
- Children: four
- Education: University of Florida

Clifford A. McNulty (December 25, 1930 – March 7, 2018) was an American politician who was a member of the Florida House of Representatives representing the 73rd district from 1967 to 1970.

== Life and career ==
Clifford A. McNulty was born on December 25, 1930, as the son of Chester McNulty and Jennie May Larson Limmer McNulty. He was an alternate delegate to Republican National Convention from Florida, in 1960, and 1964. McNulty died in Melbourne, Florida on March 7, 2018, at the age of 87.

Florida House of Representatives
| Preceded by James H. Pruitt | Member of the Florida House of Representatives from the 73rd district 1967–1970 | Succeeded by Jane Robinson |
