= Jose Alvarez (Florida politician) =

American politician (born 1964)

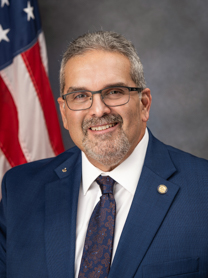

Member of the Florida House of Representatives from the 46th district
- Incumbent
- Assumed office November 5, 2024
- Preceded by: Kristen Arrington

Mayor of Kissimmee, Florida
- In office November 2016 – November 2020

Personal details
- Born: August 11, 1964 (age 61) Havana, Cuba
- Party: Democratic

Jose Alvarez is an American politician who has served as a Democratic member of the Florida House of Representatives; representing the 46th district since 2024.

He ran for the Florida House of Representatives in 2010 as a Tea Party Candidate and lost.

He ran for the Osceola County Commission in 2020 as a Democratic candidate and lost.
