= Granville Crabtree =

American politician (1929–2024)

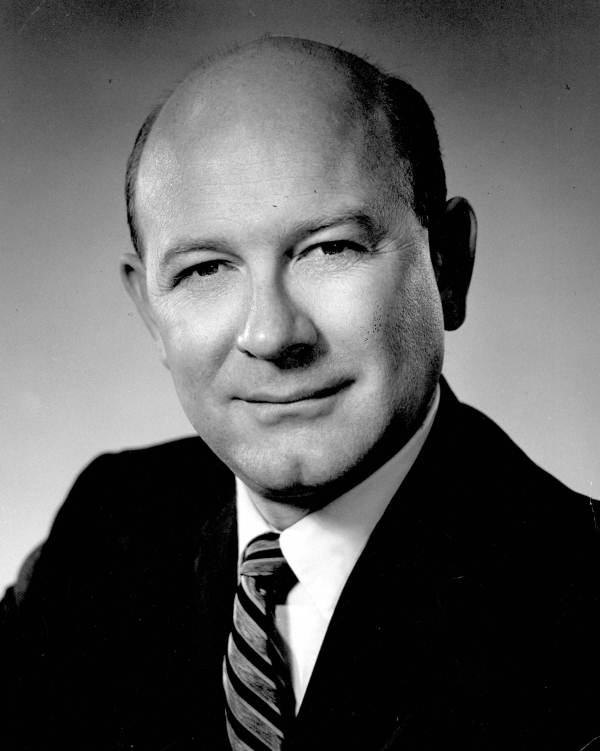
- Crabtree in 1968

Member of the Florida House of Representatives from the 73rd district
- In office November 7, 1972 – November 2, 1976
- Preceded by: Jane Robinson
- Succeeded by: Thomas Danson Jr.

Member of the Florida House of Representatives from the 119th district
- In office 1967 – November 7, 1972
- Preceded by: district created
- Succeeded by: Jeff Gautier

Member of the Florida House of Representatives from the Sarasota district
- In office 1966–1967

Personal details
- Born: November 29, 1929 Chattanooga, Tennessee, U.S.
- Died: August 4, 2024 (aged 94)
- Party: Republican
- Spouse: Patricia Paulette Vitrier Schindler
- Children: Michelle, John G.
- Education: University of California, University of Missouri, George Washington University

Granville Hayward Crabtree, Jr. (November 29, 1929 – August 4, 2024) was an American attorney and politician in the state of Florida.

Crabtree was born in Chattanooga, Tennessee, in 1929. He enlisted in the United States Army and, at the rank of captain, served in Europe and Korea from 1948 to 1953. He moved to Florida in 1956. He attended the University of California, Berkeley, University of Missouri, and George Washington University to receive his B.S. and LL.B degrees. He is a member of the Lambda Chi Alpha fraternity. He was a student traffic court judge while in university.

From 1961 to 1962, he served as an attorney on the Sarasota County Planning Commission, Sarasota County Tax Assessor and for the city of North Port Charlotte. He was elected to the Florida House of Representatives as a Republican for Sarasota County in 1966 and served until 1976.

He was married to Paulette Vitrier of Sarasota and has two children, Michelle and John. He was a member of the American Bar Association.

Crabtree died on August 4, 2024, at the age of 94.
