= James H. Pruitt =

American politician and real estate broker

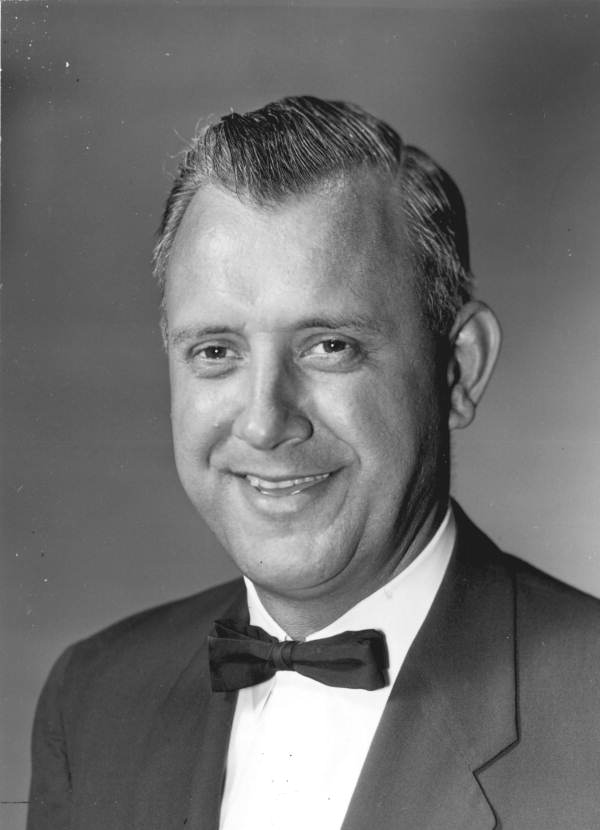
- Pruitt in 1961

31st Mayor of Eau Gallie, Florida
- In office December 1956 – 1957
- Preceded by: Langdon Goodyear, Jr.
- Succeeded by: Milton McGrath

Member of the Florida House of Representatives from Brevard County
- In office 1959–1967
- Preceded by: Richard Muldrew
- Succeeded by: Clifford McNulty

Personal details
- Born: December 16, 1917 Georgia
- Died: July 19, 2002 (aged 84) Florida
- Party: Democratic
- Spouse: Mary A. Law (m. March 13, 1938)
- Children: Lonnie Pruitt
- Occupation: real estate broker

James H. Pruitt (December 16, 1917 – July 19, 2002) served as the one-term mayor of Eau Gallie, Florida from 1956 to 1957. He was also a member of the Florida House of Representatives from 1959 to 1967, during which time he served alongside Jim Dressler.

In 1954, he founded Pruitt Real Estate.

== Legacy ==
In 2004, the Florida Legislature dedicated the bridge which spans the Sebastian Inlet, connecting Indian River County to Brevard County the James H. Pruitt Memorial Bridge

== See also ==
- List of members of the Florida House of Representatives from Brevard County, Florida

Preceded by Langdon Goodyear, Jr.	Mayor of Eau Gallie, Florida; 1956–1957	Succeeded by Milton McGrath
Preceded by Richard Muldrew	Member of the Florida House of Representatives; 1959–1967	Succeeded by Clifford McNulty
