= Jane Robinson (politician) =

American politician

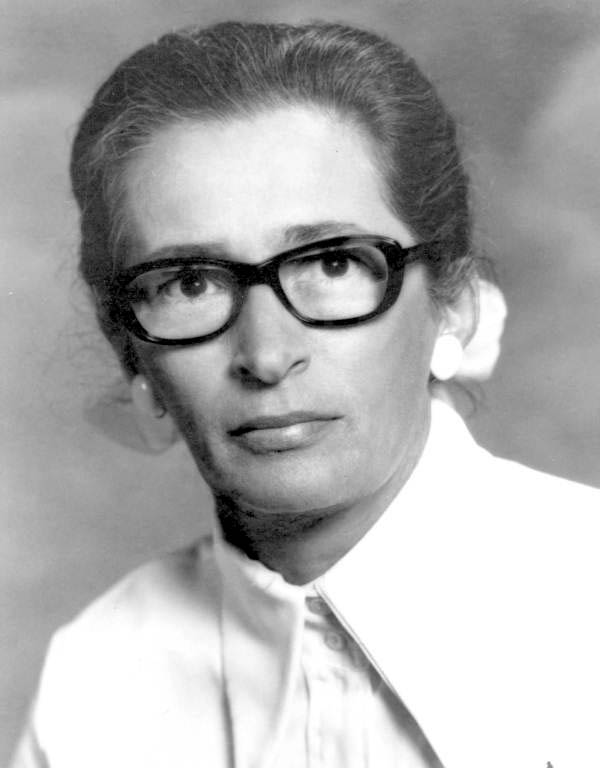

Member of the Florida House of Representatives from the 73rd district
- In office November 3, 1970 – November 7, 1972
- Preceded by: Clifford McNulty
- Succeeded by: Granville H. Crabtree, Jr.

Member of the Florida House of Representatives from the 46th district
- In office November 7, 1972 – 1976
- Preceded by: John J. Savage
- Succeeded by: Marilyn Evans-Jones

Personal details
- Born: June 22, 1926 Oklahoma City, Oklahoma
- Died: August 21, 2001 (aged 75)
- Party: Republican
- Children: Janie, Mike, Laurie and Tim
- Education: University of Oklahoma
- Occupation: News reporter, housewife, pilot

Jane W. Robinson (June 22, 1926 – August 21, 2001) was a member of the Florida House of Representatives representing the 73rd district from 1970 to 1972 and the 46th district from 1972 to 1976.

Preceded by Clifford McNulty	Member of the Florida House of Representatives from the 73rd district 1970–1972	Succeeded by Granville H. Crabtree, Jr.
Preceded by John J. Savage	Member of the Florida House of Representatives from the 46th district 1972–1976	Succeeded by Marilyn Evans-Jones
