= Jim Russell (footballer) =

Scottish footballer (1916–1994)

Personal information
- Full name: James Walker Russell
- Date of birth: 14 September 1916
- Place of birth: Edinburgh, Scotland
- Date of death: 17 August 1994 (aged 77)
- Place of death: Florida, U.S.
- Height: 5 ft 9 in (1.75 m)
- Position: Inside forward

Youth career
- 1931–1932: Craigmer Juveniles
- 1932–1933: Murrayfield Amateurs

Senior career*
Years	Team	Apps	(Gls)
1935–1938	Sunderland	5	(0)
1938–1946	Norwich City	12	(2)
1946–1948	Crystal Palace	43	(6)
1948–1949	New Brighton	24	(1)
1949–19??	Fleetwood		
- * Club domestic league appearances and goals

James Walker Russell (14 September 1916 – 17 August 1994) was a Scottish professional footballer who played as an inside forward for Sunderland.
