= William G. Akridge =

American judge, lawyer and politician

Mayor of Cocoa, Florida
- In office 1938–1941

Member of the Florida House of Representatives from Brevard County
- In office 1951–1953

Personal details
- Born: November 11, 1906 Mitchell County, Georgia, U.S.
- Died: May 22, 2000 (aged 93)
- Party: Democratic
- Spouse: Grace Elizabeth Strange (m. 1931)
- Relatives: Noah B. Butt (stepfather)
- Education: University of Florida

William G. Akridge (November 11, 1906 – May 22, 2000) was an American judge, lawyer and politician. He served as a Democratic member of the Florida House of Representatives.

== Life and career ==
Akridge was born November 11, 1906 in Mitchell County, Georgia. He went to Cocoa High School and then went on to obtain a law degree from the University of Florida in 1930. He started working at the law practice Butt & Akridge Cocoa with his stepfather.

Akridge married Grace Elizabeth Strange in April 1931.

Akridge was elected as Mayor of Cocoa in 1938 and served for four terms until 1941, when he resigned to serve in the United States Navy during World War II. After the war, he returned to his law firm and served as an attorney for the Board of Brevard County Commissioners and for the city of Rockledge, Florida.

Akridge served in the Florida House of Representatives from 1951 to 1953. He then served as a circuit court judge for the 18th Judicial Circuit from 1959 to 1975.

Akridge died May 22, 2000, at the age of 93.
