= Florida's 46th House of Representatives district =

American legislative district

Florida's 46th State House of Representatives district
Representative
Jose Alvarez; D–Kissimmee
- Registration: 67.6% Democratic; 30.6% Republican; 1.8% No party preference
- Demographics: 19.4% White; 17.9% Black; 60.3% Hispanic; 4.5% Asian; 1.9% Native American; 0.3% Hawaiian/Pacific Islander
- Population (2020): 176,200

Florida's 46th House district elects one member of the Florida House of Representatives. Its current representative is Democrat Jose Alvarez. The district includes areas south of Orlando, including Kissimmee and Poinciana.

== Representatives from 1967 to the present ==
Representative	Party	Years of service	Hometown	Notes
John J. Savage	Republican	1967–1972		Redistricted to the 57th district
Jane Robinson	Republican	1972–1976	Cocoa	Resigned
Marilyn Evans-Jones	Democratic	1976–1982	Melbourne	Redistricted to the 33rd district
Everett Kelly	Democratic	1982–1992		Served as Speaker Pro Tempore (1990,1992); Redistricted to the 42nd district
Phil Mishkin	Democratic	1992–1994		
Debra Prewitt	Democratic	1994–1998		
Heather Fiorentino	Republican	1998–2004		
John Legg	Republican	2004–2012	Port Richey	Served as Speaker Pro Tempore (2010-2012)
Bruce Antone	Democratic	2012–2022	Orlando	Redistricted to the 41st district
Kristen Arrington	Democratic	2022-2024	Kissimmee	Retired to run for state senate
Jose Alvarez	Democratic	2024 - present	Kissimmee	

== See also ==
- List of members of the Florida House of Representatives from Brevard County, Florida
