= James Russell (Australian footballer) =

Australian rules footballer

Personal information
- Full name: James William Russell
- Born: 1 August 1931; Carlton North, Victoria
- Died: 12 March 1969 (aged 37); Parkville, Victoria
- Original team: Brunswick-Coburg Boys Club
- Height: 180 cm (5 ft 11 in)
- Weight: 74 kg (163 lb)

Playing career^{1}
| Years | Club | Games (Goals) |
| 1954–58 | North Melbourne | 34 (3) |
- ^{1} Playing statistics correct to the end of 1958.

James William Russell (1 August 1931 – 12 March 1969) was an Australian rules footballer who played with North Melbourne in the Victorian Football League (VFL).
