= Phil Mishkin =

American politician (1915–1995)

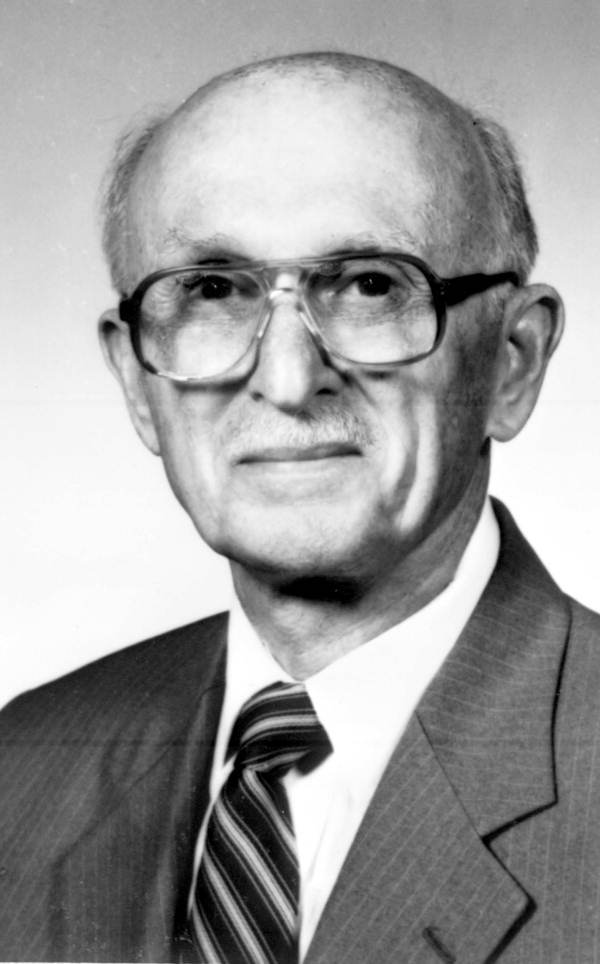

Member of the Florida House of Representatives from the 46th district
- In office November 6, 1990 – November 8, 1994
- Preceded by: John Renke
- Succeeded by: Debra Prewitt

Personal details
- Born: May 5, 1915 New York City, New York
- Died: September 1, 1995 (aged 80) Port Richey, Florida
- Party: Democratic
- Spouse: Lucille Rosenzweig
- Education: Rutgers University
- Occupation: Machinist

Philip Mishkin (May 5, 1915 – September 1, 1995) was a Democratic politician from Florida who served as a member of the Florida House of Representatives from the 46th district from 1990 to 1994. He advocated for universal healthcare. He and his wife moved to Florida from New Jersey.

Mishkin won an upset victory in the 1990 election defeating Republican House leader John Renke. He served two terms in the Florida House and retired in 1994. He died on September 1, 1995.
