= James Russell III =

American atmospheric scientist

James M. Russell III is an atmospheric scientist who has served as the developer of instrumentation for several NASA probes. He is currently a professor of Planetary and Atmospheric Sciences and co-director of the Center for Atmospheric research at Hampton University.

Russell was born in Newport News, Virginia. He received a BSEE degree from Virginia Tech in 1962. He received an MSEE degree from the University of Virginia in 1966 and a Ph.D. in aeronomy from the University of Michigan in 1970.

In 1960 Russell and his wife Jenna joined the Church of Jesus Christ of Latter-day Saints. He has served in many callings in the LDS church including Bishop, Stake President and Regional Representative.

Russell led the team that first identified the connection between chlorine and ozone gas depletion.

Russell was the lead investigator connected with a satellite to study ice in part of the Earth's atmosphere.
