= James Russell (Canadian judge) =

Judge of the Federal Court of Canada
- Incumbent
- Assumed office July 2, 2003

Personal details
- Born: December 28, 1949 (age 76) County Durham, England

James Russell (born December 28, 1949) is a judge currently serving on the Federal Court of Canada.
