= O. L. Burton =

American politician

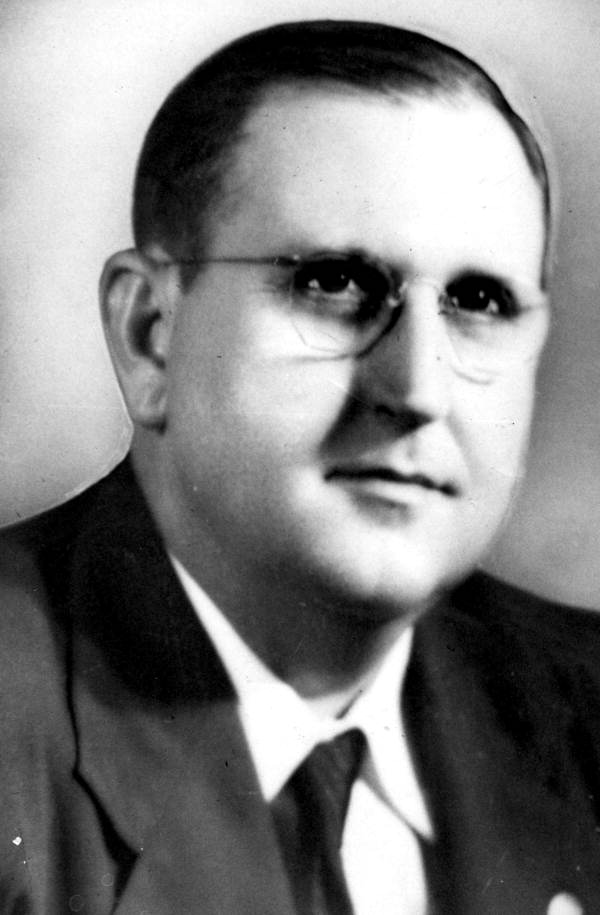

Member of the Florida House of Representatives
- In office 1947–1957

Personal details
- Born: December 19, 1906 Hazel, Kentucky
- Died: September 18, 1971 (aged 64) Brevard County, Florida
- Party: Democratic
- Spouse: Edith
- Occupation: lumber and building material dealer

Otho Liston Burton (December 19, 1906 – September 18, 1971) was an American politician in the state of Florida.

Burton was from Hazel, Kentucky and moved to Florida in 1925. A lumber and building material dealer, he served in the Florida House of Representatives from 1947 to 1957 (77th district).
