= Lemuel Curtis Crofton =

American politician

Member of the Florida House of Representatives from Washington County
- In office 1921

Member of the Florida House of Representatives from Brevard County
- In office 1943

Personal details
- Born: April 24, 1889
- Died: April 25, 1975 (aged 86)
- Party: Democratic

Lemuel Curtis Crofton (April 24, 1889 – April 25, 1975) was an American politician. He served as a Democratic member of the Florida House of Representatives.
