= James L. Russell =

American politician

Member of the U.S. House of Representatives from Missouri's 6th district

Missouri House of Representatives
- In office 1975–1983

Personal details
- Born: 1938 Savannah, Missouri, US
- Died: 2017 (aged 78–79)
- Resting place: Columbarium of Riverview Cemetery in Jefferson City, Missouri
- Party: Democratic
- Spouse(s): Kathryn Carter, Mary Rhodes
- Children: 3
- Occupation: grain and livestock farmer

James L. Russell (September 13, 1938 - March 21, 2017) was an American Democratic politician who served in the Missouri House of Representatives. He was born in Savannah, Missouri, and was educated at Savannah High School and the University of Missouri-Columbia. On September 14, 1963, he married Kathryn Carter at Marshall, Missouri. On November 25, 1995, he married Mary Rhodes. After serving as a state representative, he became president of Missouri Agribusiness Association, a trade organization of agribusinesses.
