= Jim Dressler =

American judge and politician

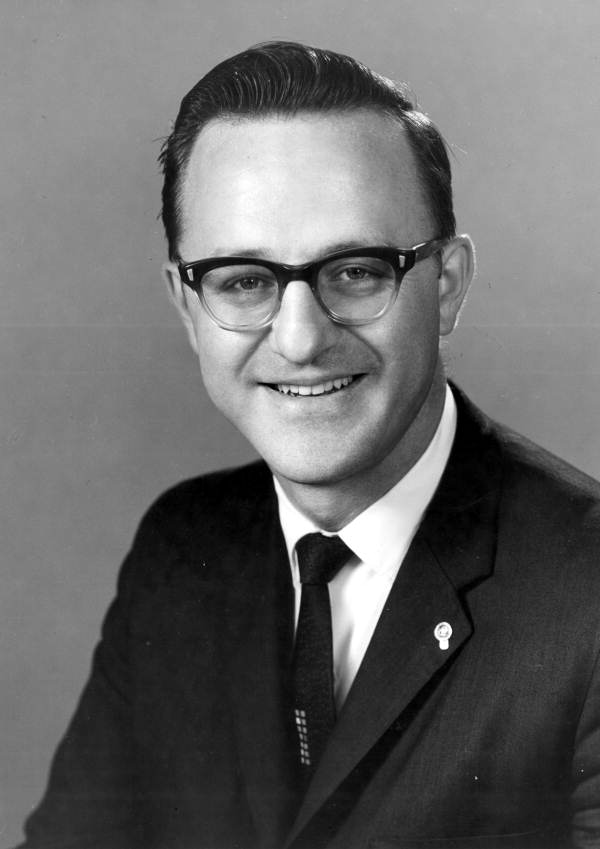
- Dressler in 1963

Member of the Florida House of Representatives from Brevard County
- In office 1963–1965 Serving with James H. Pruitt
- Preceded by: James H. Pruitt
- Succeeded by: William H. Roundtree

Member of the Florida Senate from the 37th district
- In office 1965–1966

Personal details
- Born: James R. Dressler; September 18, 1932 Millersburg, Pennsylvania, U.S.
- Died: November 17, 2018 (aged 86) Merritt Island, Florida, U.S.
- Party: Democratic
- Spouse: Florence Dressler (m. 1966)
- Children: 5
- Education: University of Florida; University of Florida Levin College of Law
- Occupation: Judge

James R. Dressler (September 18, 1932 – November 17, 2018) was an American judge and politician. He served as a Democratic member of the Florida House of Representatives, and as a member for the 37th district of the Florida Senate.

== Life and career ==
Born in Millersburg, Pennsylvania, and was raised in Greenville, South Carolina and Jacksonville, Florida. He went to Robert E. Lee High School, graduating in 1950. He then attended University of Florida, where he earned a Bachelor of Arts degree in political science in 1953. In 1956 he received a law degree at the University of Florida Levin College of Law.

Dressler worked as a lawyer, and was appointed to serve as a judge of the Small Claims Court in 1960. In 1963, Dressler was elected to the Florida House of Representatives, then, in 1965, he was elected to represent the 37th district in the Florida Senate.

Dressler died in November 2018 at his home in Merritt Island, Florida, at the age of 86.
