= William H. Roundtree =

American politician (1921-2000)

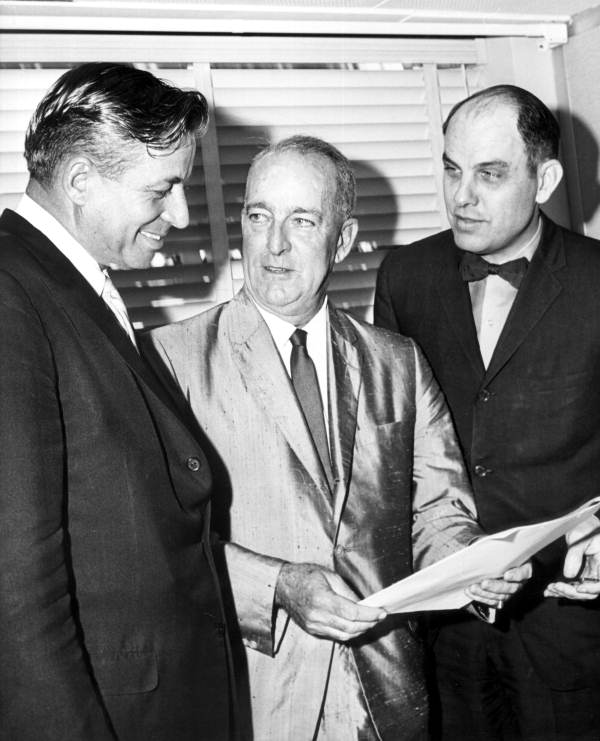
- Roundtree (left) with James H. Sweeny and Ralph Turlington in 1965

Member of the Florida House of Representatives from Brevard County
- In office 1965–1966
- Preceded by: Jim Dressler

Personal details
- Born: July 30, 1921 Alachua County, Florida, U.S.
- Died: January 19, 2000 (aged 78)
- Party: Democratic
- Education: University of Georgia; Northwestern State University; Lon Morris College

William H. Roundtree (July 30, 1921 - January 19, 2000) was an American politician. He served as a Democratic member of the Florida House of Representatives.

== Life and career ==
Roundtree was born in Alachua County, Florida. He attended Melrose Florida High School, Aviation Machinist School, the University of Georgia, Northwestern State University and Lon Morris College. He served in the United States Navy.

In 1965, Roundtree was elected to the Florida House of Representatives, succeeding Jim Dressler, serving until 1966.

Roundtree was a member of the Democratic Executive Committee of Brevard County, Florida.
