= Palmer Collins =

American politician

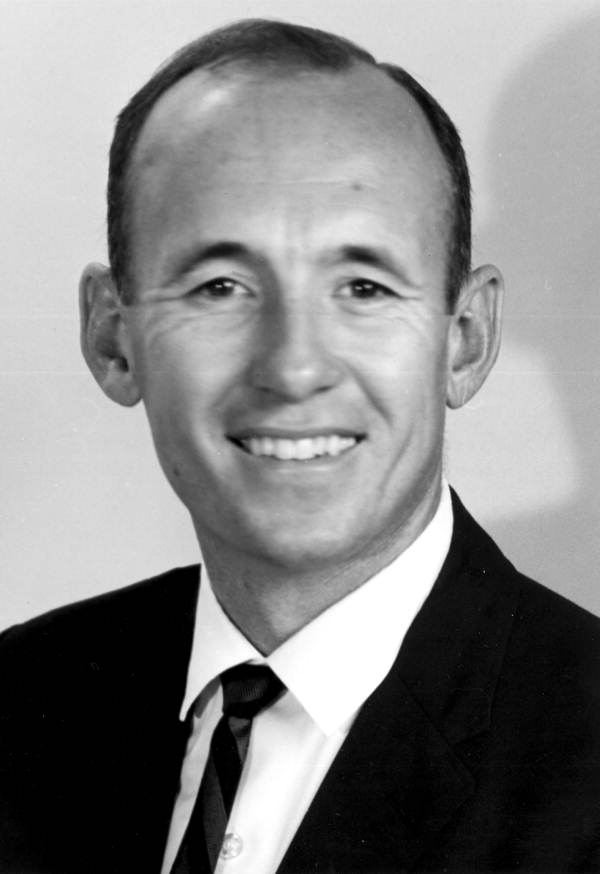
- Collins in 1966

Member of the Florida House of Representatives from Brevard County
- In office 1966–1967

Personal details
- Born: Palmer Warner Collins; June 9, 1930 McMinn County, Tennessee, U.S.
- Died: May 21, 2018 (aged 87)
- Party: Democratic
- Spouse: Marion Collins
- Children: 3
- Education: University of Florida Levin College of Law

Palmer Warner Collins (June 9, 1930 – May 21, 2018) was an American politician. He served as a Democratic member of the Florida House of Representatives.

== Life and career ==
Collins was born in McMinn County, Tennessee. He attended Palm Beach Lakes Community High School, Anderson College and the University of Florida Levin College of Law.

In 1966, Collins was elected to the Florida House of Representatives, serving until 1967.

Collins died in May 2018, at the age of 87.
