= James Russell (Scottish footballer) =

Scottish footballer

Personal information
- Place of birth: Scotland
- Position: Wing half

Senior career*
Years	Team	Apps	(Gls)
1892–1893	Cambuslang		
1893–1894	Grimsby Town	25	(4)
1894–189?	St Bernard's		
- * Club domestic league appearances and goals

James Russell was a Scottish professional footballer who played as a wing half.
