= Bruce Kyle =

American politician (born 1969)

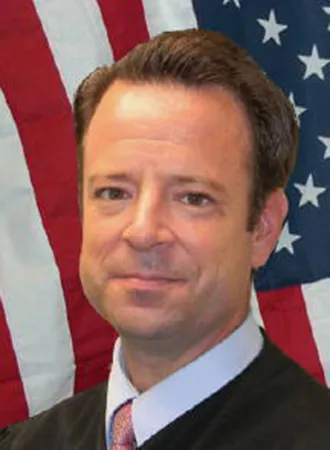

Judge of the Twentieth Judicial Circuit Court of Florida
- Incumbent
- Assumed office January 2, 2007
- Preceded by: Jim Thompson

Member of the Florida House of Representatives from the 73rd district
- In office November 3, 1998 – November 7, 2006
- Preceded by: Keith Arnold
- Succeeded by: Nick Thompson

Personal details
- Born: May 30, 1969 (age 57) Fort Myers, Florida
- Party: Republican
- Spouse: Rebecca Ann Harrington
- Children: Harrison, Reese, Julia
- Education: Emory University (B.A.); St. Thomas University College of Law (J.D.); Villanova University School of Law (LL.M.)
- Occupation: Attorney

Bruce Kyle (born 1969) is an American politician and judge from Florida. He has served as a Judge on the Twentieth Judicial Circuit Court since 2007. Prior to his election as judge, he served as a Republican member of the Florida House of Representatives from 1998 to 2006.

== Early life and career ==
Kyle was born in Fort Myers, Florida. He attended Emory University, receiving his bachelor's degree in 1991, and then attended the St. Thomas University College of Law, receiving his Juris Doctor in 1994. Kyle then attended the Villanova University School of Law, receiving his master of laws in taxation in 1995. He began working as an assistant state attorney in the 20th Judicial Circuit State Attorney's Office, prosecuting juvenile and domestic violence offenses, and later felony drug crimes.

== Florida House of Representatives ==
In 1998, Democratic State Representative Keith Arnold declined to seek re-election, and instead opted to run for Governor. Kyle ran to succeed him, and faced a crowded Republican primary. He placed first in the primary, receiving 34 percent of the vote, and advanced to a runoff election with businessman Jim Fleming, who placed second with 27 percent of the vote. Kyle ultimately defeated Fleming in a landslide, receiving 65 percent of the vote.

Kyle faced Democratic nominee Frank Mann Jr., an attorney and the son of former state legislator Franklin B. Mann, in the general election. Aided in part by Jeb Bush's victory in the gubernatorial election, Kyle defeated Mann, winning 54 percent of the vote to Mann's 46 percent.

In 2000, Kyle ran for re-election and was challenged by attorney Maria Lara Peet, the Chair of the Lee County Democratic Party. Kyle entered the campaign as the frontrunner, significantly outraising Peet, though declining to debate her at a forum hosted by the League of Women Voters, citing a schedule conflict. Kyle ultimately defeated Peet in a landslide, receiving 62 percent of the vote to her 38 percent.

In Kyle's second term, he joined with several other conservative first- and second-term state legislators to form the Freedom Caucus in the state House. The group, which included Kyle, Connie Mack IV, Joe Negron, Carey Baker, Mike Haridopolos, Donald Brown, Jim Kallinger, Jeff Kottkamp, and Chris Hart IV, set out to oppose a tax reform plan by State Senate President John McKay, and launched radio advertisements in opposition to the plan.

Following the reconfiguration of Florida's legislative districts after the 2000 Census, Kyle explored a campaign for the State Senate, but he was drawn into the same district as incumbent Republican State Senator Burt Saunders, and he ultimately decided to seek re-election. Kyle was challenged in the Republican primary by attorney Mike McQuagge, a former University of Florida quarterback. He ultimately defeated McQuagge by a wide margin, receiving 62 percent of the vote to McQuagge's 38 percent. In the general election, Kyle faced Christie Norman, the president of the Democratic Women's Club of Lee County, and Libertarian Kim Hawk. He won re-election in a landslide, winning 63 percent of the vote to Norman's 34 percent and Hawk's 3 percent.

Kyle was re-elected unopposed in 2004 to his fourth and final term in the state House.

== Twentieth Judicial Circuit ==
In 2006, Kyle was term-limited and unable to run for a fifth consecutive term in the state House. Accordingly, he ran for a seat on the Twentieth Judicial Circuit Court, which included Charlotte, Collier, Glades, Hendry, and Lee counties in southwest Florida. He defeated attorney Steve Holmes in the nonpartisan primary election by a wide margin, winning 61 percent of the vote to Holmes's 39 percent.

Kyle was re-elected without opposition in 2012, 2018, and 2024.
