= Jim Russell (ice hockey) =

Canadian ice hockey player

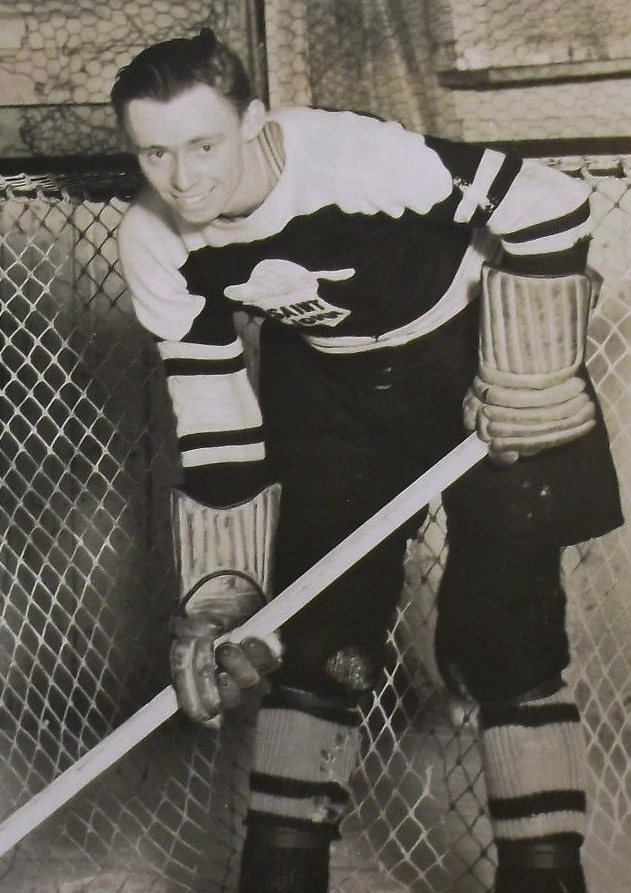
- Russell pictured circa 1938
- Born: March 31, 1918 Hamilton, Ontario, Canada
- Died: September 3, 1977 (aged 59) Hamilton, Ontario, Canada
- Height: 5 ft 10 in (178 cm)
- Weight: 170 lb (77 kg; 12 st 2 lb)
- Position: Right wing
- Shot: Right
- Played for: Sudbury Wolves; Buffalo Bisons; St. Louis Flyers; New Westminster Royals
- National team: Canada
- Playing career: 1936–1951
Medal record
Men's ice hockey
Gold medal – first place	1938 Prague	Ice hockey
Silver medal – second place	1949 Stockholm	Ice hockey

James Russell (March 31, 1918 – September 3, 1977) was a Canadian ice hockey player.

== Early life ==
Russell, a native of Hamilton, Ontario, played junior hockey in Guelph, Ontario. After junior, played hockey in the Maritimes, with the Saint John Beavers, Glace Bay Miners, and North Sydney Victorias. He then served in the Canadian Army during World War II, playing on Army hockey teams in Vancouver and Toronto.

== Career ==
As a member of the Sudbury Wolves, he was a member of the 1938 Team Canada that won a gold medal at the 1938 World Ice Hockey Championships in Prague. Russell also captained the Wolves team that won a silver medal at the 1949 World Ice Hockey Championships in Stockholm, Sweden. He also played professionally with the Buffalo Bisons, St. Louis Flyers of the American Hockey League (in the 1944–45 season) as well as the New Westminster Royals in the Pacific Coast Hockey League (1947–48 season).
