= John Martin Law Jr. =

American politician

John Martin Law Jr. (fl.1943–1947) was mayor of Melbourne, Florida.

He was elected three times, in December 1943, December 1945 and December 1947. He was the son of John Martin Law Sr.
