= Jimmy Russell =

Australian rules footballer

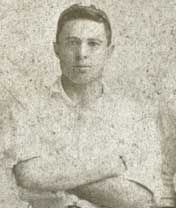

Personal information
- Full name: Arthur Christopher John Russell
- Born: 29 August 1879; Balranald, New South Wales
- Died: 6 August 1925 (aged 45); Heidelberg, Victoria
- Original team: Scotch College
- Height: 174 cm (5 ft 9 in)
- Weight: 72 kg (159 lb)

Playing career^{1}
Years	Club	Games (Goals)
1897–98	Melbourne	5 (4)
- ^{1} Playing statistics correct to the end of 1898.

Arthur Christopher John Russell (29 August 1879 – 6 August 1925) was an Australian rules footballer who played with Melbourne in the Victorian Football League (VFL).
