= Noah B. Butt =

American politician (1886–1956)

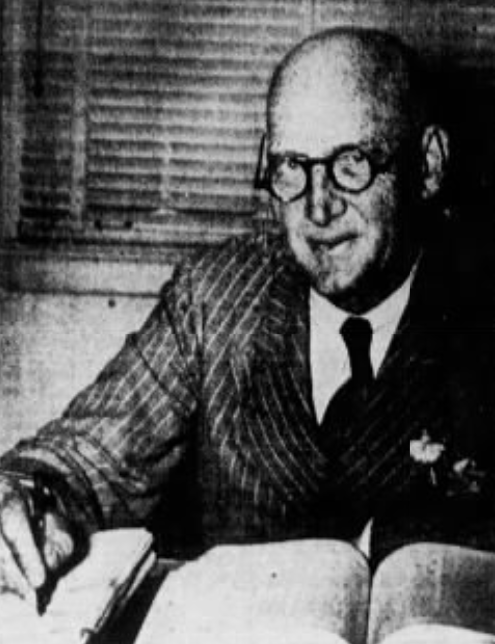
- Butt in 1940

Member of the Florida House of Representatives from Brevard County
- In office 1933–1941

Personal details
- Born: December 13, 1886 Buena Vista, Georgia, U.S.
- Died: September 1956 (aged 69)
- Party: Democratic
- Relatives: William G. Akridge (stepson)

Noah B. Butt (December 13, 1886 – September 1956) was an American politician who served as a Democratic member of the Florida House of Representatives.

== Life and career ==
Butt was born in Buena Vista, Georgia.

Butt served in the Florida House of Representatives from 1933 to 1941.

Butt died in September 1956, at the age of 69.
