= James T. Russell (politician) =

American politician (1927–2006)

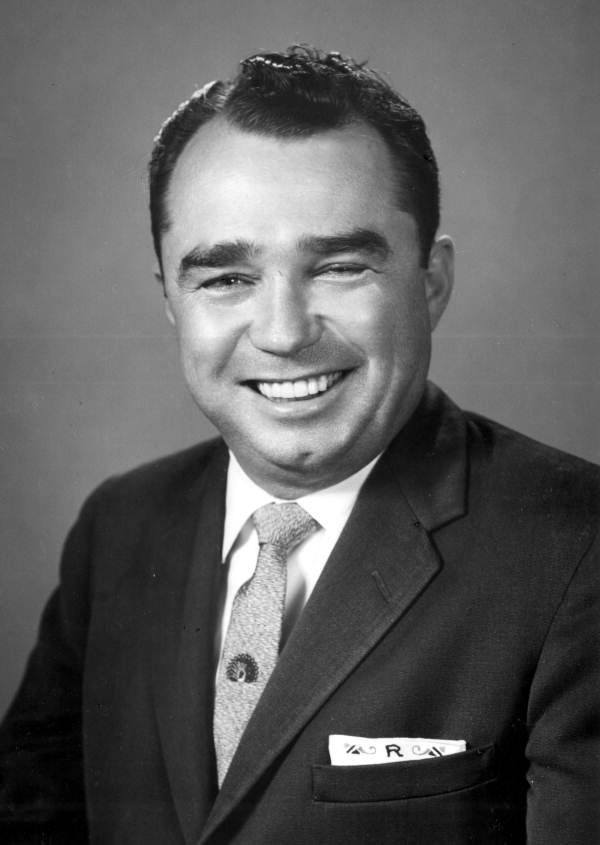
- Russell in 1963

Member of the Florida House of Representatives from Pinellas County
- In office 1959–1965

Personal details
- Born: 1927 St. Petersburg, Florida, U.S.
- Died: January 2, 2006 (aged 78–79) Tennessee, U.S.
- Party: Republican
- Spouse: April Russell
- Children: 4
- Education: St. Petersburg College; Stetson University College of Law

James T. Russell (1927 – January 2, 2006) was an American politician. He served as a Republican member of the Florida House of Representatives.

== Life and career ==
Russell was born in St. Petersburg, Florida, the son of James C. Russell. He attended St. Petersburg High School and served in the United States Navy. He was discharged in 1948, after which he attended St. Petersburg College and Stetson University College of Law.

In 1959, Russell was elected to the Florida House of Representatives, serving until 1965. He was an attorney in Gulfport, Florida.

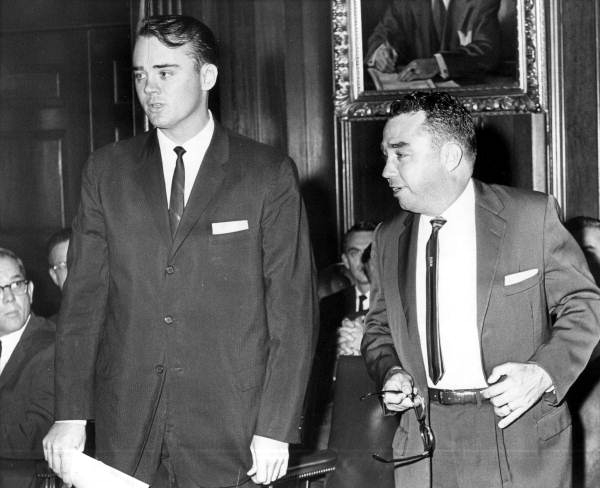
Russell (right) with Bill Young in 1961

Russell died on January 2, 2006, of cancer in Tennessee, at the age of 78.
