= List of rallies for the 2024 Donald Trump presidential campaign =

This is a list of rallies held by Donald Trump for his second successful presidential campaign in the 2024 presidential election resulting in him being elected the 47th president of the United States during his second presidency, which began on January 20, 2025.

== Primary rallies (January 2023 – May 2024) ==
Locations in the United States where President Donald Trump held primary election campaign rallies for his 2024 presidential campaign (according to list below)

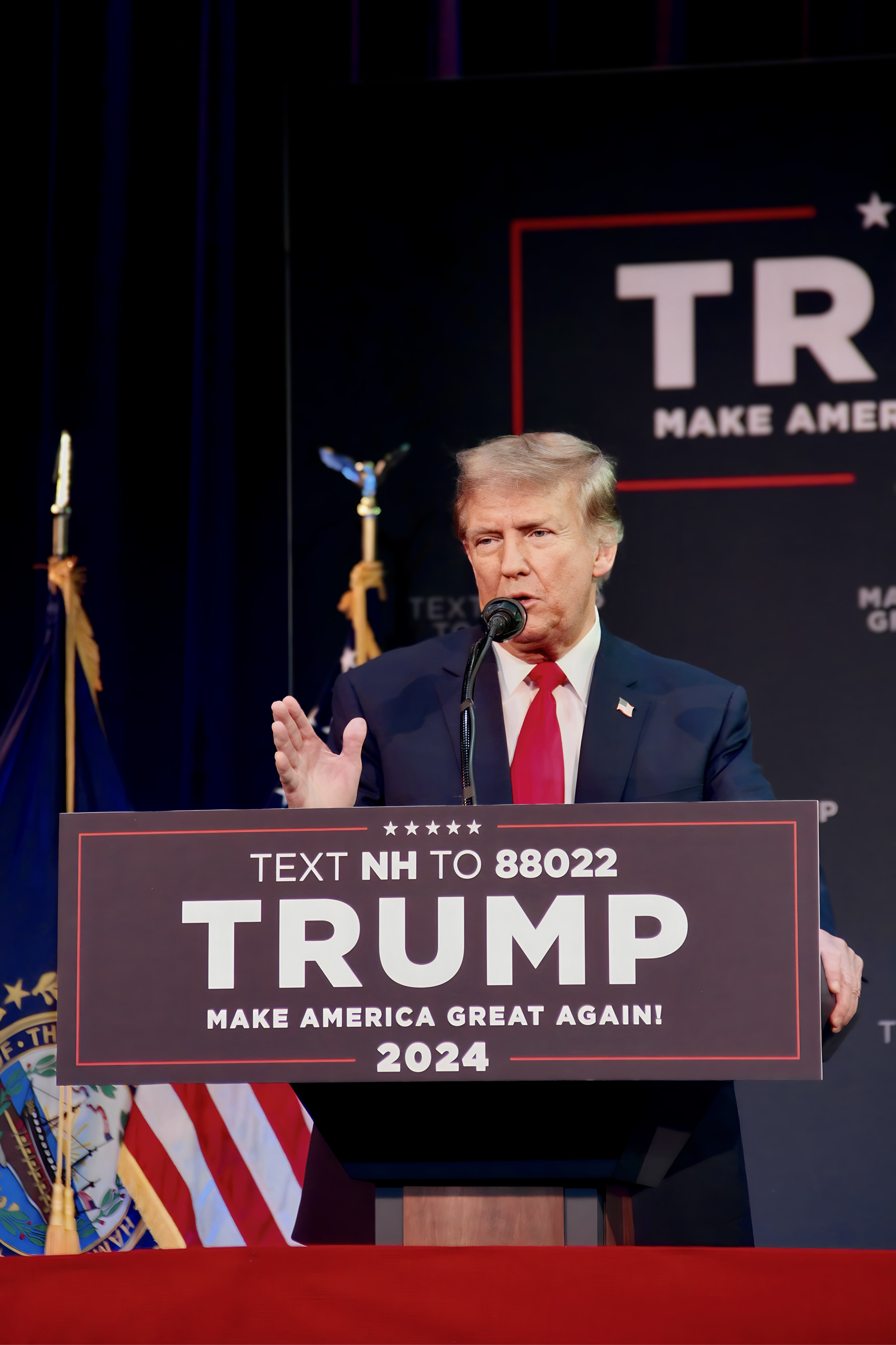
Rochester, New Hampshire. January 22, 2024

Date of rally	City	State	Venue	Other speakers/features	Ref.
Saturday, January 28, 2023	Columbia	SC	The State House	André Bauer, Joe Wilson, Russell Fry, Pamela Evette, Henry McMaster, Lindsey Graham, Will Timmons, Ed McMullen, Peter M. McCoy Jr.	
Saturday, March 25, 2023	Waco	TX	Waco Regional Airport	Dan Patrick, Ken Paxton, Ronny Jackson, Troy Nehls, Wesley Hunt, Michael Burgess, Pete Sessions, John Carter, Randy Weber, Roger Williams, Brian Babin, Pat Fallon, Dawn Buckingham, Sid Miller, Mayra Flores, Ted Nugent (anthem player)	
Thursday, April 27, 2023	Manchester	NH	The Armory at the DoubleTree Manchester Downtown		
Saturday, July 1, 2023	Pickens	SC	Main Street	Lindsey Graham, Russell Fry, Marjorie Taylor Greene	
Friday, July 7, 2023 (Note: Rally originally scheduled for May 13 in Des Moines, but delayed due to the severe weather.)	Council Bluffs	IA	Mid-America Center		
Saturday, July 29, 2023	Erie	PA	Erie Insurance Arena	Sean Parnell, Dan Meuser, Carla Sands, Mike Kelly, Fred Keller	
Tuesday, August 8, 2023	Windham	NH	Windham High School		
Friday, September 8, 2023	Rapid City	SD	The Monument Arena	Kristi Noem	
Wednesday, September 20, 2023	Dubuque, Maquoketa	IA	Grand River Event Center, Jackson County Fairgrounds		
Monday, October 23, 2023	Derry	NH	New England Sports Center		
Saturday October 28, 2023	Las Vegas	NV	Republican Jewish Coalition		
Wednesday, November 8, 2023	Hialeah	FL	Ted Hendricks Stadium at Henry Milander Park	Jorge Masvidal, Maximo Alvarez, Roseanne Barr, Kimberly Guilfoyle, Donald Trump Jr., Sarah Huckabee Sanders, Esteban Bovo	
Saturday, November 11, 2023	Claremont	NH	Stevens High School		
Saturday, December 16, 2023	Durham	NH	Whittemore Center at the University of New Hampshire		
Sunday, December 17, 2023	Reno	NV	Reno-Sparks Convention Center		
Sunday, January 14, 2024	Indianola	IA	Simpson College	Doug Burgum	
Tuesday, January 16, 2024	Atkinson	NH	Atkinson Country Club	Vivek Ramaswamy	
Wednesday, January 17, 2024	Portsmouth	NH	Sheraton Portsmouth Harbor Hotel		
Friday, January 19, 2024	Concord	NH	Capitol Center for the Arts	Tim Scott, Elise Stefanik, Lee Zeldin	
Saturday, January 20, 2024	Manchester	NH	SNHU Arena	Henry McMaster	
Sunday, January 21, 2024	Rochester	NH	Rochester Opera House		
Monday, January 22, 2024	Laconia	NH	The Margate Resort	Doug Burgum, Vivek Ramaswamy, Tim Scott	
Saturday, January 27, 2024	Las Vegas	NV	Big League Dreams Las Vegas		
Saturday, February 10, 2024	Conway	SC	HTC Center at Coastal Carolina University	Henry McMaster, Pamela Evette, Russell Fry	
Wednesday, February 14, 2024	North Charleston	SC	North Charleston Coliseum	Tim Scott	
Saturday, February 17, 2024	Waterford Township	MI	Elite Jet Center at Contact	Lisa McClain	
Friday, February 23, 2024	Rock Hill	SC	Winthrop Coliseum	Henry McMaster	
Saturday, March 2, 2024	Greensboro	NC	Greensboro Coliseum Complex		
Saturday, March 2, 2024	Richmond	VA	Greater Richmond Convention Center		
Saturday, March 9, 2024	Rome	GA	Forum River Center	Marjorie Taylor Greene, David Perdue, Mike Collins, Jim Jordan, Burt Jones, Barry Loudermilk, Doug Collins	
Saturday, March 16, 2024	Dayton	OH	Wright Bros. Aero Inc. at Dayton International Airport	Kristi Noem, Jim Jordan, Bernie Moreno, JD Vance	
Tuesday, April 2, 2024	Green Bay	WI	Hyatt Regency Green Bay	Eric Hovde, Glenn Grothman, Mike Lindell, Tom Tiffany, Ron Johnson	
Saturday, April 13, 2024	Schnecksville	PA	Schnecksville Fire Hall	Stacy Garrity, Dan Meuser	
Wednesday, May 1, 2024	Waukesha	WI	Waukesha County Expo Center	Mike Lindell, Paul Farrow	
Wednesday, May 1, 2024	Freeland	MI	Avflight Saginaw	Mike Rogers, Tudor Dixon, Aric Nesbitt, Matt Hall	
Saturday, May 11, 2024	Wildwood	NJ	Wildwood Beach	Doug Burgum, Jeff Van Drew, Nicole Malliotakis, Chris Smith, Lawrence Taylor, Ottis Anderson	
Thursday, May 23, 2024	New York City	NY	Crotona Park	Andrew Giuliani, Rubén Díaz Sr., Byron Donalds, Sheff G, Sleepy Hallow	

== General election rallies (June 2024 – November 2024) ==
Locations in the United States where President Donald Trump held general election campaign rallies for his 2024 presidential campaign (According to list below).

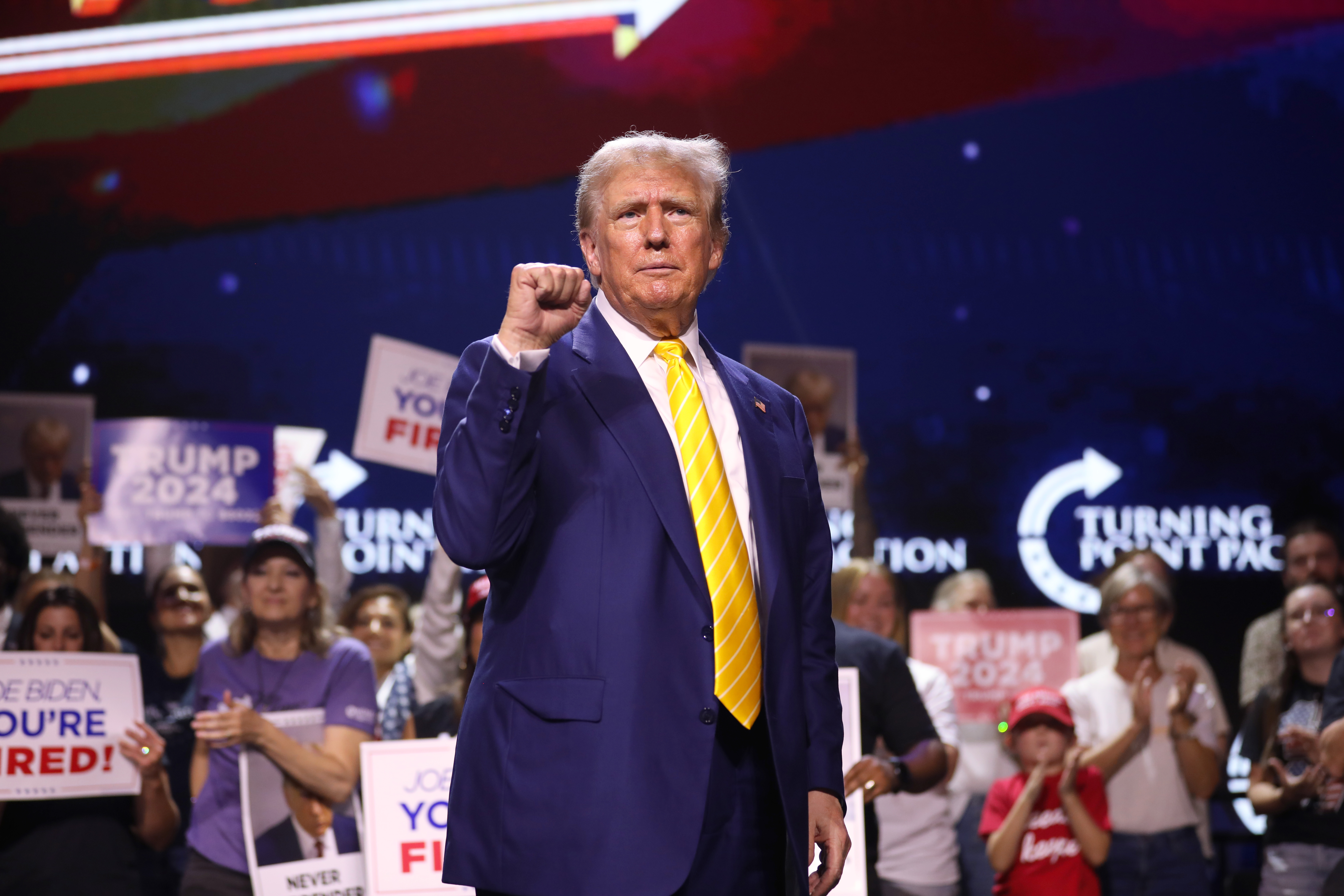
Phoenix, Arizona. June 6, 2024

Date of rally	City	State	Venue	Other speakers/features	Ref.
Thursday, June 6, 2024	Phoenix	AZ	Dream City Church	Charlie Kirk	
Sunday, June 9, 2024	Paradise	NV	Sunset Park	Marjorie Taylor Greene	
Saturday, June 15, 2024	Detroit	MI	180 Church	Ben Carson, Byron Donalds, John James, Sada Baby	
Tuesday, June 18, 2024	Racine	WI	Racine Festival Park	Vivek Ramaswamy, Eric Hovde, Scott Walker, Tommy Thompson, Bryan Steil, Derrick Van Orden	
Saturday, June 22, 2024	Philadelphia	PA	Liacouras Center	David McCormick, Dan Meuser	
Friday, June 28, 2024	Chesapeake	VA	Historic Greenbrier Farms	Glenn Youngkin, George Allen, Bob McDonnell, Jen Kiggans, Jason Miyares, Hung Cao	
Tuesday, July 9, 2024	Doral	FL	Trump National Doral Miami	Donald Trump Jr., Eric Trump, Alina Habba, Mike Lindell, Marco Rubio, Rick Scott, Byron Donalds, Carlos A. Giménez, María Elvira Salazar, Mario Díaz-Balart, David Borrero	
Saturday, July 13, 2024	Meridian	PA	Butler Farm Show Inc.	David McCormick, Dan Meuser, Mike Kelly, Sean Parnell: Rally ended early after the attempted assassination of Trump.	
Saturday, July 20, 2024	Grand Rapids	MI	Van Andel Arena	JD Vance, Pete Hoekstra, Tim Walberg, Tom Barrett, Jack Bergman, Bill Huizenga, Brian Mast, Mike Rogers	
Wednesday, July 24, 2024	Charlotte	NC	Bojangles Coliseum	Mark Harris, Brandon Judd, Tim Moore, Richard Hudson, Dan Bishop, Michael Whatley	
Saturday, July 27, 2024	St. Cloud	MN	Herb Brooks National Hockey Center	JD Vance, Mike Lindell, Tom Emmer, Lisa Demuth, Donna Bergstrom, Bernie Perryman	
Wednesday, July 31, 2024	Harrisburg	PA	Pennsylvania Farm Show Complex & Expo Center (in the, New Holland Arena)	David McCormick, Dan Meuser, Lloyd Smucker, Glenn Thompson, Scott Perry, Alina Habba	
Saturday, August 3, 2024	Atlanta	GA	Georgia State Convocation Center	JD Vance, Jentezen Franklin, Tyler Harper, David Perdue, Brian Jack, Mike Collins, Marjorie Taylor Greene, Burt Jones	
Friday, August 9, 2024	Bozeman	MT	Brick Breeden Fieldhouse	Greg Gianforte, Tim Sheehy, Steve Daines, Matthew Whitaker, Austin Knudsen, Ryan Zinke, Troy Downing, Christi Jacobsen	
Wednesday, August 14, 2024	Asheville	NC	Harrah's Cherokee Center	Mark Robinson, Ted Budd, Chuck Edwards	
Saturday, August 17, 2024	Wilkes-Barre	PA	Mohegan Sun Arena at Casey Plaza	David McCormick, Rick Santorum, Stacy Garrity, Michael Whatley, Dan Meuser	
Wednesday, August 21, 2024	Asheboro	NC	North Carolina Aviation Museum & Hall of Fame	JD Vance, Richard Hudson, Keith Kellogg	
Friday, August 23, 2024	Glendale	AZ	Desert Diamond Arena	Mark Lamb, Riley Gaines, Bob Unanue, Jerry Weiers, Jake Hoffman, Eli Crane, Paul Gosar, Shelli Boggs, Jerry Sheridan, Andy Biggs, Justin Heap, Abraham Hamadeh, Charlie Kirk, Kari Lake, Robert F. Kennedy Jr.	
Thursday, August 29, 2024	La Crosse	WI	La Crosse Center	Tulsi Gabbard: Town-hall style rally	
Friday, August 30, 2024	Johnstown	PA	1st Summit Arena at Cambria County War Memorial	David McCormick, Carla Sands, Sean Parnell, Dan Meuser, John Joyce, Stephen Miller, Alina Habba, Byron Donalds, Anuel AA, Justin Quiles	
Saturday, September 7, 2024	Mosinee	WI	Central Wisconsin Airport	Brian Schimming, Tom Tiffany, Ron Johnson, Eric Hovde, Gretchen Wilson	
Thursday, September 12, 2024	Tucson	AZ	Linda Ronstadt Music Hall	Kari Lake, Gina Swoboda	
Friday, September 13, 2024	Las Vegas	NV	The Expo World Market Center	Wayne Allyn Root, Rick Harrison, Henry Cejudo, Kash Patel, Sam Brown, Michael McDonald, Tulsi Gabbard, Kyle Forgeard, Salim Sirur, Bryce Hall	
Tuesday, September 17, 2024	Flint	MI	Dort Financial Center	Sarah Huckabee Sanders: Town-hall style rally	
Wednesday, September 18, 2024	Uniondale	NY	Nassau Veterans Memorial Coliseum	Lee Zeldin, Rudy Giuliani, Edward F. Cox, Scott LoBaido, Nicole Malliotakis, Anthony D'Esposito, Nick LaLota, Mike LiPetri, Bruce Blakeman	
Saturday, September 21, 2024 (Note: Rally originally scheduled for April 20, but delayed due to the severe weather.)	Wilmington	NC	Aero Center Wilmington	Ted Budd, Michael Whatley, Dan Bishop, David Rouzer, Anna Paulina Luna, Luke Farley	
Monday, September 23, 2024	Indiana	PA	Kovalchik Convention and Athletic Complex, Ed Fry Arena	David McCormick, Sean Parnell, Glenn Thompson, Lee Zeldin	
Tuesday, September 24, 2024	Savannah	GA	Johnny Mercer Theatre Civic Center	Burt Jones, David Perdue, Marjorie Taylor Greene, Buddy Carter	
Wednesday, September 25, 2024	Mint Hill	NC	Mosack Group	Mark Harris, Pat Harrigan	
Friday, September 27, 2024	Walker	MI	FALK Production	Robert F. Kennedy Jr., Mike Rogers	
Friday, September 27, 2024	Warren	MI	Macomb Community College	Marsha Blackburn: Town-hall style rally	
Saturday, September 28, 2024	Prairie du Chien	WI	800 E Crawford St	Derrick Van Orden, Travis Tranel	
Sunday, September 29, 2024	Erie	PA	Bayfront Convention Center	Nick Langworthy, Jake Banta	
Tuesday, October 1, 2024	Waunakee	WI	Dane Manufacturing	Scott Walker, Tommy Thompson	
Tuesday, October 1, 2024	Milwaukee	WI	Discovery World	Bryan Steil	
Thursday, October 3, 2024	Saginaw	MI	Ryder Center	Mike Rogers, Pete Hoekstra, Jack Bergman, Paul Junge	
Friday, October 4, 2024	Fayetteville	NC	Crown Complex	Robert Wilkie, Anna Paulina Luna, Silk (of Diamond and Silk): Town-hall style rally	
Saturday, October 5, 2024	Meridian	PA	Butler Farm Show Inc.	JD Vance, Eric Trump, Lara Trump, Elon Musk, David McCormick, Sean Parnell, Scott LoBaido, Steve Witkoff, Scott Presler, Lee Greenwood	
Sunday, October 6, 2024	Juneau	WI	Dodge County Airport	Eric Hovde, Ron Johnson, Scott Fitzgerald, Troy Nehls, Brian Schimming	
Wednesday, October 9, 2024	Scranton	PA	Riverfront Sports	David McCormick, Vivek Ramaswamy	
Wednesday, October 9, 2024	Reading	PA	Santander Arena	David McCormick, Vivek Ramaswamy, Stephen Miller, Alina Habba, Jeff Bartos, Dan Meuser, Lloyd Smucker, John Joyce, Kat Cammack	
Friday, October 11, 2024	Aurora	CO	Gaylord Rockies Resort & Convention Center	Dave Williams, Derek Wolfe, Lauren Boebert, Harriet Hageman, Gabe Evans, Jeff Crank, Greg Lopez, Stephen Miller	
Friday, October 11, 2024	Reno	NV	Grand Sierra Resort	Sam Brown, Michael McDonald, Mark Amodei, Burgess Owens	
Saturday, October 12, 2024	Coachella	CA	Calhoun Ranch (farm)	Jessica Millan Patterson, Chad Bianco, Leah Cecil, Gloria Romero, Robert C. O'Brien, Richard Grenell, Kash Patel, Dennis Quaid, Matt Gaetz, Ken Calvert, Wesley Hunt, Stephen Miller	
Sunday, October 13, 2024	Prescott Valley	AZ	Findlay Toyota Center	David Sparks, David Kiley, Gina Swoboda, Kash Patel, Mike Lee, Celeste Maloy, Eli Crane, Kari Lake, Glenn Beck, Brandon Judd, Art Del Cueto, Paul Perez, Mark Green, Stephen Miller	
Monday, October 14, 2024	Oaks	PA	The Greater Philadelphia Expo Center & Fairgrounds	Peter Deutsch, Kristi Noem: Town-hall style rally	
Tuesday, October 15, 2024	Atlanta	GA	Cobb Energy Performing Arts Centre	Burt Jones, Marjorie Taylor Greene, Byron Donalds, Kelly Loeffler, Brian Jack, Mike Collins, Doug Collins, John F. King, Alveda King, Brandon Beach	
Friday, October 18, 2024	Detroit	MI	Huntington Place	Mike Rogers, Byron Donalds, Stephen Miller, Thomas Hearns, Trick Trick	
Saturday, October 19, 2024	Latrobe	PA	Arnold Palmer Regional Airport	Antonio Brown, Le'Veon Bell, John Joyce, Dan Meuser, Tom Cotton, David McCormick	
Sunday, October 20, 2024	Lancaster	PA	Lancaster Convention Center	Sage Steele, Lloyd Smucker, Dan Meuser: Town-hall style rally	
Monday, October 21, 2024	Greenville	NC	Williams Arena	Dan Bishop, Ted Budd, Peter Navarro, Hogan Gidley, Laurie Buckhout, Stephen Miller	
Monday, October 21, 2024	Concord	NC	Concord Convention Center	Eric Trump, Ben Carson, Peter Navarro, Franklin Graham, Mark Harris, Paula White, Guillermo Maldonado, Neal Jackson, Scott Turner, Lee Greenwood	
Tuesday, October 22, 2024	Greensboro	NC	Greensboro Coliseum	Tulsi Gabbard, Ted Budd, Peter Navarro, Virginia Foxx, Addison McDowell	
Wednesday, October 23, 2024	Zebulon	GA	Christ Chapel	Burt Jones, Brian Jack, Ralph Reed	
Wednesday, October 23, 2024	Duluth	GA	Gas South Arena	Charlie Kirk, Tucker Carlson, Robert F. Kennedy Jr., Tulsi Gabbard, Jason Aldean, Ben Carson, Riley Gaines, Marjorie Taylor Greene, Peter Navarro, Benny Johnson, Mike Collins, Jentezen Franklin, Seth Dillon, Del Bigtree, Tyler Harper, Jenny Beth Martin	
Thursday, October 24, 2024	Tempe	AZ	Mullett Arena	Vivek Ramaswamy, Marco Rubio, Kari Lake, Gina Swoboda, Andy Biggs, Eli Crane, Stephen Miller	
Thursday, October 24, 2024	Paradise	NV	Thomas & Mack Center	Charlie Kirk, Tulsi Gabbard, Vivek Ramaswamy, Marco Rubio, Common Kings, Sam Brown, Michael McDonald, Jorge Masvidal, Gina Carano, Jack Posobiec, Danica Patrick, Kash Patel, Bob Unanue, Del Bigtree, Sigal Chattah, Setema Gali	
Friday, October 25, 2024	Traverse City	MI	Avflight at Cherry Capital Airport	Doug Burgum, Jack Bergman, Pete Hoekstra, Tudor Dixon	
Saturday, October 26, 2024	Novi	MI	Suburban Collection Showplace	Tom Barrett, Mike Rogers, John James, Lisa McClain, Darrell Issa, Stephen Miller, Dan Scavino	
Saturday, October 26, 2024	State College	PA	Bryce Jordan Center	John Joyce, Glenn Thompson, Stephen Miller	
Sunday, October 27, 2024	New York City	NY	Madison Square Garden	Tiffany Justice, Mary Millben, Tony Hinchcliffe, Scott LoBaido, Sid Rosenberg, Alina Habba, Grant Cardone, Brooke Rollins, Rudy Giuliani, Michael Harris Jr., Sergio Gor, David Rem, Dan Scavino, Stephen Miller, Steve Witkoff, Byron Donalds, Elise Stefanik, Mike Johnson, Vivek Ramaswamy, Tulsi Gabbard, Robert F. Kennedy Jr., Tucker Carlson, Hulk Hogan, Phil McGraw, JD Vance, Eric Trump, Lara Trump, Donald Trump Jr., Dana White, Howard Lutnick, Elon Musk, Melania Trump, Lee Greenwood, Christopher Macchio	
Monday, October 28, 2024	Atlanta	GA	McCamish Pavilion	Marjorie Taylor Greene, Kelly Loeffler, Rich McCormick, Mike Collins, James Burchett, Greg Dolezal, Alina Habba, Karoline Leavitt, Stephen Miller	
Tuesday, October 29, 2024	Allentown	PA	PPL Center	Marco Rubio, Zoraida Buxó, Michael Whatley, Dan Meuser, Wesley Hunt, Ryan Mackenzie, Jarrett Coleman, Alina Habba	
Wednesday, October 30, 2024	Rocky Mount	NC	Rocky Mount Event Center	Byron Donalds, Tom Emmer, Keith Kellogg, Richard Hudson, Laurie Buckhout	
Wednesday, October 30, 2024	Green Bay	WI	Resch Center	Brett Favre, Eric Hovde, Ron Johnson, Tony Wied, Byron Donalds, Tom Emmer	
Thursday, October 31, 2024	Albuquerque	NM	CSI Aviation	Nella Domenici, Yvette Herrell, Myron Lizer, Steve Pearce, Markwayne Mullin	
Thursday, October 31, 2024	Henderson	NV	Lee's Family Forum	Sam Brown, Joe Lombardo, Stavros Anthony, Markwayne Mullin, Michael McDonald, Matt Gaetz	
Thursday, October 31, 2024	Glendale	AZ	Desert Diamond Arena	Robert F. Kennedy Jr., Nicole Shanahan, Tucker Carlson, Charlie Kirk, Mike Lee	
Friday, November 1, 2024	Warren	MI	Macomb Community College	Robert F. Kennedy Jr., Mike Rogers, Markwayne Mullin, Eric Schmitt, Pete Hoekstra	
Friday, November 1, 2024	Milwaukee	WI	Fiserv Forum	Robert F. Kennedy Jr., Eric Hovde, Ron Johnson, Scott Walker, Tommy Thompson, Markwayne Mullin, Eric Schmitt, Bryan Steil, Scott Fitzgerald, Sebastian Gorka, Brian Schimming	
Saturday, November 2, 2024	Gastonia	NC	Gastonia Municipal Airport	Tim Moore, Pat Harrigan, Dan Bishop, Michael Whatley, Pam Bondi	
Saturday, November 2, 2024	Salem	VA	Salem Civic Center	Hung Cao, Glenn Youngkin, Winsome Sears, Jason Miyares, Ben Cline, Morgan Griffith, John McGuire, Michael Whatley, Stephen Miller, The Isaacs	
Saturday, November 2, 2024	Greensboro	NC	First Horizon Coliseum	Ted Budd, Michael Whatley, Pam Bondi	
Sunday, November 3, 2024	Lititz	PA	Flyadvanced Lancaster	David McCormick, Dan Meuser, John Joyce, Lloyd Smucker, Scott Perry, Danica Patrick, Sage Steele, Tulsi Gabbard, Sarah Huckabee Sanders, Stephen Miller	
Sunday, November 3, 2024	Kinston	NC	Kinston Jet Center	Dan Bishop, Steve Scalise, Greg Murphy, Laurie Buckhout, Alina Habba	
Sunday, November 3, 2024	Macon	GA	Atrium Health Amphitheater	Burt Jones, Marco Rubio, Herschel Walker, Sarah Huckabee Sanders, Marjorie Taylor Greene, David Perdue, Kelly Loeffler, Steve Scalise, Brian Jack, Mike Collins, Doug Collins, Andrew Clyde, Austin Scott, Tyler Harper, Brooke Huckaby, John F. Kennedy, Joshua McKoon, Stephen Miller, Steve Witkoff	
Monday, November 4, 2024	Raleigh	NC	J.S. Dorton Arena	Donald Trump Jr., Dan Bishop, Ted Budd, Alice Marie Johnson, Brad Knott, Alan Swain, Alina Habba	
Monday, November 4, 2024	Reading	PA	Santander Arena	David McCormick, Mike Pompeo, Tom Cotton, Bill Hagerty, Marco Rubio, Glenn Thompson, Donald Trump Jr., Eric Trump, Lara Trump, Tiffany Trump, Elizabeth Pipko, Sarah Huckabee Sanders	
Monday, November 4, 2024	Pittsburgh	PA	PPG Paints Arena	David McCormick, Mike Pompeo, Glenn Thompson, Sarah Huckabee Sanders, Tulsi Gabbard, John Joyce, Sean Parnell, Megyn Kelly	
Monday, November 4, 2024	Grand Rapids	MI	Van Andel Arena	Mike Rogers, Pete Hoekstra, Tim Walberg, Tom Barrett, Amer Ghalib, John Moolenaar, Bill Huizenga, Richard Grenell, Doug Burgum, Lara Trump, Donald Trump Jr., Eric Trump, Tiffany Trump	

== See also ==
- List of rallies for the 2016 Donald Trump presidential campaign, rallies for Trump's first successful campaign
- List of Donald Trump rallies (December 2016–2022), including rallies for Trump's unsuccessful re-election campaign
- List of Donald Trump rallies (2025–present)
