= Lists of Trump rallies =

The list of Trump rallies has been spread across four articles:

- List of rallies for the 2016 Donald Trump presidential campaign
- List of Donald Trump rallies (December 2016–2022)
- List of rallies for the 2024 Donald Trump presidential campaign
- List of Donald Trump rallies (2025–present)
