= List of Donald Trump rallies (2025–present) =

This is a list of rallies held by Donald Trump, who is currently serving as the 47th president of the United States since January 20, 2025 after his victory in 2024 presidential election, and for the 2026 midterms in support of various politicians.

== Inauguration rally ==
Washington, D.C., 01/20/2025

On January 19, 2025, Donald Trump held a Make America Great Again victory rally at the Capital One Arena in Washington, D.C.. The following day, Trump also hosted the Inaugural Parade at the same location due to the freezing temperatures.

Date of rally	City	State	Venue	Other speakers/features	Ref.
Sunday, January 19, 2025	Washington	DC	Capital One Arena	Angela Halili, Arielle Reitsma, Elon Musk, Kid Rock, Anuel AA, Justin Quiles, Jon Voight, Stephen Miller, Megyn Kelly, Steve Witkoff, Dana White, Eric Trump, Luke Trump, Carolina Dorothy Trump, Lara Trump, Donald Trump Jr., Kai Trump, Lee Greenwood, Village People	

== Post–2025 inauguration rallies ==
West Mifflin, Pennsylvania, 05/30/2025

Date of rally	City	State	Venue	Other speakers/features	Ref.
Saturday, January 25, 2025	Las Vegas	NV	Circa Resort & Casino	Rick Harrison	
Tuesday, April 29, 2025	Warren	MI	Macomb Community College	Brian Pannebecker, Pete Hegseth, Dr. Oz, John James, Matt Hall, Aric Nesbitt, Jim Runestad, Michael Whatley, Stephen Miller, Justin Caporale, Margo Martin, Scott Jennings	
Friday, May 30, 2025	West Mifflin	PA	Mon Valley Works–Irvin Plant	David Burritt, Takahiro Mori, Scott Bessent, Lori Chavez-DeRemer, Dan Meuser, Mike Kelly, Guy Reschenthaler, Michael Rulli, Pete Stauber, Kim Ward	
Thursday, July 3, 2025	Des Moines	IA	Iowa State Fairgrounds	Kristi Noem, Brooke Rollins, Monica Crowley, Lee Greenwood, Danny Gokey, Jeff Kaufmann, Joni Ernst, Chuck Grassley, Brenna Bird	
Tuesday, December 9, 2025	Mount Pocono	PA	Mount Airy Casino Resort	Rob Bresnahan, Dan Meuser, Ryan Mackenzie, Chris Wright, Scott Bessent	
Friday, December 19, 2025	Rocky Mount	NC	Rocky Mount Event Center	Phil Berger, Michael Whatley, Lori Chavez-DeRemer, Brad Knott, Tim Moore	

== 2026 midterm rallies ==
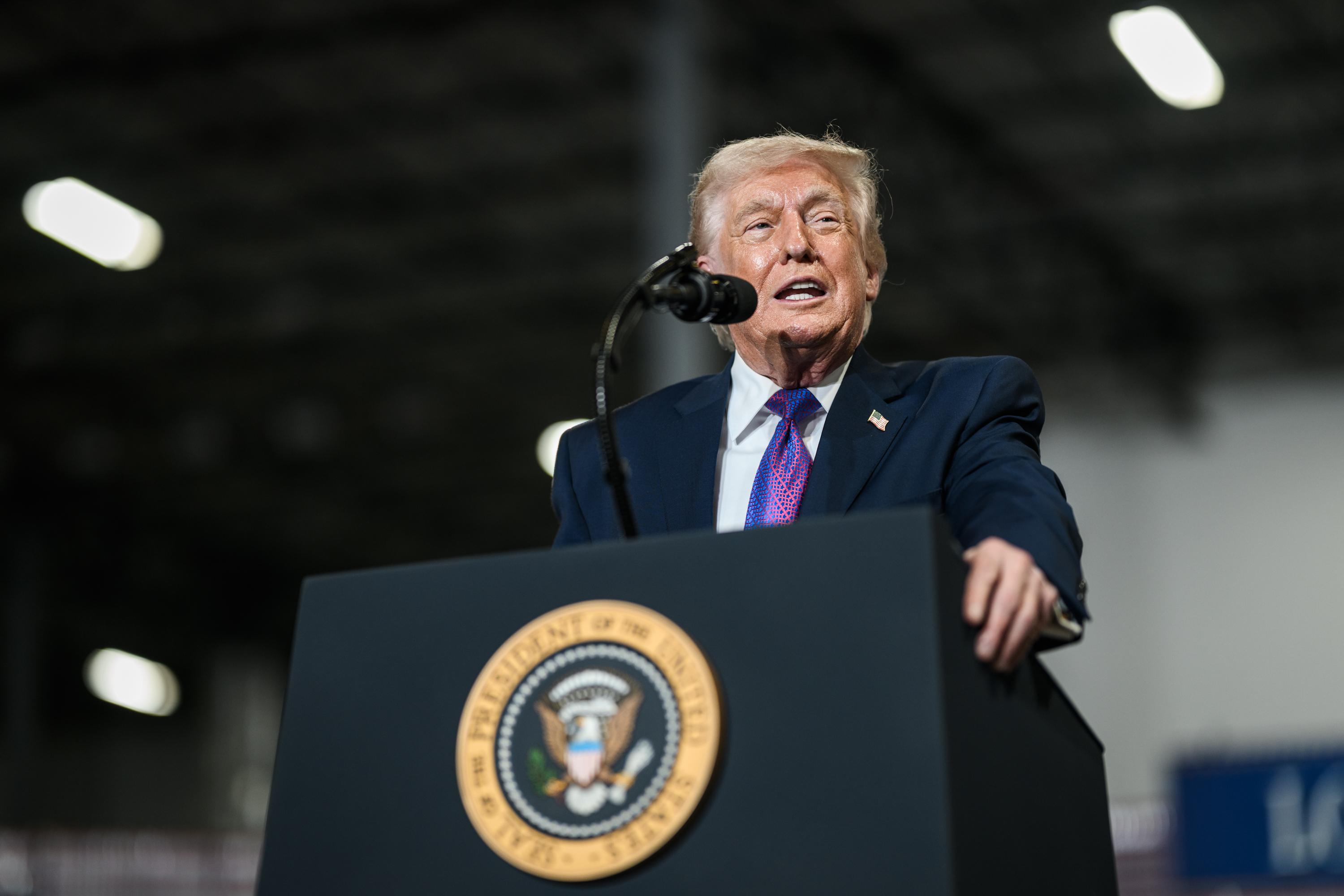
Hebron, Kentucky, 03/11/2026

Date of rally	City	State	Venue	Other speakers/features	Ref.
Tuesday, January 27, 2026	Clive	IA	Horizon Events Center	Ashley Hinson, Zach Nunn, Mariannette Miller-Meeks, Brad Zaun, Jeff Kaufmann, Brooke Boden	
Thursday, February 19, 2026	Rome	GA	Coosa Steel Corporation	Gunner Stockton, Herschel Walker, Burt Jones, Clay Fuller, Buddy Carter, Barry Loudermilk, Brandon Beach, Steve Gooch, Katie Dempsey	
Friday, February 27, 2026	Corpus Christi	TX	Port of Corpus Christi	Dennis Quaid, Ted Cruz, John Cornyn, Ken Paxton, Greg Abbott, Dan Patrick, Chris Wright, Wesley Hunt, Michael Cloud, Lance Gooden, Tony Gonzales, Eric Flores, Carlos De La Cruz, Tano Tijerina	
Wednesday, March 11, 2026	Hebron	KY	Verst Logistics Manufacturing	Jake Paul, Nick Sandmann, Andy Barr, Ed Gallrein, Daniel Cameron, Nate Morris, Russell Coleman, Allison Ball, Michael Adams, Mark Metcalf, Mehmet Oz	
Friday, April 17, 2026	Phoenix	AZ	Dream City Church	Erika Kirk, Andy Biggs, Eli Crane, Abraham Hamadeh, Paul Gosar, Juan Ciscomani, Tommy Barnett, Danica Patrick, Jeremy Roenick, Jay Feely, Mark Lamb, Kathryn Limbaugh	
Friday, May 1, 2026	The Villages	FL	The Villages Charter High School	Byron Donalds, Ashley Moody, Wilton Simpson, Phil McGraw	
Friday, May 22, 2026	Suffern	NY	Rockland Community College	Mike Lawler, Jaxson Dart, Bruce Blakeman, Howard Lutnick	
Friday, June 5, 2026	Chippewa Falls	WI	Custer Farms	Brooke Rollins, Ron Johnson, Tom Tiffany, Derrick Van Orden, Jordan Stolz	
Tuesday, June 23, 2026	Macungie	PA	Mack Trucks Lehigh Valley Operations	Dan Meuser, Ryan Mackenzie, Stacy Garrity, Jared Isaacman, Bo Nickal, Anthony Cassar	
Wednesday, June 24, 2026	Washington	DC	National Mall	Lee Greenwood, Christopher Macchio, Alexis Wilkins, United States Marine Band, Monica Crowley, Doug Burgum, Brooke Rollins, Jentezen Franklin, Frank Siller, Sean Duffy, Jocko Willink	
Saturday, July 4, 2026	Washington	DC	National Mall	Christopher Macchio, Lee Greenwood, United States Marine Band, Paris Davis	
Wednesday, July 22, 2026	Marietta	GA	Wheeler High School	Brian Strickland, Tim Fleming, Greg Dolezal, Rick Jackson, Brandon Beach, Linda McMahon, Kelly Loeffler, Scott Bessent, Brian Snitker	
Monday, July 27, 2026	Milford	MI	General Motors Proving Ground	John James, Mike Rogers, Mary Barra, Lisa McClain, Tom Barrett, Amir Hassan	
Wednesday, August 5, 2026	Las Vegas	NV	Red Rock Casino, Resort & Spa	Joe Lombardo, Dana White, Mike Tyson, Carrie Buck, Martin O'Donnell	
Friday, August 14, 2026	Garden City	NY	David S. Mack Center for Training and Intelligence	Todd Blanche, Kash Patel, Bruce Blakeman	
Friday, August 21, 2026	Myrtle Beach	SC	Myrtle Beach Convention Center	Darline Graham, Tim Scott, John Barrasso, Russell Fry, Jenny Honeycutt, Cody Simpson	
Wednesday, September 16, 2026	Gastonia	NC	Gastonia Municipal Airport	Michael Whatley, Neal Jackson, Brad Overcash, Todd Blanche	
Thursday, October 1, 2026	Denton	TX	Peterbilt Motors Company	Ted Cruz, Ken Paxton, Dennis Rodman, Preston Feight	
Thursday, October 1, 2026	Durant	OK	Choctaw Event Center	Mike Mazzei, Brandon Beach, Cindy Byrd, Mark Tedford, T. W. Shannon, Josh Brecheen, Kevin Hern, Harold Hamm, Markwayne Mullin	
Friday, October 2, 2026	Mobile	AL	Mitchell Center	Tommy Tuberville, John Wahl, Barry Moore, Jerry Carl, Katie Britt, Chris Pringle, Rhett Marques, Katherine Robertson, Caroleene Dobson, Corey Hill, Paul Burch	
Saturday, October 3, 2026	Vandalia	OH	Butler High School	Jon Husted, Vivek Ramaswamy, Bernie Moreno, Keith Faber, Frank LaRose, Alex Triantafilou, Derek Merrin, Mike Turner, Jon Gruden	
Monday, October 5, 2026	Grand Island	NE	Pinnacle Bank Expo Center	Pete Ricketts, Jim Pillen, Adrian Smith, Mike Hilgers, Tanya Storer, Bob Andersen, Angela Eberspacher	
Wednesday, October 7, 2026	San Antonio	TX	Freeman Coliseum	Ken Paxton, Carlos De La Cruz, Roger Clemens, Dan Patrick, Mayes Middleton, Brandon Herrera, Chris Gober, Robert Unanue, Paul Perez	
Friday, October 9, 2026	Syracuse	NY	Nicholas J. Pirro Convention Center	Bruce Blakeman, Mike Tyson, Todd Hood, Robert J. O'Neill, Kailee Buller, Anthony Constantino, John Garcia	
Saturday, October 10, 2026	Clarksville	TN	F&M Bank Arena	Marsha Blackburn, Bill Hagerty, Matt Van Epps, Tim Burchett, Scott DesJarlais, Johnny Garrett, Brent Taylor, Charlie Hatcher, Cameron Sexton, Glenn Jacobs, Kid Rock, Wes Golden	
Monday, October 12, 2026	Youngstown	OH	Covelli Centre	Jon Husted, Vivek Ramaswamy, Bernie Moreno, Michael Rulli, Jay Edwards, Robert Sprague, Alex Triantafilou, Jon Gruden, Jake Paul	
Tuesday, October 13, 2026	Wasilla	AK	Curtis D. Menard Memorial Sports Center	Dan Sullivan, Mike Dunleavy, Nick Begich III, Carmela Warfield, Shauna Hegna, Victor Fonov	
Wednesday, October 14, 2026	Bullhead City	AZ	Laughlin/Bullhead International Airport	Andy Biggs, Sine Kerr, Paul Gosar, Abraham Hamadeh, Mark Lamb, Martin O'Donnell, Alexander Kolodin, Joe Gruters, Sergio Arellano, David Rose	
Wednesday, October 14, 2026	Kalispell	MT	Majestic Valley Arena	Aaron Flint, Troy Downing, Greg Gianforte, Kurt Alme, Ryan Zinke	
Friday, October 16, 2026	Dalton	GA	Dalton Municipal Airport	Mike Collins, Rick Jackson, Clay Fuller, Greg Dolezal, Tim Fleming, Brian Strickland, John F. King, Brandon Beach, Paul Perez	
Saturday, October 17, 2026	Highland Heights	KY	Truist Arena	Andy Barr, Ed Gallrein, Eric Conroy, Mark Metcalf, Robert Benvenuti	
Monday, October 19, 2026	Park City	KS	Heartland Credit Union Arena	Roger Marshall, Ty Masterson, Ted Nugent, Ron Estes, Tracey Mann, Derek Schmidt, Kris Kobach, Pat Proctor, Steven Johnson	
Tuesday, October 20, 2026	Greenville	NC	Pitt-Greenville Airport	Michael Whatley, Laurie Buckhout, Tim Scott, Ted Budd, Jennifer Balkcom, Craig Collins, Paul Perez, Jason Simmons	
Wednesday, October 21, 2026	Pendleton	SC	T. Ed Garrison Arena	Darline Graham, Tim Scott, Russell Fry, Sheri Biggs, Scott Bessent	
Thursday, October 22, 2026	Sioux City	IA	Sioux Gateway Airport	Ashley Hinson, Zach Lahn, Chuck Grassley, Joni Ernst, Tim Scott, Brenna Bird, Joe Mitchell, Chris McGowan, Joe Gruters, Jeff Kaufman, Paul Perez, Brooke Boden, Kevin Alons, Lynn Evans	
Friday, October 23, 2026	Fort Myers	FL	Alico Arena	Evan Power, Joe Gruters, Jim Schwartzel, Greg Steube, Wilton Simpson, James Uthmeier, Rick Scott, Ashley Moody, Byron Donalds, Mehmet Oz, Robert F. Kennedy Jr.	
Saturday, October 24, 2026	Perry	GA	Guardian Centers	Rick Jackson, Mike Collins, Gernot Döllner, Jason Aldean, Kelly Loeffler	
Sunday, October 25, 2026	Port Huron	MI	McMorran Place Arena	Mike Rogers, John James, Nicki Minaj, Lisa McClain, Matt Hall, Jim Runestad, Mike Bouchard Jr., David Beamer, Brian Pannebecker	
Monday, October 26, 2026	Corinth	MS	Crossroads Arena	Cindy Hyde-Smith, Tate Reeves, Trent Kelly, D. Michael Hurst Jr., Darryl Worley	
Tuesday, October 27, 2026	Corpus Christi	TX	Port of Corpus Christi	Ken Paxton, Marco Rubio, Dan Patrick, Mayes Middleton, Monica De La Cruz, Michael Cloud, Eric Flores, Paul Perez, Todd Ames Hunter, Johnny Manziel, Danny Amendola, Alexis Nungaray, Mike Fehlauer	
Tuesday, October 27, 2026	Lubbock	TX	Lubbock Memorial Civic Center	Ken Paxton, Marco Rubio, Dan Patrick, Jodey Arrington, Tom Sell, Don Huffines, Dustin Burrows, Brandon Creighton, Cody Campbell, Danny Amendola	
Wednesday, October 28, 2026	Chillicothe	OH	Shoemaker Center	Vivek Ramaswamy, Jon Husted, Bernie Moreno, David Taylor, Robert Sprague, Frank LaRose, Jay Edwards, Keith Faber	
Thursday, October 29, 2026	Rock Hill	SC	Rock Hill Sports & Event Center	Darline Graham, Tim Scott, Henry McMaster, Alan Wilson, Russell Fry, Wes Climer, David Stumbo, Cody Simpson	
Friday, October 30, 2026	Daytona Beach	FL	Ocean Center	Byron Donalds, Ashley Moody, Rick Scott, Randy Fine, Jay Collins, James Uthmeier, Joe Strada, Meg Weinberger, Evan Power, Chase Tramont	
Sunday, November 1, 2026	Dubuque	IA	Five Flags Center	Ashley Hinson, Zach Lahn, Chuck Grassley, Mike Johnson, Mariannette Miller-Meeks, Zach Nunn, Brenna Bird, Joe Mitchell, Chris McGowan, Paul Perez, Bobby Kaufmann, Jeff Kaufmann, Heather Hora, Dan Gable	
Sunday, November 1, 2026	Salina	KS	Salina Regional Airport	Roger Marshall, Ty Masterson, Marco Rubio, Doug Burgum, Jerry Moran, Tracey Mann, Ron Estes, Kris Kobach	
Monday, November 2, 2026	Washington	DC	Lincoln Memorial Reflecting Pool	Doug Burgum	

== See also ==
- List of rallies for the 2016 Donald Trump presidential campaign, rallies for Trump's first successful campaign
- List of Donald Trump rallies (December 2016–2022), including rallies for Trump's unsuccessful re-election campaign
- List of rallies for the 2024 Donald Trump presidential campaign, rallies for Trump's second successful campaign
