= Donald Trump town hall meeting in Oaks, Pennsylvania =

2024 US political event

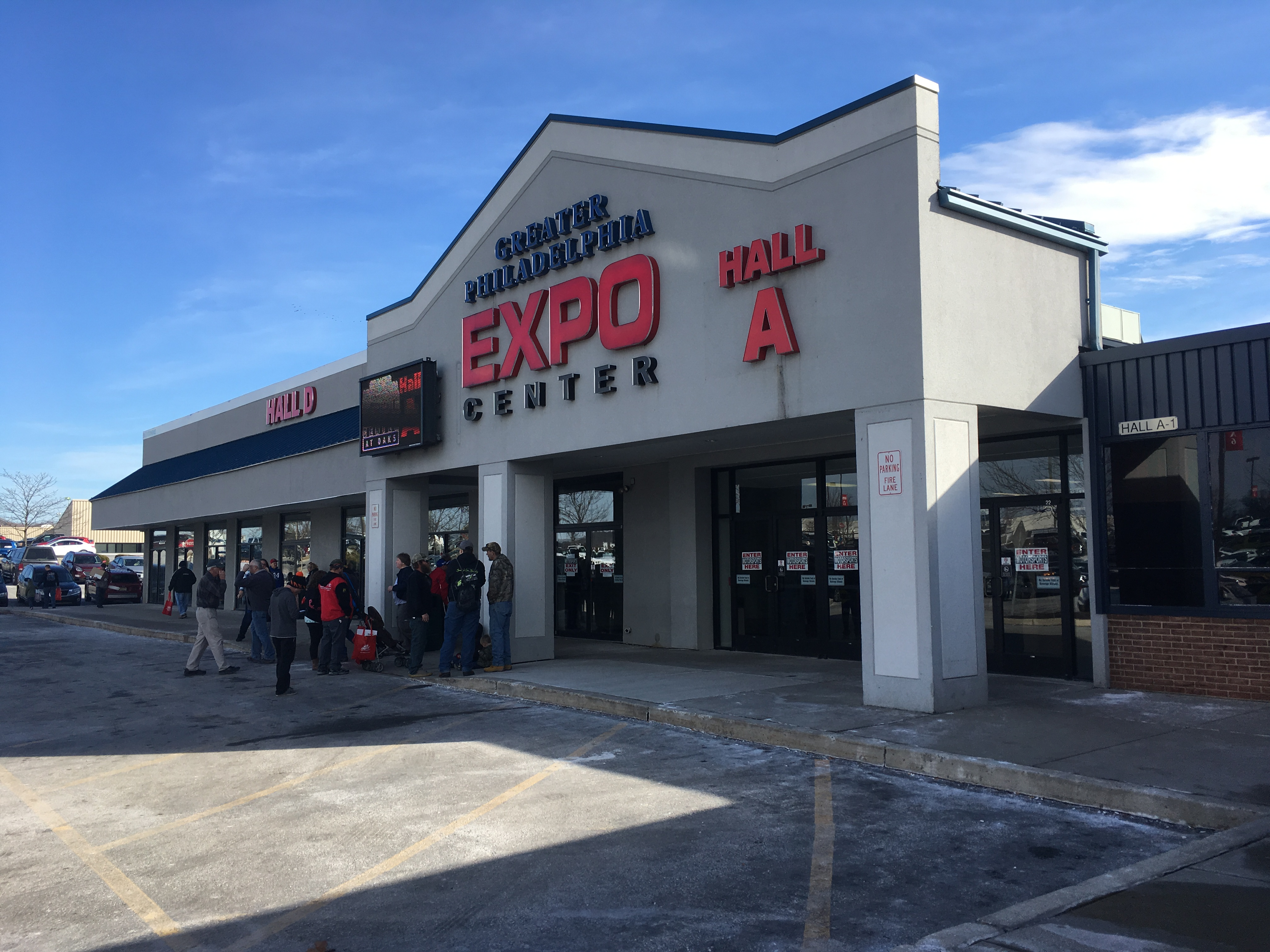
- The town hall meeting was held at the Greater Philadelphia Expo Center (exterior pictured in 2018) in Oaks, Pennsylvania, in October 2024.
- Date: October 14, 2024
- Venue: Greater Philadelphia Expo Center
- Location: Oaks, Pennsylvania, United States
- Type: Town hall meeting
- Organised by: Donald Trump 2024 presidential campaign
- Participants: Thousands

U.S. president Donald Trump held a town hall meeting at the Greater Philadelphia Expo Center in Oaks, Pennsylvania, on October 14, 2024, as part of his presidential campaign. After two attendees suffered medical emergencies, Trump ended the question-and-answer portion of the event in favor of a 39-minute listening session of his favorite songs from the campaign's playlist. During this segment, Trump danced and swayed, while recordings by Oliver Anthony, Andrea Bocelli, James Brown, Guns N' Roses, Sinéad O'Connor, Luciano Pavarotti, Elvis Presley, Village People, Rufus Wainwright were played.

The event received widespread attention and mixed reactions; critics of Trump noted the unusual nature of the listening session, with some questioning his mental acuity, while some supporters called it patriotic. Wainwright criticized the campaign for using his cover of "Hallelujah" by Leonard Cohen and the publishing company of Cohen's estate issued a cease and desist letter to Trump's campaign. Rolling Stone's music journalist Rob Sheffield dubbed the event "the most disastrous dance party in American political history".

== Event details and program ==
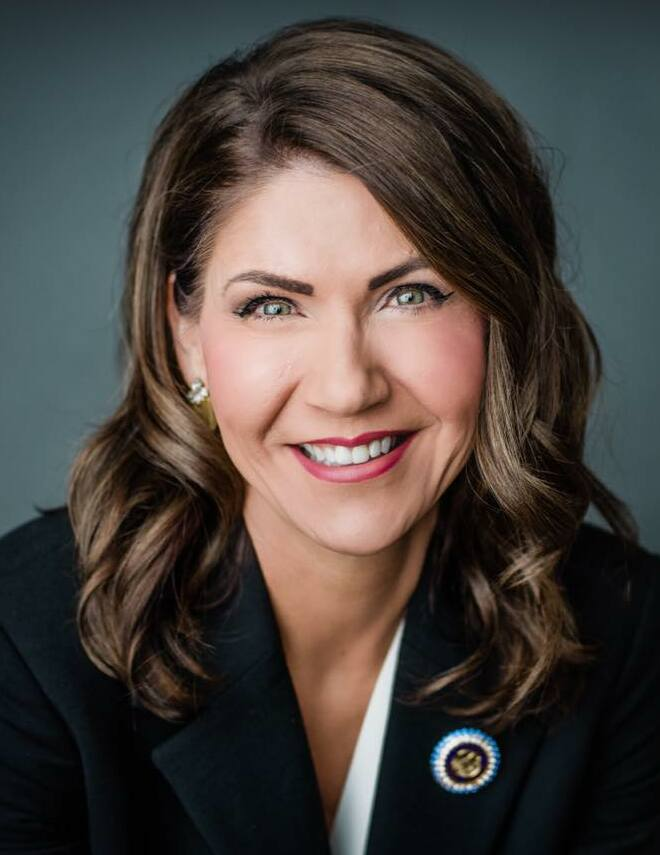
Kristi Noem, the Governor of South Dakota, was the town hall meeting's moderator. She remained on the stage with Donald Trump as some of his favorite songs played.

According to the Trump campaign, 5000 to 6000 people attended the event, but independent estimates are not available. During the meeting, Trump displayed his "favorite chart" about border crossings. He told the audience that he "sleeps with" and "kisses" the chart, which he said saved him during an attempted assassination. According to Forbes, Trump replied to a question about grocery prices "with a rant about migrants, who he likened to the fictional serial killer, Hannibal Lecter, a comparison he's made frequently in recent months", and asked attendees to vote on January 5 (in the United States, Election Day is in November). Trump also said he would "unleash the US fossil fuels industry to 'drill, baby, drill!' – which he promised would slash the price of energy by half within the first 12 months of his presidency", according to The Independent.

Kristi Noem, the Governor of South Dakota, was the meeting's moderator. She asked Trump "softball questions", according to The Independent. After two attendees experienced medical emergencies (fainting from the heat), the planned question-and-answer became a listening session of Trump's favorite songs from his campaign's playlist. Noem remained with Trump on the stage as songs played. According to France 24, "for more than half an hour, the Trump playlist blasted while the candidate mostly stood on stage listening and slowly dancing". NBC News said a "source familiar with the planning of the event said there had been a miscommunication between Noem and Trump after the medical issues". Trump also requested air conditioning after the second interruption, prompting Noem to joke about inflation, She said, "They probably can't afford it, sir."

=== Music ===
When the first attendee fainted and was placed on a stretcher, the audience sang Irving Berlin's 1938 patriotic song "God Bless America". Trump then requested to have "Ave Maria" played. An instrumental version of the song was played, followed by a recording of "Ave Maria" by Luciano Pavarotti. Subsequent songs included "Nothing Compares 2 U" (1990) by Sinéad O'Connor, "Y.M.C.A." (1978) by Village People, "Memory" from Andrew Lloyd Webber's 1981 musical Cats, "It's a Man's Man's Man's World" (1966) by James Brown, "An American Trilogy" (1972) by Elvis Presley, Rufus Wainwright's cover of "Hallelujah" (1984) by Leonard Cohen, "Time to Say Goodbye" by Andrea Bocelli, "Rich Men North of Richmond" (2023) by Oliver Anthony, and "November Rain" (1992) by Guns N' Roses.

Some artists had previously asked for their music to not be used by the campaign.

== Reactions ==
ABC News said the audience "slowly dispersed, but many stayed for the entirety of the campaign event". According to the Associated Press, "Many of his supporters made their way to the exits, but some stayed through the end. The scene was reminiscent of Trump's winters at Mar-a-Lago, his South Florida estate, where he likes to play DJ and hold court with the wealthy members of his private club." Various publications called the event "bizarre", "chaotic", "deranged", "odd", "surreal", and "unusual". CBC News said critics of Trump called the music portion of the event "awkward" and "weird". Political commentator Jonah Goldberg called the session "strange" and said Trump "went with an unorthodox way of getting around taking questions". Contrastingly, some supporters of Trump said the event was patriotic, according to The Philadelphia Inquirer. John McWhorter, an opinion writer for The New York Times, wrote:

I'm not even sure that turning a rally over to 40 minutes of swaying to music is a sign of disinhibition in the first place. It's not some primal human urge that the rules of polite society are barely able to constrain. It's just less boring than taking questions. This is extravagance — pushing the envelope, doing the unexpected. This is breaking the rules not because you're too fogged up to understand them but because your past transgressions, however much they appalled the keepers of order, no longer give you the cheap thrills they used to.

LGBTQ Nation and PinkNews noted the inclusion of two LGBTQ-related songs: "Hallelujah", as Wainwright is gay, and the gay anthem "Y.M.C.A." David Hudson of the LGBTQ online magazine Queerty opined, "Donald Trump's speeches at rallies are often rambling and unfocused. However, a town hall event last night in Oaks, Pennsylvania, potentially represented a new low." Rolling Stone's music journalist Rob Sheffield called Trump the "worst DJ ever" who hosted "the most disastrous dance party in American political history". Writers later included "Trump stops a town hall to play music videos" in the magazine's list of the twenty "craziest moments" of the presidential race. The event generated lots of commentary and memes on social media. The Intelligencer has referred to the event as "infamous".

The event prompted some media outlets and politicians to discuss Trump's mental acuity and request the release of his medical records. Anthony Scaramucci, who was Trump's White House Communications Director, said, "The October surprise is that Trump has completely lost his marbles." Alyssa Farah Griffin, who was Trump's White House Director of Strategic Communications, also expressed concern and compared the event to a Will Ferrell film.

=== Entertainers and musicians ===
The event was joked about by Stephen Colbert and Jimmy Kimmel on their respective late nights shows. It was also discussed by panelists on The View and joked about on the Saturday Night Live sketch Weekend Update.

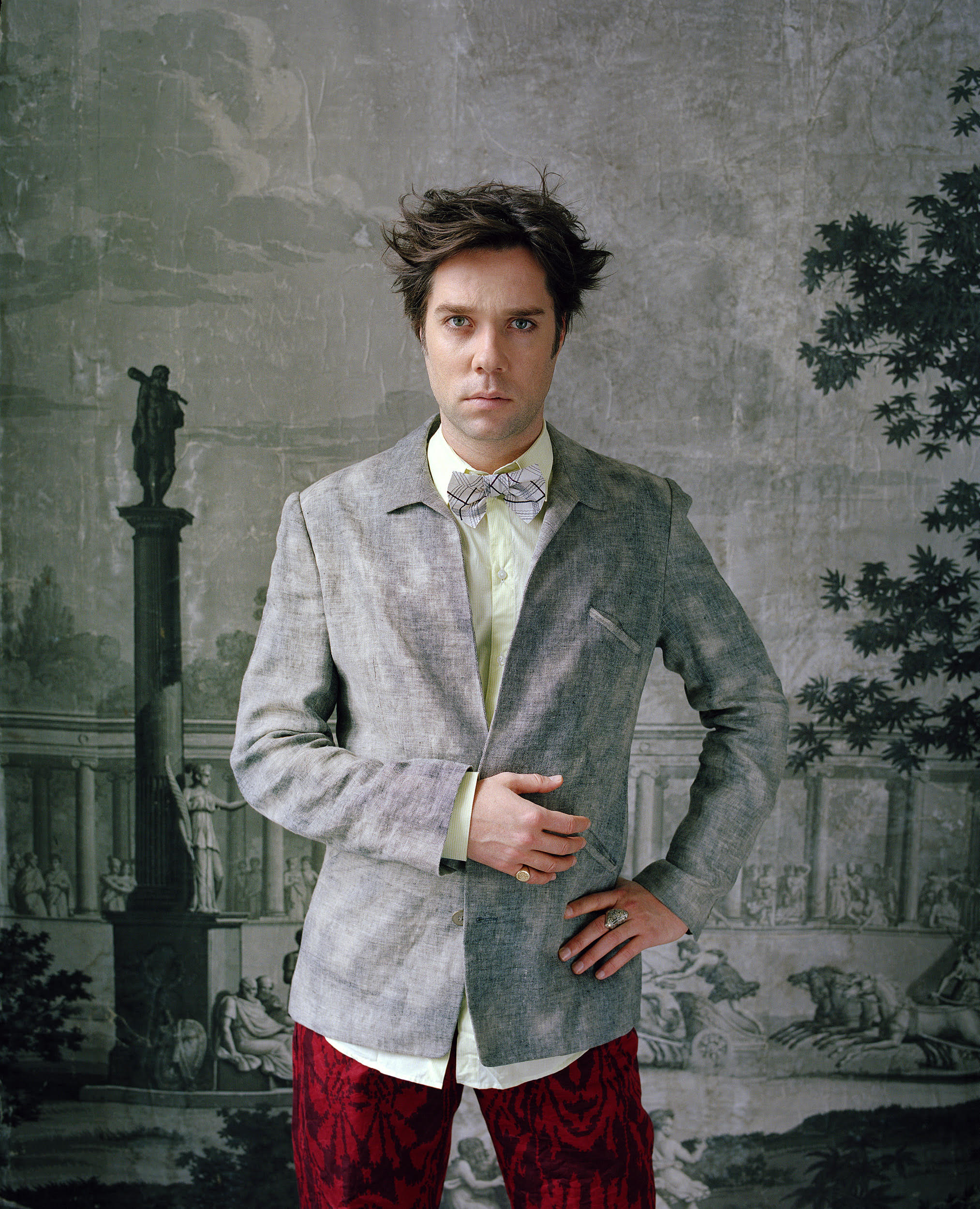
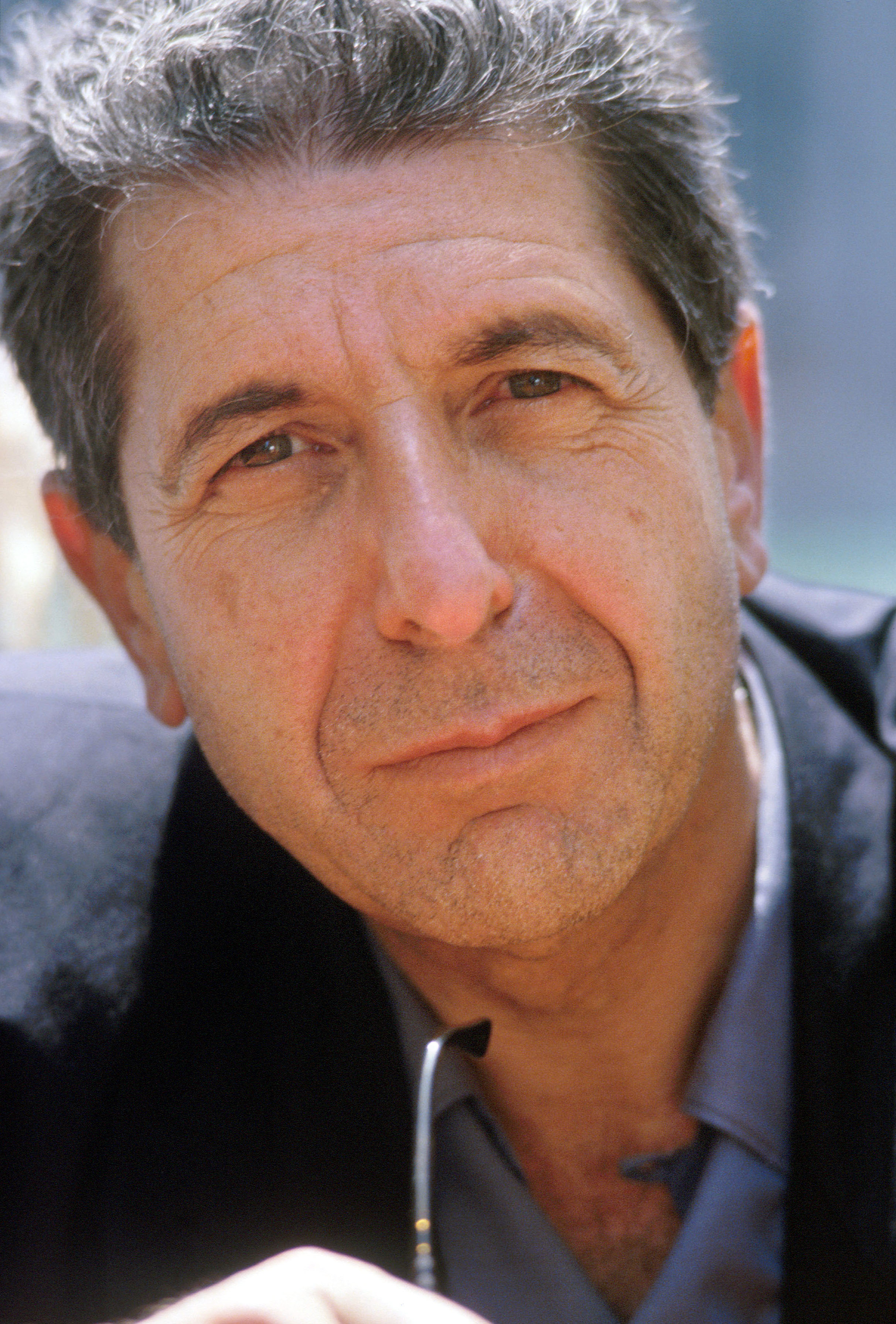
Rufus Wainwright (left, pictured in 2010) said the use of "Hallelujah" was "blasphemy" and the publishing company of the estate of Leonard Cohen (right, pictured in 1988), who wrote the song, sent a cease and desist letter to Trump's campaign.

Wainwright criticized the campaign's use of "Hallelujah". His statement said in part: "Witnessing Trump and his supporters commune with this music last night was the height of blasphemy. Of course, I in no way condone this and was mortified, but the good in me hopes that perhaps in inhabiting and really listening to the lyrics of Cohen's masterpiece, Donald Trump just might experience a hint of remorse over what he's caused. I'm not holding my breath." The statement also noted that the publishing company of Cohen's estate sent a cease and desist letter to Trump's campaign. Wainwright discussed the event on MSNBC's The 11th Hour with Stephanie Ruhle and he later received praise from Jamie Lee Curtis, who said: "Hearing Rufus articulate so beautifully the grace of the song, in a weird way, wishing that for a man who's clearly unhinged and saying, 'Maybe that's grace for him, and maybe it will help him and heal him a little.' I love that Rufus has found himself in the zeitgeist of this collision of culture and politics and humanity and compassion and division." In a January 2025 interview with The Times, Wainwright said he could potentially use Trump's fondness for "Hallelujah" to reason with the president.

Barbra Streisand, who recorded "Memory" for her 1981 album Memories, said: "This is not normal. Particularly for someone running for President. He stood there and swayed for over 30 minutes. Something is very off with this man's brain."

=== Politicians and political groups ===
Campaign spokesperson Steven Cheung said on social media, "Something very special is happening in Pennsylvania right now at the Trump townhall. @realDonaldTrump is unlike any politician in history, and it's great." He called the event a "total lovefest" and said, "Everyone was so excited they were fainting so @realDonaldTrump turned to music. Nobody wanted to leave and wanted to hear more songs from the famous DJT Spotify playlist!" Trump called the event "amazing" and later claimed that multiple people fainted from "excitement".

The spokesperson for the Republican National Committee said Trump's campaign had the necessary licenses from the American Society of Composers, Authors and Publishers (ASCAP) and Broadcast Music, Inc. (BMI) for the songs played during the event. She also said, "It's a shame that some artists want to limit half of the country from enjoying their music." According to The Atlantic, "The 40 minutes [Trump] spent onstage in Pennsylvania swaying silently to music prompted aides to exchange frenzied messages wondering whether the audio could be cut to get him off the stage. (Ultimately, they decided, letting him dance was less dangerous than letting him rant.)"

The campaign of Trump's opponent Kamala Harris said on social media, "Trump appears lost, confused, and frozen on stage as multiple songs play for 30+ minutes and the crowd pours out of the venue early." Harris shared the post and said, "Hope he's okay." U.S. President Joe Biden referenced the event at subsequent fundraisers and called Trump "unhinged". Brian Schatz, a U.S. Senator from Hawaii, said: "That thing Trump did last night is not explainable and it is not small."

== See also ==
- Donald Trump in music
- List of post–2016 election Donald Trump rallies
- List of rallies for the 2024 Donald Trump presidential campaign
- List of significant United States town hall meetings
- Musicians who oppose Donald Trump's use of their music
