= Musicians who oppose Donald Trump's use of their music =

A major aspect of Donald Trump's presidential election campaigns in 2016, 2020, and 2024 was unauthorized use of music at his prominent and frequent political rallies. Below are musicians who have voiced opposition to their music being used by Trump at his rallies, or for other political purposes, and the actions they took in response to their music's use.

Separately to the individual cases below, a group of artists including Mick Jagger, Lorde, Sia, Blondie, Sheryl Crow, Green Day, Lionel Richie, Elvis Costello, Keith Richards, Steven Tyler and Rosanne Cash in collaboration with the Artist Rights Alliance, have signed a letter demanding that politicians seek permission before playing their music at campaign rallies and public events. Trump's use of music without permission has become the subject of satire, with The Onion humorously claiming that the estate of Irving Berlin was suing Trump for his glockenspiel rendition of "God Bless America", and that the Francis Scott Key estate had sent Trump a cease and desist letter demanding he stop playing "The Star-Spangled Banner" at his rallies.

Venues and political campaigns can buy rights to play songs through licensing packages offered by performing rights organizations such as BMI and ASCAP. BMI and ASCAP allow artists to remove a song from a campaign's Political Entities License. After BMI or ASCAP notifies the campaign of the song's removal, the campaign must stop using the song or risk legal action for copyright infringement. A political campaign that uses a licensed song without the artist's permission may also risk legal action on grounds of trademark infringement, false advertising, or right of publicity.

== A ==
=== ABBA ===
At a campaign event in St. Cloud, MN, on August 27, 2024, the Trump campaign played the ABBA songs "Money, Money, Money", "The Winner Takes It All", and "Dancing Queen". After the event, ABBA demanded for the campaign to stop using their music, stating: "[W]e have discovered that videos have been released where Abba's music/videos has been used at Trump events, and we have therefore requested that such use be immediately taken down and removed," adding that "no permission or license has been given to Trump."

=== Adéla ===
Slovak singer Adéla criticized Trump for using her song "Nicole Kidman" without permission in November 2026, calling the video "so fucking wrong on so many levels." She stated that she did not stand for about "zero of the things that party stands for, and that person stands for."

=== Adele ===
Adele stated that Trump did not have permission to use her songs "Rolling in the Deep" or "Skyfall" at Trump political rallies in 2016, and requested that her music not be used in any political campaigning. Adele later endorsed Trump's 2016 opponent, Hillary Clinton.

=== Aerosmith ===
Steven Tyler of Aerosmith demanded that Trump stop playing "Dream On" at Trump's political rallies in 2015. In 2018, Tyler demanded that Trump stop using another song, "Livin' on the Edge", at his political rallies. A cease and desist letter was sent both times.

=== A-ha ===
Magne Furuholmen of the band A-ha, opposed the use of the rotoscoping clip from "Take On Me" music video at a Trump rally in October 2019. Furuholmen said "You write a song in your youth and you don't write for a particular group of people...We make our music for everybody. We didn't intend to make our music part of a divisive campaign and, all things equal, would preferred it not to have been. We are Norwegian-born, but we have friends all over the world and are concerned about what the world is coming to." He released a protest song titled "This is Now America", as a direct response to the Trump administration.

=== Andrew Lloyd Webber ===
Betty Buckley, the original star of the Broadway musical Cats urged composer Andrew Lloyd Webber to prevent her signature song "Memory" from being played at the political rallies of Trump (whose love for the Cats soundtrack has been reported). Webber's UK-based company, Really Useful Group, sent a cease and desist letter to Trump's 2020 campaign.

=== Ariana Grande ===
In June 2026, the White House used Ariana Grande’s 2024 song "Bye" in a video promoting ICE deportations. Grande commented on the video, saying, “Please do not ever use my music in relation to this barbaric, inhumane, heinous nonsense. Fck ice.” A spokesperson for Grande confirmed she commented herself.

On August 20, 2026, the White House, under the Team Trump account, used Grande's 2024 song "We Can't Be Friends (Wait for Your Love)" in a video with the caption "This shouldn't be controversial!", depicting Trump walking to the podium at a rally. Grande commented on the video, saying, “Never use my music again. Also, your truth is false.”

=== The Animals ===
Eric Burdon of The Animals objected after Trump used "House of the Rising Sun" during a September 2, 2020, campaign event. "[N]obody asked my permission," Burdon stated, adding that "[a] tale of sin and misery set in a brothel suits him so perfectly." He suggested that The Animals' "We Gotta Get Out of This Place" would have been more appropriate.

== B ==
=== The Beatles ===
George Harrison's estate denounced the use of the Harrison-written Beatles song "Here Comes the Sun" after the Trump campaign used the song to introduce Ivanka Trump at the 2016 Republican National Convention. The estate noted that Trump did not have permission to use this song, but that they would consider allowing him to use the Harrison song "Beware of Darkness".

=== Beyoncé ===
On July 23, 2024, the Democratic presidential candidate Kamala Harris obtained permission from Beyoncé and Parkwood Entertainment to use "Freedom" as the official song for her 2024 presidential campaign. On August 20, 2024, Steven Cheung, a Republican spokesperson, posted on Twitter a 13-second video of Trump's arrival in Detroit for a rally using "Freedom" as the theme song. The following day, Beyoncé's record label and music publisher sent a cease and desist letter to Trump for using the song without permission.

=== Boards of Canada ===
Boards of Canada and their record label, Warp Records, issued a joint statement on 29 May 2026 condemning an X post made by the White House the previous day, which features nationalist imagery set to their song "Deep Time", which was used without permission from the duo or from the label. The statement read: "Warp Records and Boards of Canada do not condone the unauthorised use of their music for political messaging".

=== Bruce Springsteen ===
Bruce Springsteen opposed Trump using his song "Born in the U.S.A." at Trump's political rallies in 2016. Rather than take legal action, he openly announced his support for Trump's opponent, Hillary Clinton, and campaigned in support of her. From that time on, the song would get booed every time Trump played it at rallies.

== C ==
=== Celine Dion ===
Celine Dion's management team and Sony Music Canada issued a statement following the unauthorized use of "My Heart Will Go On" at a Trump political rally in Montana in August 2024, saying that "[…] Celine Dion does not endorse this or any similar use. …And really, THAT song?".

=== Creedence Clearwater Revival ===
John Fogerty, the frontman for the band Creedence Clearwater Revival, has opposed Trump's use of the band's song "Fortunate Son". In October 2020, Fogerty announced he was sending a cease-and-desist letter to Trump, saying that Trump "is using my words and my voice to portray a message that I do not endorse". Fogerty noted that it was quite the opposite—the song's lyrics were meant as a critique of how wealthy people are unfairly able to avoid the draft or pay their share of taxes. Later on, he openly endorsed Trump's 2020 challenger, Joe Biden, by launching his own TikTok account following Trump's defiance of the cease-and-desist order over usage of his song, "Fortunate Son".

== E ==
=== Earth, Wind & Fire ===
Earth, Wind & Fire criticized Trump's use of their song "September" without permission at the 2016 Republican National Convention.

=== Eddy Grant ===
Eddy Grant issued a copyright complaint over Trump's use of his song "Electric Avenue" in a political video he tweeted. The video was taken down, and a lawsuit and cease-and-desist letter followed. Grant's September 2020 lawsuit, filed in the U.S. District Court for the Southern District of New York, alleged copyright infringement. On September 13, 2024, the Court ruled that Eddy Grant and Greenheart Music Limited were entitled to summary judgment on liability. "The video is best described as a wholesale copying of music to accompany a political campaign ad," the judge wrote. Copyrightlately noted: "With liability established, the case will now focus on determining damages."

On November 20, 2024, the court issued an order stating that the two sides had settled the lawsuit and that the case would be discontinued. The order did not disclose the terms of the settlement.

=== Elton John ===
Elton John opposed the use of his songs "Rocket Man" and "Tiny Dancer" at Trump political rallies in 2016. John noted that while their political views were very different, it was not personal. He believed that, as a British musician, his music had no place in U.S. politics at all, and that Ted Nugent, for example, was more appropriate.

=== Everlast ===
House of Pain rapper Everlast issued a cease-and-desist letter over Trump's use of his song "Jump Around" during his campaign rallies, and launched a profanity-laced tirade against him.

== F ==
=== Foo Fighters ===
In August 2024, the Foo Fighters objected to the use of their song "My Hero" at the rally where Trump introduced Robert Kennedy Jr. A statement from the band asserted that Trump did not ask for permission to use the track, nor would the band have granted it if it had been requested. The statement also mentioned that any increased royalties from its usage would be donated directly to the Kamala Harris 2024 presidential campaign. The Trump campaign responded by stating that it had licensed the song from BMI's Songview service.

=== Frank Sinatra ===
In April 2026, Trump posted a video clip without a caption or explanation of Frank Sinatra performing "My Way". Sinatra's eldest daughter Nancy Sinatra responded on X writing “This is a sacrilege" and "Trump may love Sinatra, but Sinatra did not love Trump." In a reply to a fan asking her if anything could be done, she wrote "Unfortunately no. The only people who can do something are the publishers." A 2017 autobiography of Frank's manager Eliot Weisman supports Nancy's assessment of her father's opinion, recounting that during negotiations to book Sinatra for the 1990 opening of the Trump Taj Mahal Casino, Sinatra instructed his manager he had two choices: "tell him to go fuck himself, or give me his number and I'll do it."

=== Free ===
After Trump's 2016 campaign used Free's song "All Right Now", vocalist Paul Rodgers stated: "Permission to use 'All Right Now' was never sought for or granted by me. My lawyer is dealing with this matter."

== G ==
=== Guns N' Roses ===
In November 2018, after Trump played the band's hit song "Sweet Child o' Mine" during an event, Axl Rose said that he and his band had formally requested that Trump not use their music at his events, and posted on Twitter that "the Trump campaign is using loopholes in the various venues' blanket performance licenses which were not intended for such craven political purposes, without the songwriters' consent."

In May 2020, Axl Rose opposed the use of the Guns N' Roses cover of the Paul McCartney and Wings song "Live and Let Die" in a meatpacking plant where Trump refused to take the COVID-19 pandemic precaution of wearing a mask. In response, Rose created shirts with the phrase "Live N' Let Die With COVID 45", with all proceeds going to the MusiCares charity.

== H ==
=== Heart ===
On Saturday, June 14, 2025, an instrumental version of the Heart song "Barracuda" was played during the Trump-organized United States Army 250th Anniversary Parade. That same day, singer and songwriter Nancy Wilson posted a video saying "The song 'Barracuda' by Heart was played without permission or authorization from us. 'Barracuda,' written and performed by Ann and I, is a powerful piece of music that was never intended for political use." Furthering the point, she wore a hat saying "No Kings But Us", in support of the June 2025 No Kings protest happening the same day.

== I ==
=== Isaac Hayes ===
On May 28, 2022, the family of Isaac Hayes harshly criticized Trump for using the Sam & Dave song "Hold On, I'm Comin'" at a National Rifle Association convention: "The estate and family of Isaac Hayes DID NOT approve and would NEVER approve the use of "Hold on I'm coming" by Sam and Dave by Donald Trump at this weekend's @NRA convention. Our condolences go out to the victims and families of #Uvalde and mass shooting victims everywhere." Song co-writer David Porter also objected to the use of the song, stating "Someone shared with me Donald Trump used the song 'Hold On, I'm Coming' for a speaking appearance of his. Hell to the No! I did Not and would NOT approve of them using the song for any of his purposes! I also know Isaac's estate wouldn't approve as well! #Memphis #Music #Grammy"

On August 10, 2024, the family of Isaac Hayes threatened Trump with legal action if he continued to use "Hold On, I'm Comin', which Trump used at a Bozeman, Montana, rally on that date. The following week, Isaac Hayes Enterprises, LLC, and the Estate of Isaac Hayes sued Trump, his campaign, the RNC, the NRA, and Turning Point USA for copyright and trademark infringement in the U.S. District Court for the Northern District of Georgia. On September 3, 2024, the Court issued a preliminary injunction temporarily barring the Trump campaign from performing the song at future rallies.

On February 23, 2026, the Hayes estate announced that it had reached a settlement with Donald Trump. The terms were not disclosed. In a statement, the Hayes estate said the resolution "reaffirms the importance of protecting intellectual property rights and copyrights, especially as they relate to legacy, ownership, and the responsible use of creative works."

== J ==
=== JADE ===
On October 26, 2026, JADE quietly removed her song "Angel of My Dreams" from the White House's official TikTok page of a slow-motion clip depicting Trump walking through an illuminated tunnel.

=== Jess Glynne ===
On July 30, 2025, the White House's official X account posted a video showing the deportation of alleged illegal migrants with the sound of Jess Glynne's song "Hold My Hand" and captioned "When ICE books you a one-way Jet2 holiday to deportation. Nothing beats it!", referencing the song's use as a popular advertising theme for the British airline Jet2.com. Glynne herself responded on Instagram: "This post honestly makes me sick. My music is about love, unity, and spreading positivity – never about division or hate".

=== JMSN ===
In September 2026, the White House used public money to produce and air several pro-Trump television ads that they called "public service announcements." The first such ad featured a Trump campaign speech set to the song "Love Me" by Christian Berishaj, who performs under the name JMSN. On September 28, Berishaj, represented by former White House ethics advisor Norman Eisen, wrote the Trump administration to demand the US government demand that the government immediately cease and desist any further use of the song. The letter stated "JMSN does not want to be viewed as directly or indirectly affiliated with the President or his Administration."

=== Joey Valence & Brae ===
On December 3, 2025, the United States Department of Homeland Security posted a United States Immigration and Customs Enforcement recruitment video which used the song "Hooligan" by Joey Valence & Brae. Within hours of the video being posted, Joey Valence would post a tweet reading, "To be clear this video does NOT represent my OR JVB's thoughts or beliefs in any form and we are actively working to have it taken down," also saying the song was used without the duo's knowledge or consent.

=== Johnny Marr ===
Johnny Marr, English songwriter and former member of The Smiths, opposed the use of the band's song "Please Please Please Let Me Get What I Want" at a 2024 rally without permission. Upon finding out about it, Marr stated, "I never in a million years would've thought this could come to pass. Consider this shit shut right down right now."

== K ==
=== Katy Perry ===
On June 25, 2026, in a post on Twitter, Katy Perry condemned the Trump administration for featuring the 2010 anthem "Firework" in a White House TikTok post showing footage of military strikes. Perry stated, "I am deeply appalled and angry to see 'Firework' used on the @WhiteHouse TikTok account as a backing track for video footage of military strikes. I did not approve this, I was not asked, and I absolutely do not condone it."

=== Kenny Loggins ===
Kenny Loggins expressed displeasure in October 2025 with the use of his recording of the song "Danger Zone" in a video of an AI-generated animated rendering of Donald Trump in a fighter jet bombing No Kings protesters with what appears to be feces. He posted a statement stating that the use was unauthorized as no one asked him.

=== Kesha ===
On March 3, 2026, Kesha posted on Twitter and Instagram in opposition to The Trump Administration using her song "Blow" in a video posted to TikTok showing US fighter jets bombing various locations. In her statement she said: "I absolutely do NOT approve of my music being used to promote violence of any kind. Love always trumps hate. please love yourself and each other in times like this. This show of blatant disregard for human life and quite frankly this attack on all of our nervous systems is the opposite of what I stand for."

== L ==
=== Leonard Cohen ===
On August 28, 2020, Leonard Cohen's estate issued a statement criticizing Trump's unauthorized use of Cohen's "Hallelujah" at the Republican National Convention. They said they specifically rejected permission for its use, and would have only realistically considered approving Cohen's song "You Want It Darker".

On June 24, 2026, Cohen's estate objected to the planned use of "Hallelujah" at Trump's Freedom 250 rally on the National Mall. "This use is not authorized, and the Estate does not support or approve of this or any similar usage", they posted in a statement, which concluded with Trump’s signature sign-off, “Thank you for your attention to this matter".

=== Les Misérables musical ===
Les Misérables creators Cameron Mackintosh and Alain Boublil issued an objection to the use of the song "Do You Hear the People Sing?" at a 2016 Trump rally in Miami. Despite this, the song was included in Trump's 2022 playlist and performed at the 2025 White House Governors' Ball.

=== Linkin Park ===
On July 18, 2020, Trump retweeted a fan-made re-election campaign video ad featuring a cover of Linkin Park's "In the End". Twitter received a Digital Millennium Copyright Act notice from the band's management company, Machine Shop Entertainment, and the video was pulled. Linkin Park followed up with a response, "Linkin Park did not and does not endorse Trump, nor authorize his organization to use any of our music. A cease and desist has been issued." The group's late lead singer, Chester Bennington, had called Trump a "greater threat to the USA than terrorism."

=== Luciano Pavarotti ===
Family members of Luciano Pavarotti (1935 – 2007) protested when Trump rallies played the Italian opera singer's recording of "Nessun Dorma" (which ends with the line "Vincerò! Vincerò!" – "I will win! I will win!"). Pavarotti's widow and three daughters stated that Trump's views on immigration were incompatible with Pavarotti's efforts as United Nations Messenger of Peace, which had raised large amounts of money for the support of immigrants and refugees.

=== MGMT ===
In October 2025, MGMT posted on Instagram that they were aware of their song "Little Dark Age" being used in an ICE recruiting video posted by the Department of Homeland Security. The video was later taken down after the band filed a request under the DMCA.

== N ==
=== Neil Young ===
Neil Young has indicated multiple times that he does not approve of the use of his song "Rockin' in the Free World" at Trump rallies, which has been done since 2015. Young conceded he had no legal grounds to oppose the song's use; however, in 2020, he wrote a scathing open letter directed at Trump that stated: "Every time 'Rockin' in the Free World' or one of my songs is played at your rallies, I hope you hear my voice. Remember it is the voice of a tax-paying U.S. citizen who does not support you. Me." He later objected to the use of the song in Trump's speech at Mount Rushmore on the Fourth of July the same year. In August 2020, Young sued Trump for copyright infringement in the U.S. District Court for the Southern District of New York, but had the case voluntarily dismissed in December 2020. Business Insider later stated that the suit was "quietly settled for an undisclosed sum four months after it was filed."

In October of 2026, Young sued Trump for copyright infringement again, alleging that Trump's use of the song in an October 12 rally in Youngstown, Ohio violated the terms of the settlement in which Trump agreed never again to use Young’s music without permission. The filing says that Young has "suffered damage to his reputation and brand as a result of the implication that he supports Donald J. Trump in any way" and is asking for $10 million in damages.

=== Nickelback ===
Nickelback indicated that they did not support Trump's use of their song "Photograph". In October 2019, Trump tweeted a doctored version of the song and music video on Twitter, and the band's record label, Warner Music Group, issued a copyright claim, leading to the video being taken down. Sales of the real version of the song jumped over 500% in the days following the takedown.

=== Nico Vega ===
Nico Vega criticized a "fight for Trump" video, shared by Trump on Twitter December 20, 2020, for using their song "Beast". "To be clear, Nico Vega does not support the use of our song "Beast" in Trump's recent video, We have love and empathy for all people of all backgrounds, races and beliefs, and we feel sick how all Americans' fears and vulnerabilities have been exploited over the last four years, We will not participate in a form of propaganda that pits Americans against one another." On December 23, 2020, Billboard magazine reported that Nico Vega dropped a "cease and desist" playlist on Spotify listing all the bands that had opposed Trump's use of their songs at rallies or in campaign videos, and the titles of all those songs.

=== Nik Kershaw ===
In 2022, Nik Kershaw, English singer-songwriter opposed Trump's use of the Chesney Hawkes song, "The One and Only", on the Save America Rally in Minden, Nevada: "Dude. I wrote this song. I do not endorse you, Trump, your views or your ideology and deeply resent your use of this song as your walk on music. Kindly cease and desist."

=== Noah Kahan ===
Responding to a post on the White House's Instagram and TikTok feed featuring images of President Trump touring a General Motors facility and using his song "American Cars", the singer/songwriter Noah Kahan posted "Would never approve of my music being used in support of you or this administration." One of the song's co-authors, Noah Levine, wrote "You fat f*** this song isn’t for you."

== O ==
=== The O'Jays ===
In 2016, Eddie Levert and Walter Williams of The O'Jays asked Trump to stop using their song "Love Train" at his presidential campaign rallies. Levert says he told Trump: "Listen, man, I don't believe in what you're doing. I'm not with you. I don't want you to use my voice. I'm not condoning what you're doing." Williams stated: "Our music, and most especially, 'Love Train' is about bringing people together, not building walls. I don't appreciate being associated with Mr. Trump and his usage of our music without permission."

=== Olivia Rodrigo ===
In late 2024, Olivia Rodrigo removed her song "Deja Vu" from TikTok after Trump used it in one of his videos on the platform following his victory in the 2024 election. Before removing the audio, Rodrigo commented on Trump's video, "Ew don't use my sound ever again ty". The comment was later deleted.

On November 4, 2025, the White House and the Department of Homeland Security shared a joint Instagram video, featuring Rodrigo's song "All-American Bitch", which showed Immigration and Customs Enforcement officers detaining and deporting people to promote self-deportation as an alternative. Rodrigo commented on the post, "don't ever use my songs to promote your racist, hateful propaganda."

=== Ozzy Osbourne ===
Ozzy Osbourne criticized Trump's use of his iconic song "Crazy Train" in a video highlighting the technical difficulties in the 2020 Democratic Party presidential debates, stating with his wife Sharon Osbourne in a joint statement: "[We] are sending notice to the Trump campaign (or any other campaigns) that they are forbidden from using any of Ozzy Osbourne's music in political ads or in any political campaigns."

== P ==
=== Panic! at the Disco ===
Brendon Urie of Panic! at the Disco demanded that Trump stop using his song "High Hopes" at Trump's political rallies in 2020, releasing a brief statement, saying, "Donald Trump represents nothing we stand for...Dear Trump Campaign, F--- you. You're not invited. Stop playing my song. No thanks, Brendon Urie, Panic! At The Disco & company".

=== Pharrell Williams ===
Pharrell Williams opposed a cover of his song "Happy" being played at Trump rallies, including one held just hours after the 2018 Pittsburgh synagogue shooting. Williams' legal team threatened legal action, claiming its use without permission was copyright and trademark infringement.

=== Phil Collins ===
Phil Collins's legal team sent a cease-and-desist letter to Trump's campaign after the unauthorized use of "In the Air Tonight" at a rally at Des Moines, Iowa on October 14, 2020. The letter also noted "Mr. Collin’s [sic] express and unequivocal statement that he wants no affiliation whatsoever with The President or the Trump campaign."

=== Prince ===
The estate of Prince condemned Trump's use of his song "Purple Rain" at a rally in 2019, and published a letter from the Trump campaign from 2018 that had promised not to use Prince's music.

== Q ==
=== Queen ===
Brian May of Queen opposed Trump's use of "We Are the Champions" as his "theme song" while walking out to the Republican National Convention in 2016. He denounced its use as unauthorized, where permission was neither sought nor given, and that they were looking at taking further steps should the band's music be used any further by his campaign. Queen, posting on X, stated that they had previously asked Trump to stop playing the song.

== R ==
=== Radiohead ===
In February 2026, Radiohead released a statement and condemned the use of their song "Let Down" in a video posted by ICE, stating "We demand that the amateurs in control of the ICE social media account take it down. It ain't funny, this song means a lot to us and other people, and you don't get to appropriate it without a fight. Also, go fuck yourselves… Radiohead."

=== R.E.M. ===
R.E.M. has opposed the use of their music by Trump on a number of occasions. In 2015, vocalist Michael Stipe voiced opposition of "It's the End of the World as We Know It (And I Feel Fine)" at Trump rallies, stating "Do not use our music or my voice for your moronic charade of a campaign." In 2019, bassist Mike Mills spoke out about Trump's promotion of a video containing the unauthorized use of the song "Everybody Hurts", urging Twitter to take it down, which it eventually did. Later in 2020, Mills threatened legal action over using "Everybody Hurts" and "Losing My Religion" at Trump's rallies.

=== Rihanna ===
Rihanna threatened legal action against Trump for the unauthorized use of her song "Don't Stop the Music" at Trump rallies in 2018. Her legal team released a comment that Rihanna has no association or affiliation with Trump, and she did not support his campaign.

=== The Rolling Stones ===
Both Mick Jagger and Keith Richards of The Rolling Stones opposed Trump's use of the song "You Can't Always Get What You Want". The band sent him cease and desist letters about its use in 2016; upon Trump using it again in June 2020, the band teamed up with Broadcast Music, Inc. to threaten legal action if the song is used again.

=== Rufus Wainwright ===
In October 2024, Rufus Wainwright issued a statement saying that he did not condone the use of his cover of Leonard Cohen's Hallelujah at a Trump rally in Pennsylvania on October 14, 2024. He described the song's use at the rally as "the height of blasphemy" but hoped, without much expectation, that listening to the lyrics of the song might engender a sense of remorse in Trump.

== S ==
=== Sabrina Carpenter ===
On December 2, 2025, the White House posted a video edited to Sabrina Carpenter's song "Juno", with the lyric "Have you ever tried this one?" (originally referencing sex positions) repeated over various shots of United States Immigration and Customs Enforcement agents carrying out arrests of suspected illegal immigrants. Carpenter responded, "This video is evil and disgusting. Do not ever involve me or my music to benefit your inhumane agenda."

=== Semisonic ===
In 2025, American rock band Semisonic objected to the use of its song "Closing Time" in a White House video supporting the deportation of illegal immigrants in the second presidency of Donald Trump, stating: "We did not authorize or condone the White House's use of our song in any way. And no, they didn't ask. The song is about joy and possibilities and hope, and they have missed the point entirely."

=== Sinéad O'Connor ===
The estate of Sinéad O'Connor and Chrysalis Records opposed Trump's use of her cover of Prince's "Nothing Compares 2 U", at a 2024 rally. The estate explained that "it is no exaggeration to say that Sinéad would have been disgusted, hurt, and insulted to have her work misrepresented in this way."

=== SZA ===
On December 8, 2025, the White House uploaded a holiday-themed, pro-ICE video that featured a remixed version of the song "Big Boys" by SZA, which originated from a December 2022 SNL sketch under the same name. While the song alludes to the concept of cuffing season, the video misconstrues the message to arresting immigrants in handcuffs. SZA accused the video of being "rage bait" to receive free promotion for an agenda that was "inhuman" and "evil". SZA's former manager, Terrence "Punch" Henderson, similarly concluded that "trying to provoke artist to respond in order to help spread propaganda and political agendas is nasty business. Knock it off."

== T ==
=== Tom Petty ===
The family of Tom Petty denounced Trump's use of the song "I Won't Back Down" at political rallies in 2020. The family sent the campaign a cease and desist letter, stating that the song was written for the "underdog" and "common man", and that Trump did not represent either.

=== Twisted Sister ===
In 2014 Twisted Sister allowed Trump to use "We're Not Gonna Take It" for his 2016 campaign because it is "a song about rebellion, and there's nothing more rebellious than what Donald Trump is doing right now". However, in 2015, the band's frontman Dee Snider withdrew permission for Trump's campaign to use the song, stating that "it's very upsetting to me, because I strongly don't agree with his extremist positions".

== V ==
=== Village People ===
In June 2020 Village People frontman Victor Willis asked that Trump no longer use any of his music at his rallies, particularly the songs "Macho Man" and "Y.M.C.A." After a cease and desist letter from Willis, usage continued. Scorpio Music, Village People's label, are considering legal action against Trump for using "Y.M.C.A." at his rallies. In May 2023, Village People manager Karen Willis sent Trump a cease and desist letter stating that a performance of "Macho Man" at Mar-a-Lago by individuals dressed like the group was unauthorized and violated U.S. trademark law.

After Trump played "Y.M.C.A." at a Pennsylvania campaign rally on October 14, 2024, Willis said he would permit Trump to use the song until the end of the 2024 presidential campaign, stating that suing Trump would be "stupid and just plain hateful." Willis further stated: "Trump's use of 'Y.M.C.A.' has greatly benefited the song. For example, when Trump started using 'Y.M.C.A' the song shot back up to No. 2 on Billboard's digital chart."

On January 13, 2025, the group announced that it would be participating in Trump's inaugural activities on January 20, stating its belief "that music is to be performed without regard to politics," and that it hoped its song "Y.M.C.A." would "[help] bring the country together after a tumultuous and divided campaign where our preferred candidate lost."

On July 20, 2025, Trump posted an AI-generated fake video of former president Barack Obama being arrested while "Y.M.C.A." plays in the background. In a statement, the group responded "We will attempt to find the original person or entity who posted the offensive video featuring President Barack Obama, and have such video taken down as not being endorsed by Village People, nor any of the owners of the copyright."

== W ==
=== The White Stripes ===
Following a political ad for the Trump campaign using the song "Seven Nation Army" by The White Stripes in October 2016, lead singer Jack White and his former wife and drummer, Meg White, issued a statement that they did not give permission for Trump to use their music, nor were they implying their support for him. The record label Third Man Records asked Trump not to use The White Stripes, or any of Third Man Records material for his rallies. In the weeks following, they also released merchandise referencing their final studio album Icky Thump, renaming it "Icky Trump", and including altered lyrics related to the ideologies of Trump and his supporters.

After a Trump campaign staffer used "Seven Nation Army" on August 29, 2024, Jack White posted on Instagram: "Oh….Don't even think about using my music you fascists. Law suit coming from my lawyers about this (to add to your 5 thousand others.)" On September 9, 2024, Jack White and Meg White filed a complaint in the U.S. District Court for the Southern District of New York alleging copyright and trademark infringement. The complaint also noted that the band objected to Trump's use of their music because they "vehemently oppose the policies adopted and actions taken by Defendant Trump when he was President and those he has proposed for the second term he seeks." On November 10, 2024, the plaintiffs filed to voluntarily dismiss all claims against the defendants.

== Y ==
=== Yoann Lemoine ===
French singer-songwriter and music video director Yoann Lemoine, under his stage name "Woodkid", condemned Trump for the use of his song "Run Boy Run" during the 2024 presidential rally. Lemoine also stated that "Run Boy Run" is an LGBT+ anthem.

== Z ==
=== Zara Larsson ===
Responding to the use of her song "Midnight Sun" in White House post depicting people being handcuffed and deported by ICE, pop artist Zara Larsson posted a video condemning the post and holding an “L” up to her forehead. "It’s so fucking uncool. You guys are such fucking losers," Larsson said.

The White House previously used Larsson’s song “Lush Life” in a video featuring Trump dancing. Larsson responded saying "I love immigrants, I love criminals, I love trans people, I love abortions, I love queers, I love slutty women, I love contraception, I love welfare, I love socialism, I fucking hate ICE."

== See also ==
- Donald Trump in music
- Use of copyrighted works by the second Trump administration
