= List of Donald Trump rallies (December 2016–2022) =

This is a list of rallies held by Donald Trump, who served as the 45th president of the United States from January 20th, 2017 to January 20th, 2021 after his victory in 2016 presidential election, for the 2018 midterms in support of various politicians, for his unsuccessful campaign in the 2020 presidential election, and for the 2022 midterms in support of various politicians. He was inaugurated as the 47th president of the United States in 2025 after his victory in the 2024 presidential election.

== Thank You Tour (2016) ==
Locations in the United States where President-elect Donald Trump visited in his post-victory Thank You Tour (According to list below).

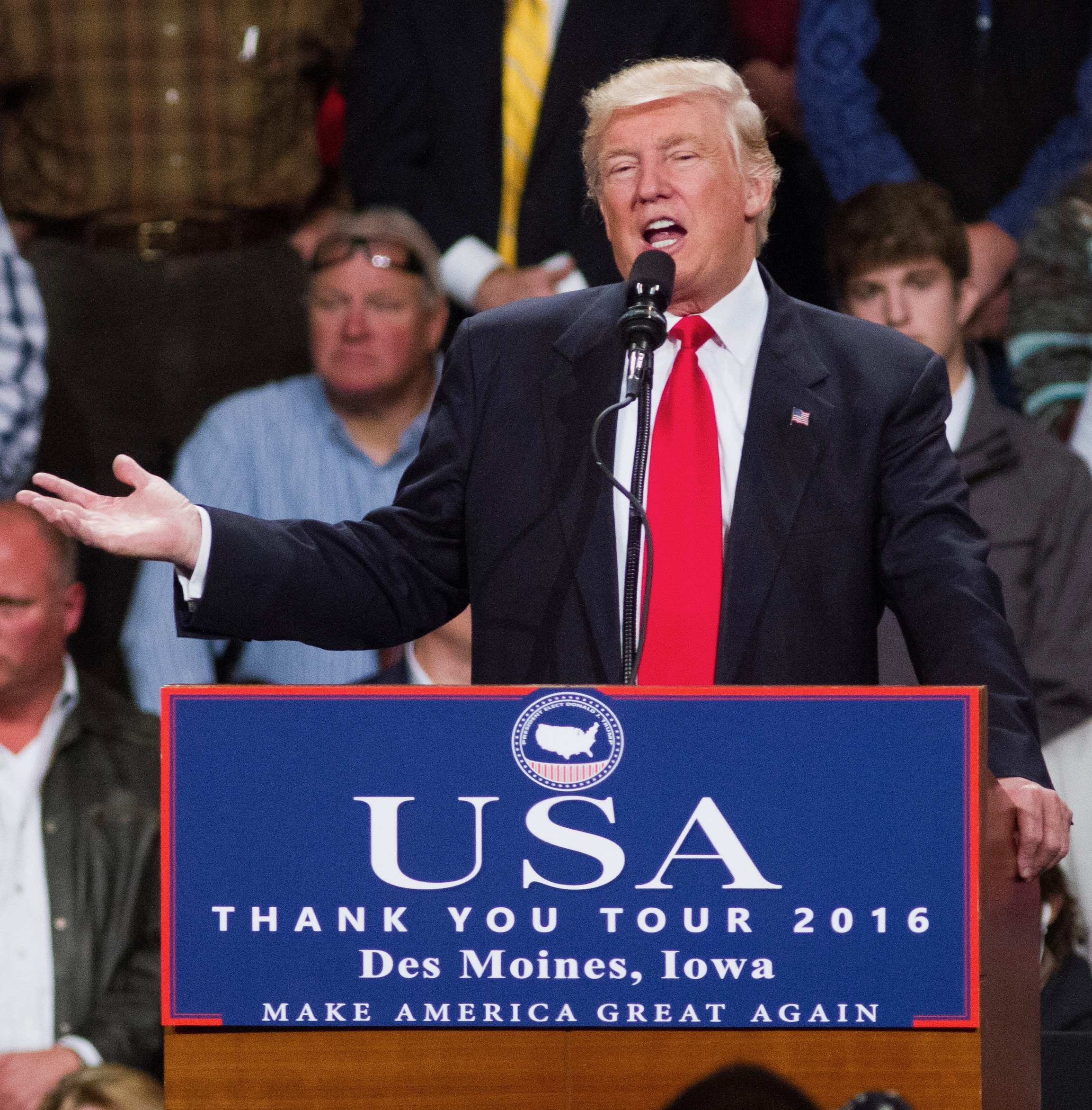
Des Moines, IA. December 8, 2016

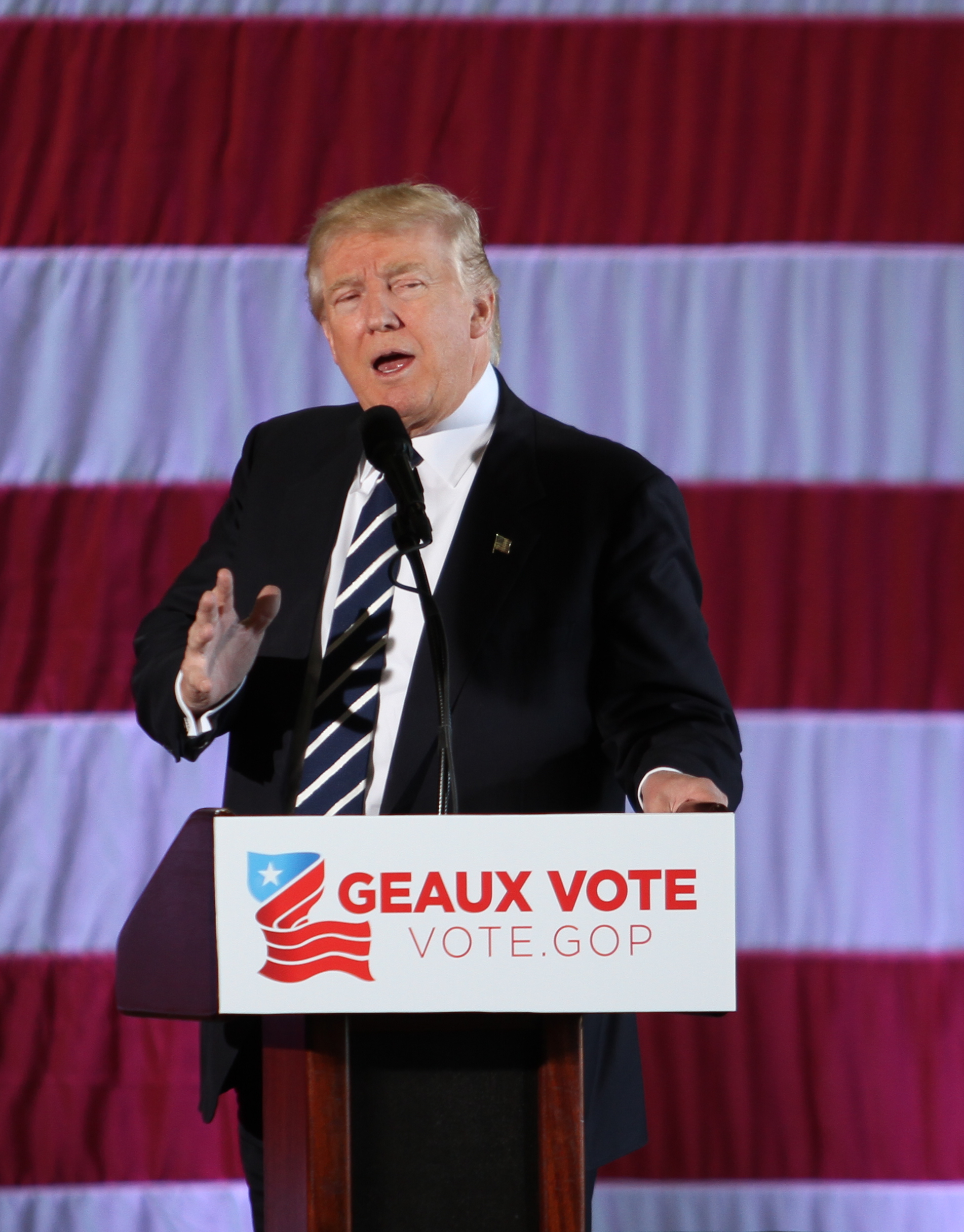
Baton Rouge, LA. December 9, 2016

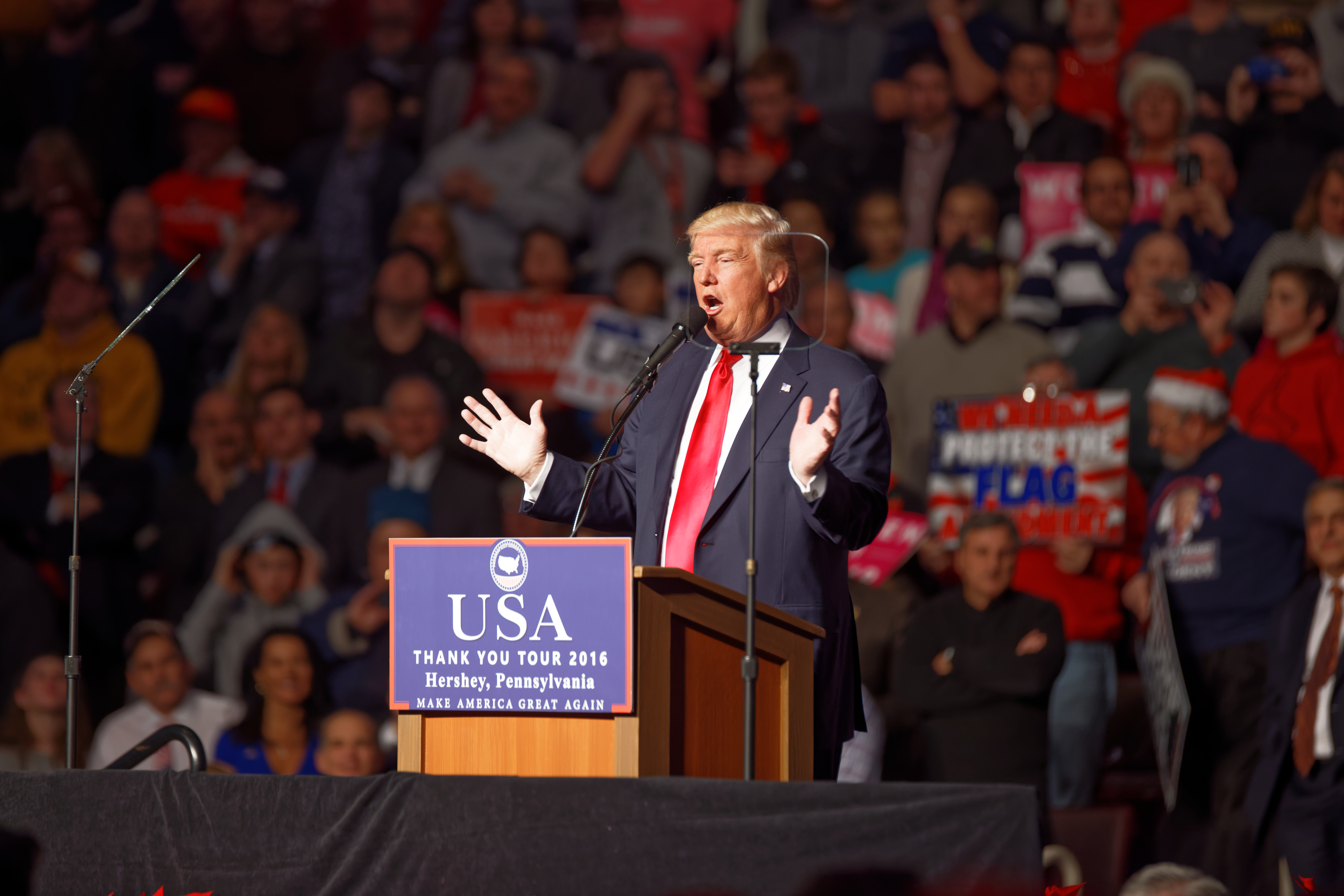
Hershey, PA. December 15, 2016

Victory rallies (December 2016)
Date of rally	City	State	Venue	Other speakers	Ref.
Thursday, December 1, 2016	Cincinnati	OH	U.S. Bank Arena	Josh Mandel, Stephen Miller, Matt Bevin, Mike Pence	
Tuesday, December 6, 2016	Fayetteville	NC	Crown Coliseum	Jimmy Dixon, Nat Robertson, Cherie Berry, Robert Pittenger, Diamond and Silk, Jim Mattis	
Thursday, December 8, 2016	Des Moines	IA	Iowa Events Center	Mike Pence	
Friday, December 9, 2016	Baton Rouge	LA	Dow Chemical Hangar, Baton Rouge Metropolitan Airport	Jeff Landry, Bodi White, Billy Nungesser, Ralph Abraham, Garret Graves, Phil Bryant, David Vitter, Clay Higgins, John Kennedy	
Friday, December 9, 2016	Grand Rapids	MI	DeltaPlex Arena	Ronna McDaniel, Bill Huizenga, Betsy DeVos	
Tuesday, December 13, 2016	West Allis	WI	Wisconsin Exposition Center, Wisconsin State Fair Park	Brad Courtney, David Clarke, Sean Duffy, Ron Johnson, Reince Priebus, Scott Walker, Paul Ryan, Mike Pence	
Thursday, December 15, 2016	Hershey	PA	Giant Center	Mike Pence	
Friday, December 16, 2016	Orlando	FL	Central Florida Fairgrounds	Blaise Ingoglia, Dennis A. Ross, Neal Dunn, Sharon Day, Rick Scott, Mike Pence	
Saturday, December 17, 2016	Mobile	AL	Ladd–Peebles Stadium	Jim Carns, Ed Henry, Perry O. Hooper Jr., Bradley Byrne, Robert Aderholt, Terry Lathan, Tom Parker, Kay Ivey, Luther Strange, Franklin Graham, Stephen Miller, Kellyanne Conway, Jeff Sessions, Hope Hicks	

== Post-2017 inauguration rallies ==
Locations in the United States where President Donald Trump held campaign rallies in his inaugural year, 2017 (according to list below).

Post-inauguration rallies
Date of rally	City	State	Venue	Other speakers	Ref.
Saturday, February 18, 2017	Melbourne	FL	Melbourne Orlando International Airport	Melania Trump	
Wednesday, March 15, 2017	Nashville	TN	Nashville Municipal Auditorium		
Monday, March 20, 2017	Louisville	KY	Kentucky Exposition Center		
Saturday, April 29, 2017	Harrisburg	PA	Pennsylvania Farm Show Complex & Expo Center		
Wednesday, June 21, 2017	Cedar Rapids	IA	U.S. Cellular Center		
Tuesday, July 25, 2017	Youngstown	OH	Covelli Centre	Melania Trump, Eric Trump, Lara Trump	
Thursday, August 3, 2017	Huntington	WV	Big Sandy Superstore Arena	Jim Justice, Hershel W. Williams	
Tuesday, August 22, 2017	Phoenix	AZ	Phoenix Convention Center	Ben Carson, Alveda King, Franklin Graham, Mike Pence	
Friday, September 22, 2017	Huntsville	AL	Von Braun Center	Luther Strange	
Friday, December 8, 2017	Pensacola	FL	Pensacola Bay Center		

== 2018 midterm rallies ==
Locations in the United States where President Donald Trump held campaign rallies during the 2018 midterm cycle (according to list below).

2018 midterm rallies
Date of rally	City	State	Venue	Other speakers	Ref.
Saturday, March 10, 2018	Pittsburgh	PA	Pittsburgh International Airport	Rick Saccone	
Saturday, April 28, 2018	Washington Township	MI	Total Sports Park	Bill Schuette	
Thursday, May 10, 2018	Elkhart	IN	North Side Middle School	Mike Pence, Mike Braun	
Tuesday, May 29, 2018	Nashville	TN	Nashville Municipal Auditorium	Marsha Blackburn	
Wednesday, June 20, 2018	Duluth	MN	AMSOIL Arena	Pete Stauber	
Saturday, June 23, 2018	Las Vegas	NV	Nevada Republican Convention	Dean Heller	
Monday, June 25, 2018	West Columbia	SC	Airport High School	Henry McMaster	
Wednesday, June 27, 2018	Fargo	ND	Scheels Arena	Kevin Cramer	
Thursday July 5, 2018	Great Falls	MT	Four Seasons Arena	Matt Rosendale	
Tuesday, July 31, 2018	Tampa	FL	Florida State Fairgrounds	Ron DeSantis	
Thursday, August 2, 2018	Wilkes-Barre	PA	Mohegan Sun Arena at Casey Plaza	Lou Barletta	
Saturday, August 4, 2018	Lewis Center	OH	Olentangy Orange High School	Troy Balderson, Jim Jordan	
Tuesday, August 21, 2018	Charleston	WV	Charleston Civic Center	Patrick Morrisey, Jim Justice	
Thursday, August 30, 2018	Evansville	IN	Ford Center	Mike Braun	
Thursday, September 6, 2018	Billings	MT	MetraPark Arena	Matt Rosendale	
Thursday, September 20, 2018	Las Vegas	NV	Las Vegas Convention Center	Dean Heller, Adam Laxalt	
Friday, September 21, 2018	Springfield	MO	JQH Arena	Josh Hawley	
Saturday, September 29, 2018	Wheeling	WV	WesBanco Arena	Patrick Morrisey, Jim Justice	
Monday, October 1, 2018	Johnson City	TN	Freedom Hall	Marsha Blackburn, Bill Lee	
Tuesday, October 2, 2018	Southaven	MS	Landers Center	Cindy Hyde-Smith, Roger Wicker	
Thursday, October 4, 2018	Rochester	MN	Mayo Civic Center	Jim Hagedorn, Jason Lewis, Karin Housley	
Saturday, October 6, 2018	Topeka	KS	Kansas Expocentre	Kris Kobach, Steve Watkins	
Tuesday, October 9, 2018	Council Bluffs	IA	Mid-America Center	Kim Reynolds, David Young	
Wednesday, October 10, 2018	Erie	PA	Erie Insurance Arena	Lou Barletta, Mike Kelly	
Friday, October 12, 2018	Lebanon	OH	Warren County Fairgrounds	Jim Renacci, Steve Chabot	
Saturday, October 13, 2018	Richmond	KY	Alumni Coliseum	Andy Barr, Mitch McConnell, Rand Paul	
Thursday, October 18, 2018	Missoula	MT	Missoula International Airport	Matt Rosendale, Steve Daines	
Friday, October 19, 2018	Mesa	AZ	Phoenix–Mesa Gateway Airport	Martha McSally	
Saturday, October 20, 2018	Elko	NV	Elko Regional Airport	Adam Laxalt, Dean Heller	
Monday, October 22, 2018	Houston	TX	Toyota Center	Ted Cruz, Greg Abbott, John Cornyn, Dan Patrick, Lara Trump, Eric Trump, Tilman Fertitta, George Springer, Cal McNair, John Culberson, Gabriel Brenner	
Wednesday, October 24, 2018	Mosinee	WI	Central Wisconsin Airport	Scott Walker, Leah Vukmir, Paul Ryan	
Friday, October 26, 2018	Charlotte	NC	Bojangles' Coliseum	Mark Harris, Ted Budd, Thom Tillis, Richard Childress	
Saturday, October 27, 2018	Murphysboro	IL	Southern Illinois Airport	Mike Bost, Rodney Davis, Randy Hultgren	
Wednesday, October 31, 2018	Fort Myers	FL	Hertz Arena	Ron DeSantis, Rick Scott	
Thursday, November 1, 2018	Columbia	MO	Columbia Regional Airport	Josh Hawley	
Friday, November 2, 2018	Huntington	WV	Tri-State Airport	Patrick Morrisey, Carol Miller	
Friday, November 2, 2018	Indianapolis	IN	Southport High School	Mike Pence, Mike Braun, Bobby Knight	
Saturday, November 3, 2018	Belgrade	MT	Bozeman Yellowstone International Airport	Matt Rosendale, Greg Gianforte	
Saturday, November 3, 2018	Pensacola	FL	Pensacola International Airport	Mike Pence, Ron DeSantis, Rick Scott	
Sunday, November 4, 2018	Macon	GA	Middle Georgia Regional Airport	Brian Kemp, Nathan Deal, Geoff Duncan, Sonny Perdue	
Sunday, November 4, 2018	Chattanooga	TN	McKenzie Arena	Mike Pence, Lee Greenwood, Marsha Blackburn	
Monday, November 5, 2018	Cleveland	OH	I-X Center	Jim Jordan, Ivanka Trump, Jim Renacci, Mike DeWine	
Monday, November 5, 2018	Fort Wayne	IN	Allen County War Memorial Coliseum	Ivanka Trump, Kellyanne Conway, Sarah Sanders, Mike Braun	
Monday, November 5, 2018	Cape Girardeau	MO	Show Me Center	Josh Hawley, Sean Hannity, Jeanine Pirro, Rush Limbaugh, Lee Greenwood, Ivanka Trump, Kellyanne Conway, Sarah Sanders	
Monday, November 26, 2018	Tupelo	MS	Tupelo Regional Airport	Cindy Hyde-Smith	
Monday, November 26, 2018	Biloxi	MS	Mississippi Coast Coliseum	Mike Pence, Phil Bryant, Cindy Hyde-Smith	

== 2020 presidential campaign ==
=== Pre-2020 campaign rallies ===
Locations in the United States where President Donald Trump held campaign rallies during the pre-2020 campaign and primary elections (according to list below).

Date of rally	City	State	Venue	Other speakers	Ref.
Monday, February 11, 2019	El Paso	TX	El Paso County Coliseum	Brad Parscale, John Cornyn, Lance Berkman, Ted Cruz, Donald Trump Jr.	
Thursday, March 28, 2019	Grand Rapids	MI	Van Andel Arena	Donald Trump Jr., Brad Parscale	
Saturday, April 27, 2019	Green Bay	WI	Resch Center	Mike Gallagher, Diamond and Silk, Sean Duffy, Donald Trump Jr., Sarah Sanders	
Wednesday, May 8, 2019	Panama City Beach	FL	Aaron Bessant Park Amphitheater	Ron DeSantis, Marco Rubio	
Monday, May 20, 2019	Montoursville	PA	Williamsport Regional Airport	Fred Keller	

=== Primary rallies (June 2019–March 2020) ===
Campaign rallies were temporarily suspended in light of the coronavirus pandemic.

Date of rally	City	State	Venue	Other speakers	Ref.
Tuesday, June 18, 2019	Orlando	FL	Amway Center	Donald Trump Jr., Mike Pence, Melania Trump, Karen Pence, Lara Trump, Sarah Huckabee Sanders	
Wednesday, July 17, 2019	Greenville	NC	Williams Arena	Mike Pence, Greg Murphy, Dan Bishop	
Thursday, August 1, 2019	Cincinnati	OH	U.S. Bank Arena	Mike Pence, Donald Trump Jr.	
Thursday, August 15, 2019	Manchester	NH	SNHU Arena	Brad Parscale	
Monday, September 9, 2019	Fayetteville	NC	Crown Expo Center	Dan Bishop, Greg Murphy	
Monday, September 16, 2019	Rio Rancho	NM	Santa Ana Star Center	Brad Parscale	
Sunday, September 22, 2019	Houston	TX	NRG Stadium	Ted Cruz, John Cornyn	
Thursday, October 10, 2019	Minneapolis	MN	Target Center	Mike Pence, Eric Trump	
Friday, October 11, 2019	Lake Charles	LA	James E. Sudduth Coliseum	Ralph Abraham, Eddie Rispone	
Thursday, October 17, 2019	Dallas	TX	American Airlines Center		
Friday, November 1, 2019	Tupelo	MS	BancorpSouth Arena	Tate Reeves	
Monday, November 4, 2019	Lexington	KY	Rupp Arena	Matt Bevin	
Wednesday, November 6, 2019	Monroe	LA	Monroe Civic Center	Eddie Rispone, Willie Robertson	
Thursday, November 14, 2019	Bossier City	LA	CenturyLink Center	Eddie Rispone	
Tuesday, November 26, 2019	Sunrise	FL	BB&T Center	Mike Pence	
Tuesday, December 10, 2019	Hershey	PA	Giant Center	Mike Pence	
Wednesday, December 18, 2019	Battle Creek	MI	Kellogg Arena	John E. James, Mike Pence	
Friday, January 3, 2020	Miami	FL	El Rey Jesús		
Thursday, January 9, 2020	Toledo	OH	Huntington Center	Mike Pence	
Tuesday, January 14, 2020	Milwaukee	WI	UW–Milwaukee Panther Arena	Mike Pence	
Tuesday, January 28, 2020	Wildwood	NJ	Wildwoods Convention Center	Jeff Van Drew, Kellyanne Conway	
Thursday, January 30, 2020	Des Moines	IA	Knapp Center	Mike Pence	
Monday, February 10, 2020	Manchester	NH	SNHU Arena	Donald Trump Jr., Mike Pence	
Wednesday, February 19, 2020	Phoenix	AZ	Arizona Veterans Memorial Coliseum	Martha McSally, Donald Trump Jr.	
Thursday, February 20, 2020	Colorado Springs	CO	Broadmoor World Arena	Cory Gardner, Mike Pence, Dana White	
Friday, February 21, 2020	Las Vegas	NV	Las Vegas Convention Center	Mike Pence	
Friday, February 28, 2020	North Charleston	SC	North Charleston Coliseum & Performing Arts Center	Lindsey Graham, Tim Scott	
Monday, March 2, 2020	Charlotte	NC	Bojangles' Coliseum	Lara Trump, Eric Trump	

=== General Election rallies (June 2020–November 2020) ===
Locations in the United States where President Donald Trump visited in his General Election rallies (According to list below).

In light of the COVID-19 pandemic, Trump suspended in-person campaign rallies from March 3 through June 19, replacing them with 'tele-rallies'. COVID-19 diagnoses peaked at about 31,000 new cases per day in April. Trump resumed campaign rallies on June 20, at a time when about 25,000 new cases were being diagnosed per day and the rate of new cases was increasing. The daily rate of new COVID-19 diagnoses reached 85,000 cases by Election Day.

Date of rally	City	State	Venue	Other speakers	Ref.
Saturday, June 20, 2020	Tulsa	OK	BOK Center	Lara Trump, Eric Trump, Mike Pence, Diamond and Silk, Kimberly Guilfoyle, T. W. Shannon	
Tuesday, June 23, 2020	Phoenix	AZ	Dream City Church	Donald Trump Jr., Kimberly Guilfoyle, Charlie Kirk	
Monday, August 17, 2020	Mankato	MN	Mankato Regional Airport		
Monday, August 17, 2020	Oshkosh	WI	Wittman Regional Airport		
Tuesday, August 18, 2020	Yuma	AZ	Yuma International Airport		
Thursday, August 20, 2020	Old Forge	PA	Mariotti Building Products		
Friday, August 28, 2020	Londonderry	NH	Manchester-Boston Regional Airport		
Thursday, September 3, 2020	Latrobe	PA	Arnold Palmer Regional Airport	Sean Parnell	
Tuesday, September 8, 2020	Winston-Salem	NC	Smith Reynolds Airport		
Thursday, September 10, 2020	Freeland	MI	MBS International Airport	John E. James	
Saturday, September 12, 2020	Minden	NV	Minden–Tahoe Airport		
Sunday, September 13, 2020	Henderson	NV	Xtreme Manufacturing	Kimberly Guilfoyle	
Monday, September 14, 2020	Harrison	MI	Bumpers Landing Boat Club	Kid Rock, Donald Trump Jr, and Kimberly Guilfoyle	
Thursday, September 17, 2020	Mosinee	WI	Central Wisconsin Airport		
Friday, September 18, 2020	Bemidji	MN	Bemidji Regional Airport		
Saturday, September 19, 2020	Fayetteville	NC	Fayetteville Regional Airport		
Monday, September 21, 2020	Vandalia	OH	Dayton International Airport		
Monday, September 21, 2020	Swanton	OH	Toledo Express Airport		
Tuesday, September 22, 2020	Moon Township	PA	Pittsburgh International Airport	Sean Parnell, Rose Tennent	
Thursday, September 24, 2020	Jacksonville	FL	Cecil Airport	Matt Gaetz, Mike Waltz, Ron DeSantis	
Friday, September 25, 2020	Newport News	VA	Newport News/Williamsburg International Airport	Mike Pence	
Saturday, September 26, 2020	Middletown	PA	Harrisburg International Airport		
Wednesday, September 30, 2020	Duluth	MN	Duluth International Airport		
Monday, October 12, 2020	Sanford	FL	Orlando Sanford International Airport	Kimberly Guilfoyle, Ron DeSantis	
Tuesday, October 13, 2020	Johnstown	PA	John Murtha Johnstown-Cambria County Airport		
Wednesday, October 14, 2020	Des Moines	IA	Des Moines International Airport	Kim Reynolds	
Thursday, October 15, 2020	Greenville	NC	Pitt-Greenville Airport		
Friday, October 16, 2020	Ocala	FL	Ocala International Airport	Ron DeSantis	
Friday, October 16, 2020	Macon	GA	Middle Georgia Regional Airport	David Perdue	
Saturday, October 17, 2020	Muskegon	MI	Muskegon County Airport	Ted Nugent, John E. James	
Saturday, October 17, 2020	Janesville	WI	Southern Wisconsin Regional Airport		
Sunday, October 18, 2020	Carson City	NV	Carson City Airport		
Monday, October 19, 2020	Prescott	AZ	Prescott Regional Airport	Martha McSally, Doug Ducey	
Monday, October 19, 2020	Tucson	AZ	Tucson International Airport	Doug Ducey	
Tuesday, October 20, 2020	Erie	PA	Erie International Airport		
Wednesday, October 21, 2020	Gastonia	NC	Gastonia Municipal Airport		
Friday, October 23, 2020	The Villages	FL	The Villages Polo Club	Pam Bondi, Ron DeSantis, Chris Jessee (Pastor of Metrolife Church), Kat Cammack, Daniel Webster, Mike Waltz	
Friday, October 23, 2020	Pensacola	FL	Pensacola International Airport	Matt Gaetz, Ron DeSantis	
Saturday, October 24, 2020	Lumberton	NC	Robeson County Fairgrounds		
Saturday, October 24, 2020	Circleville	OH	Pickaway Agriculture and Event Center		
Saturday, October 24, 2020	Waukesha	WI	Waukesha County Airport		
Sunday, October 25, 2020	Manchester	NH	Manchester-Boston Regional Airport		
Monday, October 26, 2020	Allentown	PA	HoverTech International		
Monday, October 26, 2020	Lititz	PA	Lancaster Airport		
Monday, October 26, 2020	Martinsburg	PA	Altoona–Blair County Airport		
Tuesday, October 27, 2020	Lansing	MI	Capital Region International Airport	Ronna McDaniel, Paul Junge, Ted Nugent, John James	
Tuesday, October 27, 2020	West Salem	WI	La Crosse Fairgrounds Speedway		
Tuesday, October 27, 2020	Omaha	NE	Eppley Airfield	David Young, Kristi Noem, Pete Ricketts, Todd Ricketts, Don Bacon, Deb Fischer	
Wednesday, October 28, 2020	Bullhead City	AZ	Laughlin/Bullhead International Airport	Nelk, Charlie Kirk, Kelli Ward, Michael J. McDonald, Adam Laxalt, Daniel Rodimer	
Wednesday, October 28, 2020	Goodyear	AZ	Phoenix Goodyear Airport	Martha McSally, Rand Paul, Mike Lee, Kevin McCarthy, Nigel Farage	
Thursday, October 29, 2020	Tampa	FL	Raymond James Stadium	Melania Trump, Jeanette Nuñez, Ron DeSantis, Ashley Moody, Joe Gruters, Scott Franklin, Anna Paulina Luna, Gus Bilirakis, Mike Waltz, Greg Steube	
Friday, October 30, 2020	Waterford Township	MI	Oakland County International Airport	Ben Carson, Laura Ingraham	
Friday, October 30, 2020	Green Bay	WI	Green Bay–Austin Straubel International Airport		
Friday, October 30, 2020	Rochester	MN	Rochester International Airport		
Saturday, October 31, 2020	Newtown	PA	Keith House		
Saturday, October 31, 2020	Reading	PA	Reading Regional Airport		
Saturday, October 31, 2020	Butler	PA	Pittsburgh-Butler Regional Airport	Rose Tennent, Mike Kelly, Sean Parnell, Lou Holtz	
Saturday, October 31, 2020	Montoursville	PA	Williamsport Regional Airport		
Sunday, November 1, 2020	Washington	MI	Michigan Stars Sports Center	Ivanka Trump	
Sunday, November 1, 2020	Dubuque	IA	Dubuque Regional Airport	Kim Reynolds, Chuck Grassley, Joni Ernst	
Sunday, November 1, 2020	Hickory	NC	Hickory Regional Airport		
Sunday, November 1, 2020	Rome	GA	Richard B. Russell Airport	Sonny Perdue, David Perdue	
Sunday, November 1, 2020	Opa-locka	FL	Miami-Opa Locka Executive Airport	Kimberly Guilfoyle, Rick Scott, Marco Rubio, Ron DeSantis, Robert Marrero, Jeanette Nunez, Ashley Moody	
Monday, November 2, 2020	Fayetteville	NC	Fayetteville Regional Airport		
Monday, November 2, 2020	Pittston Township	PA	Wilkes-Barre Scranton International Airport		
Monday, November 2, 2020	Traverse City	MI	Cherry Capital Airport	Mike Pence, John E. James	
Monday, November 2, 2020	Kenosha	WI	Kenosha Regional Airport	Ivanka Trump, Jared Kushner, Eric Trump, Lara Trump, Donald Trump Jr., Kimberly Guilfoyle	
Monday, November 2, 2020	Grand Rapids	MI	Gerald R. Ford International Airport	Mike Pence, Lil Pump, Justin Caporale	

== Post-2020 election rallies (December 2020–January 2021) ==
Post-election rallies
Date of rally	City	State	Venue	Other speakers	Ref.
Saturday, December 5, 2020	Valdosta	GA	Valdosta Regional Airport	David Perdue, Kelly Loeffler, Vernon Jones, Burt Jones (pledge reciter), Gary Black (anthem singer), Bubba McDonald	
Monday, January 4, 2021	Dalton	GA	Dalton Municipal Airport	Kelly Loeffler, Marjorie Taylor Greene, Ivanka Trump, Donald Trump Jr., Kimberly Guilfoyle	
Wednesday, January 6, 2021	Washington	DC	The Ellipse	Rudy Giuliani, Mo Brooks, Madison Cawthorn, John C. Eastman, Eric Trump, Lara Trump, Kimberly Guilfoyle, Donald Trump Jr., Ken Paxton	

== 2022 midterm rallies (June 2021–November 2022) ==
Locations in the United States where former President Donald Trump held campaign rallies during the 2022 midterm cycle (according to list below).
Locations in Alaska where former President Donald Trump has visited.

Date of rally	City	State	Venue	Other speakers	Ref.
Saturday, June 26, 2021	Wellington	OH	Lorain County Fairgrounds	Max Miller, Marjorie Taylor Greene, Mike Carey, Jim Jordan	
Saturday, July 3, 2021	Sarasota	FL	Sarasota Fairgrounds	Joe Gruters, Christian Ziegler	
Saturday, August 21, 2021	Cullman	AL	York Family Farms	John Wahl, Todd Starnes, Garlan Gudger, Robert Aderholt, Andrew Sorrell, Steve Marshall, Will Ainsworth, Tommy Tuberville, Mo Brooks	
Saturday, September 25, 2021	Perry	GA	Georgia National Fairgrounds & Agriculture Center	Herschel Walker, Jody Hice, Burt Jones, Marjorie Taylor Greene	
Saturday, October 9, 2021	Des Moines	IA	Iowa State Fairgrounds	Chuck Grassley, Kim Reynolds, Ashley Hinson, Mariannette Miller-Meeks	
Saturday, January 15, 2022	Florence	AZ	Country Thunder Festival Grounds	Kari Lake, Mark Finchem, Paul Gosar, Andy Biggs, Debbie Lesko, Kelli Ward, Alveda King, Boris Epshteyn, Mike Lindell	
Saturday, January 29, 2022	Conroe	TX	Montgomery County Fairgrounds	Greg Abbott, Dan Patrick, Ken Paxton, Sid Miller, Dawn Buckingham, Mark Keough, Connie Kacir, Matt Rinaldi, Donald Trump Jr.	
Saturday, March 12, 2022	Florence	SC	Florence Regional Airport	Henry McMaster, Russell Fry, Katie Arrington, Drew McKissick, Brandon Judd, Lou Holtz, Graham Allen	
Saturday, March 26, 2022	Commerce	GA	Banks County Dragway	David Perdue, Burt Jones, Herschel Walker, Jody Hice, Marjorie Taylor Greene, Andrew Clyde, Vernon Jones, John Gordon, Patrick Witt, Tom Homan, Todd Starnes	
Saturday, April 2, 2022	Washington Township	MI	Michigan Stars Sports Center	Matthew DePerno, Kristina Karamo, Lisa McClain, John Gibbs	
Saturday, April 9, 2022	Selma	NC	The Farm at 95	Ted Budd, Madison Cawthorn, Bo Hines, Mark Robinson, Dan Bishop, Greg Murphy	
Saturday, April 23, 2022	Delaware	OH	Delaware County Fairgrounds	JD Vance, Mike Carey, Max Miller, Madison Gesiotto Gilbert	
Sunday, May 1, 2022 (Note: Rally originally scheduled for April 29, but delayed due to the severe weather.)	Greenwood	NE	Nebraska Raceway Park	Charles Herbster, Kellyanne Conway, David Bossie, Mike Lindell, Donald Trump Jr.	
Friday, May 6, 2022	Greensburg	PA	Westmoreland Fairgrounds	Mehmet Oz, JD Vance, John Joyce, Mike Kelly, Jim Bognet, Alex Mooney, Dinesh D'Souza, Mike Lindell, Stacy Garrity	
Saturday, May 28, 2022	Casper	WY	Ford Wyoming Center	Harriet Hageman, Frank Eathorne, Cheri Steinmetz, Chip Neiman, John Bear, Marti Halverson	
Saturday, June 18, 2022	Southaven	MS	Landers Center	Kimberly Guilfoyle, Donald Trump Jr.	
Saturday, June 25, 2022	Mendon	IL	Adams County Fairgrounds	Mary Miller	
Saturday, July 9, 2022	Anchorage	AK	Alaska Airlines Center	Mike Lindell, Sarah Palin, Kelly Tshibaka	
Friday, July 22, 2022 (Note: Rally originally scheduled for July 16, but delayed due to the death of Trump's first wife, Ivana.)	Prescott Valley	AZ	Findlay Toyota Center	Kari Lake, Blake Masters, Mark Finchem, Abraham Hamadeh, Mark Lamb, Kelli Ward, Mike Lindell	
Friday, August 5, 2022	Waukesha	WI	Waukesha County Fairgrounds	Tim Michels, Derrick Van Orden, Janel Brandtjen, Adam Steen	
Saturday, September 3, 2022	Wilkes-Barre	PA	Mohegan Sun Arena at Casey Plaza	Mehmet Oz, Doug Mastriano, Jim Bognet, Marjorie Taylor Greene	
Saturday, September 17, 2022	Youngstown	OH	Covelli Centre	JD Vance, Jim Jordan, Bill Johnson, Max Miller, Madison Gesiotto Gilbert, J. R. Majewski, Marjorie Taylor Greene	
Friday, September 23, 2022	Wilmington	NC	Aero Center	Ted Budd, Mark Robinson, David Rouzer, Bo Hines, Michael Whatley	
Saturday, October 1, 2022	Warren	MI	Macomb Sports and Expo Center	Tudor Dixon, Matthew DePerno, Kristina Karamo, John James, Marjorie Taylor Greene	
Saturday, October 8, 2022	Minden	NV	Minden–Tahoe Airport	Joe Lombardo, Adam Laxalt, Jim Marchant, Sigal Chattah, Michele Fiore, Tommy Tuberville; Mark Amodei, Stavros Anthony, Andy Matthews, Sam Peters; Michael McDonald, Jesse Law, Richard Grenell, Kash Patel.	
Sunday, October 9, 2022	Mesa	AZ	Legacy Sports Park	Kari Lake, Blake Masters, Mark Finchem, Abraham Hamadeh, Andy Biggs, Debbie Lesko, Marjorie Taylor Greene, Richard Grenell, Kash Patel	
Saturday, October 22, 2022	Robstown	TX	Richard M. Borchard Regional Fairgrounds	Dan Patrick, Ken Paxton, Michael Cloud, Tom Homan, Brandon Judd	
Thursday, November 3, 2022	Sioux City	IA	Sioux Gateway Airport	Kim Reynolds, Chuck Grassley, Terry Branstad, Matt Whitaker, Jeff Kaufmann, Dan Lederman, Brenna Bird	
Saturday, November 5, 2022	Latrobe	PA	Arnold Palmer Regional Airport	Doug Mastriano, Mehmet Oz, Mike Kelly, Guy Reschenthaler, John Joyce, Kenneth Copeland	
Sunday, November 6, 2022	Miami	FL	Miami-Dade County Fair & Exposition	Marco Rubio, Rick Scott, Wilton Simpson, Mario Diaz-Balart, Vern Buchanan, Matt Gaetz, Mike Waltz, Kat Cammack, Byron Donalds, Carlos A. Gimenez, Esteban Bovo, Joe Gruters, Cory Mills, Anna Paulina Luna	
Monday, November 7, 2022	Dayton	OH	Wright Bros. Aero, Inc. at Dayton International Airport	JD Vance, Jim Jordan, Mike Turner, Warren Davidson, Mike Carey, Max Miller, J. R. Majewski, Mike DeWine	

== See also ==
- List of rallies for the 2016 Donald Trump presidential campaign, rallies for Trump's first successful campaign
- List of rallies for the 2024 Donald Trump presidential campaign, rallies for Trump's second successful campaign
- List of Donald Trump rallies (2025–present)
