= Scott LoBaido =

American artist

- Born: April 6, 1965 (age 61); Staten Island, New York
- Education: New Dorp High School
- Occupation: Painter

Scott LoBaido (born April 6, 1965) is an American artist known for patriotic, US Flag, and political themed paintings and sculptures. LoBaido is currently based out of Staten Island, New York. He is most well known for his paintings of flags.

== Early life ==
Scott LoBaido was born St. Vincent’s Hospital in the West Brighton neighborhood in Staten Island. LoBaido attended New Dorp High School.

== Tours ==
=== Flags Across America ===
In 2006, LoBaido embarked on his Flag Across America tour. He traveled across United States in a 1989 Chevy Suburban, painting a US flag on a rooftop in each of the 50 states. In order to make the tour possible, he relied on donations of paint, food, and money. During September ABC news named him person of the week.

=== Second Flags Across America ===
In 2015, Scott LoBaido conducted a second Flags Across America tour. This tour he painted a US Flag on an American Legion or a VFW post in every state. The tour began on February 21, 2015, at American Legion Post 202 in Fayetteville, North Carolina. In 2016 during the 117th National Convention of Veterans of Foreign Wars of the United States, LoBaido was presented with VFW Americanism Award in recognition of the VFWs and American Legions that were painting in 2015.

== Select works ==
In 2010, LoBaido and assistants painted what was then the largest mural on the roof of Lamons Gasket Company near Hobby Airport. He began Flag Day June 14 and completed it on Independence Day July 4. The mural was 150,000 square feet, it used 900 gallons of paint and cost nearly $50,000. LoBaido called the painting a birthday gift to America. In 2015 Scott LoBaido built memorial tributes to the 24 people that died on Staten Island from Hurricane Sandy. LoBaido then appeared on Steve Harvey's Veterans Day episode and presented Harvey with a painting of Harvey with a US Flag background. In 2018 LoBaido sculpted "Breaking Through Barriers". "Breaking Through Barriers" is a public arts project that promotes autism awareness.

== Politically inspired works ==
LoBaido has been a vocal supporter of the 45th and 47th president of the United States, Donald Trump. In 2016 LoBaido's painting of Donald Trump was seen held by Eric Trump LoBaido sculpted a 12-foot-tall letter T for Sam Pirrozola's lawn, a Staten Islander who is now assemblyman. The T, which was in support of Donald Trump's 2016 presidential campaign, was torched and investigated by the New York City Fire Department.

LoBaido is also known to participate in protests, once throwing pizzas at New York City Hall to protest restrictions on coal and wood-fire ovens. He was arrested twice in 2025 for blocking Columbus Circle in a protest of congestion pricing and for criminal tampering with speed cameras on Staten Island.

On August 4, 2026, LoBaido collapsed after jeering and screaming profanities at Mayor Zohran Mamdani during his appearance at a New York Police Department community outreach event in Staten Island. He went into cardiac arrest and was revived by first responders.
