= Jentezen Franklin =

American evangelical pastor, author and televangelist

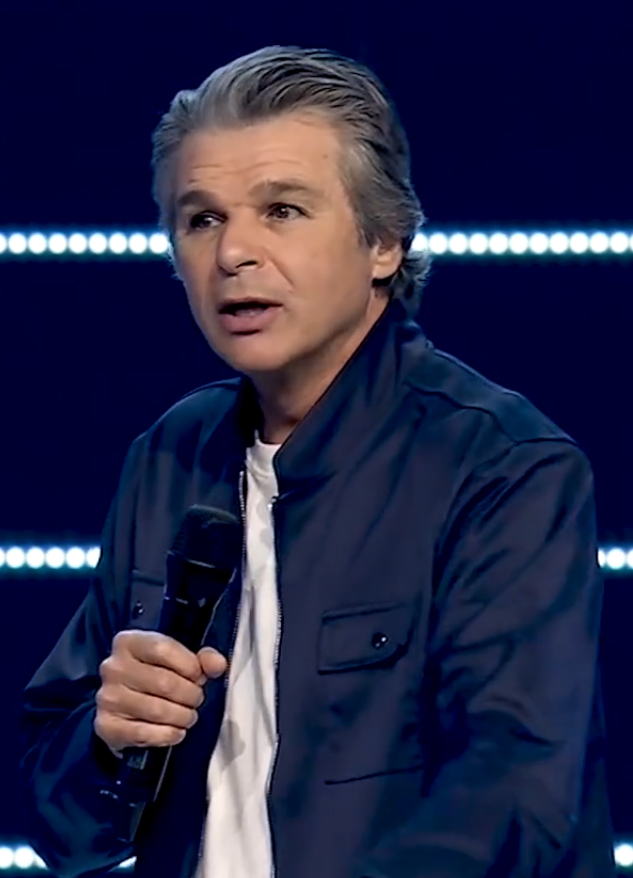
- Franklin in 2019
- Born: Wilson, North Carolina, U.S.
- Occupations: Pastor; Author; Saxophonist
- Spouse: Cherise Franklin (m. 1987)
- Children: 5
- Website: JentezenFranklin.org

Jentezen Franklin is an American evangelical pastor, author, and televangelist. He is the senior pastor of Free Chapel, a multi-site church based in Gainesville, Georgia, and author of Right People, Right Place, Right Plan; Fasting; Fear Fighters and The Spirit of Python. Franklin is also known for his support of Israel, including humanitarian initiatives and advocacy for Christian‑Jewish cooperation.

== Ministry ==
On his way to a musical career as a saxophone player Franklin became an evangelist. After Roy Wellborn, senior pastor of Free Chapel, died in 1989, Franklin was installed as pastor of Free Chapel. At the time, Free Chapel was a small congregation of 300 people. In 2004 the church moved to a new location which had a 3,000-seat auditorium. As of 2023, Free Chapel is a megachurch with multiple campuses across the Southern United States. The Jerusalem Post described the ministry as being "focused on prayer and spiritual renewal".

Jentezen has written over a dozen books. His close friend, pastor Tommy Tenney, wrote the foreword Jentezen's 2007 best seller Fasting: Opening the door to a deeper, more intimate, more powerful relationship with God.

In 2025, Franklin was included in The Jerusalem Post's list of Top 10 Christian Zionists, and in the Israel Allies Foundation's Top 50 Christian Allies for his work fighting antisemitism and leadership in Christian humanitarian relief efforts, benefiting Israeli communities.

== Personal life ==
Franklin and his wife Cherise married in September 1987. They have children and grandchildren.

== Published works ==
- Fasting: (Volume I) Private Discipline That Brings Public Reward (2004)
- Fasting: (Volume II) Opening A Door To God's Promises (2005)
- Take Hold Of Your Dreams
- The Amazing Discernment of Women: Learning to Understand Your Spiritual Intuition And God's Plan for It (2006)
- Right People, Right Place, Right Plan (2007)
- Right People, Right Place, Right Plan Devotional: 30 Days of Discerning the Voice of God (2008)
- Fasting: Opening the door to a deeper, more intimate, more powerful relationship with God (2008)
- Fasting Journal: Your Personal 21-Day Guide to a Successful Fast (2008)
- Believe That You Can (2008)
- Fasting Study Guide: 5-Week Interactive Study Resource (2009)
- Fear Fighters: How to Live with Confidence in a World Driven by Fear (2009)
- Right People Right Place Right Plan (2011)
- The Fasting Edge: Recover your passion. Recapture your dream. Restore your joy. (2011)
- Fasting Student Edition: Go Deeper and Further with God Than Ever Before (2012)
- The Spirit of Python: Exposing Satan's Plan to Squeeze the Life Out of You (2013)
- Love Like You’ve Never Been Hurt (2018)
- Acres of Diamonds: Discovering God’s Best Right Where You Are (2020)

== See also ==
- Fasting
