= National Border Patrol Council =

Union for the United States Border Patrol

- Founded: 1967; 59 years ago
- Headquarters: Washington, D.C.
- Location: United States
- Members: over 18,000
- Key people: Paul Perez, President; Hector M. Garza, Vice President and Spokesperson, Art Del Cueto, Vice President and Spokesperson
- Affiliations: AFL–CIO
- Website: bpunion.org

The National Border Patrol Council (NBPC) is a labor union established in 1967 that represents agents and support staff on the United States Border Patrol. It is an affiliate of the American Federation of Government Employees, and through that larger organization is a member of the AFL–CIO.

== History ==
During the 2016 presidential election, the group made its first presidential endorsement in October 2016 for Republican nominee Donald Trump, who later was elected the 45th president of the United States. The NBPC again supported Donald Trump during his re-election campaign in 2020.

In February 2024, the council endorsed a bipartisan border security bill in the U.S. Senate intended to sharply reduce incentives for migrants to attempt crossings over the Mexico–United States border, describing it as "not perfect" but "far better than the status quo". The bill was later blocked by Republican members of the senate at the request of former President Donald Trump.
