= Gastonia Municipal Airport =

- IATA: none; ICAO: KAKH; FAA LID: AKH

Summary
- Airport type: Public
- Owner: City of Gastonia
- Serves: Gastonia, North Carolina
- Elevation AMSL: 798 ft (243 m)
- Coordinates: 35°12′10″N 081°08′59″W
- Website: gastonianc.gov/municipal-airport

Map
- Location of airport in North Carolina

Runways
Direction	Length		Surface
Direction	ft	m	Surface
3/21	3,769	1,149	Asphalt

Statistics (2022)
- Aircraft operations (year ending 7/4/2022): 9,910
- Based aircraft: 45
- Source: Federal Aviation Administration

Gastonia Municipal Airport (ICAO: KAKH, FAA LID: AKH) is a city-owned, public-use airport located four nautical miles (5 mi, 7 km) south of the central business district of Gastonia, a city in Gaston County, North Carolina, United States. It is included in the National Plan of Integrated Airport Systems for 2011–2015, which categorized it as a general aviation facility.

This airport is assigned a three-letter location identifier of AKH by the Federal Aviation Administration, but it does not have an International Air Transport Association (IATA) airport code (the IATA assigned AKH to Prince Sultan Air Base in Al Kharj, Saudi Arabia).

== Facilities and aircraft ==
Gastonia Municipal Airport covers an area of 280 acres (113 ha) at an elevation of 798 feet (243 m) above mean sea level. It has one runway designated 3/21 with an asphalt surface measuring 3,769 by 100 feet (1,149 x 30 m).

For the 12-month period ending July 4, 2022, the airport had 9,910 aircraft operations, an average of 27 per day: 99% general aviation, and <1% military. At that time there were 45 aircraft based at this airport: 39 single-engine, 4 multi-engine, 1 helicopter, and 1 jet.

== See also ==
- List of airports in North Carolina
