= Margaret Ledwith =

British academic and author

Margaret Lewdith
- Occupations: Emeritus Professor; Academic; Author

Academic work
- Institutions: University of Cumbria
- Main interests: Community Development; Social Justice
- Notable works: Community Development in Action; Community Development: A Critical and Radical Approach

Margaret Ledwith is a British academic. She is an Emerita Professor at the University of Cumbria and the author of several books including Community Development in Action: Putting Freire into Practice and Community Development: A Critical and Radical Approach.

== Biography ==
Lewdith is part of the Institute of Health at the University of Cumbria as an Emeritus Professor in Community Development and Social Justice. Ledwith has authored a number of books, including on subjects such as Paulo Freire, community development, and participatory theory.

In 2015, Ledwith published the book Community Development in Action: Putting Friere into Practice for practitioners to understand and use the theories of Freire. The book was generally well received by critics and academics. Academic Gabrielle Hesk, from the University of Salford, said that Ledwith "demonstrates inclusivity" and summarises her review saying the book is "refreshingly accessible" providing a "practical and comprehensive resource for social work students, practitioners and community activists". In a review for the academic journal Educational Action Research, Lew Allen said it is an "important book". R. Alan Wright, in a review for the academic journal Community Development Journal, writes that "readers will find this manual helpful in their social justice endeavours" and concludes that Ledwith is "achieves her goal" in making the work of Friere accessible and relevant to community development.

== Works ==
- Community Development: A Critical Approach (2011) BASW/Policy Press ISBN 978-1847426468
- Community Development in Action: Putting Freire into Practice (2015) Policy Press ISBN 978-1847428752
- Community Development: A Critical and Radical Approach (2020) Policy Press ISBN 978-1447348177
- Participatory Practice: Community-based Action for Transformative Change (2022) Policy Press ISBN 978-1447360087
