= Playing the Whore =

2014 non-fiction book

Playing the Whore: The Work of Sex Work
- Front cover
- Author: Melissa Gira Grant
- Subject: Sex work
- Publisher: Verso Books
- Publication date: March 2014
- Pages: 144
- ISBN: 9781781683231

Playing the Whore: The Work of Sex Work is a 2014 book by Melissa Gira Grant about the politics of sex work. The author—a journalist and former sex worker—views sex work as labor and analyzes public narratives about what a prostitute is. Grant identifies systemic economic issues relating to sex work while dissenting with anti–sex-work feminists and organizations which aim to "rescue" sex workers. She argues against efforts to criminalize sex work and describes how traditional methods of sex-work solicitation such as red-light districts have changed as such districts become gentrified and much sex work moves online. The book was published by Verso Books in collaboration with Jacobin and received positive critical reception.

== Background ==
Author Melissa Gira Grant speaks about Playing The Whore on The Laura Flanders Show (full clip)

Author Melissa Gira Grant worked as a sex worker in order to earn money to become a writer. She became a journalist and wrote widely about the sex industry. Before writing Playing the Whore, Grant was familiar with the canon of news articles about sex workers, often with the perspective that sex work was an inherent issue. She felt there was a dearth of post-2000 books about sex work and that most books before this were memoirs. Playing the Whore is about the industry and politics of sex work, rather than Grant's personal experiences; Grant said that she might write a book about her experiences in future.

Playing the Whore was published by Verso Books in association with the magazine Jacobin as part of a series focusing on socialist perspectives to culture and politics. Grant is a contributing editor to the Jacobin.

== Synopsis ==
Grant views sex work as a form of labor. Through a social-constructivism lens, Grant analyzes the concept of the "prostitute imaginary"—narratives of sex work in the public consciousness. She argues that the social process which turns a "woman" into a "prostitute" involves dehumanization and allows for exertion of control over women sex workers. Grant contends that typecasting all sex work as either "exploitation" or "empowerment" creates a false dichotomy, dissuading analysis of systemic issues within the sex industry, and systemic issues which cause people to enter the industry. Two examples of the latter are economic issues which lead people to survival sex and a lack of worker agency in industries other than sex work.

Grant describes a period in U.S. history of feminist sex wars in which advocates of sex work were in opposition to some second-wave feminists. Grant disagrees with anti–sex-work feminists who view sex work as inherent violence or sex workers as inherently in need of liberation. She draws similarities between feminists and conservatives opposed to sex work. Describing a "rescue industry" of non-governmental organizations, religious organizations, police and journalists, Grant criticizes that efforts to "rescue" sex workers often use violence or force. She finds that it leads to surveillance of workers by police and evictions by landlords, but that it does not have an effect on the rate of full-service sex work. She writes that criminalization and stigmatization of sex work allows or condones violence against sex workers by clients.

Grant criticizes the United States Agency for International Development's (USAID) intervention in Cambodia made with the aim of "eradicating" prostitution. Though a UNAIDS survey of Cambodian sex workers found that only 12% had been coerced into their labor, the USAID led some such workers to be detained in cages and given employment sewing in poor working conditions. She finds that the Swedish approach to criminalizing the purchase but not the sale of sex work, part of the "Nordic model", was enacted without sufficient consultation of sex workers. In New York City, condoms can be used as evidence of prostitution, which leads to sex workers not carrying condoms to avoid arrest, according to Grant.

The author also discusses changes in red-light districts: she reports that many have become gentrified, leading many sex workers in such environments to be more isolated or less safe. Additionally, much sex work is now organized online, which averts some safety issues and creates new ones. Grant discusses sexualization and the prominence of pornography in contemporary culture, but finds that a confusion between active enthusiasm and "unenthusiastic consent" with regard to sex workers is made by many who argue that they are to blame for such changes in culture. Grant believes that managers in the industry, such as strip-club owners, are the ones responsible for "pornification" rather than the workers.

== Reception ==
Eilís Ward in the Community Development Journal summarized that the book is "an excellent read for anyone [...] open to thinking through their position on the sex trade". She praised Grant for her "sharp prose and a no-prisoners stand" and "intellectual abilities" which are "well served in the polemical and provocative form". Michaele L. Ferguson in Perspectives on Politics found the book an "uncompromising call for sex workers' rights as human rights is an important reminder of what a radical political vision might look like", but criticized a failure to address the issues of the gendering of sex work, in which labor is most commonly performed by women and purchased by men.

The Washington Post's Mike Konczal praised Grant as "one of the most interesting policy thinkers" on the topic of U.S. sex work. He found that the sentence which changed his opinion most was: "Sex workers should not be expected to defend the existence of sex work in order to have the right to do it free from harm". Katie Toth of the Village Voice praised Grant's choice to write about politics and ideas rather than her own experiences, and reviewed the book as "thoroughly researched" and "eminently readable" in a list of the Village Voice's "Favorite Books of 2014".
