= 2025 August Republican National Committee chairmanship election =

- August 22, 2025

168 members of the Republican National Committee
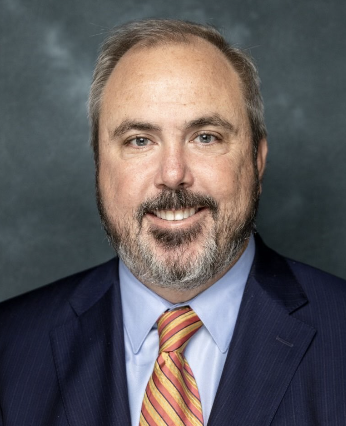
Candidate	Joe Gruters
Caucus vote	Acclamation
Chairman before election
Michael Whatley
Elected Chairman
Joe Gruters

The 2025 August Republican National Committee chairmanship election was held on August 22, 2025, at the Republican National Committee’s summer meeting in Atlanta, Georgia. Florida state senator Joe Gruters was elected Chairman of the Republican National Committee by unanimous voice vote after being endorsed by President Donald Trump and outgoing chairman Michael Whatley.

== Results ==
=== Endorsements ===
Joe Gruters

U.S. presidents

- Donald Trump, 45th and 47th president of the United States (2017–2021, 2025–present)

RNC leaders

- Michael Whatley, outgoing chairman of the Republican National Committee

==== Nominated ====
- Joe Gruters, incoming chairman of the Republican National Committee

Candidate	Result
Joe Gruters	Acclamation
