= 2026 Pawtucket shooting =

Mass shooting in Rhode Island, US

- Location: 41.8810°N 71.3874°W; Dennis M. Lynch Arena, 25 Andrew D Ferland Way; Pawtucket, Rhode Island, US
- Date: February 16, 2026; 8 months ago c. 2:30 p.m. (EST; UTC−05:00)
- Target: Family members and friend
- Attack type: Mass shooting; murder–suicide; familicide
- Weapons: 10mm Glock 29SF Gen 3 semi-automatic pistol; .357 SIG Sauer P226 semi-automatic pistol
- Deaths: 4 (including the perpetrator)
- Injuries: 2
- Perpetrator: Roberta Dorgano (Note: Has been identified by law enforcement and the press by her legal name, Robert K. Dorgan. Also may have gone by Roberta Esposito.)
- Defender: Attendees in the stands
- Motive: Under investigation

On February 16, 2026, a mass shooting occurred at the Dennis M. Lynch Arena in Pawtucket, Rhode Island, United States. During a high school ice hockey game, 56-year-old Roberta Dorgano opened fire on her family members and a family friend. The incident resulted in the deaths of her ex-wife and their adult son and the suicide of Dorgano, and left three others hospitalized in critical condition. One of the injured victims, the ex-wife's father, died at a hospital nine days later. The shooting, which police described as an incident of domestic violence, occurred in front of dozens of spectators and was partially captured on a livestream of the game.

== Background ==
Pawtucket, Rhode Island, is the fourth-largest city in Rhode Island, north of the state capital of Providence and near the border with Massachusetts. Dennis M. Lynch Arena is an indoor ice hockey rink, built in 1973 by the city of Pawtucket. It was named after Pawtucket mayor Dennis M. Lynch in 1977, and was sold to private owners in the late 2000s. As of 2026, it is managed and operated by EDGE Sports Group. The venue offers public skating sessions and hosted ice hockey games and figure and ice skating lessons and was the home of the Johnson & Wales Wildcats hockey team.

The state of Rhode Island has a higher rate of intimate partner violence against women than any other New England state. According to a survey conducted by the Centers for Disease Control and Prevention, 46.7% of female respondents in Rhode Island reported having experienced contact sexual violence, physical violence, or stalking by an intimate partner at some point in their lives. Since 2016, the state has suffered 60 instances of domestic violence resulting in a homicide, of which nine occurred since January 2025 and eight of those involved firearms.

The attack occurred two months after another mass shooting in Rhode Island, at Brown University in adjacent Providence, in which two students were killed and nine others injured.

== Shooting ==
The shooting took place at approximately 2:30 p.m. EST during a boys' hockey game between the Coventry/Johnston co-op team and the Blackstone Valley Co-op, which includes players from St. Raphael Academy, Providence Country Day School, North Providence High School, and North Smithfield High School. The shooter, Roberta Dorgano, frequently attended her family's hockey games at the arena. According to law enforcement officials, Dorgano opened fire on four members of her family and a family friend, who were attending the game. Video showed Dorgano arriving at the hockey arena, then exiting the arena and returning not long after. Dorgano was seated with her ex-wife and family in the stands, and there did not appear to be a confrontation or conversation between her and victims before she opened fire. Aidan Dorgan, an adult son of Dorgano, attempted to shield Rhonda Dorgan, the ex-wife of Dorgano, from gunfire and attempted to disarm Dorgano before he was fatally shot.

Eyewitnesses and video evidence described a rapid burst of gunfire, with as many as 11 shots heard in quick succession, causing panic among players and spectators. Many players and fans scrambled for cover, with some students abandoning their skates and equipment as they fled the arena. A livestream of the match captured the scene as people dove to the floor and fled for the exits. A mother later recounted that many were unaware of what was happening at first, as many believed the sounds were just the players banging their skates on the boards. A player stated that many players ran towards the locker rooms after the shooting began and barricaded themselves in, with another stating that they believed the gunshots were balloons popping.

A man who was in attendance at the game lunged for Dorgano's weapon after she opened fire and got his hand stuck in the slide of the gun, preventing it from firing, and he ended up on top of her. The shooter then hoisted the man into the air before two other men who were in attendance at the game joined him in attempting to subdue Dorgano. During the struggle, one of the other men put Dorgano into a chokehold, causing Dorgano to fall to the ground. Dorgano then reached into a jacket she was wearing and produced a second handgun, which she put into her mouth and fatally shot herself. Two retired firefighters and emergency medical technicians and a nurse who were in attendance at the game provided first aid to the victims in the immediate aftermath of the shooting. Police and emergency responders arrived within minutes of the shooting, with the first officers on scene initially unaware that Dorgano was dead, and secured the scene and tended to the victims.

== Victims ==
Three people were killed and two critically injured, all but one were related to the shooter. The deceased were Dorgano's son, Aidan Dorgan, her ex-wife Rhonda Dorgan, and her father-in-law, Gerald Dorgan. Gerald died two weeks after the shooting, on February 25. The two injured, Rhonda's mother and a family friend, were treated at Rhode Island Hospital.

== Perpetrator ==
Roberta Dorgano (July 15, 1969 – February 16, 2026), a 56-year-old trans woman, was identified as the perpetrator by law enforcement officials. Dorgano joined the US Marine Corps on April 26, 1988, but was discharged three months later on July 13, 1988, her service being "incongruent with Marine Corps' expectations and standards". In 1989, Dorgano was charged with simple assault and battery, but the case was dismissed. Dorgano later lived in Jacksonville, Florida, and worked as a truck driver. Dorgano owned a van which was registered with a shipping company in Bath, Maine, and she had told employees working there that she lived in her van. At the time of the shooting, Dorgano was employed at Bath Iron Works.

One of the hockey players playing that afternoon was her son. Dorgano had six children with three different women, and according to her daughter a history of mental health issues, and she had been "ostracized" from the family due to "a long history of violence and abuse". In February 2020, she accused her mother of assaulting her and acting in a "violent, threatening or tumultuous manner". Her mother was charged with assault, battery, and disorderly conduct though the case was later dismissed. That same year, during a time when she was living in a house that her father-in-law owned and had begun her gender transition, Dorgano reported to police that her father-in-law had told her "there is no way a tranny is going to stay in my house" and that he had threatened to hire an Asian gang to kill her if she did not drop the charges against her mother. Her father-in-law was charged with intimidation of witnesses and victims of crimes, in addition to obstruction of the judicial system, but in 2023, those charges were dropped after Dorgano decided to no longer pursue the case. Court documents showed that an Asian relative who was going to be the middle-man to hire the gang in the alleged plot was actually a doctor practicing in the Worcester, Massachusetts, area.

Dorgano returned to Jacksonville and her former wife, Rhonda Dorgan, filed for divorce which was finalized in June 2021, writing "gender reassignment surgery, narcissistic + personality disorder traits" [sic] as the reason for the divorce before crossing it out and writing "irreconcilable differences". Dorgano and her former wife married in 1992 in Rehoboth, Massachusetts, and were first cousins, once removed.

A photo taken sometime before the shooting showed that Dorgano at some point appeared to have a Schutzstaffel insignia tattoo with a skull on it on her right arm, but whether or not she had the tattoo at the time of the shooting has not been confirmed by authorities. In addition to the tattoo, she posted pro-Nazi content on Twitter, including stating repeatedly that being "to the right of Hitler" was a "compliment" and replying "wp" to an image of someone giving a Nazi salute. Dorgano expressed in her posts hatred for Democrats, support for President Donald Trump, and that she rejected the idea that all transgender people were liberals. In 2018, Dorgano tweeted that she was a "hyper - conservative , hyper- Christian and a hyper gender- dysphoric transwoman" [sic].

A day before the shooting, Dorgano replied to a tweet about Delaware representative Sarah McBride, the first openly transgender person elected to Congress, which misgendered McBride, writing "Keep bashing us. but do not wonder why we Go BERSERK" [sic]. On that same day, Dorgano also replied to a tweet by Kentucky representative Thomas Massie, in which Massie alluded to his deceased wife, Rhonda Massie, writing that she also had "a beloved RHONDA too" [sic].

== Aftermath ==
The shooting prompted a significant police response and a temporary lockdown of Rhode Island Hospital as a precaution. Coventry Public Schools of Rhode Island superintendent Don Cowart and Providence Country Day School both confirmed the safety of all players of each team were safe and accounted for. The Rhode Island Interscholastic League announced the temporary suspension of events after the shooting, which ended four days after the shooting, while the Blackstone Valley School cancelled the remainder of their regular season.

The Pawtucket School Department announced that it would provide additional counseling and support services after the shooting which would be made available for all students, families, school staff, and community members. Shea High School, which had a staff member injured in the shooting, planned to have a one-hour delayed start to classes on February 23 to allow time for preparations for support for students and allow school leaders to connect with educators at the school. On February 26, the Dennis M. Lynch Arena was re-opened by its owners. A day later, the Pawtucket Police Department released police body camera footage of one of the first police officers to arrive on scene, blurring most of the footage.

On March 11, Colin Dorgan, who lost his mother, brother, and grandfather in the shooting, scored in double overtime against Portsmouth to advance Blackstone Valley Co-op to the Rhode Island Division 2 final. Blackstone Valley Co-op only returned to play hockey in a best-of-three quarterfinal series, with the son also scoring two goals to advance Blackstone Valley Co-op to the semifinals. Colin described scoring in double overtime as the "greatest moment" in his life. The Blackstone Valley Co-op coach, Chris Librizzi, said that he had gotten together with Colin and his sister for 14 days straight after the shooting, in order to "keep them together as a family" and that the "bonding that this team went through every day the last two weeks has been nothing less than superior". Seven days later, Blackstone Valley Co-op won the championship with Colin representing the team as captain. After the game, Colin said he was nervous about returning, but that his team and support network helped him push through the grief of losing his family members and that he "truly felt it in my heart and my soul" that his lost family members were with him throughout the tournament.

ESPN aired a documentary on SportsCenter on July 26 highlighting Blackstone Valley Co-op's championship victory following the mass shooting. The documentary's reporting was done by Jeremy Schaap, and featured interviews with Colin, his sister, Librizzi, and other people close to the team.

In October, a nonprofit called "Wings of Hope: The Rhonda and Aidan Dorgan Foundation" was created in honor of shooting victims Rhonda and Aidan Dorgan. The goal of the nonprofit is to support single mothers with student athletes, and potentially to provide academic scholarships.

== Investigation ==
The Pawtucket Police Department described the shooting as a "targeted event" stemming from a family dispute, and officials classified it as a suspected familicide and murder–suicide. Agencies involved in the investigation included the Bureau of Alcohol, Tobacco, Firearms and Explosives (ATF), the Rhode Island State Police, and several local departments. Police recovered firearms from the scene, interviewed over 100 witnesses, reviewed footage of the shooting, and located a white van with a Maine license plate that belonged to Roberta Dorgano. Both weapons, a 10mm Glock 29SF Gen 3 pistol and a .357 SIG Sauer P226 pistol used in the shooting, were legally purchased, and she had a gun permit from Florida at the time of her death. Investigators have not determined if Dorgano had a concealed carry permit in Rhode Island. The ATF traced the weapons and found that the Glock had been purchased on September 19, 2021, in Jacksonville, Florida, and the SIG Sauer had been purchased on July 13, 2019, in West Warwick, Rhode Island.

Pawtucket police chief Tina Goncalves said that there was "no indication" of impending violence at the ice rink and that they were looking into a Twitter account suspected to be connected to the shooter. Goncalves also said that the shooter's gender identity was "irrelevant to our investigation at this point", but that she knew that Dorgano went by a different name than her legal name and was wearing "female clothes" at the time of the shooting.

On February 18, the Pawtucket Police Department searched Dorgano's apartment and work locker in Bath, Maine and also at a storage unit in Brunswick, Maine, in conjunction with the Maine State Police and Federal Bureau of Investigation. Investigators seized an electronic device, firearm accessories, and personal identification documents from the apartment and an AR-15–style rifle, a sawed-off shotgun, a handgun frame and other firearm accessories, ammunition, and mail addressed to Dorgano at the storage unit.

== Reactions ==
Statements of shock and condolences were issued by local officials, school administrators, and state leaders. US senator Jack Reed of Rhode Island and Rhode Island governor Dan McKee both called the shooting a horrific tragedy and praised the swift response of law enforcement and emergency responders. McKee said that his administration would launch a statewide "support hub" for those who were affected by the shooting. On March 31, McKee invited the Blackstone Valley Co-op team and two men who helped to subdue Dorgano to the Rhode Island State House, where they were honored by the governor. US representative Gabe Amo, who represents the area, released a statement which said that he was "saddened that gun violence has impacted another community" and that he was in touch with local officials and prepared to "help secure any requested federal assistance".

The mayor of Pawtucket, Donald Grebien, said that the shooting was a "stark reminder" of the consequences of domestic violence and gun violence and Pawtucket police chief Tina Goncalves requested that people "respect" the family of the victims after the "unfathomable" shooting. Michael Chippendale, the Rhode Island House of Representatives minority leader, said that "the firearm was the means, not the cause" of the shooting, and that the shooting was instead caused by "severe or untreated mental health struggles, instability, isolation, and warning signs that were missed or ignored". Pawtucket school leaders said that mental health and counseling resources were being made available for students after the shooting.

The shooting prompted backlash centering around the perpetrator's gender identity from some conservative and right-wing commentators. Former chairman of the Republican Party of Florida, Christian Ziegler, posted to Twitter after the shooting that "President Trump needs to re-open mental institutions, and society needs to stop celebrating & encouraging transgender status". The anti-LGBTQ and far-right Twitter account, Libs of TikTok, which is operated by former real estate agent Chaya Raichik, posted to the platform that "Transgender people are violent and a danger to society". Political commentator Lawrence B. Jones stated on the Fox News talk show The Five that he believed that transgender people should not be allowed to own guns.

The head coach of the United States men's national ice hockey team, Mike Sullivan, spoke about the incident while speaking to reporters during the 2026 Winter Olympics in Milan, Italy, saying that it was "a terrible tragedy and something that hits close to home" and that he wanted to "let everyone know how sorry we are and that we feel for them and for their friends and their family". The Boston Bruins of the National Hockey League released a statement expressing "heartfelt sympathies" and that they were "keeping everyone in the Pawtucket community in our thoughts". Their American Hockey League affiliate, Providence Bruins, also released a similar statement.

The Boston Bruins and their opponents, the Columbus Blue Jackets, held a moment of silence during their first game since the Olympics on February 26. The Providence Bruins reached out to the Coventry/Johnston and the Blackstone Valley Co-op teams and reconditioned the blades of the players for free who ran in their ice skates away from the shooting on concrete, which badly damaged the blades, so that they would not have to pay the fees associated with having them reconditioned in their own time. On March 1, the Providence Bruins invited the teams to the Amica Mutual Pavilion and brought the players out on the ice during pregame as a show of support. On March 14, the Providence Bruins hosted first responders to the shooting and honored their response and wore special first responder-themed jerseys before their game against Hartford Wolf Pack. The Blackstone Valley Co-op team met with the Boston Bruins on March 23 at the Warrior Ice Arena. Boston Bruins goalkeeper Jeremy Swayman said of the Blackstone Valley Co-op players that it was "cool to have these guys in the locker room, and to see their excitement and really enjoy the good things that hockey brings us everyday".

The executive director of Rhode Island Coalition Against Domestic Violence, Lucy Rios, said that "domestic violence is not a private matter, and it is not a personal conflict that should be minimized" and that "it is a serious crime that takes lives and leaves lasting trauma in its wake". Kelly Henry, a member of the Providence-based domestic violence resource agency Sojourner House, said of the shooting that "it almost takes your breath away" and that "whenever something horrible like this happens, I always just have to take a pause and I kind of send energy to the family, to the community, to just the loss, and let myself grieve for a moment because it is hugely impactful".

A day after the shooting, two vigils were held at Slatersville Congregational Church in North Smithfield, Rhode Island, to honor the victims of the shooting and provide comfort for the community. Community members also left flowers and hockey sticks outside the Dennis M. Lynch Arena, where the shooting took place, as a tribute to the victims. The Rhode Island Interscholastic League resumed hockey games on February 20, with the first game happening between The Prout School and the East Bay co-op teams featuring a moment of silence for the victims before the start.

== See also ==
- 2025 Brown University shooting, a mass shooting in Rhode Island which occurred two months earlier
- Crime in Rhode Island
- Livestreamed crime
- List of filmed mass shootings
- List of mass shootings in the United States in 2026
- Misinformation about violence by transgender people
