= 2026 Vienna, Georgia, shooting =

Mass shooting in Georgia, US

- Location: 32.0950°N 83.7856°W; Vienna, Georgia, US
- Date: October 4, 2026 c. 1:15 a.m. (EDT)
- Attack type: Mass shooting
- Deaths: 2
- Injuries: 42 (26 by gunfire)

On October 4, 2026, a mass shooting occurred during a homecoming party in Vienna, Georgia, United States. Two men were killed, and 42 others were injured. The following investigation led to eight arrests and ten people being charged.

== Shooting ==
The shooting happened around 1:15 a.m. EDT on Pine Street between the 600 and 900 blocks, during a block party for Dooly County High School homecoming celebrations. Over 1,000 people attended the celebration. Dooly County Sheriff Craig Peavy said that over 50 rounds were fired during the shooting, and some people were hit by cars while trying to flee.

== Victims ==
Two men, 21-year-old Jaquevion Jackson, from Cordele, and 23-year-old Macaleb Jackson, from Hawkinsville, were killed. 42 other people were injured, 26 of which were by gunfire, whose ages ranged from 14 to 51 years old; several people were injured by being hit by cars.

== Investigation ==
As of October 5, 2026, no arrests have been announced related to the shooting. On October 9, 2026, 17-year-old Kahdarius Kayvon Ray of Vienna was arrested and charged with one count of possession of a firearm/handgun under the age of 18 and one count of participating in criminal street gang activity. On October 14, Dooly County deputies arrested 36-year-old Kelcy Smith and 40-year-old Johntavirous Robinson, both from Cordele, with two counts of Participation in Criminal Street Gang Activity, Possession of a Firearm by a Convicted Felon, and Tampering with Evidence.

On November 5, the Georgia Bureau of Investigation announced that five more people had been arrested and charged in the shooting: 19-year-old Latravis Keonta Bentley of Vienna, 19-year-old Ty'Darrious T'Jai Dawson of Cordele, 23-year-old Devontre Jaquon Holton of Cordele, and 23-year-old Demari Jaheem Nixon of Cordele, were all charged with felony murder, aggravated assault, aggravated battery, participation in criminal street gang activity, and possession of a firearm during the commission of a felony, along with 17-year-old Kahdarius Ray who was previously charged on October 9. Additionally, 16-year-old Keontae Towns of Cordele was charged with felony murder, aggravated assault, aggravated battery, participation in criminal street gang activity, and possession of firearm under the age of 21. Additionally, 19-year-old Brexton Esamuel Gaston of Cordele and 34-year-old Vanravious Rashad Williams of Perry are not in custody and have been charged with felony murder, aggravated assault, aggravated battery, participation in criminal street gang activity, and possession of a firearm during the commission of a felony and felony murder, aggravated assault, aggravated battery, participation in criminal street gang activity and possession of a firearm under the age of 21 respectively. The investigation remains active and ongoing.

== See also ==
- List of mass shootings in the United States in 2026
- 2026 Erie shooting
