= Evan Power =

Chair of the Florida Republican Party

Chair of the Florida Republican Party
- Incumbent
- Assumed office January 8, 2024*
- Preceded by: Christian Ziegler

Personal details
- Born: November 15, 1981 (age 44) Nashville, Tennessee, U.S.
- Party: Republican
- Education: Florida State University (BS, MS)
- *Power assumed Ziegler's duties on December 17, 2023.

Evan Power is an American politician and political strategist serving as the chair of the Republican Party of Florida since 2024. Power serves on the Republican National Committee and served as a Republican Presidential elector in 2024. Power is a government affairs consultant with the Ramba Consulting Group. He was chair of the Republican Party of Leon County, Florida from 2012-2024 and now serves as Leon County State Committeeman. Power was the vice chair of the Republican Party of Florida. In January 2024, he was elected in a 135 to 65 vote to succeed Christian Ziegler as the chair. He was endorsed by governor Ron DeSantis. In January 2025 Power was re-elected by a resounding vote of 183-19.

== Early life and career ==
Power is a native of Chattanooga, Tennessee. He graduated from The McCallie School. Power graduated from Florida State University in 2004 with a degree in Finance. He then went to work for Florida Rep. Marco Rubio, now Secretary of State. During this time Power became active in the Leon County Republican Party.

Power was elected chairman of the Leon County Republican Party in 2012 after failing to win election to the Leon County Soil and Water commission in 2012 and assistant treasurer of the Republican Party of Florida in 2015.

Under his leadership and despite Leon County’s blue tilt, the local party enjoyed successes including Corey Simon’s win for a state Senate seat not held by Republicans since reconstruction.

In February 2023 Power narrowly lost the race for chairman of the Republican Party of Florida to Christian Ziegler by a 126–100 vote. Power was subsequently elected as vice chairman of the Republican Party of Florida.

After allegations of sexual misconduct were made against Christian Ziegler, Power called a special board meeting of the Republican Party of Florida executive board in December 2023. On January 8, 2024, Power was elected chairman of the Republican Party of Florida by a vote of 135–65, coming into the meeting with endorsements from Florida's biggest Republican figures, including Governor Ron DeSantis, U.S. Senator Marco Rubio, Congressman Matt Gaetz and former state party chairs Blaise Ingoglia and Joe Gruters.

== Chairmanship ==
Under his leadership the Republican Party of Florida grew their registration advantage to over 1 million more voters than the Democrats.

In the 2024 election, Donald Trump's 13 point win was the largest victory for a Presidential Candidate since 1988. Every county shifted to Republicans and 6 counties flipped to the Republican side, including Miami-Dade County that had not been won for a Republican since 1988. Senator Rick Scott was re-elected to the Senate as well. The Party also defended their legislative super majority in the state house for the first time in history.

During the 2024 election, the Republican Party of Florida endorsed against two constitutional amendments, Amendment 3 to legalize recreational marijuana and Amendment 4 to legalize abortion to viability. Florida voters rejected both amendments even though millions were spent in support.

In January 2025, Power was re-elected by a vote of 183-19.

== Personal life ==
Power is married to Melissa and has a son.

In 2018, Power was arrested and charged with driving under the influence of alcohol (DUI), after refusing to take a breathalyzer test. The charge was reduced to reckless driving, to which Power pleaded no contest. He was ordered to complete six months of probation and 50 hours of community service.

Party political offices
Preceded by Christian Ziegler	Chair of the Florida Republican Party; 2024–present	Incumbent
