= Midland shooting =

Midland shooting may refer to:

- 2019 Midland–Odessa shootings, which began in Midland
- 2026 Midland shooting
