= Moms for Liberty =

American conservative political organization

- Formation: January 1, 2021; 5 years ago
- Founders: Tina Descovich Tiffany Justice Bridget Ziegler
- Purpose: Restriction of school curricula
- Headquarters: Melbourne, Florida, U.S.
- Region served: United States
- Revenue: $5.82 million (2024)
- Expenses: $5.51 million (2024)
- Website: momsforliberty.org

Moms for Liberty is an American political organization that advocates against school curricula that mention LGBTQ rights, race and ethnicity, critical race theory, and discrimination. Multiple chapters have also campaigned to ban books that address gender and sexuality from school libraries. Founded in January 2021, the group began by campaigning against COVID-19 responses in schools such as mask and vaccine mandates. Moms for Liberty is influential within the Republican Party.

Moms for Liberty has been variously described as a conservative, populist, reactionary, extremist, and far-right group. The group has been criticized for harassment, for deepening divisions among parents, for making students' education more difficult, and for having close ties to the Republican Party rather than being a genuine grassroots effort.

== Founding and structure ==
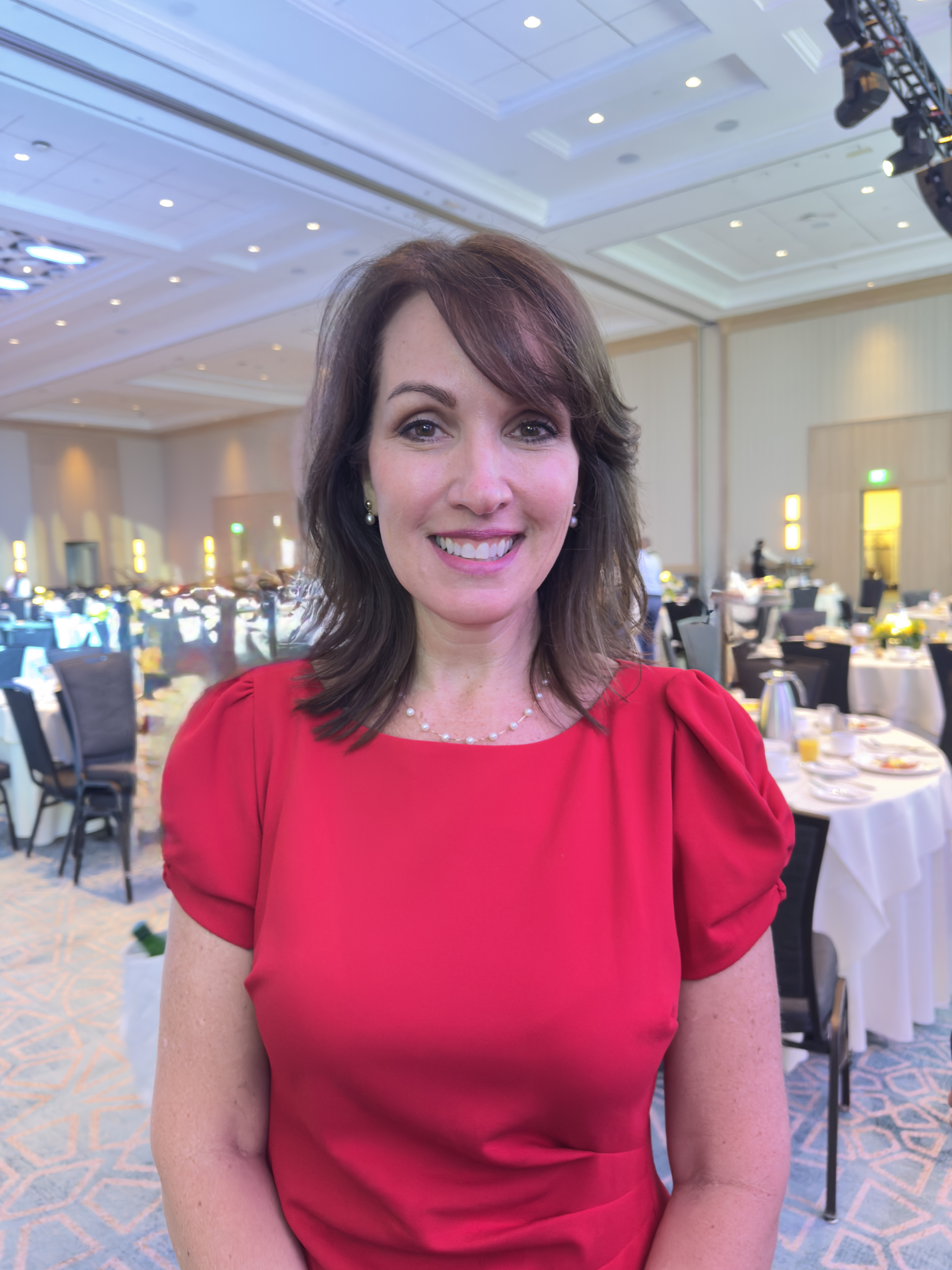
Moms for Liberty co-founder Tina Descovich at an event in October 2025.

Moms for Liberty was co-founded in Florida on January 1, 2021, by former school board members Tina Descovich and Tiffany Justice, and by then-current school board member Bridget Ziegler, the wife of Florida Republican Party Chairman Christian Ziegler. Republican activist and campaign consultant Marie Rogerson is the third-leading member of Moms for Liberty. Descovich receives a stipend as Moms for Liberty's executive director.

Descovich conceived of the organization in the fall of 2020, after losing her seat on the Brevard County school board in a primary to former district employee Jennifer Jenkins, who campaigned against Descovich's opposition to mask mandates during the COVID-19 pandemic and teacher raises.

As of their first national gathering in Tampa, Florida, on July 14–17, 2022, Moms for Liberty said they had 195 chapters in 37 states and nearly 100,000 members. In June 2023, it said that it had 245 chapters in 45 states and a membership of more than 115,000. As of July 2023, the organization has 285 chapters in 45 states.

== Ideology and political affiliations ==
Moms for Liberty has been described by many, such as the Southern Poverty Law Center, as conservative, populist and reactionary. All three founders are registered Republicans, and the organization has ties to the Republican Party. The leaders of Moms for Liberty have stated that their organization is non-partisan and grounded in conservative values.

The Southern Poverty Law Center, which tracks extremist groups, described Moms for Liberty as a "far-right organization that engages in anti-student inclusion activities and self-identifies as part of the modern parental rights movement" that emerged "out of opposition to public health regulations for COVID-19, opposes LGBTQ and racially inclusive school curriculum, and has advocated books bans."

The Southern Poverty Law Center noted that the organization has associated with the Proud Boys, a far right neo-fascist organization. It also noted that the organization has affiliated with the anti-LGBTQ group Gays Against Groomers.

Moms for Liberty has praised Florida Republicans such as Governor Ron DeSantis, referring to him on social media as "the Parents' Governor". DeSantis, along with other prominent Florida Republicans, spoke at Moms for Liberty's first national gathering in Tampa, Florida, in July 2022. Crediting Moms for Liberty with bringing new voters to the Republican Party, Christian Ziegler told The Washington Post in October 2021 that he had "been trying for a dozen years to get 20- and 30-year-old females involved with the Republican Party, and it was a heavy lift to get that demographic. But now Moms for Liberty has done it for me."

In December 2022, the "Moms for Liberty Miami" was one of the organizations of an anti-LGBTQ "Protect the Children" rally in Fort Lauderdale, Florida; the rally, which was attended by about 20 members of the Proud Boys, was promoted by right-wing outlets, such as Breitbart, OANN, and the avowedly antisemitic Goyim Defense League.

The group's 2023 annual conference in June featured Republican presidential candidates Donald Trump, Ron DeSantis, Nikki Haley, and Vivek Ramaswamy.

In June 2023, the Hamilton County, Indiana, chapter of Moms for Liberty printed a quotation "he alone, who owns the youth, gains the future", attributing the quotation to Adolf Hitler on the top of the front page of their monthly newsletter. The chapter chairwoman later apologized. At the Moms for Liberty conference days later, Tiffany Justice said to an audience, "One of our moms in a newsletter quotes Hitler. I stand with that mom." The audience cheered after both sentences.

== Advocacy ==
The organization began by campaigning against COVID-19 related health safety restrictions in schools, challenging mask mandates and associated local policies. Members of Moms for Liberty broadened their agenda to encompass other school-related items, focusing on the way issues such as racism and religion are addressed in reading materials provided to students. The leaders of the group have accused educators of seeking to indoctrinate students with "secret Marxist" beliefs, and the group has targeted the use of social–emotional learning in schools.

=== Curriculum complaints and legal action ===
In June 2021, the chair of the Williamson County Moms for Liberty chapter told Tennessee's Department of Education in a letter that the district's curriculum was in violation of a recently enacted state law banning the teaching of ideas related to critical race theory. Specific complaints were made about texts featuring Martin Luther King Jr., Ruby Bridges, Civil Rights Movement protests, and school segregation. In November 2021, the Tennessee Department of Education rejected the complaint on procedural grounds.

In November 2021, the Brevard County Moms for Liberty chapter filed a lawsuit against the Brevard County School Board over its public participation policy, saying that the board has used the policy to limit speech and access of opposing viewpoints during meetings.

=== Harassment and threats toward teachers and public school officials ===
Members and leaders of Moms for Liberty have been accused of harassing or threatening teachers, school librarians, school board members, and opposing activists by Media Matters for America.

Jenkins, who replaced Descovich on the Brevard County school board, said that she was harassed by members of Moms for Liberty. According to Jenkins, a member of the group filed a false child abuse report with the county department of Child and Family Services against her.

In April 2021, the Facebook group "Mandate Masks in Brevard County schools" (now "Families for Safe Schools") was founded in an effort to combat the Brevard County Moms for Liberty chapter.

Moms for Liberty was criticized for offering a bounty to members of the public who "caught" teachers introducing texts or lessons in violation of New Hampshire's new law restricting discussions of race in school classrooms. On November 10, 2021, the New Hampshire Department of Education announced a website questionnaire to make it easier for the public to help enforce the law. A couple of days later, the New Hampshire Moms for Liberty chapter offered a monetary reward for doing so, tweeting: "We've got $500 for the person that first successfully catches a public school teacher breaking this law". Republican Governor of New Hampshire Chris Sununu's spokesman said "The Governor condemns the tweet referencing 'bounties' and any sort of financial incentive is wholly inappropriate and has no place".

Larry Leaven, a gay man in a same-sex marriage, became superintendent of the Florida Union Free School District in 2021. He immediately began receiving homophobic harassment from community members, with members of the Orange County, New York chapter of Moms for Liberty being the most persistent. Of the three board members elected in May 2022 on a platform opposing "critical race theory", one was a Moms for Liberty member, one was married to a Moms for Liberty member, and one received funding from Moms for Liberty members. Leaven resigned his position in November 2022, though Leaven's supporters say he was forced out by the board.

In December 2021, Descovich and Justice denied that Moms for Liberty members have threatened school boards, and denounced inappropriate behavior by members of the organization. In June 2023, Justice said that the organization removes chapter chairs who violate the group's code of conduct.

In June 2022, Cabot, Arkansas police opened an investigation after a recording surfaced featuring one of the group's leaders fantasizing about shooting school librarians, saying "they would all be plowed down with a freaking gun".

In March 2023, a South Carolina Moms for Liberty member that served on a local school board was asked to resign after allegedly making violent threats towards local teachers.

=== Book banning efforts ===
According to The Daily Beast, a spreadsheet accompanying the Williamson County letter of complaint contained several other stated concerns about the county's curriculum. An article about police brutality against civil rights demonstrators in the 1960s was criticized for its "negative view of Firemen and police." A fictional account of the American Civil War used with fifth-graders was deemed unsuitable because of its depictions of "out of marriage families between white men and black women". A book about Galileo Galilei, an astronomer persecuted by the Catholic Church for theorizing the that Earth revolves around the Sun, should, according to the spreadsheet, not be read without some counterbalancing praise of the church: "Where is the HERO of the church?", asks the spreadsheet notation, "to contrast with their mistakes? ... Both good and bad should be represented". A picture book about seahorses was condemned for depicting "mating seahorses with pictures of positions and discussion of the male carrying the eggs." The Williamson County Moms for Liberty chapter told The Daily Beast in an e-mail: "Some books should be removed entirely. Some books are objectionable only because of how they are presented via the accompanying teacher's manual. And yes, some books would be better suited to a higher grade level due to their age inappropriate content."

In 2021, the Indian River County, Florida, chapter requested the local school board remove from school libraries 51 books the group "deem(ed) to be pornographic or sexually explicit." A young adult book about growing up gay, All Boys Aren't Blue, was pulled from the Vero Beach High School library after the group objected to it as being in violation of a Florida statute against providing access to pornography to children. The Hernando chapter objected to Looking for Alaska, The Absolutely True Diary of a Part-Time Indian, and two books by National Book Award winner Alex Gino.

In December 2021, the Wake County, North Carolina chapter filed a criminal complaint against the Wake County Public School System over the books Lawn Boy, Gender Queer: a Memoir, and George.

According to WFTS-TV, as of December 2021, "several schools" had removed books from shelves due to the efforts of various Moms for Liberty chapters.

In 2023, the Miami-Dade chapter of Moms for Liberty claimed credit for the removal of The Hill We Climb from a school library; the book was an adaptation of the poem of the same name by poet Amanda Gorman. The activist whose complaint prompted the removal of the poetry also has links to the Proud Boys.

Media Matters for America alleges Moms for Liberty has partnered with several conservative organizations to introduce conservative books into public school libraries while engaged in censorship efforts.

=== Opposition to LGBTQ rights ===
In early 2022, a Texas mother ended her child's access to counseling sessions with the Rainbow Youth Project after reading posts by Moms for Liberty. Her child attempted to commit suicide that day. The mother has since said that she believes their efforts were "to indoctrinate me to be a foot soldier for their cause, to hold bake sales and raise money, go to the school boards and stand up and fight against them. Looking back, it was never about [her child]. It was about them."

In July 2022, the Moms for Liberty Twitter account was suspended for criticizing a California gender-affirming health care bill. In August 2022, a Florida Moms for Liberty activist advocated for separating LGBTQ students into "specialized" classes "like for example children with autism, Down Syndrome".

== Reception ==
Critics have accused Moms for Liberty of deepening divisions among parents and making it more challenging for school officials to educate students. Media Matters for America accused the organization of using "parental rights" as a cover for strategically harassing public schools. The American Historical Association describes the group as going beyond participating in controversies and laying out its own vision on education policies to cross "a boundary in its attempts to silence and harass teachers", rendering it "impossible for historians to teach with professional integrity without risking job loss and other penalties".

Defense of Democracy, a Dutchess County, New York-based organization with several chapters nationally, was established to oppose Moms for Liberty. The group's founder said that Moms for Liberty is "so aggressive that people are kind of scared into silence" and described Defense of Democracy as "a group to fight back against Christian nationalism, that can give a voice to our teachers and our administrators and our librarians." Local groups of parents that have sprung up to oppose Moms for Liberty include Support Our Schools (in Sarasota, Florida) and Neighbors for Education (in Colorado).

Moms for Liberty endorses the works of prominent John Birch Society writer W. Cleon Skousen. The organization's claim of being grassroots and nonpartisan has been met with skepticism given that it has connected with other Republican groups and politicians.

In 2022, the Southern Poverty Law Center (SPLC), concluded in its annual Year in Hate & Extremism report that the organization "advances an anti-student inclusion agenda". SPLC officially labeled Moms for Liberty as being an "anti-government extremist" conservative group in 2023. In 2024, the group was referred to as the flagship of anti-student inclusion groups in their annual report, tracking the organization as an "Antigovernmental Group" that is part of the "antidemocratic hard-right". The SPLC called out the organizations efforts initiating book bans and dismantling diversity and inclusion programs and their court challenge to rollback protection for LGBTQ+ students by the Biden Administration's expansion of Title IX protections.

In January 2023, New Republic writer Melissa Gira Grant argued that the group uses "reality of disinvestment" in public libraries to argue for privatization of libraries, and is trying to "inject its agenda" into libraries. In July 2023, The Guardian argued that "Moms for Liberty pulls deeply from [an] established playbook of 'housewife populism'."

According to an analysis by the website Ballotpedia, which tracks elections, nearly 60 percent of the 198 school board candidates endorsed by Moms for Liberty in contested races across 10 states were defeated by December 2023.

== Reactions to sex scandal ==
Bridget Ziegler, one of the three founding members, admitted to having had a threesome with her husband and another woman. Allegations of rape and sexual assault were made by the same woman against Ziegler's husband, Christian Ziegler, in late November 2023. Christian had spoken at the organization's summit in Philadelphia that July. Responding to the allegations, Sarasota police obtained a video of the initial encounter between the three. Their subsequent investigation revealed a second video of the alleged sexual assault encounter retrieved from Christian's cell phone, and surveillance video showing him arriving at the residence of his alleged victim.

The Moms for Liberty Twitter account posted a message in support of Ziegler, dismissing the allegations as an attack on Ziegler's reputation, but deleted it soon after. Descovich and Justice later made a statement where they described themselves as "shaken" by the allegations and voiced support for the investigation, while giving a reminder that Ziegler had left the organization a month after its founding. The Moms for Liberty chapter in Northumberland County, Pennsylvania separated from the national organization after this news; the chapter chair mentioned being contacted by other Moms for Liberty members for advice on forming independent groups. Some writers, as well as other board members of Sarasota County Schools, accused Moms for Liberty and figures connected to the group of hypocrisy.

== Funding ==
The group is organized as a tax-exempt 501(c)(4) organization, and is not legally required to disclose its donors.

In late 2021, co-founder Tina Descovich claimed that Moms for Liberty was funded by individual $50 memberships and the sale of Moms for Liberty T-shirts, and said the organization had an annual budget of $300,000. Democrats have questioned how Moms for Liberty is funded, pointing out that its expansion came as Florida governor Ron DeSantis began his reelection campaign. According to a November 2021 analysis by Media Matters for America, Moms for Liberty benefits financially from American right-wing funding and ties to Republican political figures. Marie Rogerson was paid to do campaign work for Florida Republican Representative Randy Fine.

Moms for Liberty has received financial support from Conservatives for Good Government, a conservative Florida political action committee. The group also hosts fundraisers with conservative celebrities such as former Fox News host Megyn Kelly, and hosted a fundraiser in June 2021 that was sponsored by Florida Republicans running for office. In June 2022, Publix heiress Julie Fancelli donated $50,000 to the group's political action committee, which made up almost all the PAC's funding in 2022.

Sponsors of its annual summit, each of whom paid tens of thousands of dollars to the organization, include a variety of right-wing advocacy groups and companies, including the Leadership Institute, The Heritage Foundation, and Patriot Mobile.
