= List of mass shootings in the United States in 2026 =

Mass shootings in the contiguous United States in 2026
Mass shootings in Alaska in 2026
Mass shootings in Puerto Rico in 2026

This is a list of mass shootings that took place in the United States in 2026. Mass shootings are incidents in which several people are injured or killed due to firearm-related violence; specifically for the purposes of this article, this consists of a total of four or more victims. A total of 415 people have been killed and 1,746 people have been wounded in 405 shootings, as of October 31, 2026.

== Definitions ==
Several different inclusion criteria are used; there is no generally accepted definition. Gun Violence Archive, a nonprofit research group that tracks shootings and their characteristics in the United States, defines a mass shooting as an incident in which four or more people, excluding the perpetrator(s), are shot in one location at roughly the same time. The Congressional Research Service provides a definition of four or more killed. The Washington Post and Mother Jones use similar definitions, with the latter acknowledging that their definition "is a conservative measure of the problem", as many shootings with fewer fatalities occur. The crowdsourced Mass Shooting Tracker project applies the most expansive definition: four or more shot in any incident, including the perpetrator.

A 2019 study of mass shootings published in the journal Injury Epidemiology recommended developing "a standard definition that considers both fatalities and non-fatalities to most appropriately convey the burden of mass shootings on gun violence." The authors of the study further suggested that "the definition of mass shooting should be four or more people, excluding the shooter, who are shot in a single event regardless of the motive, setting or number of deaths."

Definitions generally exclude consideration of the number of persons targeted with lethal intent, perhaps with degraded accuracy from a greater distance, who escape injury from bullets or bullet spall, regardless of injury sustained while evading live gunfire, or medical complications resulting from those injuries (such as infection, concussion, stroke, or post-traumatic stress disorder) further down the road.

Definitions of the term "mass shooting"
Organization(s)	Definition
Mass Shooting Tracker	Four or more persons shot in one incident, at one location, at roughly the same time.
Gun Violence Archive Vox	Four or more shot in one incident, excluding the perpetrators, at one location, at roughly the same time.
Stanford University MSA Data Project	Three or more persons shot in one incident, excluding the perpetrator(s), at one location, at roughly the same time. Excluded are shootings associated with organized crime, gangs or drug wars.
ABC News	Four or more shot and killed in one incident, excluding the perpetrators, at one location, at roughly the same time.
Mother Jones	Three or more shot and killed in one incident at a public place, excluding the perpetrators. This list excludes all shootings the organization considers to be "conventionally motivated" such as all gang violence and armed robberies.
The Washington Post	Four or more shot and killed in one incident at a public place, excluding the perpetrators.
Congressional Research Service	Four or more shot and killed in one incident, excluding the perpetrators, at a public place, excluding gang-related killings and those done with a profit-motive.

Only incidents considered mass shootings by at least two of the above sources are listed below, provided that four victims were injured. Many incidents involving organized crime and gang violence are included. All definitions can be exceeded with a single shotgun blast into a target cluster at short range. Mass shootings do not require multiple gunshots.

Shootings that are reported as occurring in a home, at a party, or in an apartment complex with no other information given are considered non-public shootings and are excluded by some of the definitions above that state the shooting occurred "in a public place."

For statistical purposes, armed accomplices are likely to be classified as perpetrators, even if later analysis determines that the accomplice never discharged a firearm. Bystanders struck by bullets fired in self-defense by another bystander would potentially be classified as victims of a mass shooting, while a bystander firing in self-defense who injures or kills another bystander would almost certainly not be classified as a perpetrator. The classification of a bystander struck by police while attempting to stop the threat of an armed suspected-perpetrator falls into a gray zone.

== List ==
2026 date	Location	State or territory	Dead	Injured	Total	Description
November 22	Chicago (19)	Illinois	0	4	4	A woman and three teenagers were injured when shots were fired into a building where a party was taking place in the Englewood neighborhood.
November 21	Tulare County	California	0	9	9	Nine people were shot during a private concert in a suspected gang related attack east of Strathmore.
November 21	Parma	Ohio	3	1	4	Three people were killed and one injured in a shooting at an event venue. Two suspects were arrested.
November 19	Hillsborough County	Florida	5 (Note: Including the perpetrator or suspect)	0	5	A man killed his wife and three children, ages 1, 3, and 5, before killing himself at their home southeast of Plant City. Part of the shooting was heard over a 911 call, in which one of the children was heard begging his father not to kill him.
November 18	Baton Rouge (7)	Louisiana	0	4	4	Four people were shot shortly before midnight in the Mid City North area.
November 16	Alexandria	Louisiana	0	8	8	Eight people were wounded in a suspected targeted attack between two rival groups.
November 16	Baltimore (7)	Maryland	0	4	4	A suspected targeted shooting wounded four men in the Central Park Heights neighborhood.
November 15	Jackson (4)	Mississippi	3	1	4	Three people were killed and one person was injured when they were fired upon as they sat in a vehicle together outside a residence.
November 15	Covington County	Mississippi	0	4	4	A fight during a large gathering east of Collins escalated into a shooting that wounded four people.
November 13	Hueytown	Alabama	2	2	4	Four men were shot, two fatally, at a park.
November 12	Chatham County	North Carolina	0	4	4	Four juveniles were shot as a result of a physical altercation escalating into gunfire south of Chapel Hill.
November 12	Washington (3)	District of Columbia	2	5	7	2026 Logan Circle shooting: A man opened fire inside a gym in the Logan Circle neighborhood, killing another man before fleeing and shooting five others. After barricading himself inside his apartment, he fatally shot himself.
November 7	West Bend	Wisconsin	4	1	5	Two adults, two children, a dog were found dead inside a home as a result of a murder–suicide shooting. A girl survived with a gunshot injury.
November 5	Lakewood	Colorado	2	4	6	Police officers responding to a report of a suspicious person spotted a suspect from a hit-and-run earlier in the day boarding a Regional Transportation District bus. After approaching the suspect, the suspect opened fire, killing one officer and wounding three additional officers and a bystander before they were shot and killed.
November 3	Spokane County	Washington	5	1	6	A person opened fire at a home northeast of Spangle, killing two people and wounding a woman who ran to safety to a neighbor. The person then critically injured two responding police officers before dying. Both injured officers ultimately died from their injuries.
November 2	Moss Landing	California	2	2	4	A shooting along a road running alongside Moss Landing State Beach killed two people and injured two others.
November 1	Dallas (9)	Texas	0	7	7	A person fired into a crowd outside a convenience store in the Deep Ellum neighborhood, wounding seven people.
November 1	Madison	Illinois	1	3	4	After lights during a youth football game shut off at Madison Senior High School, people went onto the field and a fight broke out. During the incident, at least one person opened fire, killing one adult and injuring three others.
November 1	Iredell County	North Carolina	0	4	4	Four people were injured by gunfire during a Halloween party at an event center south of Mooresville.
November 1	Durham	North Carolina	0	4	4	Four juveniles were shot in a suspected drive-by shooting.
November 1	Nashville	Tennessee	0	4	4	A shooting during a Halloween party wounded four teenagers.
November 1	Jacksonville (7)	Florida	1	9	10	A shooting outside a house party killed a man and injured nine others, including a 15-year-old girl.
November 1	Fayetteville	Arkansas	0	6	6	Six people were injured after a fight escalated into a shooting during Halloween celebrations.
November 1	Bloomington	Illinois	1	7	8	A teenager was killed and seven people were injured in an early-morning shooting near the Illinois Wesleyan University campus.
November 1	Bloomington (2)	Indiana	0	7	7	Seven people were injured in an early-morning shooting near the Indiana University Bloomington campus.
October 31	Hidalgo County	Texas	0	7	7	A shooting at a birthday party southwest of Monte Alto left seven people injured.
October 31	Wichita (2)	Kansas	0	4	4	Four people were shot in west Wichita.
October 31	Newark	Delaware	0	6	6	At least six people were shot near the University of Delaware.
October 31	Sussex County	Delaware	1	8	9	A teenage girl was killed and eight other people injured in a shooting at a party near Ellendale.
October 31	Jackson (3)	Mississippi	2	6	8	Two people wearing ski masks entered a nightclub before one of them opened fire, killing two people and injuring six others.
October 31	Flint (3)	Michigan	1	3	4	A woman was killed and three people injured in a shooting at an early-morning house party.
October 31	Birmingham (2)	Alabama	1	8	9	Nine people were shot shortly after the end of the Magic City Classic football game at Legion Field.
October 30	Fairfield (2)	California	2	6	8	A shooting inside a Spirit Halloween store in Solano Town Center left eight people shot, one pregnant woman and an unborn baby fatally.
October 26	Elizabeth	New Jersey	1	4	5	A shooting during a candlelight vigil to honor a shooting victim killed one person and injured four others.
October 25	Pascua Yaqui Reservation	Arizona	0	4	4	Four people were shot at a house party.
October 25	Muncie	Indiana	0	5	5	Five people were shot in the parking lot of a business.
October 25	Charlotte (3)	North Carolina	2	2	4	A shooting killed two teenagers and left two other teenagers injured.
October 24	Memphis (5)	Tennessee	0	5	5	Five people were shot after an altercation outside an event center in the Oakhaven neighborhood. A man was arrested.
October 24	Tallahassee (2)	Florida	0	11	11	Eleven people were shot, including six children, near Bragg Memorial Stadium following a Florida A&M football game. A 12th person was injured while fleeing the scene.
October 18	Mundelein	Illinois	5	0	5	A man fatally shot his parents, his adult son, and girlfriend at his parent's home before killing himself.
October 18	Baltimore (6)	Maryland	2	3	5	Two people were killed and three others were injured when multiple people opened fire at a group in a BP gas station parking lot.
October 18	Harris County	Texas	1	3	4	Four people were shot, one fatally, after a fight broke out at a softball game and spilled out into the sports complex's parking lot south of Humble.
October 18	Philadelphia (8)	Pennsylvania	1	4	5	A man was killed and four other people were injured in a shooting inside a lounge in the Fairhill neighborhood.
October 18	Chicago (18)	Illinois	0	4	4	Four people were injured in a drive-by shooting in the Austin neighborhood.
October 17	Newberry	South Carolina	0	4	4	A shooting during a block party injured four people.
October 17	Eastvale	California	1	6	7	One person was killed and six others were struck in a residential neighborhood shooting.
October 17	Monroe	Georgia	0	4	4	Multiple people opened fire and struck four people.
October 16	Chicago (17)	Illinois	0	4	4	Four men were injured in a drive-by shooting in the Little Village neighborhood.
October 15	Baltimore (5)	Maryland	2	3	5	Two men were killed and three others, including two teenagers, were injured by gunfire in southeast Baltimore.
October 15	Bend	Oregon	5	2	7	2026 Silver Rail Elementary School shooting: A 16-year-old boy entered the school and opened fire, killing four people, including three children, and injuring at least two others. Later, a bystander fatally shot the gunman.
October 11	San Juan (2)	Puerto Rico	3	8	11	Three people were killed and eight injured in a shooting at a café in the Río Piedras neighborhood. Police said the shooting was sparked by an argument.
October 10	Little Rock (1)	Arkansas	2	3	5	Two people were killed and three others were injured in a shooting at a Circle K gas station.
October 10	Detroit (5)	Michigan	1	3	4	Multiple people are believed to have opened fire, killing a man and injuring three others, including two teenagers, in the Core City neighborhood.
October 9	Baltimore (4)	Maryland	2	2	4	A shooting killed two male teenagers and wounded two older men.
October 9	Douglas	Georgia	5	0	5	A man opened fire at a home, killing four family members, before killing himself.
October 9	Erie	Pennsylvania	10	0	10	2026 Erie shooting: A man opened fire at a home, killing nine people, including two children and an unborn baby, before dying from a self-inflicted gunshot wound when law enforcement arrived.
October 7	Meridianville	Alabama	0	4	4	Four juveniles were shot.
October 5	Portsmouth	Virginia	0	4	4	Four people were shot in the Park View neighborhood, and a suspect was taken into custody.
October 4	Albany	New York	1	3	4	Four teenagers were shot in the Pine Hills neighborhood, one fatally.
October 4	Dallas (8)	Texas	0	6	6	Six people were shot in the South Dallas area.
October 4	Vienna	Georgia	2	26	28	2026 Vienna, Georgia, shooting: Two people were killed and 42 more were injured at a shooting at a homecoming block party, of which 26 were injured by the gunfire. Multiple people were also struck by vehicles as people fled the shooting.
October 3	Commerce	Texas	0	6	6	Six people were shot during a party.
October 3	Trenton (3)	New Jersey	0	4	4	Four people were injured in a shooting at a home.
October 3	Baltimore (3)	Maryland	1	3	4	A 12-year-old girl was killed and three adults were injured at a park when two people opened fire at each other, allegedly over a dispute about a parking spot.
September 27	Cape Girardeau	Missouri	1	3	4	An altercation between two people escalated into a shooting that killed a juvenile and injured three adults.
September 27	Richland County	South Carolina	0	4	4	An overnight shooting at a nightclub in the Sandwood area left four people injured.
September 27	Polk County	Florida	0	4	4	Three women and one man were shot west of Crooked Lake Park.
September 27	Macon (2)	Georgia	0	12	12	Twelve teenagers were injured in a shootout at a park during a birthday party.
September 27	Detroit (4)	Michigan	3	4	7	Three men were shot and killed after an argument at an after-hours strip club. Four people were injured.
September 26	Blakely	Georgia	0	5	5	Five people were wounded by gunfire.
September 26	Anchorage (2)	Alaska	0	4	4	Four men were shot near a bar after closing.
September 26	Shreveport (4)	Louisiana	0	7	7	An overnight shooting at a house party, which escalated from an altercation, left seven people wounded.
September 26	Arlington	Virginia	0	5	5	Three women and two men were shot after an argument at a house party.
September 25	Floyd County	Georgia	0	4	4	A man was arrested for accidentally shooting four hunters in the Berry College Wildlife Management Area.
September 24	Hawthorne	California	0	4	4	An overnight shooting left four people wounded.
September 23	Macon (1)	Georgia	0	5	5	Five men were shot.
September 22	Mesa	Arizona	0	4	4	Three adults and a teenager were wounded by gunfire.
September 20	Fort Worth (3)	Texas	2	2	4	Two men were killed and two others were injured during a shooting triggered by an altercation at a gathering.
September 20	DeKalb County	Georgia	2	2	4	A fight outside an apartment complex near Stone Mountain during a barbecue resulted in two young brothers being fatally shot and two other family members being injured.
September 20	Greensboro (3)	North Carolina	1	4	5	One person was killed and four injured in an early-morning shooting outside of a nightclub.
September 19	Sanford	Florida	0	8	8	A shooting during a gathering at an intersection left eight people injured, two of them critically.
September 18	Bastrop	Louisiana	0	5	5	Five people were shot at the city's municipal center.
September 18	East St. Louis (2)	Illinois	1	3	4	Four people were shot, one fatally, at a nightclub.
September 16	Baltimore (2)	Maryland	0	7	7	Seven people, including a 3-year-old boy, were shot in central Baltimore.
September 15	Dayton (3)	Ohio	0	4	4	Four people, including a juvenile, were wounded by gunfire in a drive-by shooting. Another juvenile was injured, but not by gunfire.
September 13	Lago & San Benito	Texas	4	0	4	A man is accused of fatally shooting three people at a home in Lago and another at a home in outskirts of San Benito he previously lived with. Three children were inside the first house when the shooting happened, but were unharmed.
September 13	Dentsville	South Carolina	0	8	8	An overnight shooting at a nightclub injured eight people.
September 13	Chicago (16)	Illinois	1	6	7	An attack left six people injured and one person dead in Humboldt Park. One woman who was shot and injured while driving crashed her car into a CTA bus.
September 12	Tuscaloosa	Alabama	0	8	8	Eight people were wounded after a shooting at a block party. Multiple empty vehicles were also struck by gunfire.
September 12	Euclid	Ohio	1	3	4	Four teenagers were shot, one fatally.
September 12	Dallas (7)	Texas	1	5	6	Multiple suspects opened fire in the Oak Cliff neighborhood, killing a woman and injuring five others.
September 11	Louisville (4)	Kentucky	0	4	4	Four people, including a teenager, were shot in the Russell neighborhood.
September 10	Gaston County	North Carolina	2	2	4	A shooting inside a home south of Gastonia left two dead and two injured.
September 6	Taunton	Massachusetts	1	7	8	A shooting during a house party left one dead and seven wounded.
September 6	Sacramento (2)	California	0	4	4	Four people were shot near Sacramento State.
September 2	Minneapolis (7)	Minnesota	3	5	8	A man shot the mother of his child during a custody exchange outside the apartment building he lived in the Loring Park neighborhood before entering the building and shooting two employees and two residents, killing the two residents. Responding officers were fired upon by the gunman, and two officers were struck by gunfire and another suffered a non-gunshot injury. The gunman died in the exchange of gunfire.
September 1	Conway	South Carolina	0	5	5	Four people were struck by gunfire and a fifth was grazed by a bullet.
August 30	Baton Rouge (6)	Louisiana	1	3	4	Four people were shot in an overnight shooting. One victim later died from his wounds.
August 30	Trenton (2)	New Jersey	2	8	10	An overnight shooting left two dead and eight others injured.
August 29	Chicago (15)	Illinois	1	14	15	Fifteen people were shot, one of them fatally, in Washington Park.
August 29	Crest Hill	Illinois	2	2	4	Two teenagers were killed and two other teenagers were injured in a shooting.
August 29	Baton Rouge (5)	Louisiana	1	4	5	Five people were shot, one fatally, at an apartment.
August 29	Magee	Mississippi	1	3	4	Four people were shot, one fatally, in the northeast of the city not long after midnight.
August 28	Washington (2)	District of Columbia	1	3	4	A shooting in the Northeast Boundary neighborhood killed a man and injured three other men.
August 23	Yellowstone County	Montana	9	0	9	2026 Billings shooting: A man fatally shot eight of his relatives, including four children, during a family dinner at a home, and then set the home ablaze. The shooter was found dead from a self-inflicted gunshot wound in the back yard of the home.
August 23	Raleigh	North Carolina	0	4	4	Four people were injured in a shooting at a nightclub on Fayetteville Street. All victims sustained non-life-threatening injuries.
August 22	Washington County	Oregon	6	0	6	A man fatally shot his girlfriend, her mother, grandmother, and a family friend and their partner outside the mother's family home near Forest Grove, as well as five animals. After shooting the victims, the man set an SUV on fire that one of the victims was inside, and attempted to set the remaining bodies and the home on fire. The man was found dead inside his truck in Enumclaw, Washington, from a self-inflicted gunshot wound.
August 22	Bertie County	North Carolina	0	4	4	Four people were shot near Lewiston Woodville.
August 22	Eunice	Louisiana	2	3	5	Two people were killed and three others were injured in a shooting at a business.
August 21	Gadsden	Alabama	0	4	4	Four people were injured in a drive-by shooting at a Waffle House restaurant.
August 21	Detroit (3)	Michigan	0	4	4	Four people, including a 10-year-old child, were injured in a drive-by shooting in the Morningside neighborhood.
August 19	Corozal	Puerto Rico	1	4	5	A 20-year-old man was killed and four people injured in a shooting.
August 18	Wellston	Missouri	1	3	4	A shooting left one dead and three injured after an altercation escalated into gunfire.
August 17	Cleveland (5)	Ohio	2	2	4	Four people were shot, two of them fatally, in the Lee–Miles neighborhood.
August 16	Houston (6)	Texas	1	3	4	A drive-by shooting at a shopping center where a club had been rented out killed one person and injured three others. One other person was beaten.
August 16	Caguas	Puerto Rico	0	5	5	Four women and a man were shot at a business.
August 16	Cincinnati (4)	Ohio	0	4	4	Three adults and a child were shot in the North Avondale neighborhood.
August 16	Hancock County	Georgia	0	5	5	A shooting at a party left five injured near Sparta.
August 16	Hartford	Connecticut	1	4	5	A shooting in the South End neighborhood killed one person and injured four others.
August 15	Kansas City (7)	Missouri	0	4	4	A 5-year-old boy, a teenage girl, and two others were injured in a shooting in the city's East Side.
August 15	Lexington	Kentucky	1	4	5	One person was killed and four others were injured when a shooter opened fire in Charles Young Park. The attack was caught on a livestream.
August 15	Chicago (14)	Illinois	0	4	4	Multiple shooters shot four people in the Auburn Gresham neighborhood.
August 15	Denver (3)	Colorado	0	4	4	Four people, including a security guard, were shot in the Harvey Park neighborhood.
August 15	Ettrick	Virginia	0	5	5	Five people were shot outside a residence hall at Virginia State University. Police said there were multiple shooters.
August 15	Houston (5)	Texas	1	3	4	A gunman shot four people, killing one of them.
August 14	Missaukee County	Michigan	6	1	7	A man opened fire at three different locations in Missaukee County, killing five and injuring another before committing suicide.
August 14	Chicago (13)	Illinois	0	4	4	Four people were shot in the South Austin neighborhood.
August 11	Winfield	Kansas	6 (Note: Including the perpetrators or suspects)	0	6	A man killed his wife and their four children at a home before calling 911 and committing suicide. The Kansas Bureau of Investigation later said the mother was involved in planning the murder-suicide.
August 11	Wilmington (2)	Delaware	0	4	4	Four people were injured in an early morning shooting.
August 9	Mexia	Texas	0	4	4	Four people were shot during an unpermitted block party overnight. Officers were allegedly assaulted while attempting to render aid to one of the victims.
August 8–9	Sardis & Burke County	Georgia	5	1	6	A man shot and injured another man at an RV in Sardis before fleeing and fatally shooting four other people at two homes north of the city the following day. He was later tracked back down to the city where he engaged in a shootout with officers after deployed spike strips caused him to crash. Officers fatally shot him.
August 8	Bryan	Texas	1	3	4	Three teenagers, one of whom died, and an adult were shot after gunfire was exchanged between two groups during an overnight block party.
August 8	Memphis (4)	Tennessee	1	4	5	A fight at a party in the Douglass neighborhood resulted in shots being fired, killing a woman and injuring four others.
August 7	Tulsa	Oklahoma	0	4	4	A person is accused of shooting four people, at least one of whom was a teenager, following an argument.
August 4	Pensacola (2)	Florida	0	4	4	Four juveniles suffered minor injuries as they stood together outside an apartment complex after a single bullet was fired in their direction ricocheted and fragmented.
August 4	Atlanta (6)	Georgia	1	3	4	A shooting at an apartment complex in the Vine City neighborhood killed a man and wounded three others, including a teenager.
August 3	Wake County (2)	North Carolina	0	4	4	Four people, including a teenager, were shot at a short-term rental home south of Raleigh.
August 3	Oak Park	Michigan	2	2	4	Two teenagers were killed and two others were injured at a short-term rental home following a birthday party when shots were fired at the house as the occupants slept.
August 3	Boston (4)	Massachusetts	1	4	5	A shooting during a party in the Hyde Park neighborhood killed one person and injured four others.
August 2	Norfolk	Virginia	0	4	4	Four people were shot in the Berkely neighborhood.
August 2	Yonkers	New York	1	4	5	A man was killed and four teenagers were wounded when they shot at by a gunman as they stood on a street corner. The teenagers are believed to have been the intended target, while the man was believed to have been a bystander.
August 2	Greensboro (2)	North Carolina	0	9	9	Nine people, including four teenagers, were injured in what was believed to be a targeted attack at a banquet hall.
August 2	Rochester (2)	New York	1	5	6	A drive-by shooting targeting a crowd in a gas station parking lot killed a woman and injured five others, including three teenagers.
August 2	Huntsville	Alabama	1	4	5	A fight escalated into a shooting that killed a man and injured four others.
August 2	Portland	Oregon	1	5	6	A man was killed and five others, including a teenager, were wounded in a shooting at a home in the Cully neighborhood.
August 2	Dunn	North Carolina	2	2	4	A shooting at a bar during the early morning killed two people and injured two others, possibly as a result of an argument.
August 1	Jacksonville (6)	Florida	0	4	4	Four people were shot in two related shootings in close proximity to each other in the Duclay neighborhood.
August 1	Twin Falls	Idaho	4	7	11	2026 Twin Falls shooting: Three people were killed and seven others were injured when a man opened fire at an In-N-Out Burger restaurant before he died by suicide.
July 31	Rochester (1)	New York	1	3	4	As police officers tried to disperse crowds that had gathered following earlier the Puerto Rican Festival, gunshots were fired by an unknown suspect of suspect either at the crowd or in the crowd, killing a 14-year-old and injuring three other people.
July 30	Dayton (2)	Ohio	0	5	5	An argument between a man and a woman who had a previous relationship allegedly resulted in a physical confrontation that escalated into an exchange of gunfire, resulting in injuries to the woman and four bystanders. Only the man was charged in the incident.
July 27	Jacksonville (5)	Florida	1	3	4	A woman was killed and three men were injured in a shooting in Westside Jacksonville.
July 26	Seattle (4)	Washington	3 (Note: Including at least one of the perpetrators or suspects)	4	7	2026 Seattle Center shooting: Two people are believed to have exchanged gunfire with another person at the Bite of Seattle festival at the Seattle Center, resulting in the deaths of three people, including one of the alleged gunmen, and injuries to four others.
July 26	Memphis (3)	Tennessee	0	4	4	Four men were shot in the Hickory Hill neighborhood.
July 26	Robinson Township	Michigan	0	5	5	An argument during a party at the Bass River Recreation Area escalated into a shooting that wounded five people, including one juvenile.
July 26	Chicago (12)	Illinois	0	6	6	Six people were shot during a gathering in the Humboldt Park neighborhood.
July 25	St. Martinville	Louisiana	0	4	4	Three people are accused of shooting four people at a park.
July 25	North Charleston	South Carolina	1	3	4	A shooting during a party being held at an Airbnb killed one person and injured three people. Multiple nearby homes were also struck by gunfire.
July 25	Coyote	California	1	6	7	One person was killed and six people were injured when shots were fired during an unauthorized street party.
July 25	San Francisco	California	0	4	4	A group of people attempted to intervene in a fight between a man and a woman in the Union Square neighborhood and were allegedly shot by the man.
July 24	Grand Haven Charter Township	Michigan	8	0	8	Karolkiewicz family murders: A man shot his wife and their six children before setting their house on fire and fatally shooting himself southeast of Grand Haven.
July 22	Atlanta (5)	Georgia	0	4	4	A gunman walked into a business in the Bankhead neighborhood during a dispute between two groups and opened fire, injuring four people.
July 21	Dallas (6)	Texas	0	4	4	Four people were fired upon at an apartment complex in southeast Dallas and were grazed by bullets.
July 20	Denver (2)	Colorado	1	8	9	A man was killed and eight others were injured when a confrontation between two groups of people escalated into a shooting at a nightclub.
July 19	Madison County	Tennessee	3	9	12	Three people were killed and nine others injured in a gang-related shooting during a large gathering at park southwest of Jackson.
July 19	Baltimore (1)	Maryland	0	6	6	Six people were shot and injured in South Baltimore, including one critically.
July 19	Kansas City (6)	Missouri	0	4	4	Four people, including two teenagers, were shot at a park. Bullets fired during the incident also struck power equipment, knocking out local power for about an hour.
July 19	Asheville (2)	North Carolina	2	7	9	Two people were killed and seven others were injured in an overnight shooting.
July 19	Oklahoma City	Oklahoma	2	3	5	A fight broke out that escalated into gunfire during a party at a business, killing two people and injuring three others.
July 19	Minneapolis (6)	Minnesota	0	5	5	Five people were shot in the Stevens Square neighborhood.
July 19	Minneapolis (5)	Minnesota	0	9	9	A person opened fire on a large crowd outside a nightclub in the Uptown neighborhood after an altercation, injuring nine people.
July 19	Tucson	Arizona	0	10	10	A gunman opened fire into a crowded area downtown, injuring nine people, before being shot by a police officer.
July 18	Bear	Delaware	0	4	4	Four people, including three teenagers, were shot in the parking lot of a Waffle House restaurant after a large crowd had gathered there.
July 18	Rockford	Illinois	0	4	4	Four women were shot during a street party.
July 17	Detroit (2)	Michigan	0	5	5	A person allegedly opened fire outside a church as a result of an argument during a funeral, injuring four people, before they were shot and injured by police who were stationed across the street from the church.
July 16	Dallas (5)	Texas	0	4	4	Four people were injured by gunfire.
July 16	Shreveport (3)	Louisiana	1	3	4	A man is accused of pursuing a woman in a high speed chase and fatally shooting her, causing her to crash into another vehicle. The man whose vehicle was struck was killed in the crash. After allegedly shooting the woman, the man then allegedly opened fire at passing vehicles and people, injuring three people.
July 16	Chicago (11)	Illinois	1	3	4	Four men were shot, one fatally, in a drive-by shooting in the Washington Park neighborhood.
July 14	Louisville (3)	Kentucky	0	5	5	Five people were injured by gunfire in the Park Hill neighborhood when a confrontation in a park resulted in a shooting.
July 13	Philadelphia (7)	Pennsylvania	0	4	4	Four people were shot when a fight at a basketball court in the Elmwood Park neighborhood escalated into a shooting.
July 13	Northampton County & Nassawodox	Virginia	2	4	6	A man is accused of killing a family member near Nassawodox before heading to the town where he killed another person. The man is then accused of shooting and injuring three people on Lankford Highway, before returning to the original location where he was shot and injured by responding officers. One officer was struck in the bulletproof vest they were wearing during the exchange of gunfire.
July 12	Philadelphia (6)	Pennsylvania	1	4	5	A person was killed and four others were injured in a shooting outside of a Philadelphia Housing Authority complex in the Crescentville neighborhood.
July 12	East St. Louis (1)	Illinois	5	2	7	Two teenagers are accused of shooting and killing five and injuring two people at three different locations across East St. Louis. One of the suspects is also accused of cutting off the thumb of one of the victims. The suspects were identified as a 15-year-old relative of the victims and her 16-year-old boyfriend.
July 12	Philadelphia	Mississippi	1	3	4	A 19-year-old was killed and three others were injured when shots were fired inside a large crowd of people.
July 12	Florence County	South Carolina	1	3	4	Four people at a house party near Florence were shot, including a 17-year-old who was killed, when shots were exchanged between partygoers and the occupants of a pickup truck.
July 11	Anderson	Indiana	0	6	6	An altercation during a gathering led to a shooting that injured six people.
July 11	Shively	Kentucky	1	3	4	One person was killed and three others were injured in an early morning shooting.
July 10	Atlanta (4)	Georgia	1	3	4	Three teenagers and a bystander were shot outside an apartment in the Old Fourth Ward, with one of the teenagers being killed.
July 10	Lehigh Acres	Florida	0	4	4	Four people were shot and a search for multiple suspects ensued.
July 9	Savannah	Georgia	1	3	4	A shooting at an apartment complex killed one person and injured three others.
July 6	Seattle (3)	Washington	0	4	4	Four teenagers were shot during a house party in the Beacon Hill neighborhood.
July 6	Cleveland (4)	Ohio	1	3	4	A shooting in the Buckeye–Woodhill neighborhood killed a man and injured three others, including two teenage girls.
July 6	Providence	Rhode Island	0	5	5	A shooting during a "pop-up" party in an empty lot in an industrial area wounded five people.
July 6	Minneapolis (4)	Minnesota	0	4	4	A 17-year-old and three men were shot as they exited a building in the Sheridan neighborhood.
July 6	Chesapeake	Virginia	0	4	4	Three men and a boy were shot and multiple homes were struck by gunfire.
July 5	Carsonville	Missouri	2	2	4	An altercation at a MetroLink station led to four men being shot, two fatally.
July 5	Oildale	California	0	4	4	Four people, including a child, were shot.
July 5	East Los Angeles	California	0	4	4	A gathering to watch the Mexico national team play the England national team during the 2026 FIFA World Cup eventually devolved into a street takeover, during which shots were fired during a gang-related attack, wounding four people, including a child.
July 5	Rittman	Ohio	4	4	8	A man opened fire at the home of his ex-partner, killing her and her daughter. Responding police officers were then fired upon by the man, and a police officer was killed and four other officers and a police dog were injured. The shooter was also killed.
July 5	Boston (3)	Massachusetts	1	5	6	A shooting in the Roxbury neighborhood killed one person and injured five others.
July 5	Boston (2)	Massachusetts	1	3	4	One person was killed and three others were injured in a shooting in the Dorchester neighborhood.
July 5	Grand Rapids	Michigan	0	4	4	Four people, including a teenager, were shot during a block party in the southeast of the city.
July 5	Gary	Indiana	0	6	6	A shooting injured six people.
July 5	Aliquippa	Pennsylvania	0	4	4	Four people were shot.
July 5	Fort Wayne (2)	Indiana	1	8	9	One person was killed and eight others were injured in a shooting in the southeast of the city.
July 5	Chicago (10)	Illinois	0	6	6	Five teenagers and a man were shot in the West Garfield Park neighborhood.
July 5	Pensacola (1)	Florida	1	6	7	A shooting in downtown Pensacola killed a 19-year-old and injured six others, including at least one juvenile.
July 4	Compton	California	2	3	5	A shooting at an Independence Day party killed two people and injured three others.
July 4	South Miami Heights	Florida	2	2	4	Two men were killed and two others were injured in a shooting near Florida's Turnpike.
July 4	Mount Clemens	Michigan	0	5	5	Five people, including two juveniles, were shot during a block party.
July 4	San Antonio	Texas	1	5	6	An 18-year-old was killed and five others, including two children and a suspect, were wounded when multiple people opened fire outside a residence, striking people both inside and outside of it.
July 4	Hilton Head Island	South Carolina	0	7	7	Seven people were shot after a fight in the public beach access area of a park escalated into a shooting.
July 4	Dayton (1)	Ohio	0	4	4	Four people were shot in the Oregon Historic District as a result of an altercation.
July 4	New York City (4)	New York	0	8	8	Eight people, including four children, were shot in the Coney Island neighborhood of Brooklyn during a family barbecue taking place in a courtyard.
July 4	Radcliff	Kentucky	1	3	4	A shooting killed a person and injured three others.
July 4	Centreville	Mississippi	2	7	9	Two men were killed and seven others were injured in a shooting near a café.
July 2	Chicago (9)	Illinois	2	2	4	Two people were killed and two others were injured in a shooting at a gas station shortly after midnight in the Auburn Gresham neighborhood.
June 28	Carson	California	1	6	7	Shots fired during an illegal street takeover killed a man and injured six others.
June 27	Flint (2)	Michigan	0	4	4	Four women were shot during a block party.
June 27	Baton Rouge (4)	Louisiana	1	4	5	An argument escalated into a shooting that killed a man and injured four others.
June 27	Boston (1)	Massachusetts	1	4	5	A man was killed and four other men were injured in a shooting in the Mattapan neighborhood.
June 27	Marshall	Texas	2	2	4	Two people were killed and two others were injured in a shooting in the parking lot of a Whataburger restaurant.
June 26	Brockton	Massachusetts	0	4	4	Four people were shot during celebrations that followed a 2026 FIFA World Cup match between Cape Verde and Saudi Arabia.
June 25	Houston (4)	Texas	0	4	4	Four people, including a minor, were allegedly shot over an argument about putting trash in the courtyard of an apartment building while moving out in the Fifth Ward.
June 23	The Acreage	Florida	1	3	4	A man allegedly shot and killed his grandfather and injured three other family members with a shotgun as a result of an argument.
June 21	Philadelphia (5)	Pennsylvania	2	2	4	A shooting outside a bar in the Fairhill neighborhood left two men dead and two others injured.
June 21	New York City (3)	New York	0	4	4	Two teenagers and two men were shot in the Harlem neighborhood of Manhattan.
June 21	Dallas (4)	Texas	0	5	5	An argument escalated into a shooting which injured five people.
June 21	Petersburg (2)	Virginia	0	5	5	Five people were shot at a restaurant in Old Towne Petersburg.
June 20	Montgomery (2)	Alabama	2	2	4	Two men were killed and two others were injured in connected shootings in east Montgomery.
June 20	Hanover	Maryland	0	6	6	Six people, including two juveniles, were shot overnight.
June 19	Milwaukee (2)	Wisconsin	0	4	4	Four people, including a 16-year-old, were injured in a shooting at a McDonald's restaurant.
June 19	Kansas City (5)	Missouri	1	5	6	A man was killed and five injured in a shooting near a Juneteenth celebration.
June 19	Chicago (8)	Illinois	0	12	12	12 people were injured in a drive-by shooting in the Princeton Park section of the Roseland neighborhood.
June 17	Amarillo (4)	Texas	0	6	6	Six people were injured in a suspected gang-related shooting at an apartment complex.
June 17	Baton Rouge (3)	Louisiana	0	5	5	An 11-year-old and four teenagers were shot during a drive-by shooting outside an apartment.
June 16	Kansas City (4)	Missouri	1	4	5	One person was killed and four others were injured in a series of suspected connected shootings along Interstate 670, Interstate 70, and Truman Road. The suspect in the shootings escaped after a standoff in Independence which led to a house fire and the death of five dogs.
June 15	Redan	Georgia	0	5	5	Five people were shot during a teen house party.
June 14	Holmes County	Mississippi	0	4	4	Four people were shot at an apartment complex south of Lexington.
June 14	St. Andrews	South Carolina	1	7	8	One person was killed and seven others were injured in a shooting at a restaurant.
June 13	Crockett	Texas	0	4	4	Four people were injured by gunfire. Two additional people were also struck by vehicles as a result of the incident.
June 13	Jacksonville (4)	Florida	0	4	4	Four people, including a 16-year-old boy, were injured by gunfire during a pop up party in the Sherwood Forest neighborhood.
June 12	Midland	Texas	2	10	12	A man wanted by police for opening fire at a police officer two days earlier opened fire at passerby, drivers, and police officers before barricading himself inside an abandoned veterinary clinic and beginning a stand-off with police. The man died from a self-inflicted gunshot wound, and one person was killed and ten others were injured in the attack.
June 11	Cleveland (3)	Ohio	0	5	5	Five people, including two teenagers, were shot in the east side.
June 9	Trenton (1)	New Jersey	0	7	7	Seven people, including two teenagers, were injured by gunfire in the South Trenton neighborhood.
June 9	Livonia	Michigan	4	0	4	A man allegedly killed his parents, brother, and girlfriend at a home.
June 8	Denmark	South Carolina	2	2	4	Two men were killed and two others were injured during a home invasion at an apartment complex.
June 8	Chicago (7)	Illinois	1	3	4	A man was killed and three others were injured in a drive-by shooting in the Austin neighborhood.
June 7	Cleveland (2)	Ohio	0	5	5	Five people in the Buckeye–Woodhill neighborhood were shot while playing a card game.
June 6	Jackson (2)	Mississippi	1	5	6	An 18-year-old woman was killed and five others were injured when shots were fired during a trail ride.
June 6	Fort Worth (2)	Texas	0	4	4	Four people, including a child and a police officer, were injured by gunfire during a community event being hosted at a park.
June 6	Chicago (6)	Illinois	0	4	4	Four boys between the ages of 12 and 14 were injured by gunfire in the Bronzeville neighborhood.
June 6	Kansas City (3)	Missouri	0	9	9	Nine people were struck by gunfire on Troost Avenue.
June 6	Toledo	Ohio	0	12	12	2026 Old West End Festival shooting: Twelve people were injured, two critically, in a shooting near the Old West End Festival when two people exchanged gunfire. One of the suspects allegedly shot himself while exchanging gunfire with another suspect.
June 6	Phoenix (2)	Arizona	0	4	4	Four men were shot overnight in west Phoenix.
June 5	Chicago (5)	Illinois	2	5	7	Two people were killed and five others were injured when two suspects opened fire at a group of people in the Back of the Yards neighborhood.
June 4	Birmingham (1)	Alabama	2	5	7	Two people were killed and five others were injured when gunfire broke out during a gathering in West Birmingham.
June 3	Fairfield (1)	California	1	3	4	An 18-year-old was killed and three people were injured in a shooting in the parking lot of Fairfield High School during a high school graduation ceremony.
June 1	Cheektowaga & Buffalo	New York	4	0	4	A man is accused of killing a woman and two children at a home in Cheektowaga and a man at a deli in Buffalo in the Black Rock neighborhood.
June 1	Shreveport (2)	Louisiana	0	4	4	An argument resulted in a shooting that wounded four people.
June 1	Muscatine	Iowa	7	0	7	Six people were killed in a series of shootings at two residences and a business before the shooter died from a self-inflicted gunshot wound. Investigators said the shootings stemmed from a domestic dispute.
May 31	Sandy	Oregon	3	1	4	A man is accused of killing his wife, mother-in-law, and a 16-year-old at an apartment complex and taking two hostages. When officers arrived on scene, the man allegedly opened fire on them, wounding one officer.
May 30	Petersburg (1)	Virginia	0	5	5	Four adults and a child were shot at an apartment complex.
May 30	Visalia	California	1	3	4	A man was killed and three others were injured when a shooting at a graduation party broke out.
May 28	Berkeley	Missouri	1	3	4	A man was killed and three people were injured when a person opened fire during a birthday party being hosted lakeside of Ramona Lake. An injured victim crashed while attempting to drive herself to the hospital and one person drove into the lake while attempting to flee the gunfire.
May 26	Cincinnati (3)	Ohio	0	4	4	Four people were shot in the Northside neighborhood.
May 26	Dallas (3)	Texas	3	1	4	Three people were killed and another person was injured in a shooting at a short-term rental in West Dallas.
May 25	Philadelphia (4)	Pennsylvania	0	4	4	Four people, including a 16-year-old boy, were struck by gunfire during a party being hosted inside a garage in the Olney neighborhood.
May 24	Juana Díaz	Puerto Rico	2	2	4	Four people were shot outside of a pharmacy.
May 24	Loíza	Puerto Rico	3	2	5	Five people were shot in the Medianía Alta neighborhood.
May 24	Thibodaux	Louisiana	0	7	7	Seven people were injured by gunfire outside a nightclub.
May 24	St. Louis County	Missouri	0	6	6	Six people, including at least one juvenile, were wounded when at least one person opened fire into a crowd east of Florissant. Two people also suffered non-gunshot injuries.
May 24	Chicago (4)	Illinois	0	4	4	Four teenagers were injured by gunfire in the Little Village neighborhood.
May 24	Louisville (2)	Kentucky	0	5	5	Five women were shot at a motorcycle club in the Jacobs neighborhood. Another woman suffered a non-gunshot injury as a result of the shooting.
May 23	Philadelphia (3)	Pennsylvania	1	4	5	Five people were shot, one fatally, in the Poplar neighborhood.
May 18	Mobile (2)	Alabama	1	4	5	A shooting at a home in the Baltimore neighborhood killed a man and injured four others.
May 17	Homestead & West Homestead	Pennsylvania	0	4	4	Four people were injured in a shooting across two blocks.
May 16	Wichita (1)	Kansas	0	4	4	Four people were struck by gunfire when people arrived at a house party and opened fire.
May 16	Atlanta (3)	Georgia	0	4	4	Four people were shot when a group of people allegedly opened fire on them in the South Downtown neighborhood.
May 15	St. Louis (3)	Missouri	2	3	5	One man was killed and three other men were injured in a shooting in the Carr Square neighborhood. Police pursued a vehicle which fled the scene, and after stopping the vehicle on McKinley Bridge, a woman with a fatal gunshot wound was discovered inside and two men inside were detained.
May 12	Philadelphia (2)	Pennsylvania	0	4	4	Four people were injured in a shooting in the Parkside neighborhood.
May 10	Paterson (2)	New Jersey	2	4	6	A drive-by shooting outside a liquor store killed two men and injured four others.
May 9	Fruitport Charter Township	Michigan	0	4	4	Four people were struck by gunfire and two others were injured after being struck by vehicles after two people opened fire at each other outside a hall where a post-prom party was being held east of Norton Shores.
May 9	Jackson	Michigan	0	4	4	Two men and women were shot after a fight escalated into a shooting.
May 9	Lake Charles	Louisiana	0	4	4	Four people, including at least one juvenile, were shot.
May 9	Reddick	Florida	0	5	5	Five people were shot during a house party.
May 8	Brownsville	Tennessee	1	6	7	A shooting during a pre-prom photo session at a park killed a student and injured six others.
May 7	Cleveland (1)	Ohio	0	4	4	Two men and two women were shot in Union–Miles Park across the street from the John Adams College and Career Academy.
May 6	Austin (3)	Texas	1	4	5	A shooting at a restaurant killed a man and injured four others.
May 5	Ouachita Parish	Louisiana	1	4	5	One person was killed and four others, including a suspect, when a person opened fire into a crowd of people south of Monroe after a fight broke out.
May 5	Dallas (2)	Texas	0	5	5	Five people were shot in the Deep Ellum neighborhood.
May 5	Carrollton	Texas	2	3	5	A male employee was killed and three others were injured in a shooting at a Korean market parking lot during a business meeting. The suspect later traveled four miles away to an apartment complex where he fatally shot another man.
May 4	Memphis (2)	Tennessee	0	7	7	Seven people were shot after a gunman opened fire during an argument at an Orange Mound motorcycle club.
May 3	Kern County	California	1	3	4	A shooting near Bakersfield killed one teenager and injured three other juveniles.
May 3	Lowndes County	Georgia	1	3	4	An employee of a gas station south of Valdosta allegedly opened fire at his place of work at other employees, killing a man and injuring three others.
May 3	Edmond	Oklahoma	1	22	23	A woman was killed and 22 others were injured by gunfire at a park near Arcadia Lake after a fight broke out during a party that was being held there.
May 2	Amarillo (3)	Texas	2	10	12	Two people were killed and ten others injured in a shooting at an apartment complex.
May 1	Minneapolis (3)	Minnesota	0	4	4	Four people were shot at Martin Luther King Jr. Park in the King Field neighborhood.
April 28	Albany	Georgia	1	5	6	A man is accused of shooting into a group of people, killing a woman and injuring four others, before shooting into a car with a man, a woman, and a child inside and injuring the man and causing a crash before fleeing from police and sparking a manhunt.
April 27	Columbia	Maryland	1	6	7	A shooting during an illegal car rally killed a man and injured six others.
April 26	Austin (2)	Texas	0	6	6	Six people were struck by gunfire after a fight between two men in the parking lot of a restaurant in the Blackland neighborhood escalated.
April 26	Parks Township	Pennsylvania	1	3	4	A fight in the parking lot of a bar north of Vandergrift resulted in a suspect opening fire and killing a woman and injuring three others.
April 26	New York City (2)	New York	0	4	4	Four men were shot inside a nightclub in the Elmhurst neighborhood of Queens.
April 26	Bloomington (1)	Indiana	0	5	5	Five people, including two teenagers, were injured in a shooting near Indiana University Bloomington during the Little 500 weekend.
April 23	Lansing	Michigan	0	6	6	Six people, including two young girls, were injured in a shooting in downtown Lansing.
April 23	Baton Rouge (2)	Louisiana	1	5	6	An argument between two groups at the food court in the Mall of Louisiana escalated into a shootout, resulting in the deaths of one person and injuries to five others. Five people were later arrested.
April 22	Chicago (3)	Illinois	1	3	4	A shooting in the Little Village neighborhood killed a man and injured three women.
April 22	Wake County (1)	North Carolina	1	4	5	A man was killed and four others were injured following a party in a field near Zebulon.
April 20	Anchorage (1)	Alaska	0	5	5	Five people were shot in east Anchorage.
April 20	Winston-Salem	North Carolina	2	5	7	A planned fight between two teenage girls at Leinbach Park resulted in a fight breaking out in a crowd that had gathered around the planned fight, and in the commotion two teenage boys opened fire on each other and others in the crowd. Two people were killed, including one of the gunmen, and five others were injured, including one of the suspects.
April 19	Temperanceville	Virginia	1	4	5	A shooting at a bar left one man dead and four others, including a suspect, injured. As emergency medical services arrived on scene and got out of an ambulance, they were fired upon by a gunman, who was then arrested.
April 19	Centralia	Illinois	1	3	4	A suspected targeted shooting left a man dead and three others injured.
April 19	Iowa City	Iowa	0	5	5	Five people were injured in a shooting following a fight in downtown Iowa City. Three of the injured were students at the University of Iowa.
April 19	Shreveport (1)	Louisiana	9	2	11	2026 Shreveport shooting: Eight children were killed and two women were injured in a domestic-related shooting. Two children were injured after jumping from a rooftop. The suspect carjacked a vehicle and fled to Bossier City later that day, where police fatally shot him.
April 18	Jefferson County	Mississippi	0	4	4	Four people were shot during a dog fight in the area of Union Church. The sheriff reported that the shooting was not reported until around 12 hours after the shooting took place.
April 18	Danville	Virginia	1	4	5	A shooting at a home left a man dead and four others injured.
April 18	Paterson (1)	New Jersey	1	3	4	A 20-year-old man was killed and three others were injured in a shooting near a birthday party.
April 18	Arden-Arcade	California	0	4	4	As officers attempted to clear a park where they had broke up a fight, a shooting broke out and resulted in injuries to four people. No officers were struck by gunfire or discharged their weapons.
April 18	Maricopa County	Arizona	0	4	4	Four juveniles were struck by gunfire during a house party north of Litchfield Park.
April 18	Phoenix (1)	Arizona	0	5	5	A shooting injured five people, including two minors.
April 17	Chicago (2)	Illinois	3	1	4	A drive-by shooting killed three people and left a man injured in the West Garfield Park neighborhood.
April 15	Warner Robins	Georgia	0	4	4	Four people were injured by bullet fragments, one seriously, when a gun inside the pocket of a customer discharged inside a Kroger store as they reached for something they were carrying in the same pocket.
April 14	St. Louis (2)	Missouri	1	3	4	A shooting outside a market in the JeffVanderLou neighborhood killed one man and injured three other men.
April 12	Rosemead	California	0	4	4	Four people, including a teenager, were shot during a street takeover.
April 11	Virginia Beach (3)	Virginia	0	8	8	An altercation between two groups in the Virginia Beach Oceanfront resulted in at least three people opening fire, injuring eight people, including one of the suspects.
April 11	Fort Wayne (1)	Indiana	1	4	5	A shooting in the area of the Pontiac Place and Greater McMillen Park neighborhoods killed one person and injured four others.
April 11	Fort Worth (1)	Texas	0	5	5	An argument during a family gathering in the Glen Park neighborhood resulted in a person opening fire and injuring five people.
April 11	Humphreys County	Mississippi	1	5	6	One person was killed and five others were injured in a shooting near Belzoni.
April 11	Union Township	New Jersey	1	6	7	One person was killed and six others were injured in a shooting inside a Chick-fil-A restaurant.
April 6	Monticello	Mississippi	0	4	4	Four people were injured by gunfire at a Sonic restaurant.
April 5	Ocilla	Georgia	1	3	4	A shooting during a block party killed a man and injured three others.
April 5	Atlanta (2)	Georgia	0	4	4	Four teenagers were shot during a block party in the Oakland City neighborhood when a dispute between adults escalated into a shooting.
April 3	Power County	Idaho	3	2	5	Two people were killed and two others were injured in a shooting northwest of Pocatello. The suspect was shot and killed by law enforcement after being found hiding near Portneuf River after brandishing a weapon towards responding officers.
April 1	Los Angeles (3)	California	0	4	4	Four people were shot at a strip mall in the South Park neighborhood.
March 30	Philadelphia (1)	Pennsylvania	2	3	5	Two people were killed and three others were injured in a shooting in the Cobbs Creek neighborhood.
March 29	Winnfield	Louisiana	0	4	4	Four people were injured when at least two people opened fire at a civic center.
March 29	Pulaski County	Arkansas	0	4	4	An altercation outside a nightclub led to a shooting which injured four people south of Little Rock.
March 29	Meridian	Idaho	0	4	4	Four men were shot as a result of an argument.
March 29	Tallahassee (1)	Florida	0	4	4	Four people were shot near the campus of Florida A&M University in the Bond Westside neighborhood, causing the school to advise students in the area to shelter in place.
March 29	Dickinson	Texas	0	7	7	Seven people were shot at a lounge rented out for a birthday party.
March 28	Houston (3)	Texas	0	6	6	Six men were shot during a house party in the Acres Home neighborhood.
March 28	Río Grande	Puerto Rico	2	4	6	Two men were killed and four others injured outside a business when an argument escalated into a shooting.
March 25	Sacramento (1)	California	0	4	4	Four people, including a 4-year-old, were injured when shots were fired in the Oak Park neighborhood. One of the victims was struck while inside a home, and was not connected to the other three victims.
March 24	Wilmington (1)	Delaware	2	2	4	A shooting killed two men and injured two others.
March 23	Dillon	South Carolina	2	2	4	Two connected shootings a short distance from each other in Dillon killed two men and injured two others.
March 23	Virginia Beach (2)	Virginia	0	7	7	Seven people were shot during a car meet at a shopping mall.
March 22	Greensboro (1)	North Carolina	0	4	4	Four people were injured by gunfire in Downtown Greensboro.
March 22	Charlotte (2)	North Carolina	1	4	5	One person was killed and four others were injured in a shooting at a party in the Davis Lake - Eastfield neighborhood.
March 22	Smith County	Texas	2	2	4	Two men were killed and two women were injured in a shooting at a nightclub west of Tyler.
March 22	Steelton	Pennsylvania	1	3	4	One person was killed and three others were injured in a shooting at a lounge.
March 22	Potter County & Amarillo (2)	Texas	5	4	9	A man opened fire at a business north of Amarillo during an apparent attempted robbery, killing two people before escaping police. The man then drove to a home in Amarillo where a disturbance had been reported earlier and rammed his vehicle into the home before getting out and opening fire, killing one person and injuring five others before he was killed in a shootout with responding officers. A man wounded in the house shooting later died of his injuries.
March 22	Amarillo (1)	Texas	2	3	5	An argument at a home escalated into a domestic violence shooting, resulting in the deaths of two people and injuries to three others.
March 22	South Valley	New Mexico	0	5	5	A shooting during a house party injured four adults and a juvenile.
March 22	Normal	Illinois	0	6	6	Six people, including two juveniles, were injured in a shooting at a gathering.
March 22	Liberty County	Georgia	0	4	4	Four teenagers were injured in a shooting west of Midway.
March 22	Clovis	New Mexico	2	4	6	A shooting shortly after midnight killed a woman and injured five others. A 17-year-old wounded in the shooting died of her injuries nearly two weeks later.
March 21	Lawton	Oklahoma	1	3	4	A shooting at a bar killed one person and injured three others.
March 21	St. Louis (1)	Missouri	2	3	5	An argument outside a smoke shop in the Columbus Square neighborhood escalated when the store owner opened fire on another man, who then returned fire and killed him. The man who returned fire was critically injured, and unable to use his legs when an employee of the store exited and fatally shot him. Three other people were injured in the incident.
March 21	Milwaukee (1)	Wisconsin	1	4	5	A shooting believed to have stemmed from an argument resulted in the death of one person and injuries to four others in the Town & Country Manor neighborhood.
March 20	Minneapolis (2)	Minnesota	0	4	4	Four teenagers were shot as they left a Popeyes in the Whittier neighborhood.
March 16	Riviera Beach	Florida	2	3	5	A fight at an apartment complex resulted in a man allegedly opening fire, striking multiple people, before fleeing and attempting multiple carjackings, resulting in more shootings. In total, one person was killed and four others were injured. A second person died of his injuries nearly a week later.
March 14	Minneapolis (1)	Minnesota	0	4	4	A dispute between two groups in the Jordan neighborhood resulted in a shooting which injured four people.
March 14	Port Aransas	Texas	0	5	5	An altercation between two groups on Port Aransas' beach resulted in at least one person opening fire, wounding five people.
March 9	Cherry Hill	Virginia	1	4	5	A confrontation between two groups at a basketball court escalated into a shooting that killed a man and injured four others, including three teenage boys.
March 8	Asheville (1)	North Carolina	0	7	7	Nine people were injured, seven by gunfire, in downtown Asheville.
March 8	New York City (1)	New York	0	4	4	Four people were struck by gunfire when a shooter fired into a bar in the Canarsie neighborhood of Brooklyn.
March 7	Osceola	Arkansas	1	3	4	One person was killed and three others were injured in a shooting at a restaurant.
March 7	Virginia Beach (1)	Virginia	0	6	6	Six bystanders were injured when two people opened fire on each other before fleeing.
March 7	Oakland	California	2	5	7	Several people in a bar in downtown Oakland drew guns on each other and opened fire, killing two people and injuring five others. All of the casualties are believed to have been bystanders.
March 6	Selma	Alabama	0	6	6	Six people were injured in a shooting.
March 5	South Apopka	Florida	0	4	4	Four men were shot south of Apopka. No suspects were arrested.
March 3	San Juan (1)	Puerto Rico	1	5	6	A group of individuals attempted to enter a nightclub in the Santurce barrio, but were told by security that they could not enter with their firearms. After an argument, the men and the security guards got into a shoot-out. One of the armed men was killed and another injured, and three security guards were injured. A bystander was also injured.
March 1	Marshalltown	Iowa	1	3	4	One person was killed and three others were injured in a targeted shooting at a home.
March 1	Austin (1)	Texas	4	15	19	2026 Austin bar shooting: A man opened fire on West Sixth Street, firing into a bar and at people in the surrounding area, killing three people and injuring 15 others. The shooter was killed by responding police officers.
March 1	Cincinnati (2)	Ohio	0	9	9	Nine people were injured in a shooting at a music venue in the East End.
February 28	Anaheim	California	0	4	4	Four alleged gang members are accused of firing into a crowd at a baby shower, targeting rival gang members, and injuring three juveniles and an adult.
February 28	San Carlos	Texas	4	2	6	Officers responded to a road rage incident between neighbors, but left after none of the individuals involved wanted to cooperate. Sometime afterwards, the dispute escalated into a shooting that killed four people and injured two others.
February 28	Palm Springs	California	2	3	5	A shooting at a motorcycle club gathering stemming from an argument killed two people and injured three others.
February 27	Detroit (1)	Michigan	2	2	4	An argument in the parking lot of an event center in the Nortown neighborhood hosting a funeral repast escalated into a shooting that killed a man and a woman and injured two others.
February 25	Chicago (1)	Illinois	0	5	5	Five men were shot in the Greater Grand Crossing area of Chicago's South Side.
February 23	Christian County & Stone County	Missouri	3	2	5	A man fatally shot a Christian County sheriff's deputy during a traffic stop near Highlandville before fleeing and abandoning his vehicle near Reeds Spring. The man was detected by heat signature in a wooded area via helicopter, and engaged in a shootout with responding officers, killing another Christian County sheriff's deputy and injuring two more officers before he was killed.
February 22	Jacksonville (3)	Florida	0	4	4	Four people were shot in the Eastside neighborhood during a gathering to remember local rapper Lil Poppa, who died by suicide four days earlier in Atlanta.
February 21	Kansas City (2)	Missouri	1	5	6	A fight outside a home in the Town Fork Creek neighborhood resulted in a shooting which killed a 16-year-old boy and injured five others.
February 21	Jacksonville Beach	Florida	0	4	4	One minor and three adults were injured in a shooting during a fight at a sideshow near a music festival.
February 21	Richmond	Virginia	2	7	9	A shooting in Shockoe Bottom stemming from "a large commotion" killed two people and injured seven others.
February 19	Flint (1)	Michigan	0	4	4	Three men and a woman were injured in a drive-by shooting in a residential area.
February 18	Atlanta (1)	Georgia	0	4	4	Four men were shot inside a high rise apartment in Midtown Atlanta as a result of a suspected robbery during a drug sale.
February 16	Pawtucket	Rhode Island	4	2	6	2026 Pawtucket shooting: A woman shot five of her family members, killing her ex-wife and their adult son, and leaving three injured, at an ice rink hosting a high school hockey game. The shooter died from a self-inflicted gunshot wound after another person intervened. The ex-wife's father died from his injuries nine days after the shooting.
February 15	New Orleans (2)	Louisiana	1	3	4	A shooting in a park in the Village de L'Est neighborhood killed one person and injured three others.
February 15	Waverly	Michigan	1	3	4	A person drove a vehicle into a family and then opened fire on them, killing a child and injuring three adults, including a bystander who intervened.
February 15	Mobile (1)	Alabama	0	7	7	A shooting in downtown Mobile left seven people injured, including one in critical condition.
February 15	Charlotte (1)	North Carolina	0	4	4	A shooting in the Silverwood neighborhood wounded four teenagers.
February 15	Orlando	Florida	0	4	4	Four juveniles were shot in the Parramore neighborhood as a result of an altercation.
February 15	Kansas City (1)	Missouri	2	2	4	An altercation inside a bar-nightclub in the Westside South neighborhood escalated into a shooting that killed two women and two others.
February 15	Cincinnati (1)	Ohio	2	2	4	Four people were shot following an altercation outside a bar in the Northside neighborhood. All four victims were transported to hospitals, where two died.
February 12	Tangipahoa Parish	Louisiana	1	4	5	An argument over a request for a car ride at an apartment southwest of Hammond escalated when a man allegedly opened fire into a crowd, wounding three people, including a 4-year-old boy, and killing a man who returned fire and injured the suspect.
February 10	Fort Lauderdale & Bee Ridge	Florida	7	0	7	A man shot and killed a former romantic partner and her son in Fort Lauderdale before driving approximately 200 miles northwest to the home of her parents in a gated community in Bee Ridge. The man entered the home and killed her mother, brother, and a family friend inside. After the initial shooting at the home, her father arrived at the home and was fatally shot in the front lawn before the shooter died by suicide.
February 9	Auburn	Washington	0	4	4	Four people were shot inside an apartment at a supportive housing center for homeless young adults.
February 8	San Jose	California	0	5	5	A shooting in Downtown San Jose near the site of a recently concluded Super Bowl LX watch party wounded five people.
February 8	Jacksonville (2)	Florida	0	4	4	Four people were shot overnight at a shopping center in the Paxon neighborhood.
February 7	Seth Ward	Texas	5	0	5	A shooting at a home northeast of Plainview left five people dead, including the suspect.
February 4	Jacksonville (1)	Florida	0	4	4	A shooting during a fight in the Magnolia Gardens neighborhood wounded three women and a teenage girl.
February 4	Los Angeles (2)	California	0	4	4	Three women and a man were shot as they stood outside in a residential area in the Broadway-Manchester neighborhood.
February 3	Salinas	Puerto Rico	0	4	4	A woman and three minors were injured after a person in another vehicle shot at them while they were driving on the highway. The teenage driver was uninjured.
February 1	Concord	North Carolina	2	2	4	A shooting at an apartment left two men dead and two others injured.
February 1	Indianapolis (2)	Indiana	2	2	4	Two men were killed and another man and a woman were injured in a shooting in the Near Southeast neighborhood.
February 1	Seattle (2)	Washington	1	3	4	A shooting in a parking lot in the Pioneer Square neighborhood left a man dead and three others injured after a fight escalated.
January 31	Houston (2)	Texas	1	5	6	An altercation broke out in a strip mall and multiple people began shooting at each other, with police and hundreds of people present; a 20-year old man died and five others were injured.
January 31	Clinton	Louisiana	0	5	5	Five people, including a six-year-old, were shot in front of a courthouse during a Mardi Gras parade.
January 30	Springfield	Ohio	0	4	4	A shooting injured four people.
January 29	Flat Rock	North Carolina	2	2	4	A shooting in a residential area east of Mount Airy left two dead and two injured.
January 24	Carver	Massachusetts	2	2	4	Four people were shot, two fatally, in a targeted attack during a child's birthday party.
January 23	Gwinnett County	Georgia	4	0	4	A couple traveled to the home of their relatives southwest of Lawrenceville where the husband opened fire, killing his wife and three of his relatives. The couple's child and two children who lived at the home were unharmed.
January 22	Washington (1)	District of Columbia	0	5	5	An argument on a bus in Northwest D.C. escalated into a shooting that injured five people, including two juveniles.
January 18	Baton Rouge (1)	Louisiana	0	4	4	An overnight shooting left four people injured.
January 17	Seattle (1)	Washington	1	3	4	A shooting in a parking lot in the Chinatown–International District left one person dead and three others injured.
January 16	New Orleans (1)	Louisiana	1	3	4	A man being chased by a shooter ran into Dooky Chase's Restaurant in the Tremé neighborhood, where in the foyer the shooter fatally shot him and injured three women.
January 11	Adams County	Colorado	1	3	4	A shooting at a home north of Strasburg left one man dead and three others injured.
January 11	Los Angeles (1)	California	1	4	5	A man was killed and four others were injured when two men opened fire on them as they queued for food at a Louisiana Famous Fried Chicken restaurant in the Manchester Square neighborhood.
January 11	Lithia Springs	Georgia	1	3	4	One person was killed and three others, including a security guard, were injured in a shooting at a bar.
January 11	Slaton	Texas	3	2	5	A shooting killed three people, including the shooter, and injured two others.
January 11	Newton	Texas	1	3	4	A shooting killed a woman on her birthday and wounded three men.
January 9	Clay County	Mississippi	6	0	6	A man is accused of opening fire at three different locations in the area of Cedarbluff, killing four family members, including a 7-year-old girl, and a church pastor and the pastor's brother at a residence at a church.
January 7	Salt Lake City	Utah	2	6	8	An altercation outside a Mormon meetinghouse during a funeral escalated into a shooting that killed two people and left six others injured, resulting in a manhunt for the suspect or suspects.
January 6	Montgomery (1)	Alabama	0	4	4	Four men were shot in south Montgomery.
January 4	Hamblen County	Tennessee	2	2	4	Four teenagers were shot, two fatally, at a short-term rental southwest of Morristown.
January 4	Louisville (1)	Kentucky	0	4	4	Four people, including a 17-year-old, were shot inside a private lounge in the Klondike neighborhood.
January 3	Denver (1)	Colorado	2	2	4	A 16-year-old boy was killed and three others were injured when an argument during a party celebrating the capture of Venezuelan president Nicolás Maduro escalated into a shooting in the Hampden neighborhood. Another victim later succumbed to his injuries on January 16.
January 3	Indianapolis (1)	Indiana	2	2	4	A shooting at an apartment complex in the Arlington Woods neighborhood killed two people and left two others critically injured, including a juvenile.
January 2	Memphis (1)	Tennessee	0	4	4	Three teenagers and a man were shot at a duplex in the High Point Terrace neighborhood.
January 1	Jackson (1)	Mississippi	0	4	4	Four people were shot outside of a nightclub after a fight escalated.
January 1	Dallas (1)	Texas	1	4	5	Five people were shot and injured, including one critically, during an altercation outside of a strip club in Love Field. A local rapper died of his injuries on January 5.
January 1	Houston (1)	Texas	0	5	5	Five people were shot at a short-term rental home in the Third Ward of Houston during a New Year's Day party.

== Monthly statistics ==
Note that statistics are only updated at the very end of each month. The current month's statistics will therefore be blank.

2026 US mass shooting statistics by month
Month	Mass shootings	Total number dead (including the shooter/s)	Total number wounded (including the shooter/s)	Occurred at a school or university	Occurred at a place of worship	Total days without mass shootings
January	26	32	85	0	2	13
February	31	46	105	0	0	10
March	41	37	187	0	0	13
April	36	32	152	0	0	12
May	37	29	170	0	0	9
June	44	39	202	1	0	7
July	68	59	305	0	0	8
August	51	67	196	1	0	11
September	33	23	157	1	0	12
October	40	54	202	2	0	15
November	—N/a	—N/a	—N/a	—N/a	—N/a	—N/a
December	—N/a	—N/a	—N/a	—N/a	—N/a	—N/a
Total	405	415	1,755	5	2	110
