= Sydney Gruters =

American politician

- Gruters in 2026

Member-elect of the U.S. House of Representatives from Florida's 16th district
- Assuming office January 3, 2027
- Succeeding: Vern Buchanan

Personal details
- Born: Sydney Beebe Spence; September 1981 (age 45) Florida, U.S.
- Party: Republican
- Spouse: Joe Gruters
- Children: 3
- Education: University of Florida (BA)

Sydney Beebe Gruters (née Spence; born September 1981) is an American politician who is the U.S. representative-elect for Florida's 16th congressional district.

== Early life and career ==
Born in September 1981 in Florida, she is a graduate of the University of Florida.

Gruters served as the Operations Director for U.S. representative Vern Buchanan for ten years and additionally served as District Director for U.S. representative Greg Steube. In 2017, Gruters was appointed by U.S. President Donald Trump to serve as state director in the United States Department of Agriculture for Florida and the U.S. Virgin Islands. Gruters served as an executive director for the New College of Florida foundation.

== Personal life ==
Gruters is married to Chair of the Republican National Committee and Florida State Senator Joe Gruters. She has three children.

U.S. House of Representatives
Preceded by Vern Buchanan	Member of the U.S. House of Representatives from Florida's 16th congressional district Taking office 2027	Elect
