= Bridget Ziegler =

American politician (born 1982)

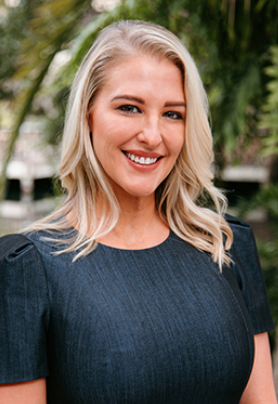
- Ziegler in 2022
- Born: July 23, 1982 (age 44); Schaumburg, Illinois, U.S.
- Political party: Republican; Democratic (previously)
- Spouse: Christian Ziegler
- Children: 3
- Website: bridgetziegler.com

Bridget Anne Ziegler (née McGrath; born July 23, 1982) is an American former politician who served on the school board for Sarasota County, Florida from 2014 until 2026. She is a conservative education activist and a co-founder of Moms for Liberty.

== Early life and career ==
Bridget McGrath was born in Schaumburg, Illinois, to Eileen Marie and Kevin Norman McGrath as the youngest of three children, and raised in Wheaton, Illinois, and Fort Gratiot, Michigan. She attended classes at two junior colleges and a state university, but left to begin selling handbags and, later, insurance. She became politically active after marrying Republican politician Christian Ziegler. She changed her political affiliation from registered Democrat to Republican after she began dating him around 2010.

In June 2014, Governor Rick Scott appointed Ziegler to fill a vacancy on the Sarasota County School Board. She was elected to a four-year term in November 2014 and reelected in 2018 and 2022. Her candidacy was endorsed by Governor Ron DeSantis.

Ziegler co-founded Moms for Liberty in 2021, but left the organization later that year. When the Southern Poverty Law Center labeled Moms for Liberty as an "anti-government extremist group", Ziegler described the label as "reckless".

Following the 2022 election, the Sarasota County School Board shifted from a 3–2 liberal-leaning majority to a 4–1 conservative super-majority and several controversies ensued.

In September 2022, Ziegler accepted a position with the Leadership Institute. In December 2023, at their request, she resigned from the Leadership Institute because of details she revealed during an investigation into allegations of sexual assault by her husband that were made by a woman who had engaged in a three-way sexual relationship with the Zieglers.

== Political positions ==
Ziegler has criticized Black Lives Matter "and how it was taught in schools", according to Bloomberg, "and she has promoted unscientific ideas around trends in trans youth". During the COVID-19 pandemic, Ziegler advocated against mask mandates in Sarasota County schools. Ziegler has fought against the teaching of critical race theory and LGBTQ inclusivity.

Alongside her husband, Ziegler has been held as an example of increasing political tension and polarization. Ziegler was a major backer of the controversial Parental Rights in Education Act. The law builds on the 2021 "Parents' Bill of Rights", which Ziegler helped draft in 2019. As a result of the DeSantis feud with Disney, Ziegler was appointed by DeSantis to the board of the Central Florida Tourism Oversight District created to take oversight of the district away from Disney.

In December 2023, Ziegler's husband was investigated regarding allegations that he had raped a woman in her apartment in October 2023. The accuser stated that while they had planned a threesome, Bridget Ziegler was unable to attend. Christian Ziegler allegedly showed up anyway and assaulted her. The Zieglers admitted to previously having a consensual encounter with the accuser. Christian Ziegler was later cleared of the allegation.

The Sarasota County School Board called upon Ziegler to resign in a 4-to-1 non-binding vote, with Ziegler as the only vote against the resolution. Ziegler additionally refused to resign. Only DeSantis, acting in his capacity as governor of Florida, was capable of removing her. Ziegler remained in office, and did not run for reelection in 2026.

== Personal life ==
Ziegler moved to Sarasota, Florida, in 2010, where her parents had retired. She is married to Christian Ziegler. They have three children.

A Sarasota police investigation following an accusation of rape and sexual assault against Christian Ziegler that was filed during October 2023 by a participant in a threesome that included both Zieglers, was reported by media across the country on November 30, 2023. When questioned, Bridget Ziegler admitted to the threesome sexual relationship involving her husband and another woman. On December 22, news reports stated that police had recovered a sex tape of Ziegler and an unnamed woman. On January 19, the Sarasota police said that they had closed their investigation of sexual assault charges against Christian, but the charge of having made a video of their sexual encounter without permission from his sexual partner remained. The state attorney did not proceed with an indictment, stating that the evidence was not conclusive enough to expect a successful prosecution.

In May 2024, the Zieglers sought to prevent the release of records from the investigation. In September 2026, a Florida appeals court ruled that the records were subject to public disclosure.
