= Lago, Texas =

- Census-designated place
- Coordinates: 26°5′17″N 97°36′46″W
- Country: United States
- State: Texas
- County: Cameron

Area
  - Total: 0.046 sq mi (0.12 km^{2})
  - Land: 0.046 sq mi (0.12 km^{2})
  - Water: 0 sq mi (0.0 km^{2})
- Elevation: 39 ft (12 m)

Population (2020)
  - Total: 161
  - Density: 3,500/sq mi (1,300/km^{2})
- Time zone: UTC-6 (Central (CST))
  - Summer (DST): UTC-5 (CDT)
- FIPS code: 48-40258
- GNIS feature ID: 1852718

Lago is a census-designated place (CDP) in Cameron County, Texas, United States. As of the 2020 census, Lago had a population of 161. It is part of the Brownsville–Harlingen Metropolitan Statistical Area.

== Geography ==
Lago is located west of the center of Cameron County at 26°5′17″N 97°36′46″W (26.087960, -97.612821). It is 4 miles (6 km) south of San Benito and 18 miles (29 km) northwest of the center of Brownsville.

According to the United States Census Bureau, the CDP has a total area of 0.05 square miles (0.12 km^{2}), of which 98,890 square feet (9,187 m^{2}), or 6.99%, is water.

== Demographics ==
Historical population
Census	Pop.	Note	%±
2000	246		—
2010	204		−17.1%
2020	161		−21.1%
U.S. Decennial Census; 1850–1900 1910; 1920 1930 1940; 1950 1960 1970; 1980 1990 2000; 2010 2020

Lago first appeared as a census designated place in the 2000 U.S. census.

=== 2020 census ===
Lago CDP, Texas – Racial and ethnic composition Note: the US Census treats Hispanic/Latino as an ethnic category. This table excludes Latinos from the racial categories and assigns them to a separate category. Hispanics/Latinos may be of any race.
Race / Ethnicity (NH = Non-Hispanic)	Pop 2000	Pop 2010	Pop 2020	% 2000	% 2010	% 2020
White alone (NH)	1	0	6	0.41%	0.00%	3.73%
Black or African American alone (NH)	0	0	0	0.00%	0.00%	0.00%
Native American or Alaska Native alone (NH)	0	0	0	0.00%	0.00%	0.00%
Asian alone (NH)	0	0	0	0.00%	0.00%	0.00%
Native Hawaiian or Pacific Islander alone (NH)	0	0	0	0.00%	0.00%	0.00%
Other race alone (NH)	0	0	0	0.00%	0.00%	0.00%
Mixed race or Multiracial (NH)	0	0	6	0.00%	0.00%	3.73%
Hispanic or Latino (any race)	245	204	149	99.59%	100.00%	92.55%
Total	246	204	161	100.00%	100.00%	100.00%

As of the 2020 census, there were 161 people, 51 housing units, and 40 families. There were 52 White people, 1 Native American, 48 people from some other race, and 60 people from two or more races. 149 people were of Hispanic or Latino origin.

The median age was 66.2 years old. 75.6% of the population were older than 65. 9.3% of the population spoke English at home, and 90.7% spoke Spanish at home. 32.6% of the population were foreign born, with 78.6% of those being US citizens, and 21.4% being not a US citizen.

=== 2000 census ===
At the 2000 census there were 246 people, 56 households, and 53 families in the CDP. The population density was 5,718.7 inhabitants per square mile (2,208.0/km^{2}). There were 57 housing units at an average density of 1,325.1 per square mile (511.6/km^{2}). The racial makeup of the CDP was 8.54% White, 91.46% from other races. Hispanic or Latino of any race were 99.59%.

Of the 56 households 50.0% had children under the age of 18 living with them, 78.6% were married couples living together, 14.3% had a female householder with no husband present, and 3.6% were non-families. 3.6% of households were one person and 3.6% were one person aged 65 or older. The average household size was 4.39 and the average family size was 4.44.

The age distribution was 37.0% under the age of 18, 9.8% from 18 to 24, 26.0% from 25 to 44, 19.1% from 45 to 64, and 8.1% 65 or older. The median age was 26 years. For every 100 females, there were 90.7 males. For every 100 females age 18 and over, there were 82.4 males.

The median income for a household in the CDP was $18,235, and the median family income was $18,235. Males had a median income of $30,568 versus $6,250 for females. The per capita income for the CDP was $3,346. About 54.3% of families and 70.1% of the population were below the poverty line, including 83.5% of those under the age of 18 and none of those 65 or over.

== Education ==
Lago is served by the San Benito Consolidated Independent School District.

In addition, South Texas Independent School District operates magnet schools that serve the community.
