= 2026 Erie shooting =

Familicide in Pennsylvania, US

- Doorbell footage of two victims of the shooting running to another house
- Location: 42.1349°N 80.0644°W; 722 Perry St; Erie, Pennsylvania, US
- Date: October 9, 2026 c. 4:52 p.m. – 4:55 p.m. (EDT; UTC−04:00)
- Attack type: Mass shooting; mass murder; murder-suicide; familicide
- Weapon: .40 caliber handgun
- Deaths: 10 (including the perpetrator and an unborn baby)
- Perpetrator: Matthew Stone Sr.
- Motive: Under investigation

On October 9, 2026, a mass shooting occurred at a home in Erie, Pennsylvania, United States. The perpetrator, 45-year-old Matthew Stone Sr., a father to three of the victims, killed nine people, including an unborn baby, before he committed suicide.

== Shooting ==
At around 4:52 p.m. EDT, police responded to a ShotSpotter report at a home at 7th and Perry Streets, and discovered two women with fatal gunshot wounds, who had sought help with neighbors before the suspect came outside the home and shot them both. The situation developed with police and tactical teams surrounding the home, with officers using their patrol cars to make announcements into the house, and SWAT and hostage negotiation teams arriving during the response. No gunshots were fired after law enforcement arrived. Officers deployed a drone to assess the house at 5:39 p.m., and at 7:12 p.m., SWAT officers breached the front and rear doors of the home, which were barricaded. Officers deployed flash bangs during the breach, which were initially believed to be gunfire.

Two children, 5-year-old Isiah Hodges and 22-month-old Amari'anna, were found on the first floor of the home, and four adult victims were found in a second floor stairwell, including Stone's wife, Michelle, and his children, Matthew Jr., Jonathan, and Angelina, who was eight months pregnant. Stone was found dead with a self-inflicted gunshot wound on the second floor of the home, with a .40-caliber handgun.

== Victims ==
Eight of the victims were related to Stone or part of his family, and the final victim was a family friend. They were Stone's wife, 44-year-old Michelle Stone, his two sons, 21-year-old Matthew Stone Jr. and 19-year-old Jonathan Stone, his daughter, 24-year-old Angelina Stone, who was eight months pregnant with a boy she named Kyrie, his sister, 37-year-old Lora Roberts, Roberts' friend and neighbor 51-year-old Twila Tanner, and his two grandchildren, 5-year-old Isiah Hodges, and 22-month-old Amari'anna.

Investigators concluded that all of the deaths occurred before law enforcement arrived at the scene, and no gunshots were fired inside the home after they arrived.

== Investigation ==
The perpetrator was identified as 45-year-old Matthew Stone Sr. (May 6, 1981 – October 9, 2026), the family patriarch and the father to three of the victims and grandfather to two victims.

Investigators found that Stone had become increasingly more "controlling" of his family leading up to the shooting. According to his family, he controlled the family's finances and limited when family members could leave the house. Erie Bureau Police Chief Rick Lorah said detectives described the house as "extremely filthy"; 2-liter bottles of urine were found all over the house, and the home did not have a functioning shower, toilet, or kitchen sink. Drug paraphernalia was also found in the house.

In 2019, Stone had threatened his wife, Michelle, with a .40-caliber handgun, which was the same handgun used in the shooting. Stone was initially charged for the incident, but Michelle changed her statement, and the charges were dropped.

== Aftermath ==
On October 14, the Blighted Property Review Committee voted in favor of declaring the house where the shooting took place as blighted, giving the home's owner 30 days to fix the issues or dispute the designation. According to the executive director of the Erie Redevelopment Authority, Aaron Snippert, the house had been deemed uninhabitable in 2025 due to raw sewage being found in the residence. On October 28, the house was demolished by the Erie Redevelopment Authority after they obtained the property from Matthew Stone Sr.'s sister, who owned the property.

== See also ==
- Crime in Pennsylvania
- List of mass shootings in the United States in 2026
