= Christian Ziegler (politician) =

American politician (born 1983)

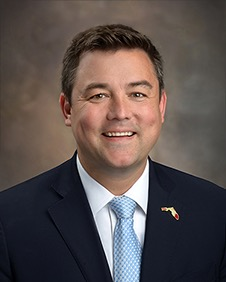
- Ziegler in 2018

Chair of the Florida Republican Party
- In office February 12, 2023 – January 8, 2024; Duties stripped December 17, 2023*
- Preceded by: Joe Gruters
- Succeeded by: Evan Power

Personal details
- Born: 1983 (age 42–43) North Georgia, U.S.
- Party: Republican
- Spouse: Bridget Ziegler
- Education: Florida State University (BA)
- *All duties were delegated to Evan Power.

Christian Michael Ziegler (born 1983) is an American former politician from Florida. He was the chairman of the Florida Republican Party from February 12, 2023, to January 8, 2024, when he was removed from office by the party.

== Early life ==
Ziegler was born in North Georgia, outside of Atlanta in May 1983.

== Career ==
Ziegler graduated from Florida State University in 2005 and worked for Vern Buchanan's campaign for the U.S. House of Representatives in the 2006 elections. After Buchanan won his seat, Ziegler worked for him as a legislative aide.

In 2012, Ziegler ran for a position on the Republican Party of Florida's state committee, representing Sarasota County. He ran for chairman of the state party in 2017, but lost the election to incumbent Blaise Ingoglia. In November 2018, he was elected to the county commission of Sarasota County. In early 2019, he was endorsed by Corey Lewandowski for the vice-chairmanship of the state Republican party. Ziegler occupied that office from 2019 to 2023. On January 6, 2021, Ziegler attended the "Save America" rally that preceded the attack on the United States Capitol. Ziegler did not run for re-election to the county commission in 2022. He was elected chairman of the Republican Party of Florida in February 2023.

=== Allegations of sexual assault ===
Sarasota police initiated an investigation into Christian Ziegler following an accusation of rape and sexual assault made against him in October 2023 by a woman who took part in a threesome a year prior with both Christian and his wife Bridget. When questioned, Bridget Ziegler admitted to being involved in the threesome sexual relationship including her husband and the woman as noted in the police report.

The 911 tape that led to the investigation was released, with the 911 caller reporting that she wanted a wellness check on the victim who she described as a friend. The 911 caller stated that she was worried about the victim who had said she was raped and was afraid to leave the house and stated that she could not go on.

According to a police report, Christian Ziegler admitted taking part in the sex act, as well as recording it secretly, which would be prosecutable if the alleged victim had not consented to such filming. Ziegler claimed to be innocent of the charge of assault and declared the report as an "attack" against him, and said that he was the victim being targeted. In a subsequent telephone call, it was revealed he had tried to apologize to the woman filing the rape claim, offered her money to resolve the issue, and reassured her that Bridget would be joining them for any subsequent ménage à trois. By January 8, 2024, the investigation had been expanded to include the retrieved video recording, as video voyeurism.

On March 6, 2024, the state attorney's office in Sarasota announced it would not pursue criminal charges against Ziegler due to insufficient evidence.

=== Suspension and removal from office ===
Due to the allegations, every statewide elected official and the state legislature's presiding officers (all Republicans) called on Ziegler to resign, but he refused. On December 17, 2023, the executive committee of the Florida Republican Party met in Orlando and censured Ziegler, stripped him of his duties (delegating them to the vice-chairman, Evan Power), lowered his annual salary to $1, and scheduled an emergency meeting in Tallahassee for January 8, 2024 for the full party to vote on his removal if he did not resign before then.

Ziegler was removed as chairman of the Florida Republican Party on January 8, 2024, by a vote of 199-3. He did not appear for the vote. Evan Power was selected to replace him.

=== Lawsuit to suppress public records ===
In May 2024, the Zieglers sought to prevent the release of records from the investigation. In September 2026, a Florida appeals court ruled that the records were subject to public disclosure.

== Personal life ==
Ziegler's wife, Bridget, co-founded Moms for Liberty. Ziegler has been associated with Donald Trump supporters in Florida Republican circles, such as Joe Gruters and Rick Scott, and the Zieglers have been featured in news stories as friends of Ron DeSantis.

Party political offices
| Preceded by Joe Gruters | Chair of the Florida Republican Party; 2023–2024 | Succeeded by Evan Power |
