= Melissa Gira Grant =

American journalist (born 1978)

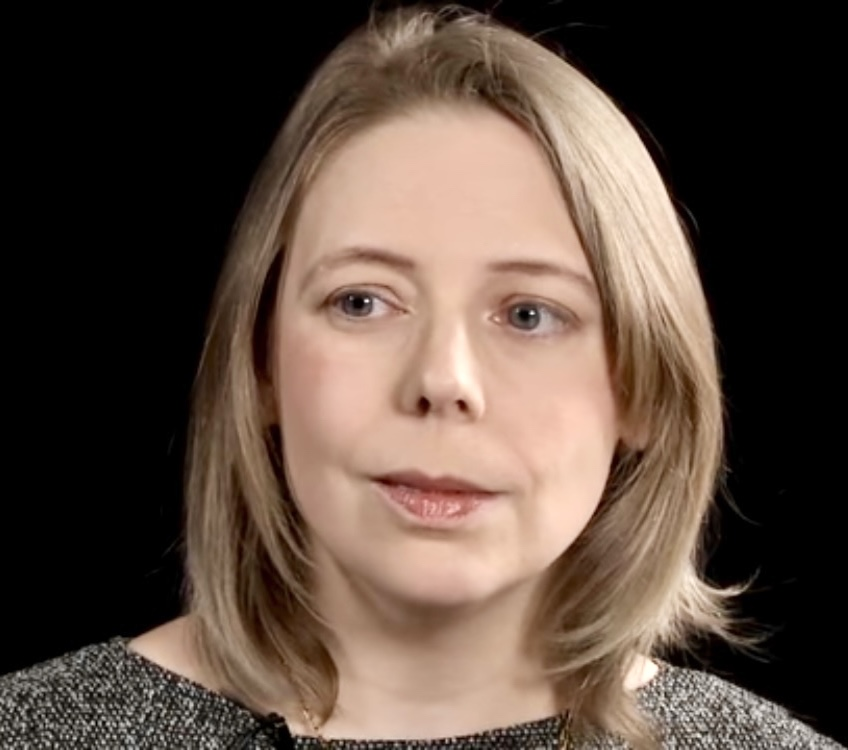
- Grant on The Laura Flanders Show in 2014
- Born: Melissa Grant; 1978 (age 47–48); Boston, Massachusetts, U.S.
- Education: University of Massachusetts Amherst; San Francisco State University
- Occupation: Writer

Melissa Gira Grant (born 1978) is an American journalist. She is a staff writer at The New Republic and the author of Playing the Whore (Verso, 2014), and co-editor of the ebook Coming and Crying (Glass Houses, 2010).

== Early life ==
Melissa Gira Grant was born in Boston, Massachusetts. She attended the University of Massachusetts Amherst and at San Francisco State University.

== Career ==
Grant is a former sex worker who began sex work to pay for being a writer.

Grant was a member of the Exotic Dancers Union and a board member at the Lusty Lady Theater in San Francisco. Grant worked at St. James Infirmary Clinic in San Francisco from 2006 to 2009. Later she was on the staff of Third Wave Foundation, a social justice and feminist foundation in New York.

=== Writing ===
Grant’s writing covers the intersection of sex, politics, and technology. She is the author of Playing the Whore (2014) published by Verso and a staff writer at The New Republic. She previously worked as a contributing writer for Pacific Standard, Village Voice, a reporter at Valleywag and a contributing editor at Jacobin. Grant also has written for the Appeal, the Nation, Pacific Standard, the Village Voice, the Atlantic, Wired, the Guardian, Reason, Glamour, Slate, Jezebel, Rhizome, AlterNet, In These Times, Valleywag and $pread.

== Publications ==
As editor

- O'Connell, Meaghan; Grant, Melissa Gira, eds. (2010). Coming and Crying. Glass Houses Press. ISBN 978-0615384948.

As author

- Playing the Whore: The Work of Sex Work. Verso. 2014. ISBN 978-1781683231.
