= Community Development Journal =

- Discipline: Community development
- Language: English
- Edited by: Kirsty Lohman and Ruth Pearce

Publication details
- Publisher: Oxford University Press (United Kingdom)
- Impact factor: 1.5 (2022)

Standard abbreviations
- ISO 4: Community Dev. J.

Indexing
- ISSN: 0010-3802 (print); 1468-2656 (web)

Links
- Journal homepage

The Community Development Journal is a peer reviewed academic journal of community development. It is published in the United Kingdom by Oxford University Press.

== History ==
The journal was first published in 1966, following the dissolution of two British newsletters, the Community Development Bulletin and the Community Development Review. Its first editor was Peter du Sautoy, a lecturer at the University of Manchester and former director of social welfare and community development in Ghana. He initially founded an all-male editorial board compromised primarily of individuals who had formerly worked in British colonies.

A struggle over the identity of the journal took place in the 1970s, as former colonial figures were gradually replaced on the editorial board by community workers and lecturers with experience of urban community development in the United Kingdom. From this time, the journal set out to operate as a more international publication, with increasing contributions from Global South, and the establishment of an International Advisory Board.

In 2015 the journal held a 50th Anniversary Conference in Edinburgh, with participants attending from across the world. The event included a reception hosted by the International Association for Community Development, and a keynote address by Marjorie Mayo.

== Abstracting, indexing, and impact factor ==
According to the Journal Citation Reports, the journal had an impact factor of 1.5 for 2022, ranking it 34th out of 41 in the category of Development Studies.

It is indexed in the following bibliographic databases:

- Applied Social Sciences Index & Abstracts (ASSIA)
- CAB Abstracts
- CSA Worldwide Political Science Abstracts
- Education Research Abstracts
- Forest Products Abstracts
- Forestry Abstracts
- MLA International Bibliography
- Sage Family Studies Abstracts

== Former editors ==
- Peter du Sautoy (1966–1967)
- Majorie du Sautoy (1967–1970)
- Brian Taylor (1971–1981)
- Gary Craig (1982–1997)
- Keith Popple (1998–2002)
- Chris Miller (2003–2010)
- Mick Carpenter (2010–2015)
- Mae Shaw and Keith Popple (2016–2017)
- Órla O'Donovan and Rosie R Meade (2017–2022)
