= Joe Gruters =

American politician (born 1977)

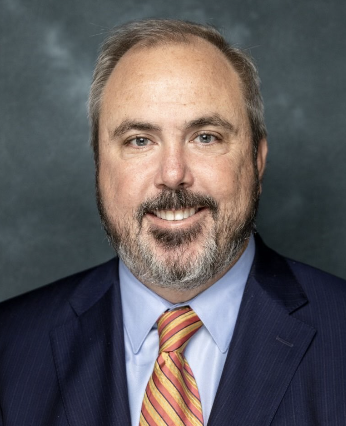
- Official portrait, 2025

67th Chair of the Republican National Committee
- Incumbent
- Assumed office August 22, 2025
- Preceded by: Michael Whatley

Member of the Florida Senate
- Incumbent
- Assumed office November 6, 2018
- Preceded by: Greg Steube
- Constituency: 23rd district (2018–2022); 22nd district (2022–present)

Treasurer of the Republican National Committee
- In office January 17, 2025 – August 22, 2025
- Preceded by: KC Crosbie
- Succeeded by: Jennifer Rich

Chair of the Florida Republican Party
- In office January 12, 2019 – February 12, 2023
- Preceded by: Blaise Ingoglia
- Succeeded by: Christian Ziegler

Member of the Florida House of Representatives from the 73rd district
- In office November 8, 2016 – November 6, 2018
- Preceded by: Greg Steube
- Succeeded by: Tommy Gregory

Personal details
- Born: Joseph Ryan Gruters; July 6, 1977 (age 49) Tampa, Florida, U.S.
- Party: Republican
- Spouse: Sydney Gruters
- Children: 3
- Education: Florida State University (BS); University of South Florida (MBA)

Joseph Ryan Gruters (born July 6, 1977) is an American politician and accountant serving as chair of the Republican National Committee (RNC) since 2025, formerly its treasurer. In 2023, Trump appointed Gruters to manage the dark money he receives and to keep the amounts and donors anonymous to the public and the IRS. In 2025, President Donald Trump appointed him to the United States Homeland Security Council that is run by Stephen Miller.

He is a Republican and from 2019 to 2023, Gruters was the chair of the Florida Republican Party. From 2016 to 2018, he served in the Florida House of Representatives. He has been a member of the Florida Senate since 2018.

== Early life and education ==
Gruters was born on July 6, 1977, in Tampa, Florida. Gruters graduated from Cardinal Mooney High School in Sarasota. He received a B.S. degree from Florida State University, where he was a member of Theta Chi fraternity. He later received an M.B.A. degree from the University of South Florida.

== Political career ==
In early political activities, Gruters lost in his first two election campaigns and worked behind the scenes on several more losing campaigns. He joined Vern Buchanan’s original successful 2006 campaign for Congress. Gruters subsequently was chairman of the Republican Party of Sarasota for ten years.

Gruters became an early supporter of Rick Scott during his successful 2010 campaign for governor of Florida. That support earned Gruters an appointment by the governor to the Florida State University board of trustees. In 2015, he became vice chairman of the Republican Party of Florida (RPOF) and had strong political backers when he ran for a Florida House of Representatives seat in 2016.

=== Beneficial relationship with Trump ===
Gruters also is one of Donald Trump's closest political allies in Florida. An early Trump supporter, Gruters was Florida co-chairman of Trump's 2016 campaign. Gruters forged a relationship with Donald Trump in 2012 after Republican leaders snubbed the New York celebrity at the Republican National Convention in Tampa, Florida, that also would advance him. Trump accepted an invitation from Gruters to speak in Sarasota the night before the convention. Gruters arranged for Trump to be declared "statesman of the year" several times at Republican political functions in Sarasota.

Although President Trump nominated Gruters to the Amtrak board of directors in 2018, subject to confirmation by the United States Senate, the confirmation was neither confirmed nor rejected, but was sent back to the president.

In 2023, as Trump began another campaign for a second term, he appointed Gruters to manage the funds in a tax-exempt nonprofit that allows dark money donors to Trump to remain anonymous to both the public and to the IRS under Section 527 of the U.S. Internal Revenue Code, the Patriot Legal Defense Fund that is described as "Trump's legal defense expense fund". On April 17, 2025, the president announced that he appointed Gruters to the latest version of the White House Homeland Security Council and a local Florida publication noted the continuing financial dividends Gruters reaps from his relationship to the president.

=== Florida party chair ===
Gruters was elected to a two-year term as chairman of the Republican Party of Florida on January 11, 2019, at the party's annual meeting in Orlando, winning a two-year term. He defeated Bob Starr of Charlotte County and succeeded state Representative Blaise Ingoglia. Gruters passed out red "Keep Florida Great" hats ahead of the vote and declared that his "singular focus over the next two years" was winning reelection for Trump in 2020. Gruters's election coincides with more internal unity among the Florida Republican Party, which had been divided after a Jim Greer scandal and had suffered internal fractures during Governor Rick Scott's terms, when Scott withdrew financial and organization support for the party after Ingoglia had defeated Scott's preferred candidate. He won a second two-year term as RPOF chairman in 2021.

=== Florida legislature ===
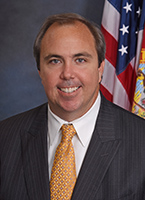
Florida state representative 2017 portrait

In 2016, Gruters won election to the Florida House of Representatives from the 73rd District, which then included Eastern Manatee County and Northeastern Sarasota County. In 2018, he won election to the Florida Senate representing the 23rd District, then consisting of Sarasota County and part of Charlotte County. Gruters was endorsed in 2018 by the Florida Chamber of Commerce. In 2022, he won re-election to the Florida Senate.

Gruters introduced three environmental bills in December 2018, ahead of the legislative session to address red tide and other issues: one bill would restore septic inspection regulations that had been lifted during the Great Recession and another would fine polluters for sewage spills.

In the wake of a fatal shooting at a San Diego, California, synagogue in 2019, the Florida Senate passed a bill by Gruters to combat anti-Semitism, including by requiring schools to deal with anti-Semitic behavior the same way they do racial discrimination.

Gruters was a driving force behind Florida's 2019 law (S.B. 198) that forces local and state law enforcement to honor U.S. Immigration and Customs Enforcement (ICE) detainers and prohibits local government from implementing "sanctuary" policies (which no Florida government had adopted). The controversial bill passed the Florida Senate 22-18, and was signed into law by Florida's Republican governor, Ron DeSantis.

Gruters sponsored Senate Bill 796, requiring electric utilities to adopt long-term plans for burying electric lines as a protective measure against hurricanes; the Senate voted 39-1 in favor of the bill.

Gruters filed a bill to ban abortions 20 weeks after fertilization.

Gruters sponsored Senate Bill 230, a piece of legislation that would reinstate Florida's controversial quest to identify purported noncitizen voters. The legislation would require the supervisor of elections in each Florida county to enter into a local agreement with court officials to obtain a list of jurors who had self-identified as non-citizens. That list would then be compared to the registered voter rolls and any names of non-citizen found would be purged from voter rolls. Prior efforts to purge the voter lists in Florida have been a failure, with lists of purported "non-citizens" found to contain some U.S. citizens. The president of the League of Women Voters of Florida called the legislation Gruters proposed as "most likely a politically motivated proposal".

Gruters also proposed legislation that would ban smoking at public beaches statewide. Convicted violators would be fined up to $25 or sentenced to ten hours of public service.

In 2019, he introduced the Florida Inclusive Workforce Act to ban employment discrimination against LGBT people. This was a scaled-back version of the legislation; unlike the anti-discrimination bill Gruters had previously supported. His new bill would not extend the anti-discrimination provisions in housing and public accommodations. These omissions were opposed by the LGBT rights group Equality Florida; Gruters defended the incrementalist approach of the bill, saying that would maximize the chances of passage.

After Joe Biden won the 2020 presidential election and Donald Trump refused to concede having lost the election and making false claims of fraud, Gruters pushed for legislation in the Florida legislature that would restrict voting rights in the state. In 2021, Gruters called for cancelling all existing mail-in ballot requests, saying they would be "devastating" for Republicans up for re-election in 2022.

He sponsored Bill HJR 31 and guided it through the Florida legislature so that it would be a constitutional amendment proposal presented to the voters on the 2024 ballot as Amendment 1. The proposal intended to do away with an existing state constitutional requirement that school board candidates run in non-partisan races, without party labels. During the discussion on the Senate floor, Gruters tried to assure opponents of his proposed politicalization of school board races that the proposed amendment was a move toward "transparency". The proposed amendment was defeated on November 8, 2024.

== State legislation proposals ==
As a Florida state senator, Gruters proposed several pieces of legislation related to sanctuary cities, E-Verify for businesses, and immigration enforcement practices that were adopted.

=== State anti-sanctuary city legislation ===
In 2019, Gruters proposed, and DeSantis signed into law, the “Rule of Law Adherence Act” (SB168) to require law enforcement agencies to support, not obstruct, the enforcement of federal immigration law. The bill effectively banned sanctuary jurisdictions within the state of Florida. Gruters said at the time "We passed the strongest ban on sanctuary cities in the entire country" and that the law was "about criminal illegal aliens who have broken other laws". DeSantis said of Gruters' bill: "This bill is simple … it's our state's policy that we work with the federal government", adding that sanctuary cities "defy federal law".

=== State E-Verify for businesses ===
After a 2019 trip to the U.S.–Mexico border, Gruters announced he was going to work to require Florida businesses to use a federal immigration database to check whether the workers at the business are in the country legally. “We want to make sure we have the laws in place we need", Gruters said. "We want to capitalize on the success we have had so far and we want to keep on going."

E-Verify was finally passed into Florida law (CS/CS/SB 1718) in 2023, after a long battle in the Florida Legislature. The law requires private businesses with 25 or more employees to use the E-Verify system for new employees, while the law retains the requirements for public employers, contractors, and subcontractors to use the E-Verify system.

=== Florida illegal immigrant bill ===
In 2025, the Florida legislature passed legislation proposed by Gruters, bill (SB 2-C), and which DeSantis signed into law just hours after it passed. That Florida law toughens penalties for crimes committed by illegal immigrants; creates a statewide immigration enforcement panel; imposes the death penalty for illegal immigrants who commit first-degree murder or who rape children; and makes it a state crime for illegal immigrants to enter the state.

It was a fight in the legislature and with the governor at times to get the bill passed. In the end, after the bill passed DeSantis said: "I have no hard feelings at all. You know, these are not easy issues... There were differences of opinion about how to go about it, the timing, the substances, and we brought it all in for a landing, and we're better off as a result of having done that."

== Republican National Committee ==
On January 17, 2025, after receiving the endorsement of President Donald Trump, Gruters was elected treasurer of the Republican National Committee, succeeding KC Crosbie.

On July 24, 2025, after Michael Whatley announced he would run in the 2026 United States Senate election in North Carolina, Donald Trump endorsed Gruters to be the next chair of the Republican National Committee. Whatley endorsed him as well, and called Gruters "a true conservative fighter". On August 22, 2025, he was elected sixty-seventh chair. After his election, Gruters told RNC members: “Today is not about one person, it is about our mission: the midterms are ahead, where we must expand our majority in the House and Senate and continue electing Republicans nationwide."

NPR noted that election of Gruters as RNC chairman "highlights the growing influence of Florida Republicans within the national party and administration", such as White House chief of staff Susie Wiles and Secretary of State Marco Rubio, a former Florida U.S. Senator.

== International attention ==
In April 2025, Craig Pittman, a popular Florida commentator and humorist, wrote about the unusual attention to such a local U.S. politician as Gruters by a British tabloid with the highest circulation of paid newspapers in the UK. Namely, on April 1, 2025, Daily Mail featured an article on Gruters that was written by Katelyn Caralle, their senior political reporter covering "White House insiders". Her article was about Gruters' response when asked about his social media account that was following approximately 60 OnlyFans models.

== Personal life ==
Gruters is an accountant. His professional occupations include being a member of Robinson, Gruters & Roberts PA CPA LLC in Venice, Florida, and being the manager of all of the dark money funds to Trump through the Patriot Legal Defense Fund.

Gruters lives in Sarasota County. He is married to Sydney Gruters and they have three children. She was appointed to a position as executive director of the foundation board at New College of Florida during the controversial 2023 takeover of the state honors college by Governor DeSantis. She resigned from that position in 2025 to run for political office and President Trump and many of his national political supporters have endorsed her candidacy in a 2026 bid to fill the Florida seat of retiring Vern Buchanan in the federal congress, whose 2006 campaign Joe Gruters worked on early in his political career.

Party political offices
Preceded by Blaise Ingoglia	Chair of the Florida Republican Party; 2019–2023	Succeeded by Christian Ziegler
Preceded by Michael Whatley	Chair of the Republican National Committee; 2025–present	Incumbent
