= List of The Late Show with Stephen Colbert sketches =

The following is a list of sketches, segments, and jokes that debuted on The Late Show with Stephen Colbert on CBS.

== Current solo sketches ==
=== Cold Open ===
An opening sketch, often featuring an actual news story, but with fake network logos (often parodying CNN, Fox News, MSNBC, ABC News, C-SPAN, or PBS NewsHour), followed by a comic segment parodying the story. Sometimes the sketch is a song parody. During the early years of the show the cold open usually featured Colbert and some of his producers like Liz Levin or Paul Dinello.

=== Stephen Colbert Gets All Up in Your Faith (September 15, 2015–present) ===
A segment in which Colbert talks about news referring to different religions and spiritual beliefs, such as Buddhism, or the First Church of Cannabis. The title is a play on the phrase Get All Up in Your Face, which means to confront somebody in an aggressive way. It functions in a similar way to This Week in God, an early The Daily Show segment hosted by Colbert. Described as the show's "eternal segment", it only has had four editions so far.

=== Covetton House (September 18, 2015–present) ===
Covetton House is Colbert's take on celebrity luxury brands, especially Gwyneth Paltrow's Goop. Each sketch typically features everyday products with fancy names and jacked-up prices. Some items were available for sale at Goop's website, with all proceeds going to charity.

=== First Drafts (February 16, 2016–present) ===
Colbert invites a member of the audience up to read holiday/special event cards and their "first drafts", which poke fun at the event in question. Since the COVID-19 pandemic, Colbert's wife Evelyn McGee took the place of the audience member. In the first edition, producer Paul Dinello handed Stephen the cards.

=== Cyborgasm (October 11, 2017–present) ===
Colbert shares the latest news about technology, discussing things like Artificial Intelligence, robots, and often mocking the most absurd new products.

=== Meanwhile (September 26, 2018–present) ===
Colbert jokes about lesser-known and funny news, such as Philadelphia Flyers' new mascot Gritty and Buffalo Wild Wings' new BBQ pumpkin spice wings, that he claims he could not fit into the monologue. The segment always starts with an elaborate metaphor explaining the segment. In the period during the COVID-19 pandemic when the show was not taped in the Ed Sullivan Theater, it was called "Quarantinewhile," a portmanteau of quarantine and meanwhile.

=== Kids' Questions (May 14, 2020–present) ===
Colbert answers video questions submitted by children. The sketch typically begins and ends with Colbert complaining about the title. (The sketch has had numerous titles, including Stephen Takes Your Kids, Stephen's Re-Education Camp, Stephen Colbert Is Watching Your Children, Stephen Doesn't Care About Your Kids, Stephen Colbert Is Short And Punchy. and Stephen Colbert Talks Down to Children.)

=== Space News (June 24, 2021–present) ===
A segment of the opening monologue telling jokes related to outer space. Space News is now a stand-alone segment.

=== That's Yeet Dabbing on Fleek, Fam! (September 9, 2021–present) ===
Stephen covers youth-related issues and trends, though because of his age, he will bring writer, and "Certified Young Person", Eliana Kwartler to help. Kwartler will often use the explanation as a ruse to get a raise, which Colbert always denies. In the first edition, writers Glenn Eichler, Felipe Torres Medina, and writer's assistant Cara Washington fulfilled this role. Earlier pieces talking about youth-related issues also featured Kwartler. A similar segment, focused on fashion trends is called Stephen Colbert's Slay Your Fleek.

=== Rich, Please! (October 26, 2022–present) ===
Stephen talks about news related to billionaires, and their plans to prepare for the apocalypse. It usually ends with Colbert suggesting a social uprising. The title is a play on the phrase "bitch, please!". The graphics feature a wad of cash, named Cashy, as the segment's mascot. An earlier version of the segment was called Rich People. They Are Just Not Like Us. Us Pay Taxes. During quarantine a similar segment, focusing on the woes of late-stage capitalism, such as water scarcity, and the unlimited power of corporations, was titled Uh-Oh.

=== The Sound of Science (February 23, 2023–present) ===
Stephen covers the latest science-related news. The title is a play on Simon & Garfunkel's "The Sound of Silence", with the graphics featuring Colbert as both members of the duo, and the first line as the theme song.

== Former solo sketches ==
- America: Endgame: Stephen covers the 2020 Democratic and Republican National Conventions. The title and intro are a parody of Avengers: Endgame, with Democrats and Republicans as Marvel superheroes and supervillains (particularly Donald Trump as Thanos), respectively.
- Bedtime Stories: On occasion when Colbert has an author on the show, he ends the episode by asking the author to read him a bedtime story. Authors who performed the sketch with Colbert include Jonathan Franzen and John Irving.
- The Big Furry Hat: Colbert dons a giant hat that comes down from the ceiling and makes a series of humorous proclamations that people must follow (e.g., "Actor Paul Rudd must begin aging like the rest of us"). On November 13, 2015, John Cleese joined him wearing a bigger and furrier hat.
- Brain Fight With Tuck Buckford: During the child custody trial of InfoWars host Alex Jones, Colbert introduced a new right-wing pundit character by the name of Tuck Buckford as the host of a fictional show titled "Brain Fight" beginning with the April 17, 2017, episode. The sketches are based on infamous segments of Jones' radio show, which have Colbert parodying his over-the-top style of reporting, mocking his alt-right views and conspiracy theories, including certain personal aspects of Jones' life based on testimonies from the court trial.
- Cargo Unchained: A monologue segment discussing the recent shortages of worldwide consumer products, named after the film Django Unchained.
- Cartoon Donald Trump: In the March 30, 2016, episode, Colbert declared that based on his behavior in the presidential debates and town halls, Donald Trump had become a "cartoonish version of himself". In response, Colbert interviewed a "slightly less cartoonish" version of Trump—an animated caricature of him portrayed with a childish demeanor. The character was designed by Tim Luecke, voiced by Brian Stack, and is controlled using Adobe Character Animator, which allows Colbert to interact with the character in real-time. Late Show tested the technology with a character of Colbert's "Irish ancestor" (which was intended for, but cut from a St. Patrick's Day episode), and a sketch involving a cartoon bluebird who supported Bernie Sanders (in reference to a Sanders rally in Portland, Oregon where a bird landed on his podium). After Bill Clinton stated in his 2016 Democratic National Convention speech that the Republicans had created a "cartoon" version of her, Colbert introduced Cartoon Hillary Clinton. Both Cartoon Trump and Cartoon Clinton have made appearances as recurring characters in later episodes, and Cartoon Trump was featured in an animated short during Colbert's election night special for Showtime. Showtime later announced that Colbert would executive produce a satirical animated series based on the sketches; the series, Our Cartoon President, premiered in January 2018.
- Chopper Talk/Chair Chat: In "Chopper Talk," Colbert discusses Trump's interviews in front of an operating Marine One helicopter. The spinoff "Chair Chat" focuses on interviews where Trump is sitting down.
- Doin' It Donkey Style: Stephen covers 2020 Democratic candidates for President. The segment begins with two animated flag-colored donkeys saying a one-line summary of a Democratic policy position (like "equal pay").
- Don and the Giant Impeach: Stephen covers the first impeachment of Donald Trump. The segment begins with Trump saying a one-line summary of his position (like "witch hunt") as he runs away from a giant peach, parodying James and the Giant Peach. The sketch has been reprised as "Don and the Giant Impeach 2: Go Fast, We're Furious" as Stephen covers the second impeachment of Donald Trump following the storming of the United States Capitol on January 6, 2021.
- Fury Road to the White House 2020: Updates on the 2020 United States presidential election. The name and intro are a parody of Mad Max: Fury Road.
- Gaetz Gate: Updates on the controversies surrounding Florida Representative Matt Gaetz.
- Goin' Viral/Catch a Third Wave: Endless Bummer These segments provided updates on the COVID-19 pandemic. Originally titled "Goin' Viral," it was renamed "Catch a Third Wave" in the fall of 2020, and given an animated opening with a cartoon coronavirus on a surfboard.
- The Hungry for Power Games: In a parody of The Hunger Games, Colbert dresses up as a version of Caesar Flickerman and mocks a candidate that has dropped out of the race from the 2016 United States presidential election. The sketch has occasionally been reprised as "The Hungry To Leave Power Games", mocking departing members of the Trump administration such as Rex Tillerson and Scott Pruitt.
- The Late Show Figure-It-Out-a-Tron: In a parody of Glenn Beck's use of chalkboards, Colbert brings out a chalkboard with names of people implicated in an ongoing scandal written all over it. He then tries to figure out the links between these people by drawing lines connecting their names. These lines form a humorous and often crude drawing related to the scandal, such as a penis or swastika.
- Midnight Confessions: Colbert examines his conscience to his audience. He starts with a disclaimer that while the things that he confesses are not technically sins, he still feels guilty about them. Done from a fake confessional. Its popularity resulted in a book being written based on it.
- The Mono-Log: Colbert gives updates related to the 2020 appearance of an unidentified monolith in the Utah desert and other monoliths around the world
- Piano 1-0-Fun! with Jon Batiste: Jon Batiste hosts absurd instructional videos.
- Real News Tonight: A parody of television newscasts, anchored by "Jim Anchorton" (John Thibodeaux) and "Jill Newslady" (Jen Spyra), that consists entirely of overly-positive fake stories designed to praise Donald Trump. In August 2017, when Trump's daughter-in-law Lara Trump began producing Real News Update videos that similarly presented positive coverage of Trump, an edition of the sketch utilized clips from Real News Update to make Lara interact with the Jill and Jim characters as a "special correspondent". On June 18, 2019, the Jill and Jim characters attended a rally launching Trump's 2020 re-election campaign at the Amway Center in Orlando, interviewing supporters for a segment that aired on the June 20 episode. Their press credentials had been revoked at the last minute, but they still managed to make it inside the event by registering online (a process that also exposed exaggerated claims surrounding the attendance of the rally).
- The Road From The White House: Stephen covers Trump's post-election litigation and Biden's presidential transition plans after the 2020 presidential election. The segment begins with a President Trump cartoon, while still claiming victory, being taken out of the White House by cartoons of Joe Biden and Kamala Harris. Biden and Harris are wearing protective gear and spraying the President cartoon with "VOTE" aerosol spray bottles.
- Romansplaining with Stephen Colbert: A segment similar to "Meanwhile", focusing on stories dealing with relationships and romance. The title is a portmanteau of "romance" and "mansplaining".
- Seditionist Round Up Roundup: Colbert details the latest arrests of rioters from the 2021 storming of the United States Capitol. Segment opens with a cattle, horse, or sheep making animal-themed puns about the rioters.
- Slams: Colbert will joke about a particular item in his monologue, do a dance (to an excerpt from the Deee-Lite hit "Groove Is in the Heart"), and then a stamp-like logo comes on-screen with the slam message and a deep voice reading it off.
- Stephen Talks with God: Colbert talks with God, as portrayed as an animated character projected on the ceiling of the Ed Sullivan Theater.
- The Vax-Scene: Updates on efforts to deliver the COVID-19 vaccine to as many people as possible. The segment begins with cartoon syringes singing parodies of famous musical numbers imploring viewers to get vaccinated.
- WERD: Colbert chooses a word or phrase as a theme for a rant on a topical subject or news item while humorous captions displayed in a sidebar either highlight or sarcastically undercut what he is saying. The segment is based on "The Wørd", a segment Colbert performed throughout the entire run of The Colbert Report. Colbert introduced The Wørd segment on The Late Show on July 18, 2016. During the July 27, 2016, episode, Colbert indirectly stated Comedy Central had objected to his use of elements from the Report on Late Show; subsequently, the segment has been done under the name "WERD".
- Wheel of News: Colbert spins a wheel with random topics of news to talk about. Based on Wheel of Fortune.

== Recurring sketches with guests ==
=== Big Questions with Even Bigger Stars ===
Colbert and a guest sit under the stars and have absurd conversations about topics. Such conversations include killing baby Hitler, what Santa does the rest of the year, and whether they would rather have feet for hands or hands for feet.

==== Guests Performed with ====
1. Scarlett Johansson (September 9, 2015)
2. Tom Hanks (September 30, 2015)
3. Bryan Cranston (November 6, 2015)
4. Jennifer Lawrence (December 14, 2015)
5. Will Smith (August 2, 2016)
6. Kermit the Frog (February 1, 2016)
7. Samuel L. Jackson (June 29, 2016)
8. Mel Gibson (November 1, 2016)
9. Ryan Reynolds (March 21, 2017)
10. Brad Pitt (May 16, 2017)
11. Nicole Kidman (November 1, 2017)
12. Justin Timberlake (November 29. 2017)
13. Benedict Cumberbatch (May 18, 2018)
14. Matthew McConaughey (January 23, 2019)

=== The Colbert Questionert ===
The Questionert (pronounced "questionnaire") is a series of 15 questions designed to get to know celebrities. They include "What is your least favorite smell?", "What number am I (Colbert) thinking of?", and "Describe the rest of your life in five words". Many of these are pre-recorded and aired on special Friday episodes.

==== Guests Performed with ====
1. Tom Hanks (January 2021)
2. Meryl Streep (January 2021)
3. George Clooney (January 2021)
4. Tiffany Haddish (February 2021)
5. Billy Crystal (March 2021)
6. John Oliver (April 2021)
7. Jane Fonda (April 2021)
8. Ringo Starr (April 2021)
9. John Krasinski (May 2021)
10. Seth Rogen (June 2021)
11. Neil deGrasse Tyson (September 2021)
12. Jon Stewart (September 2021)
13. Bruce Springsteen (October 2021)
14. Jeff Goldblum (November 2021)
15. Sting (November 2021)
16. Jennifer Lawrence (December 2021)
17. Keanu Reeves (December 2021)
18. Bradley Cooper (January 2022)
19. Martha Stewart (February 2022)
20. Sandra Bullock (March 2022)
21. Daniel Craig (May 2022)
22. Josh Brolin (May 2022)
23. Shaquille O'Neal (May 2022)
24. Jon Batiste (June 2022)
25. Ethan Hawke (September 2022)
26. Robert De Niro (September 2022)
27. James Taylor (November 2022)
28. Bono (November 2022)
29. Cate Blanchett (November 2022)
30. Mariah Carey (December 2022)
31. Emily Blunt (December 2022)
32. Michelle Obama (January 2023)
33. Prince Harry (March 2023)
34. Stephen Colbert, himself - with John Dickerson hosting the segment and special guests each offering one question (featuring: Billy Crystal, "Weird Al" Yankovic, Josh Brolin, Martha Stewart, Mark Hamill, Jim Gaffigan, Jeff Daniels, Tiffany Haddish, Stephen's wife Evelyn McGee Colbert, Amy Sedaris, Ben Stiller, Aubrey Plaza, James Taylor, Robert De Niro, and Dickerson himself) (May 2026, during his second last episode)

=== Community Calendar ===
Colbert and a guest host a community calendar of events in the guest's hometown. Based from Colbert's special appearance at Only in Monroe, a local public access program in Monroe, Michigan, with Eminem as his guest.

==== Guests Performed with ====
1. Jeff Daniels—Chelsea, Michigan (March 11, 2016)
2. Nick Offerman—Minooka, Illinois (April 4, 2016)
3. Aaron Paul—McCall, Idaho (June 17, 2016)
4. Adam Driver—Mishawaka, Indiana (January 5, 2017)
5. John Oliver—Bedford of Bedfordshire, England (February 7, 2017)
6. James Marsden—Stillwater, Oklahoma (April 20, 2018)
7. Melissa McCarthy—Plainfield, Illinois (May 11, 2018)
8. Aubrey Plaza—Wilmington, Delaware (June 14, 2019)
9. Ty Burrell—Grants Pass, Oregon (March 6, 2020)
10. John Mulaney—The Internet (May 1, 2020)

=== Family Meeting ===
Colbert and his lead guest hold a family meeting in character as the concerned "parents" of the US.

==== Guests Performed with ====
1. William H. Macy (November 19, 2016)
2. Joe Biden (December 7, 2016)
3. Leslie Mann (January 31, 2017)
4. Nick Kroll (September 28, 2017)
5. Tom Hanks (June 16, 2022)
6. Michelle Obama (November 14, 2022)

=== Personal Space ===
Colbert and a guest talk in Colbert's "personal space"—a cardboard box, labeled "Personal Space," just big enough for their heads and the camera.

==== Guests Performed with ====
1. Tom Hanks (December 12, 2017)
2. John Oliver (February 10, 2018)
3. Seth Rogen (June 22, 2018)
4. Steve Carell (February 3, 2019)
5. Conan O'Brien (May 24, 2019)
6. Ricky Gervais (July 27, 2019)

=== Rescue Dog Rescue ===
Colbert and his lead guest try to help find homes for dogs up for adoption by making up stories about them (such as claiming one dog knows the lyrics to the Frozen song "Let It Go", but will not sing them). A real partnership with the rescue-and-adoption organization North Shore Animal League America, 27 "Rescue Dog Rescue" editions would run over the years, the first featuring guest Aubrey Plaza in February 2017. Every dog featured on the segment would ultimately find new homes.

With the show entering its final weeks in Spring 2026, Stephen presented a two-legged variation of the segment on April 1 called "Rescue Staff Rescue," in which he told stories about members of the staff inspired by their roles on the show (for example, highlighting staff writer Maya Elany's task of clearing "the idiotic things we write" with the network). One month later, on May 4, a follow-up feature titled "Rescue Dog Rescue: Where Arf They Now?" applied new tall tales to some of the dogs who were adopted after being profiled on the segment (e.g. one dog earned a black belt in karate, while another stole $40 million from the Late Show's budget).

==== Guests Performed with ====
1. Aubrey Plaza (February 2017)
2. Bryan Cranston (March 2017)
3. Jim Parsons (May 2017)
4. Ellie Kemper (August 2017)
5. Billy Eichner (October 2017)
6. Nick Jonas (December 2017)
7. Whoopi Goldberg (2018)
8. Emilia Clarke (April 2019)
9. Tom Holland (June 2019)
10. Jason Sudeikis (August 2021)
11. John Oliver (February 2022)

=== Just One Question ===
Members of Colbert's staff each ask one question to a celebrity.
