= Hodgetwins =

American internet personalities

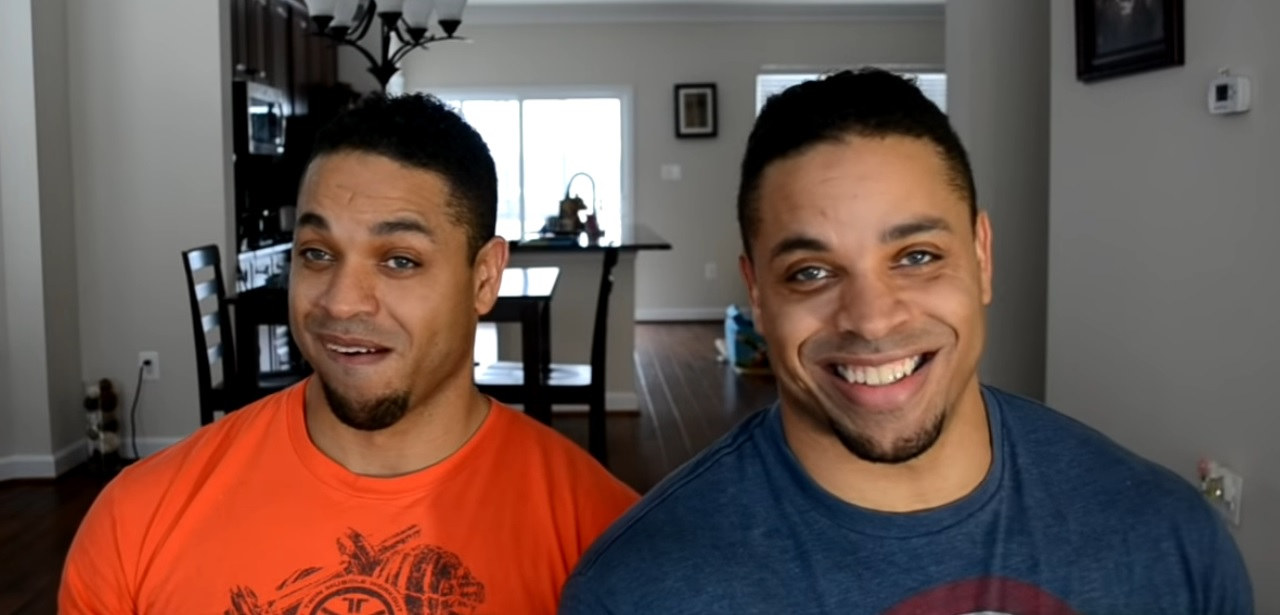
- Kevin (left) and Keith in 2014
- Born: Kevin Hodge; Keith Hodge; September 17, 1974 (age 52); Martinsville, Virginia, U.S.
- Education: Fieldale-Collinsville High School
- Occupations: YouTubers; comedians; political commentators; fitness influencers
- Children: Keith: 3 Kevin: 4

YouTube information
- Channels: TheHodgetwins; Conservative Twins; TwinsPod
- Years active: 2008–present
- Genres: Comedy; Politics; Fitness
- Subscribers: 3.41 million (Hodge Twins); 1.7 million (askhodgetwins); 2.9 million (ConservativeTwins)
- Views: 500+ million (twinmuscleworkout); 300+ million (askhodgetwins); 200+ million (ConservativeTwins)
- Military career
- Allegiance: United States
- Branch: United States Marine Corps
- Last updated: June 30th 2025
- Website: officialhodgetwins.com

The Hodgetwins (born September 17, 1974; also known as the Conservative Twins) are an American stand-up comedy and conservative political commentary duo consisting of twin brothers Keith and Kevin Hodge. The twins started out as YouTubers, but in 2016 branched out to live stand-up comedy shows.

They were at VidCon 2016, and The Root included them in a list of twelve of the best and brightest black creators at the event.

== Early lives and education ==
The twins were born to Raish Lee Hodge Jr. and Christine Hodge, raised in Martinsville, Virginia, and attended Fieldale-Collinsville High School where they graduated in 1992. They both enlisted in the Marine Corps after high school. They have older siblings, Timmy and Rosalyn.

They reached half a million subscribers on YouTube in 2013. They also worked for AAA, but were fired after recording videos for their YouTube channel in the conference room.

== Career ==
=== Fitness ===
The Hodgetwins are certified International Sports Sciences Association trainers and appeared on the front page of Train magazine. In 2016, they were guests on comedy podcast The Fighter and the Kid. In 2016, CheatSheet rated them as the 4th-best fitness YouTube channel.

=== Comedy ===
They have toured the UK and Australia. Their No Filter tour took place in 2016.

=== Political commentary ===
The Hodgetwins are vocal conservatives, and have over three million subscribers on their Conservative Twins YouTube channel. The twins were supporters of Donald Trump, and appeared on Trump's Real News Update webcast.

They oppose the Black Lives Matter political and social movement.

They have strongly criticized Israel's actions during the Gaza War.

Two of the most shared Facebook posts about the George Floyd protests originated from the Hodgetwins. They are frequent guests on conservative comedian Steven Crowder's various programs.

Some claims the twins have made about Joe Biden and Black Lives Matter have been deemed as false by fact-checkers. In 2019, a venue canceled one of their shows after the Hodgetwins posted a video to their YouTube account making fun of a transgender woman. The venue owner stated the reason for the cancellation was that "[they] don't tolerate transphobia." In 2022, two more of the twins' scheduled comedy shows at the Springer Opera House in Columbus, Georgia and the Tift Theater in Tifton, respectively, were canceled for their anti-LGBTQ content.

== Personal lives ==
The Hodges have been married to their current wives for over 15 years, and lived in Los Angeles for 17 years. They currently reside in Las Vegas. As of 2013, Keith has three children, while Kevin has four. The Hodges are both Christian.

In 2019, two of their cousins' children were shot; the twins used their social media presence to raise money for their medical expenses.

== See also ==
- Black conservatism in the United States
- Diamond and Silk
