= 2025 January Republican National Committee chairmanship election =

- January 17, 2025

168 members of the Republican National Committee
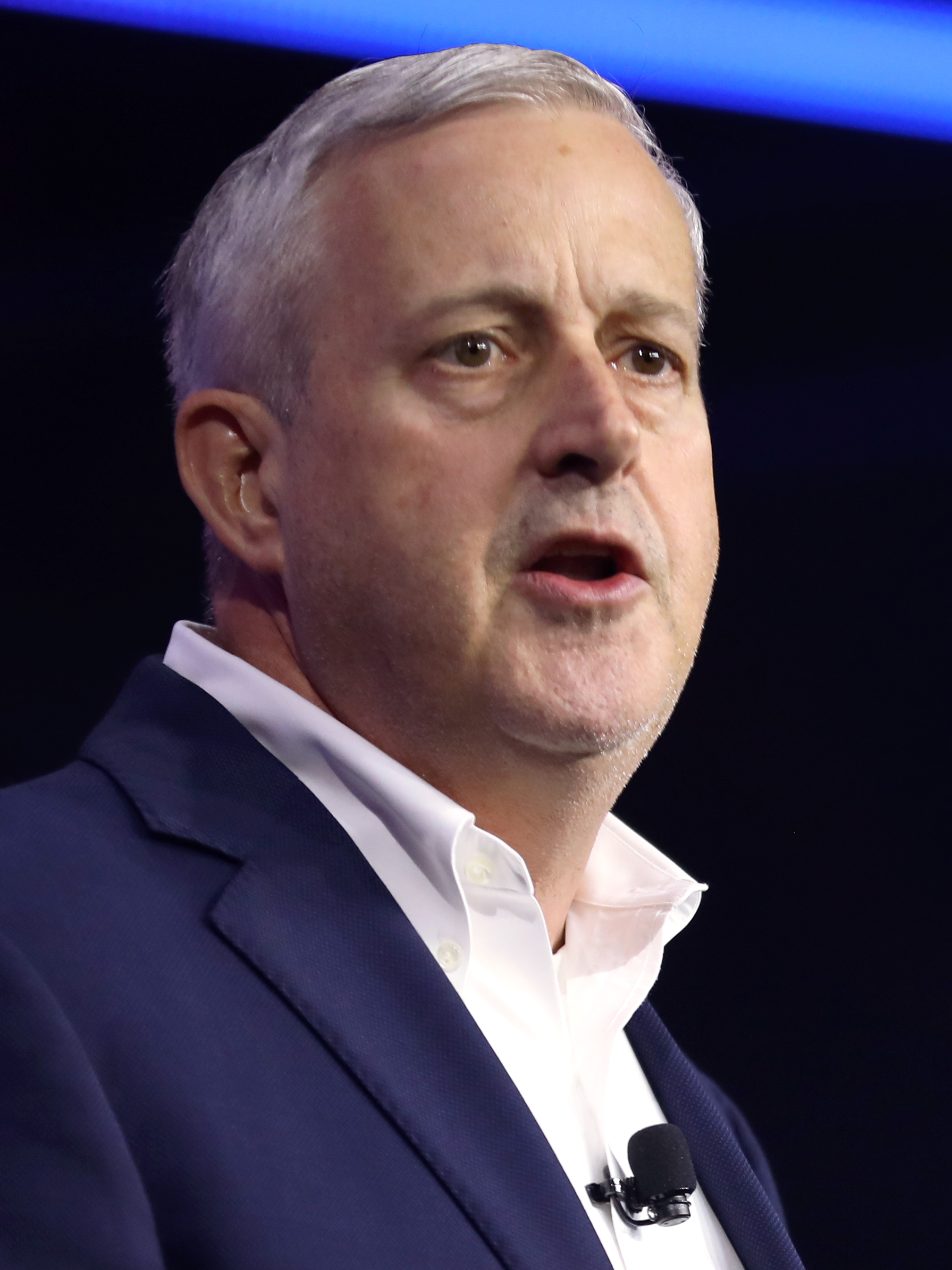
Candidate	Michael Whatley
Caucus vote	Acclamation
Chairman before election
Michael Whatley
Elected Chairman
Michael Whatley

The 2025 January Republican National Committee chairmanship election was held on January 17, 2025, at the Republican National Committee's winter meeting in Washington, D.C.. Incumbent Michael Whatley was reelected chairman by acclamation, receiving unanimous support from committee members present.

== Results ==
=== Nominated ===
- Michael Whatley, incumbent chairman of the Republican National Committee

Candidate	Result
Michael Whatley	Acclamation
