= 2024 Republican National Committee leadership elections =

- 2024 Republican National Committee special chairmanship election
- March 8, 2024

168 members of the Republican National Committee
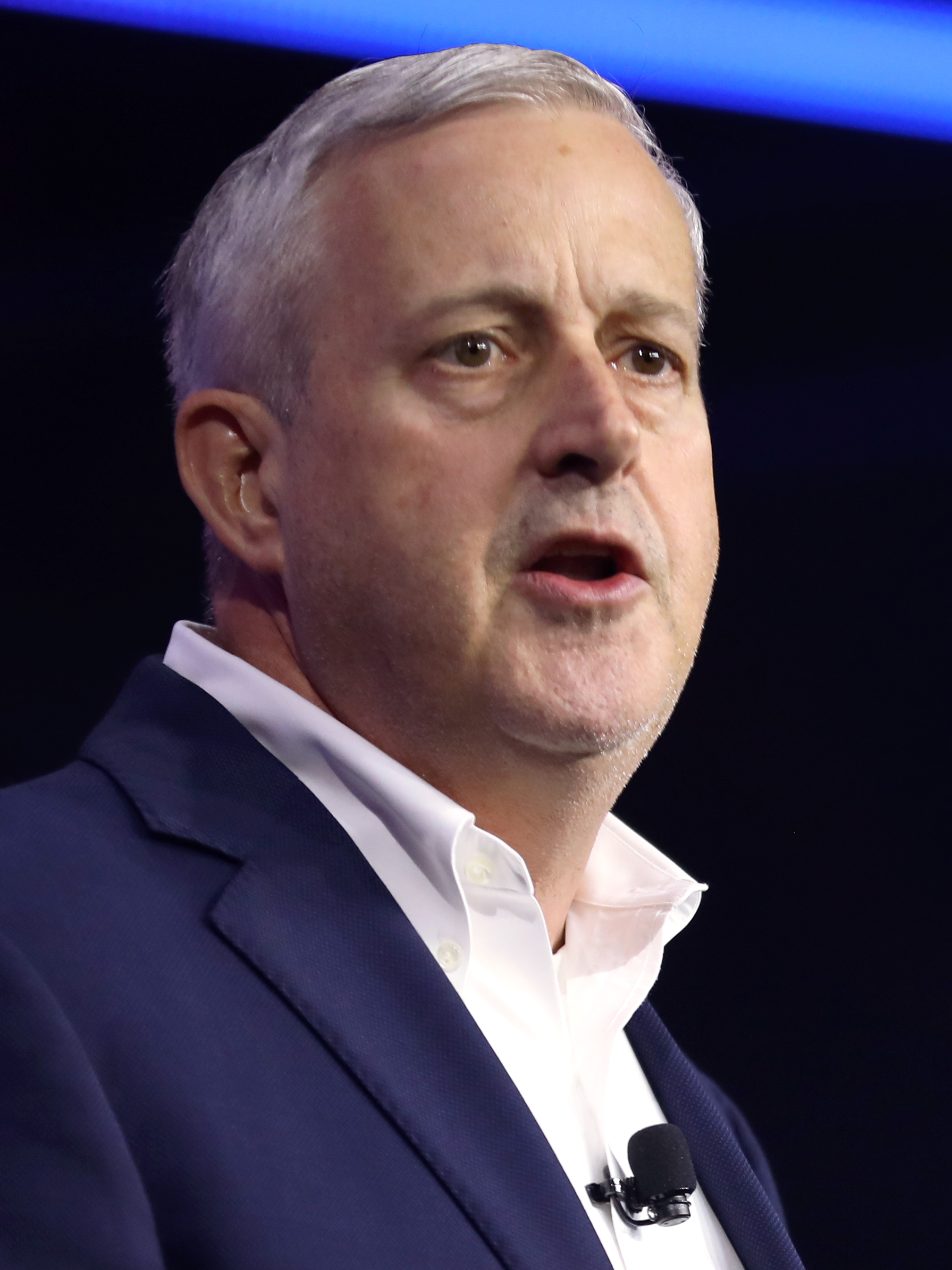
Candidate	Michael Whatley
Caucus vote	Acclamation
Chairwoman before election
Ronna McDaniel
Elected Chairman
Michael Whatley
- 2024 Republican National Committee special co-chairmanship election
- March 8, 2024

168 members of the Republican National Committee
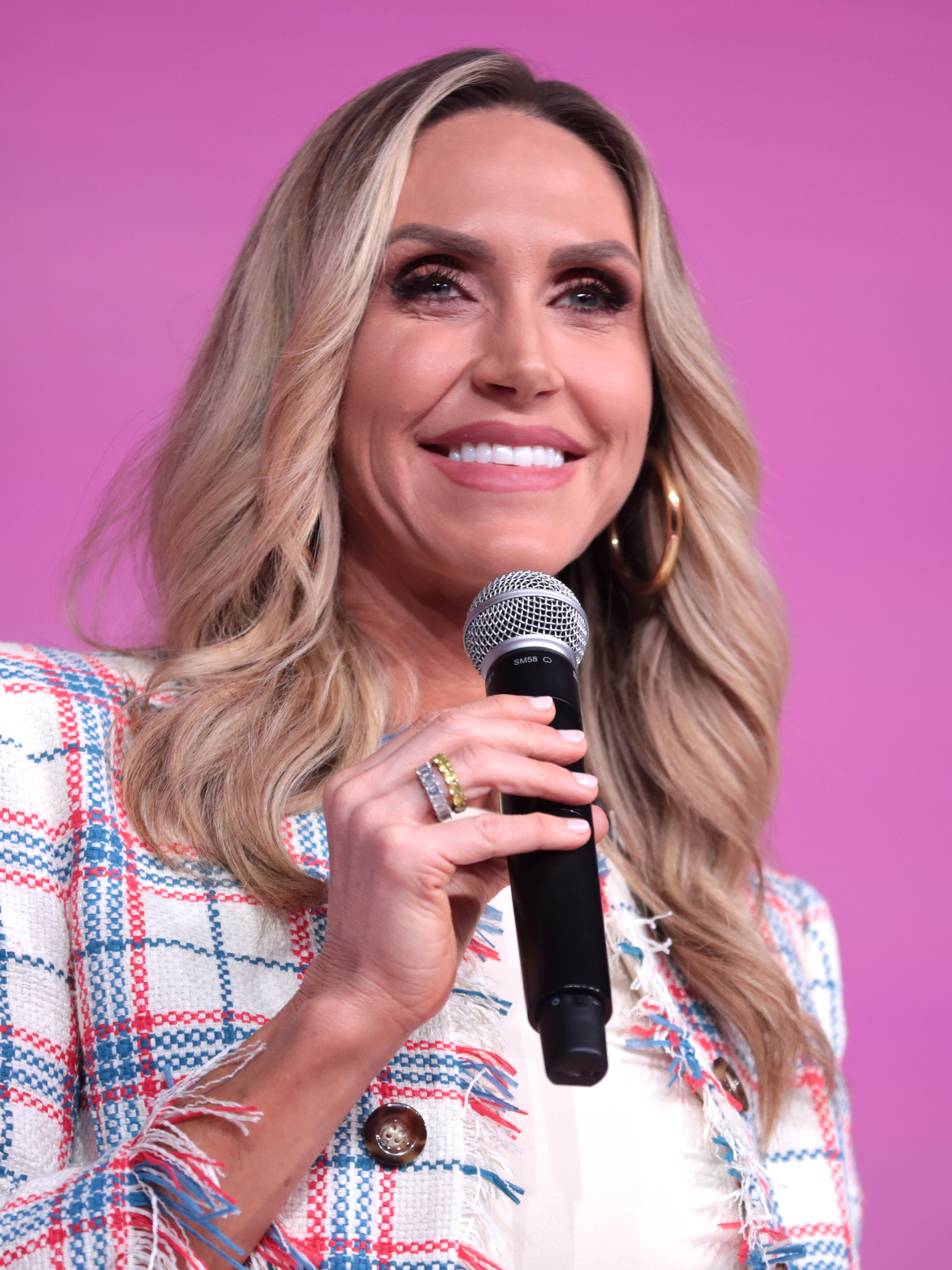
Candidate	Lara Trump
Caucus vote	Acclamation
Co-Chairman before election
Drew McKissick
Elected Co-Chairwoman
Lara Trump

The 2024 Republican National Committee (RNC) special leadership elections were held on March 8, 2024, in Houston, Texas, to determine the next Chair, Co-Chair, and Chief Operating Officer of the Republican National Committee.

Michael Whatley, the Chair of the North Carolina Republican Party, was elected by acclamation as Chairman. Lara Trump, the daughter-in-law of former President and Republican frontrunner Donald Trump, was elected by acclamation as Co-Chair. Both candidates were endorsed by Trump, who during the meeting was formally recognized as the party's presumptive nominee for the 2024 presidential election.

== Background ==
On February 26, 2024, incumbent chairwoman Ronna McDaniel and co-chairman Drew McKissick announced that they would resign from their respective positions at the RNC's spring training on March 8.

== Results ==
=== Chair ===
==== Nominated ====
- Michael Whatley, Chair of the North Carolina Republican Party (2019–2024)

===== Endorsements =====
Michael Whatley

U.S. presidents

- Donald Trump, 45th President of the United States (2017–2021)

Candidate	Round 1
Michael Whatley	Acclamation

=== Co-Chair ===
==== Nominated ====
- Lara Trump, former television producer and daughter-in-law of (then) former President Donald Trump (2017–2021)

===== Endorsements =====
Lara Trump

U.S. presidents

- Donald Trump, 45th President of the United States (2017–2021) (candidate's father-in-law)

Candidate	Round 1
Lara Trump	Acclamation

=== Chief Operating Officer ===
==== Declared ====
- Chris LaCivita, political consultant and senior advisor to Donald Trump's 2024 presidential campaign

===== Endorsements =====
Chris LaCivita

U.S. presidents

- Donald Trump, 45th President of the United States (2017–2021)
