= Diamond and Silk =

Former American political commentary duo (1971–2023)

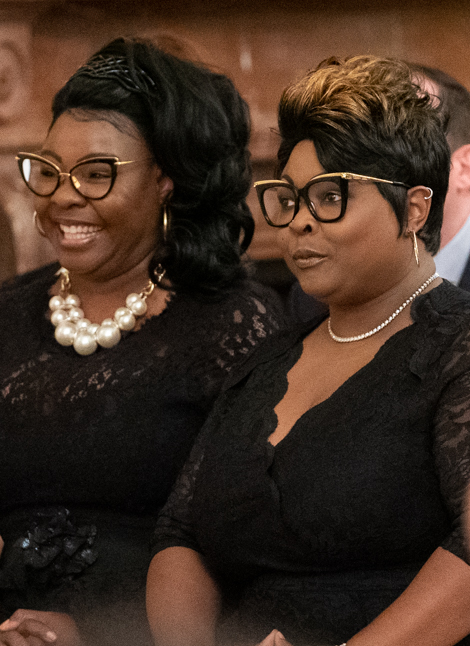
- Diamond and Silk in 2019
- Born: Ineitha Lynnette Hardaway ("Diamond"); November 25, 1971 Herneitha Rochelle Hardaway ("Silk"); January 17, 1970 (age 56)
- Died: ("Diamond"); January 8, 2023 (aged 51); North Carolina, U.S.
- Occupations: Social media personalities; political activists
- Political party: Republican (2016–present); Democratic (until 2016)
- Website: diamondandsilkinc.com

Ineitha Lynnette "Diamond" Hardaway (November 25, 1971 – January 8, 2023) and Herneitha Rochelle Hardaway "Silk" Richardson (born January 17, 1970), known together as Diamond and Silk, were a pair of American conservative political commentators and vloggers. They are known for their support of U.S. president Donald Trump. Both have served as contributors for conservative news channel Newsmax.

The duo received media attention during the 2016 presidential campaign of Trump and again in April 2018 when Facebook notified them they were "unsafe to the community". In response, they publicly complained that Facebook blocked and censored their Facebook page. On April 26, 2018, at Congressman Steve King's invitation, they testified in front of Congress about their removal from Facebook. Subsequently, Republican members of Congress brought up the two women's censorship claims at Mark Zuckerberg's testimony before Congress. In April 2020, the two were terminated from Fox News for questioning the legitimacy of COVID-19 data.

On January 8, 2023, Diamond died at her home in North Carolina from heart disease at age 51 years. Silk has continued her political commentary under the "Diamond and Silk" name despite Diamond's death.

== History ==
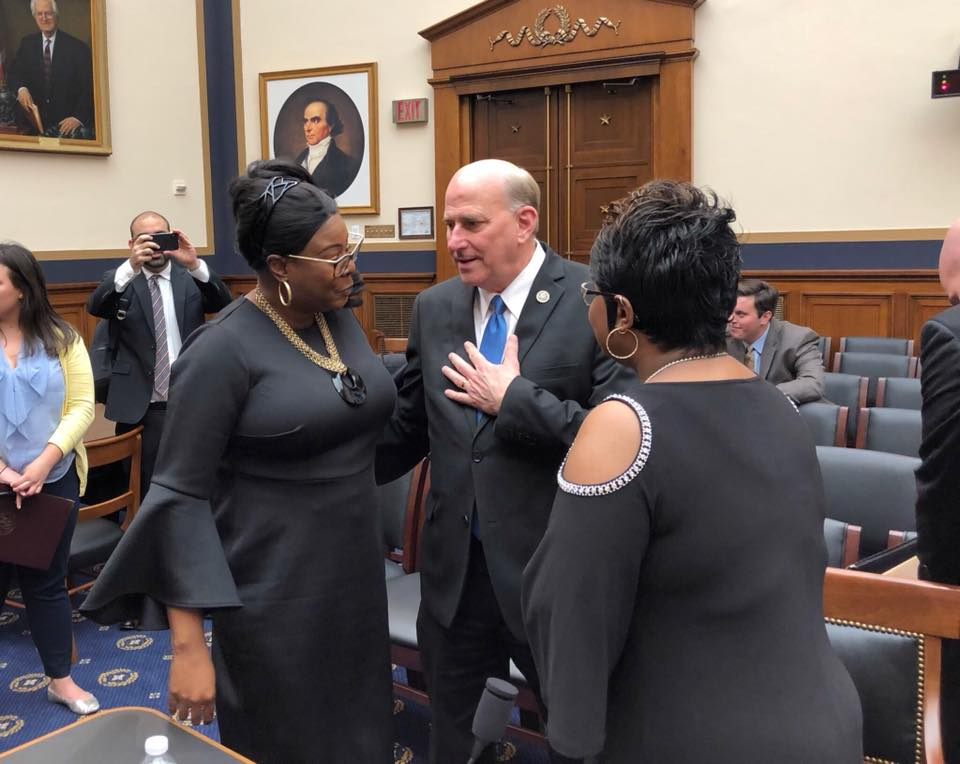
Diamond and Silk with Louie Gohmert

=== Early life ===
Hardaway and Richardson were sisters. They were born as Ineitha Lynette Hardaway and Herneitha Rochelle Hardaway; however, they both went by their middle names. They had three other siblings.

Their parents were Freeman and Betty Willis Hardaway, televangelical pastors based in Fayetteville, North Carolina. Freeman and Betty Hardaway sold purported weight-loss cures and wreaths to ward off witchcraft. For a fee of $50, Betty wrote the names of customers in a Bible, telling customers that this would make God answer their prayers.

=== Politics ===
Hardaway and Richardson were registered as Democrats as of 2012. Their first YouTube videos were a montage about police brutality, titled "Black Lives Matter" (which received 17,000 views), and a video about Sandra Bland, a black woman who died in a Texas jail (it received 32,000 views). After the pair began to make pro-Trump videos, their YouTube channel started to grow considerably.

Although not officially affiliated with the Trump campaign, they urged support for Trump via social media efforts and rallies and traveled to three states for the campaign. The two women first joined Donald Trump as the "Stump for Trump Girls" on stage at his Raleigh, North Carolina, rally on December 4, 2015. They later warmed up the crowd at the Trump rally on January 2, 2016, in Biloxi, Mississippi. They initiated a "Ditch and Switch" campaign to encourage Democrats to register as Republicans and created a website explaining to voters which states had closed primaries and when the deadlines were for changing party affiliations.

On November 2, 2016, Diamond and Silk appeared with Lara Trump, wife of Eric Trump, in Winston-Salem, North Carolina, on behalf of the Trump campaign. They were paid $1,274.94 for field consulting work by the Trump campaign.

They regularly appeared on Fox News shows including Hannity, Fox News Sunday, Watters' World, The Ingraham Angle, and Fox & Friends. In November 2018, Diamond and Silk were given a show on Fox Nation, the online Fox News streaming service. They were covered on ABC's Nightline. Hardaway was notably more talkative during their appearances, while Richardson often just expressed agreement.

A documentary film by Hardaway and Richardson titled Dummycrats premiered in October 2018 at the Trump International Hotel Washington, D.C.

In May 2019, during a Fox & Friends appearance, Diamond and Silk claimed that then Speaker of the U.S. House of Representatives Nancy Pelosi was a "non-functioning alcoholic" who "slurs her words." This was in reference to a doctored and slowed down video that appeared to show her slurring her words. Shortly thereafter, Fox & Friends had to clarify for its viewers that the video was manipulated.

In 2019, Diamond and Silk appeared in a Trump 2020 re-election advertisement where they gave a pitch for his re-election. At the same time, Diamond and Silk had a weekly show on Fox News' streaming service.

Beginning in March 2020, Hardaway and Richardson questioned various information about COVID-19 including whether or not the number of deaths from the pandemic was being inflated to make Donald Trump look incompetent. These questions led to the termination of their work with Fox News in April.

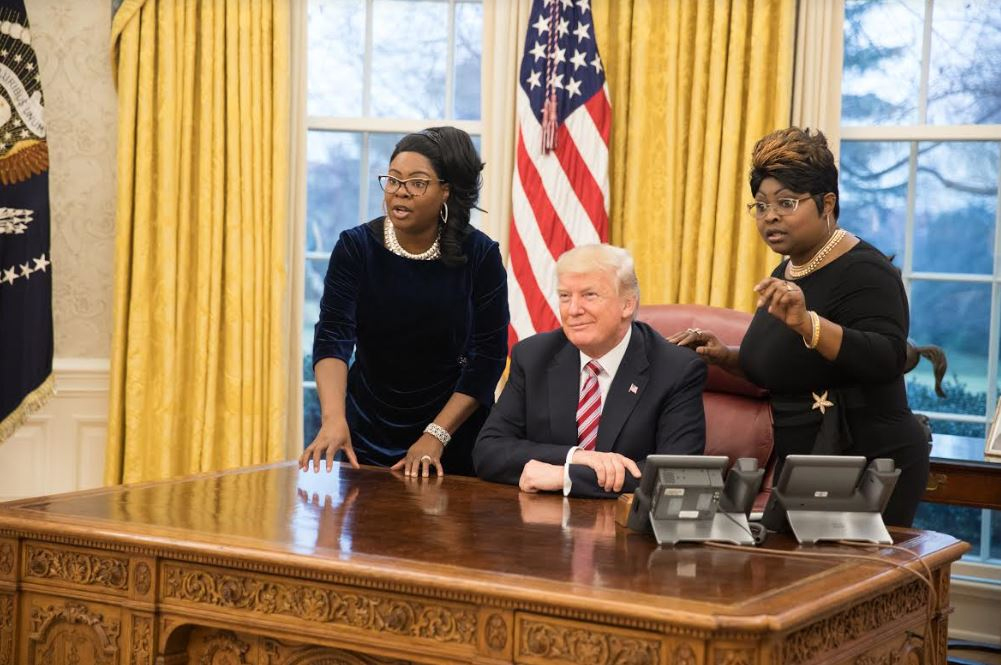
Diamond and Silk with President Trump in February 2018

== Politics ==
=== Racial views ===
Following the controversial Unite the Right rally held in Charlottesville, Virginia, on August 11 and 12, 2017, Hardaway and Richardson, appearing on Fox & Friends, were critical of protesters on both sides in the event. Hardaway criticized Neo-Nazi groups and the Ku Klux Klan for "spewing hate and ... creating violence" declaring "all of them should be condemned and denounced. Period". In the same interview, she also said she does not "like Black Lives Matter and Antifa." They further noted that they feel statues of Civil War Confederate soldiers should be kept in museums.

Hardaway and Richardson, in December 2017, expressed support for Omarosa Manigault Newman following her controversial firing as White House liaison and assistant, faulting the treatment of her by African Americans and the media generally: "What I find appalling, to my brothers and sisters [is] how you ... can laugh at, pick at, gloat at somebody because they either left the White House or you listened to a salacious story that Miss Piggy went around, running around telling everybody." In the same live-stream, they criticized Good Morning America anchor Robin Roberts for saying, "Bye, Felicia" to Newman during a segment on the ABC show which aired on December 14, 2017. Addressing Roberts's remarks, Hardaway said, "How is it that you want the community to come up and then when a sister is sitting at the table, 'Well, she didn't represent us'? Are you crazy?"

=== 2018 Congressional testimony ===
On April 26, 2018, they appeared at a House Judiciary Committee hearing on alleged filtering practices of social media platforms. Representative Sheila Jackson Lee asked the two women if they had ever received money from the Trump campaign, to which Hardaway responded, "We have never been paid by the Trump campaign." Representative Hakeem Jeffries suggested that they could be committing perjury and showed them a U.S. Federal Election Commission filing which reported that the Trump campaign paid them $1,275 (~$1,710 in 2025) on November 22, 2016, for "field consulting".

Diamond and Silk then stated that the payment was reimbursement for the cost of airplane tickets. Following their testimony, The Huffington Post reported that, according to Trump campaign treasurer Bradley Crate, the payment had been categorized incorrectly. Crate stated, "The Campaign's payment to Diamond and Silk for field consulting was based on an invoice they submitted reflecting their costs for air travel to a Campaign event. The invoice was not supported by accompanying receipts, so as a technical matter, could not be reported as a reimbursement even though its purpose was to make them whole for their out-of-pocket costs." In the same Huffington Post article, it was reported that following a $7,025 payment from the campaign of Paul Ryan primary election challenger Paul Nehlen, Hardaway and Richardson made a campaign video and endorsed Nehlen.

=== Diamond and Silk Act of 2019 ===
In June 2019, House Representative Steve King joined with Diamond and Silk to introduce the Diamond and Silk Act, an anti–sanctuary city bill. When Diamond and Silk were asked what they thought of King retweeting white supremacists, Hardaway responded, "I'm tired of you all playing the race card." The bill failed to pass the House vote and garnered backlash from both left and right-wing media.

The conservative news magazine Washington Examiner criticized King for mocking homelessness and veteran's issues with the bill, and described the Diamond and Silk Act of 2019 as being "named for a clownish YouTube duo who have leveraged their online popularity into regular appearances on Fox News".

== Platforms ==
=== Facebook ===
In an April 2018 tweet and Facebook post, Hardaway and Richardson reproduced a message from Facebook stating that the Diamond and Silk Facebook page's content and brand were deemed to be "unsafe to the community." According to Hardaway and Richardson, the message sent from the Facebook policy team concluded with: "This decision is final and it is not appeal-able in any way." The pair stated that they believed that they had been victims of censorship by Facebook after receiving a communication from the social media website's policy team.

Both women stated they had started questioning Facebook via phone calls, emails, and chat sessions as to their alleged "bias censorship and discrimination against D&S brand page" in September 2017. Both women stated of a reduction in reactions to their posts and videos since that time period, and that followers no longer receive notifications about posts and videos. As of July 2019, their Facebook page stated they had over 2 million followers.

Diamond and Silk's censorship claims were uncritically repeated in right-wing media. According to CNN, their claims likely influenced an April 2018 congressional hearing which involved Mark Zuckerberg after the Cambridge Analytica scandal. Business Insider noted that Diamond and Silk were a "frequent topic" during that hearing. Tennessee Republican Representative Marsha Blackburn finished her questioning of Zuckerberg by stating, "Let me tell you something right now, Diamond and Silk is not terrorism". Texas Republican Representative Joe Barton asked Zuckerberg, "Why is Facebook censoring conservative bloggers such as Diamond and Silk?" Zuckerberg responded that Facebook employees had made an error and they had contacted Hardaway and Richardson.

While there is no evidence that Diamond and Silk were censored or that their page was blocked by Facebook, the pair continued to contend it was. Facebook's own analytics firm showed that the Diamond and Silk page had not lost a significant amount of influence on the social network. By the time that Diamond and Silk spoke at a congressional hearing about their censorship claims, news outlets such as CNN and Business Insider described their censorship claims as debunked. At the hearing, experts testified that there was no evidence that Diamond and Silk had been targeted. According to The Washington Post, "the numbers do not bear out the argument that the sisters have been repressed."

Diamond and Silk stated that Facebook had not contacted them. Facebook said they attempted contact via email, Twitter, phone, and Facebook Messenger. The pair later said that messages sent to them through email should not be expected to be read, because they receive many emails.

=== Fox News ===
Beginning in 2018, the pair produced original content for Fox News and Fox Nation. The pair's content ceased in April 2020; they had last appeared on Fox News and Fox Business in early March. On April 27, The Daily Beast reported that Fox had severed ties with the pair. According to sources at Fox News, the network cut ties with the sisters due to their propagation of misinformation relating to the COVID-19 pandemic.

=== Newsmax TV ===
After leaving the Fox News platform, the duo had a Saturday afternoon show on Newsmax TV titled Diamond and Silk Crystal Clear.

== Books ==
Diamond and Silk wrote Uprising: Who the Hell Said You Can't Ditch and Switch? — The Awakening of Diamond and Silk, published in 2020 by Regnery. The book was on Publishers Weekly Hardcover Frontlist Non-Fiction Bestsellers ranked at No. 17 as of August 28, 2020.

== Hardaway's death ==
On January 8, 2023, Hardaway died at her home in North Carolina. Her death was announced by Trump on Truth Social. She was hospitalized with an unspecified illness in November 2022 before briefly returning to their Newsmax show in December, where she said that the illness was not COVID-19. Richardson took to Twitter afterwards to condemn public figures who were suggesting Hardaway died from COVID, and threatened to sue if they did not retract their statements. Following Hardaway's death, Richardson and other right-wing pundits began promoting conspiracy theories alleging that Hardaway was either murdered or fell victim to vaccine shedding, possibly as part of a depopulation agenda. She later suggested her sister died as a result of a bioweapon being sprayed into the air. However, a death certificate obtained by the Associated Press states that she died from heart disease linked to chronic high blood pressure.

Richardson said that the show would continue and keep the same name, because her sister was still "here in spirit". She told fans that "Diamond cannot be replaced" and they should not send in audition tapes or suggestions for a new co-host. She compared her sister to Colonel Sanders, saying that KFC continued operating under the same name after his death and so would the show.
