= Evelyn McGee Colbert =

American producer and entrepreneur

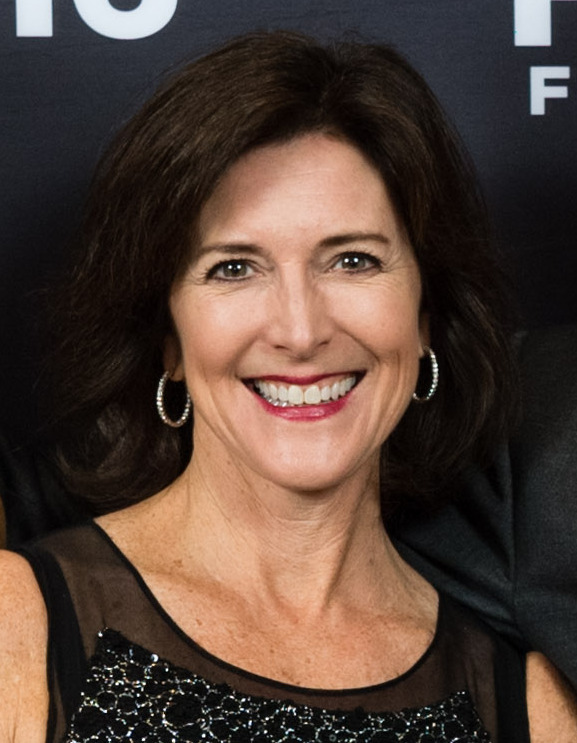
- McGee Colbert in 2016
- Born: Evelyn Brabham McGee; July 23, 1963 (age 63); Charleston, South Carolina, U.S.
- Education: University of Virginia; Circle in the Square Theatre School
- Occupations: Producer; entrepreneur
- Spouse: Stephen Colbert (m. 1993)
- Children: 3
- Parent: Joseph H. McGee

Evelyn Brabham McGee Colbert (née McGee; born July 23, 1963) is an American producer and entrepreneur who works in the arts. She is a founding member and trustee of Montclair Film, she served as president of its board until 2026. The nonprofit organization has hosted the Montclair Film Festival every year since 2011. McGee also serves as vice president of Spartina Productions.

McGee studied to become an actress, but quickly moved to behind the scenes, working as director of development for both the Drama League of New York and the Remains Theater in Chicago. She later founded Spartina Productions alongside her husband, comedian Stephen Colbert. Through Spartina she has served as executive producer for Derek DelGaudio's In and Of Itself and the CBS late night panel show After Midnight. McGee also helped produce The Late Show with Stephen Colbert, from home, during the COVID-19 pandemic. After the show returned to its studio setting, McGee appeared on camera multiple times, often to help Colbert with the segment "First Drafts". With her husband, McGee has co-authored the cookbook Does This Taste Funny? (2024), featuring family recipes.

== Early life ==
McGee was born in Charleston, South Carolina on July 23, 1963, into a Presbyterian Scots-Irish family. Her father Joseph "Peter" McGee (1929–2024) was a former member of the South Carolina House of Representatives and civil litigator, while her mother Evelyn "Patti" McGee (née Moore) (1935–2022), was a high school teacher, philanthropist and gardener. She has an older sister named Madeleine. McGee was named after her mother and grandmother.

As a child, McGee lived at 131 Church St in Charleston, next door to the Dock Street Theatre, and often attended the Charleston edition of the Spoleto Festival, which initiated her interested in the arts. McGee attended Charleston's private, all-female school Ashley Hall, and was salutatorian of her class, graduating in 1981. She later moved to Charlottesville to enroll at the University of Virginia, where she double majored in drama and English, also participating in several Heritage Repertory Theatre summer plays. She studied at the University of Cambridge for her junior year. McGee got her degree from the College of Arts and Sciences in 1985. After graduating, McGee took acting classes at Circle in the Square Theatre School in New York. She lived in student housing at the General Theological Seminary, where she was a roommate of fellow student and future Fox News personality, Martha MacCallum. During this time, she worked for flautist Paula Robison and her husband, violist Scott Nickrenz.

== Career ==
During the mid-1990s, McGee worked as Director of Development at the Drama League of New York and the Remains Theater in Chicago. She appeared alongside husband Stephen Colbert in an episode of Strangers with Candy as his mother. She also had an uncredited cameo as a nurse in the series pilot and a credited one (as his wife Clair) in the film. McGee, alongside Eva Price, produced Yisrael Campbell's comedy Circumcise Me, which had an Off-Broadway run at the Bleecker Street Theater, in November 2009. In January 2011, McGee joined Colbert and actor Jay O. Sanders, for a reading of Harold Pinter's Betrayal, at the Luna Stage in New Jersey. Since 2011, McGee has been a founding board member of Montclair Film, a non-profit that produces the Montclair Film Festival, and acted as president of its board. In April 2026 McGee stepped down from her position, being replaced by board vice-president Mary Anne Vaughn. McGee was named president emeritus and will continue to be involved with the organization as board trustee.

McGee had a cameo appearance, alongside her two sons, in Peter Jackson's The Hobbit: The Desolation of Smaug (2013) and appeared in two episodes of the show Alpha House in 2014. In 2017, McGee joined the board of directors of the International African American Museum located in Charleston. That same year McGee was part of the cast for a representation of "Shostakovich and The Black Monk: A Russian Fantasy", alongside the Emerson String Quartet. She portrayed Dimitri Shostakovich's second wife, Margarita, among other characters. In 2019, McGee reprised her roles at the Segerstrom Center in Costa Mesa. McGee worked with New Jersey Governor Phil Murphy on the Restart and Recovery Commission in 2020. That same year she helped her husband produce the Late Show with Stephen Colbert from their home in South Carolina as a result of the COVID-19 pandemic.

Through Spartina, McGee and her husband served as executive producers for In & Of Itself, a film version of Derek DelGaudio's off-Broadway show of the same name. In 2024, they co-authored, Does This Taste Funny?, a cookbook featuring recipes from their family, centered on Lowcountry cuisine. In 2026 she was awarded the Dean's Cross for Servant Leadership by the Virginia Theological Seminary. That same year Montclair Film named a new award after her, the Evelyn McGee Colbert Visionary Award, of which she is the inaugural recipient. McGee alongside her husband also established the Evelyn McGee Colbert Visionary Fund for the festival.

== Personal life ==
McGee has been married to Stephen Colbert since 1993. McGee met Jon Stewart before she met her future husband in 1990. They met at the world premiere of Hydrogen Jukebox at the Spoleto Festival USA in Charleston. Colbert later described the first moment he met Evie as being a love at first sight encounter. Moments after they met though, they realized they had grown up together in Charleston and had many mutual friends. The couple lives in Montclair, New Jersey, and has three children.

== Published works ==
- Colbert, McGee-Colbert, Does This Taste Funny?: Recipes Our Family Loves (Celadon Books; September 17, 2024), ISBN 978-1250859990
