= Watauga High School =

American public school in North Carolina

Location
- 300 Go Pioneers Drive; Boone, North Carolina 28607; United States; 36°13′01″N 81°39′06″W

Information
- School type: Public
- Established: 1965 (61 years ago)
- School district: Watauga County Schools
- Principal: Scott Strickler
- Staff: 104.56 (FTE)
- Grades: 9–12
- Enrollment: 1,279 (2023-2024)
- Student to teacher ratio: 12.23
- Colors: Light blue, Navy, and White
- Mascot: Pioneer
- Team name: Pioneers
- Website: whs.wataugaschools.org

Watauga High School (WHS) is a public high school in Boone, North Carolina. It is part of the Watauga County Schools district.

== History ==
Watauga High School was established in 1965, following the consolidation of five Watauga County high schools. In 2010, Watauga High School moved to a brand new facility, where it is currently located today.

== Athletics ==
Watauga is a member of the North Carolina High School Athletic Association (NCHSAA) and are classified as a 6A school. The school is a part of the Northwestern 6A/7A Conference. Watauga's school colors are light blue, navy, and white, and its team name is the Pioneers. Sports at Watauga include:

- Cheerleading
- Cross Country
- Football
- Soccer
- Volleyball
- Golf
- Tennis
- Indoor/Outddor Track & Field
- Basketball
- Swimming
- Wrestling
- Baseball
- Lacrosse
- Softball

== Notable alumni ==
- Gregory Bovino, American law enforcement officer
- Jeff Caldwell, professional soccer player
- Daniel P. Driscoll, 26th United States Secretary of the Army
- Ryder Jones, former MLB third baseman and pitcher
- Abraham Morlu, former CFL player and track Olympian who competed at the 2000 Summer Olympics, representing his birth country Liberia
- Jon Steinbrecher, college athletics commissioner
- Brenda Taylor, track and field athlete, competed at the 2004 Summer Olympics
- Michael Whatley, politician, lawyer, and chairman of the Republican National Committee from 2024 to 2025
