= Ryder Jones =

American baseball player

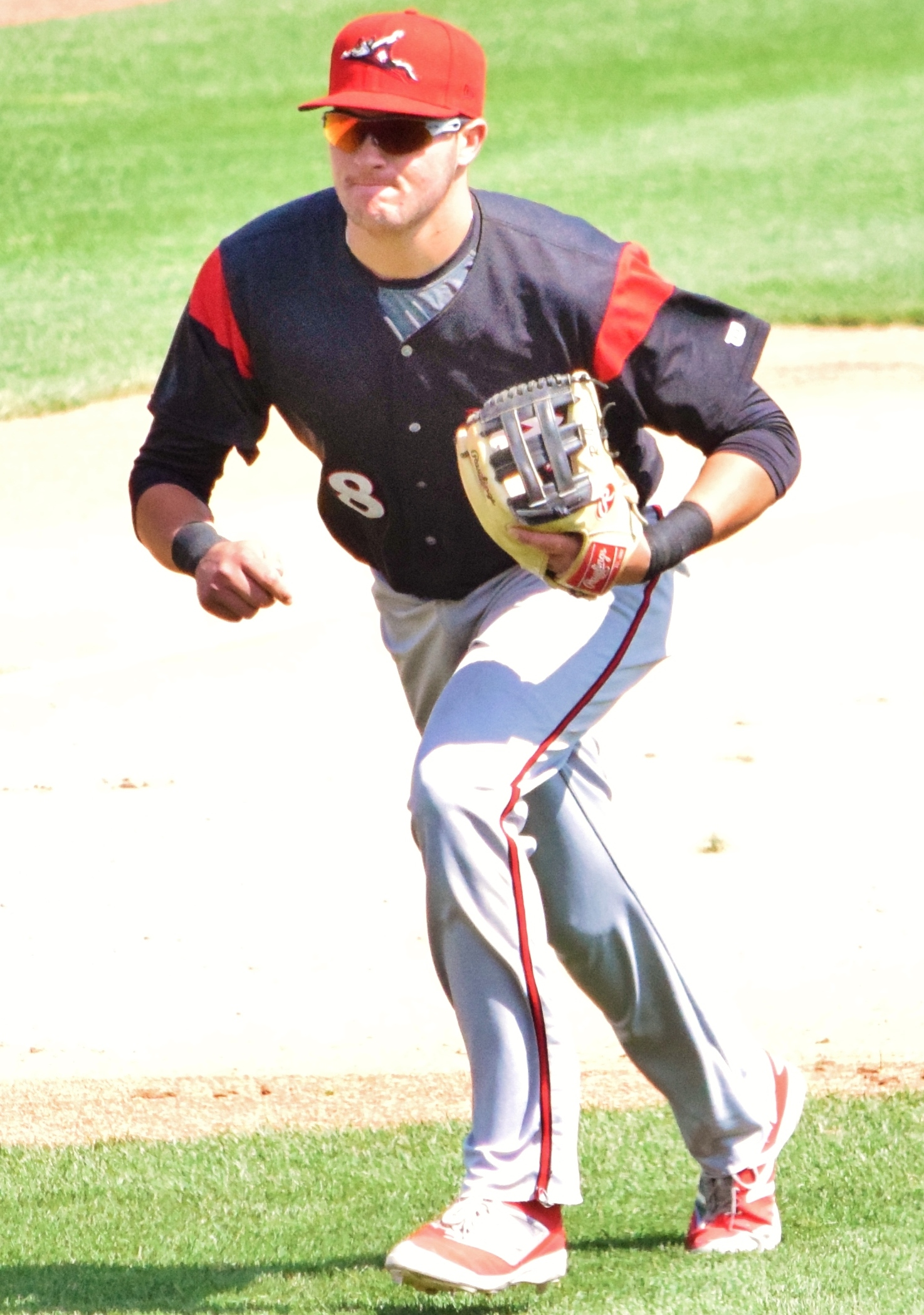
- Jones with the Richmond Flying Squirrels in 2016
- First baseman / Third baseman
- Born: June 7, 1994 (age 32); Seattle, Washington, U.S.
- Batted: Left Threw: Right

MLB debut
- June 24, 2017, for the San Francisco Giants

Last MLB appearance
- September 9, 2018, for the San Francisco Giants

MLB statistics
- Batting average: .184
- Home runs: 4
- Runs batted in: 8
- Stats at Baseball Reference

Teams
- San Francisco Giants (2017–2018)

Ryder McKinley Jones (born June 7, 1994) is an American former professional baseball first baseman and third baseman. He played in Major League Baseball (MLB) for the San Francisco Giants.

== Playing career ==
=== San Francisco Giants ===
Jones attended Watauga High School in Boone, North Carolina and was drafted by the San Francisco Giants in the second round of the 2013 Major League Baseball draft.

He made his professional debut with the Arizona League Giants. Jones played 2014 with the Salem-Keizer Volcanoes and Augusta GreenJackets, 2015 with the San Jose Giants and 2016 with the Richmond Flying Squirrels. After the 2016 season, he played in the Arizona Fall League. Jones started the 2017 season with the Sacramento River Cats.

On June 24, 2017, the Giants promoted Jones to the major leagues. He made his debut later that night, starting at third base against the New York Mets. On June 30, 2017, Jones recorded his first career hit against the Pittsburgh Pirates. Jones played in 53 games for the Giants in 2017 with 40 starts (27 at first base and 13 at third base).

On July 21, 2019, Jones was designated for assignment. After not being claimed by another team, the Giants assigned Jones to their Double-A affiliate the Richmond Flying Squirrels. Jones elected free agency following the season on November 4.

=== Boston Red Sox ===
On February 4, 2020, Jones signed a minor league deal with the Boston Red Sox. He did not play in a game for the organization in 2020 due to the cancellation of the minor league season because of the COVID-19 pandemic. Jones became a minor-league free agent on November 2.

=== Sugar Land Skeeters ===
In August 2020, Jones signed on to play for the Sugar Land Skeeters of the Constellation Energy League (a makeshift four-team independent league created as a result of the COVID-19 pandemic) for the 2020 season. He was subsequently named to the league's all-star team.

=== Arizona Diamondbacks ===
On February 6, 2021, Jones signed a minor league contract with the Arizona Diamondbacks organization. In 2021, Jones appeared in 75 games split between the Rookie-Ball Arizona Complex League Diamondbacks, Double-A Amarillo Sod Poodles, and Triple-A Reno Aces. He hit .288 with 11 home runs and 47 RBI. Jones became a free agent following the season.

=== Chicago White Sox ===
On January 14, 2022, Jones signed a minor league contract with the Chicago White Sox. In 67 games for the Triple–A Charlotte Knights, he slashed .196/.269/.318 with seven home runs and 27 RBI. Jones was released by the White Sox organization on August 3.

=== Atlanta Braves ===
On January 7, 2023, Jones signed a minor league deal with the Atlanta Braves while also announcing that he would be converting to a pitcher. He appeared in 13 games for the High–A Rome Braves, but struggled to a 7.53 ERA with 20 strikeouts in 14 1/3 innings pitched. On July 27, Jones was released by the Braves organization.

== Post-playing career ==
Jones joined the Tampa Bay Rays organization as an area scout in November 2023.
