= Jon Steinbrecher =

Athletics commissioner

Current position
- Title: Commissioner
- Conference: Mid-American Conference

Biographical details
- Born: February 23, 1961 (age 65)
- Education: Valparaiso University (BA, BS); Ohio University (MSA); Indiana University, Bloomington (PhD)

Administrative career (AD unless noted)
- 1994–2003: Mid-Continent Conference (commissioner)
- 2003–2009: Ohio Valley Conference (commissioner)
- 2009–present: Mid-American Conference (commissioner)

Jon A. Steinbrecher (born February 23, 1961) is the current commissioner of the Mid-American Conference (MAC) of the National Collegiate Athletic Association (NCAA) Division I collegiate athletic conference. He has held the position since 2009. He was previously the commissioner of the Ohio Valley Conference.

== Personal life ==
Steinbrecher attended Watauga High School in Boone, North Carolina. He then attended Valparaiso University, where he played both football and tennis and earned a Bachelor of Science degree in physical education and journalism, graduating in 1983.

In 2006, he received an Alumni Achievement Award from his alma mater, and in 2014 was inducted into the Valparaiso University Athletics Hall of Fame. Steinbrecher graduated with a master's degree in sports administration from Ohio University in 1984, and he was awarded a doctorate in physical education in sports administration from Indiana University Bloomington in 1989.
