= Dummycrats =

2018 American political documentary

- Produced by: Kyle Olson
- Starring: Diamond and Silk
- Release date: October 15, 2018
- Running time: 77 minutes
- Country: United States
- Language: English

Dummycrats is a 2018 political documentary featuring Diamond and Silk. It was produced by Kyle Olson of the American Mirror Media Company. The film opened nationwide on October 15, 2018, at 800 theaters for one night only. It was postponed from a September 2018 opening.

== Cast ==
- Diamond and Silk

== See also ==
- Death of a Nation (2018)
