= Joseph H. McGee Jr. =

American politician (1929–2024)

Member of the South Carolina House of Representatives from the Charleston County district
- In office 1963–1968

Personal details
- Born: Joseph Halstead McGee Jr. April 6, 1929 Charleston, South Carolina, U.S.
- Died: April 27, 2024 (aged 95) Sullivan's Island, South Carolina, U.S.
- Party: Democratic
- Spouse: Evelyn Moore (m. 1960)
- Children: Madeleine McGee; Evelyn McGee Colbert
- Education: Washington and Lee University
- Occupation: Lawyer

Joseph Halstead "Peter" McGee Jr. (April 6, 1929 – April 27, 2024) was an American politician in the state of South Carolina. He served in the South Carolina House of Representatives from 1963 to 1968, representing Charleston County, South Carolina. He was a lawyer and judge. McGee helped protect Charleston's Four Corners of Law. He was the father-in-law of comedian Stephen Colbert.

== Early life ==
McGee was born on April 6, 1929, in Charleston, South Carolina. He was brought up in the city as an only child, by his father, Joseph Halstead McGee, a trust officer at a local bank, and Madeleine Gendron McGee (née Stoney), a housewife. McGee recalled that his house at 4 King Street had no central heating; instead they burnt coal in two rooms and had "a Franklin-type oil-burning stove" in the middle of the dining room. McGee was childhood friends with J. Palmer Gaillard Jr., who went onto become mayor of Charleston from 1959 to 1975.

He attended Miss Sadie Jervey's private one-room school for two years, elementary at the Craft School, and later went to Charleston High School, graduating in 1945. He received his bachelor degree from Washington and Lee University in 1950, and two years later his bachelor of laws. There, he was awarded the Algernon Sydney Sullivan Award and was a member of Sigma Nu. McGee joined the United States Navy in 1952, and from July 1953 to July 1955, he served as a Lt. J.G. aboard of the USS Wasp (CV-18).

== Career ==
=== Law ===
He was admitted at the South Carolina Bar in 1956. Shortly after he joined as a lawyer at the firm of Moore & Mouzon. In 1964 he became a partner of what became Moore, Mouzon & McGee, until 1970. That year, he and his childhood friend Ben Moore joined Henry and Augustin Smythe to form Buist, Moore, Smythe & McGee, PA. During his years practicing law, McGee served as Chairman of the Executive Committee of the South Carolina Bar Association in 1971. From 1980 to 1981, he served as the president Charleston County Bar Association, and became President of the SC Bar Senior Lawyers Division in 2002. A year later he was recognized with the Bar Association’s DuRant Distinguished Public Service Award. McGee was admitted to the American College of Trial Lawyers in 1991.

=== Political career ===
From 1963 to 1968, McGee served as a member of the South Carolina House of Representatives from the Charleston County district, for three two-year terms. He was First Vice-Chair of the Judiciary Committee from 1966 to 1968. As Vice-Chair of the South Carolina Tri-centennial Commission from 1966 to 1971 he led efforts to negotiate the purchase, raise the funds, and plan for the creation of Charles Towne Landing. Of his state tenure, McGee has said: "I never ever regretted the service, but I never ever regretted the decision to get out when I did. I ran because as a young lawyer it was an opportunity for me to get better known, but the participation in the legislative process was an education, and it was a great pleasure. I enjoyed it. I saw things I didn’t like and I saw things I didn’t approve of. But by and large we had good state government."

From 1971 to 1975 he served one term at the Charleston City Council with mayor J. Palmer Gaillard Jr.

=== Advocacy and volunteering ===
McGee served on the Evening Post Publishing Company’s Board of Directors for twenty years. McGee worked closely with Historic Charleston Foundation's director, Frances Edmunds, which led to the nation's first historic preservation plan in 1974.

== Personal life and death ==
McGee married Evelyn 'Patti' Moore in 1960, and had two daughters, Madeleine and Evelyn. They remained married until her death, on November 11, 2022, after a long illness. He and his wife lived in Charleston until 2015, when they moved to a house in Sullivan's Island. McGee and his family were parishioners of Charleston's Second Presbyterian Church. He died April 27, 2024, at the age of 95.

== Awards and honors ==
In 2021, McGee received the Order of the Palmetto, the highest civilian honor awarded by the governor of South Carolina. In 2023, the Historic Charleston Foundation, created a new award named after McGee, which recognizes excellence in advocacy, community preservation and planning. In 2024, a renovation of the park at Wragg Square, in front of Charleston's Second Presbyterian Church, was made in honor of McGee and his wife. The park also features a plaque conveying their love of the community.
