= Real News Update =

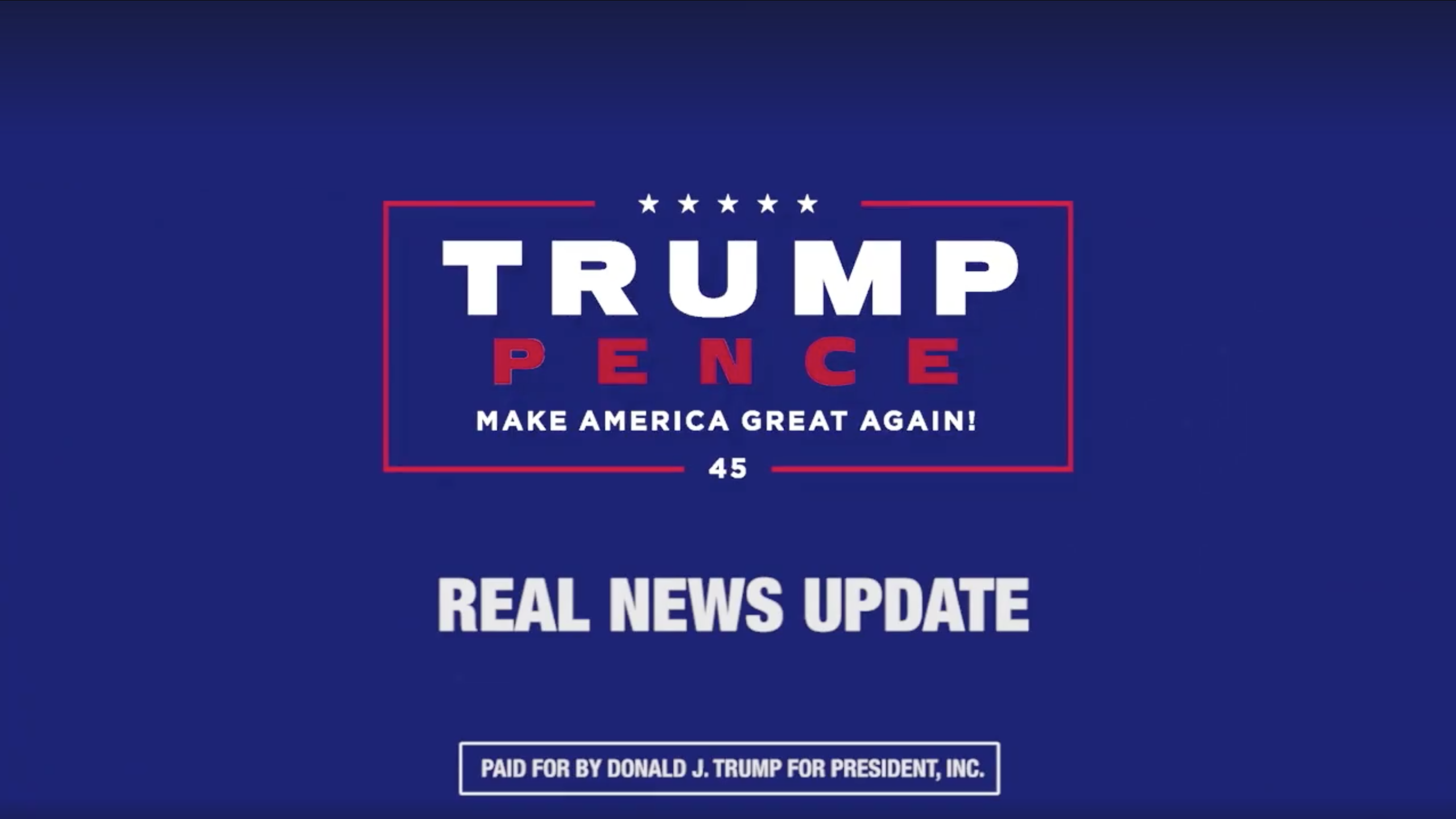
- Genre: Campaign advertising
- Starring: Lara Trump; Kayleigh McEnany; Katrina Pierson
- Country of origin: United States
- Original language: English
- No. of episodes: 110

Production
- Production locations: Trump Tower; New York, New York

Original release
- Release: July 30, 2017 – March 15, 2020

Real News Update was a weekly webcast that lasted from July 30, 2017, to March 15, 2020, to support the first presidency of Donald Trump and his 2020 presidential campaign. The show was available on Trump's Facebook, Twitter and YouTube accounts and was hosted by his daughter-in-law, Lara Trump, wife of Eric Trump. It was presented in the form of a short newscast lasting from one to five minutes, and delivered updates on the accomplishments of his presidency.

== Background ==
Lara Trump played an integral role in the 2016 presidential campaign of Donald Trump and was regarded by many as a 'secret weapon' in securing a Republican Party victory in North Carolina that year, in support of her father-in-law.

Following Donald Trump's inauguration in January 2017, she disparaged the mainstream news media for excessively negative coverage of his presidency. She also criticized CNN, ABC, CBS and NBC for refusing to air a May 2017 advertisement that listed his accomplishments during his first 100 days as president.

Lara began work on Donald Trump's re-election effort shortly after his inauguration, working alongside Michael Glassner. By March 2017, she was hired as a senior consultant by the digital vendor for Trump's campaign, and would quickly become a prominent figure in his 2020 presidential campaign.

Vox has speculated that Real News may be a partial fulfillment of Trump's plan to launch his own news network, an idea that has been dubbed "Trump TV".

== Launch/ending ==
Real News Update launched its first video via Facebook on July 30, 2017, featuring an introduction by Lara Trump in which she states, "I bet you haven't heard about all the accomplishments the president had this week because there's so much fake news out there. We wanted to give you a glimpse into his week."

In an interview shortly after the show's launch, she explained that the show's objectives were to serve as an outlet for under-reported positive news of Donald Trump's presidency and to curtail the general public's dependence on mainstream media.

The show ended in March 2020 around the time of when government restrictions due to the COVID-19 pandemic began in the United States.

== Production ==
The webcasts were funded by the Trump 2020 re-election campaign and filmed in a studio on the 15th floor of Trump Tower. While Lara Trump was the primary anchor of the program, various other media and political figures also hosted the show, including Joy Villa, Steve Rogers, and Harlan Hill.

Kayleigh McEnany, who later served as President Trump's press secretary, also hosted the program on August 6, 2017, one day after leaving her position at CNN.

== Reception ==
Political analyst Jeff Greenfield likened Real News Update to the "long and if not entirely noble tradition" of political campaigning, though Dylan Byers at CNN remarked that it differs from previous political campaign media in seeking to discredit mainstream media and to advertise itself as a reliable alternative.

BuzzFeed and Snopes reported that, despite the stated objectives of Real News, various news items on the program, such as Trump's donation of his second-quarter salary to the Department for Education and Foxconn's plans to build a factory in Wisconsin, did, in fact, receive coverage in mainstream media.

Digital news website Salon criticized the webcast as political propaganda.

Aaron Blake of The Washington Post described an episode of Real News Update as "real spin, at best" and that it "felt a lot like propaganda -- or state TV."

Comedian and The Late Show host Stephen Colbert similarly likened the program to "state-sponsored propaganda", and compared it to his show's recurring sketch Real News Tonight—a newscast presented with an exaggerated bias towards Trump. He proceeded to present an edition of the sketch that used clips from Real News Update to make Lara interact with its anchor characters, who referred to Lara as their new "special correspondent".

== See also ==
- America First Policies
- Donald Trump on social media
- Media bias
- Truth Social
- My View with Lara Trump, Fox News show hosted during the second Trump presidency
