= Michael Whatley =

American politician and lawyer

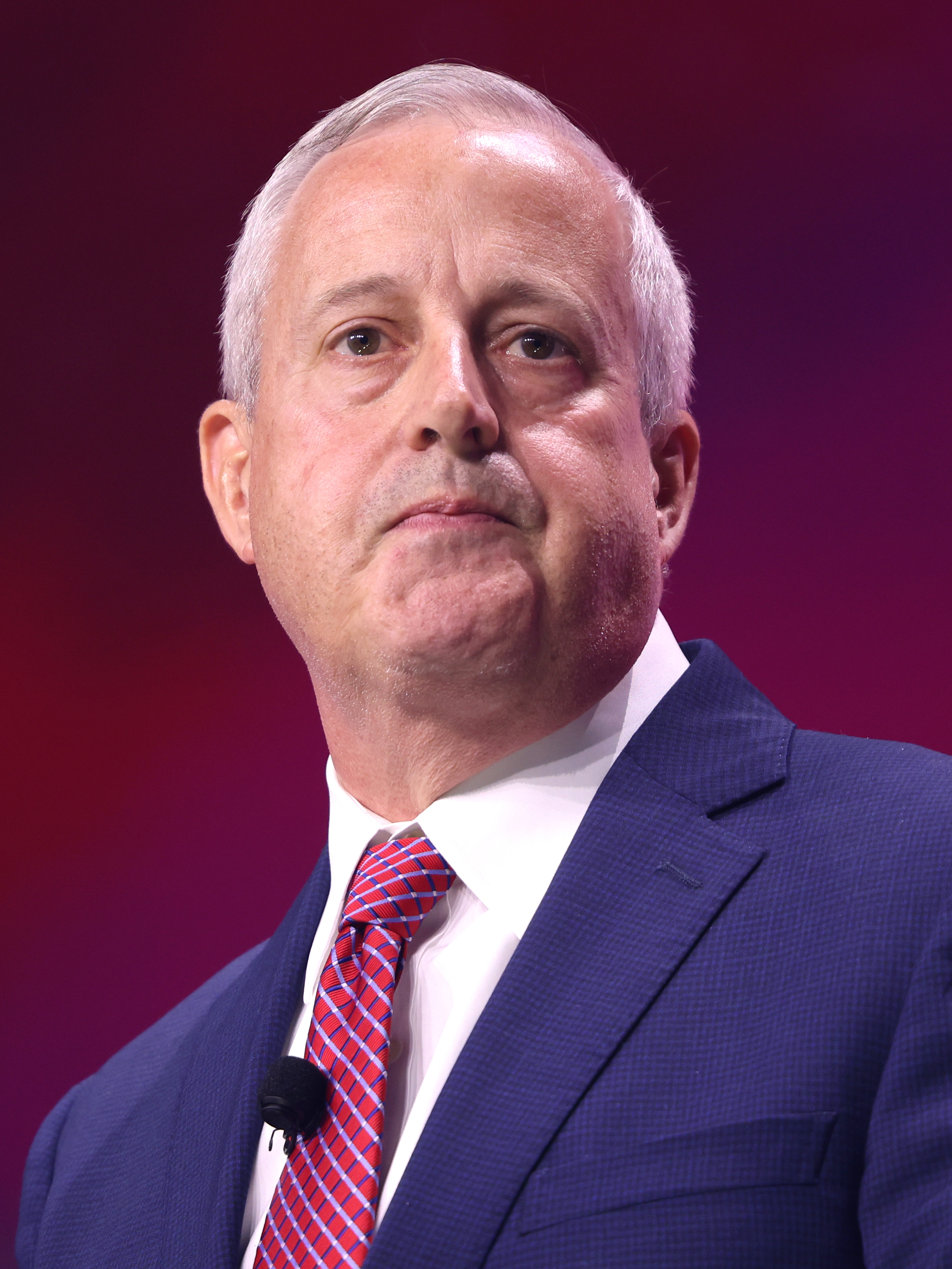
- Whatley in 2025

66th Chair of the Republican National Committee
- In office March 8, 2024 – August 22, 2025
- Preceded by: Ronna McDaniel
- Succeeded by: Joe Gruters

Chair of the North Carolina Republican Party
- In office June 8, 2019 – March 8, 2024
- Preceded by: Robin Hayes
- Succeeded by: Jason Simmons

Personal details
- Born: Michael David Whatley; October 1, 1968 (age 58) Lansing, Michigan, U.S.
- Party: Republican
- Education: University of North Carolina, Charlotte (BA); Wake Forest University (MA); University of Notre Dame (MA, JD)
- Website: Campaign website
- Whatley's voice's voice Whatley at an event in Rocky Mount, North Carolina. Recorded March 13, 2026

Michael David Whatley (born October 1, 1968) is an American politician and lawyer who was chair of the Republican National Committee from 2024 to 2025. He previously served as chair of the North Carolina Republican Party from 2019 to 2024.

Whatley earned a bachelor's degree from the University of North Carolina, Charlotte, a master's degree from Wake Forest University, and a second master's and a Juris Doctor degree from the University of Notre Dame. After working on George Bush's successful 2000 presidential campaign, Whatley served in the Department of Energy under his administration. From 2004 to 2007, he was chief of staff to Senator Elizabeth Dole. In 2019, Whatley was elected chair of the Republican Party of North Carolina, serving until his election as RNC Chair in 2024.

Whatley was the Republican nominee for the United States Senate in the 2026 election in North Carolina, losing in a landslide with 39.18% of the vote to Democrat Roy Cooper's 58.64% in the general election.

== Early life and education ==
Michael David Whatley was born on October 1, 1968, in Lansing, Michigan, and moved during his early high school years to Watauga County, North Carolina, where his father was an accountant and his mother was a librarian. Whatley graduated from Watauga High School in 1987. He graduated from the University of North Carolina at Charlotte with a bachelor's degree in history in 1991 and from Wake Forest University with a master's degree in religion in 1993. He then earned a master's degree in theology in 1994 and a Juris Doctor degree in 1997 from the University of Notre Dame.

Whatley began working in Republican Party politics when he volunteered on the 1984 reelection campaign of U.S. senator Jesse Helms while he was a sophomore at Watauga High School.

== Political career ==
=== White House and Capitol Hill ===
In 2000, Whatley was a member of George W. Bush's team pursuing the Florida recount. During Bush's presidency, Whatley served in the United States Department of Energy as deputy assistant secretary. In 2004, he became chief of staff for U.S. Senator Elizabeth Dole, replacing Frank Hill. In 2007, Whatley became a partner at lobbying firm HBW Resources, where he lobbied for oil and gas industry clients. In 2008, he became executive vice president for the Consumer Energy Alliance; he held the position until 2019. In 2016, Whatley helped Republican presidential nominee Donald Trump campaign and organize rallies in North Carolina.

=== North Carolina Republican Party chair ===
In June 2019, the North Carolina Republican Party selected Whatley to succeed Robin Hayes as their chair.

Following the United States Capitol attack on January 6, 2021, Whatley refused to blame Trump, saying that only those who participated in the riots bear responsibility. In February 2021, Whatley said, "We certainly saw evidence of voting irregularities, of election counting irregularities in a number of places around the country", and that the reason Trump won North Carolina was his state party's vigilance against Democrats' attempts to cheat. Also in February 2021, the state party voted unanimously to censure Senator Richard Burr for voting to convict President Trump during his second impeachment.

=== Republican National Committee chair ===
The Republican National Committee appointed Whatley as its general counsel in February 2023. In February 2024, Donald Trump endorsed Whatley to replace Ronna McDaniel as chair of the RNC. In March 2024, Whatley was elected as the new chair of the RNC, along with Lara Trump as his co-chair. Per the North Carolina party's 2022 plan of organization, its vice chair (Susan Mills) served as state chair until a successor was elected. During his tenure as chair, the Republican party won the presidency as well as a U.S. Senate and House majorities in the 2024 United States elections.

In January 2025, Whatley was reelected as chair.

== 2026 U.S. Senate campaign ==
President Donald Trump's September 2026 announcement that he endorses Whatley

On July 24, 2025, press reports announced that Whatley would run for U.S. Senate with President Trump's support. He vacated his position as chair of the RNC while running for the Senate seat.

Whatley says he supports tax cuts for the middle class as well as no taxes on tips, overtime, and Social Security. Whatley is supportive of the Iran war and the steep tariffs enacted by Trump.

Party political offices
Preceded by Aubrey Woodard; Acting	Chair of the North Carolina Republican Party; 2019–2024	Succeeded by Susan Mills; Acting
Preceded by Ronna McDaniel	Chair of the Republican National Committee; 2024–2025	Succeeded by Joe Gruters
Preceded by Thom Tillis	Republican nominee for U.S. Senator from North Carolina (Class 2); 2026	Most recent
