= The Late Show with Stephen Colbert =

American late-night talk show (2015–2026)

- Also known as: The Late Show; A Late Show with Stephen Colbert (Note: Also known as A Late Show with Stephen at Home (COVID-19 pandemic; March 2020 – June 2021))
- Genre: Late-night talk show; News/political satire
- Created by: David Letterman
- Developed by: Stephen Colbert; Jay Katsir; Opus Moreschi
- Written by: Ariel Dumas; Jay Katsir
- Directed by: Jim Hoskinson (2015–25); Yvonne De Mare (2025–26)
- Presented by: Stephen Colbert
- Announcer: Jen Spyra
- Music by: Louis Cato and the Great Big Joy Machine (Note: Led by Jon Batiste as Stay Human from 2015 to 2022. Led by Louis Cato as Louis Cato and the Late Show Band from 2022 to 2026, and as Louis Cato and the Great Big Joy Machine in 2026.)
- Opening theme: "Everyone (Intro)" (2015–16); "Humanism" by Stay Human (2016–26)
- Ending theme: "I'm from Kenner"; "The Art of the Bumper"
- Country of origin: United States
- Original language: English
- No. of seasons: 11
- No. of episodes: 1,801 (list of episodes)

Production
- Executive producers: Stephen Colbert; Jon Stewart; Chris Licht; Tom Purcell; Barry Julien
- Production locations: Ed Sullivan Theater, Manhattan, New York City (Note: Filmed in Colbert's homes in New Jersey and South Carolina during the COVID-19 pandemic from 2020 to 2021)
- Camera setup: Multi-camera
- Running time: 40 minutes
- Production companies: Spartina Productions; Busboy Productions (Note: Uncredited); CBS Broadcasting Inc.

Original release
- Network: CBS
- Release: September 8, 2015 – May 21, 2026

Related
- The Colbert Report; Our Cartoon President; Tooning Out the News

The Late Show with Stephen Colbert is an American late-night news talk show hosted by Stephen Colbert, which aired from September 8, 2015, to May 21, 2026. The show was the second and final iteration of CBS's Late Show franchise. It was taped at the Ed Sullivan Theater in New York City in the same studio as its predecessor Late Show with David Letterman. It aired new episodes live to tape in most American markets Mondays to Thursdays at 11:35 p.m. ET/PT/10:35 p.m. CT, as with its competitors Jimmy Kimmel Live! and The Tonight Show Starring Jimmy Fallon.

Colbert was announced as the new host in April 2014, following the exit of host David Letterman, who had announced intentions to retire earlier in the month. Colbert previously hosted Comedy Central's The Colbert Report, a news satire program where Colbert portrayed a character named Stephen Colbert as a parody of conservative pundits. As such, the series carried a stronger focus on discussing and satirizing current events, especially within American politics. Some of Colbert's staff moved to The Late Show, along with Jon Stewart – who previously hosted The Colbert Report's parent series The Daily Show – serving as an executive producer.

The Late Show became the highest-rated American late-night talk show, and held that ranking for nine consecutive seasons, marking the longest such streak in franchise history. It had exceeded The Tonight Show in key demographic viewership since 2019.

CBS announced in July 2025 that The Late Show with Stephen Colbert would end in May 2026, and that the Late Show franchise would be retired permanently after a 33-year run – 22 seasons under Letterman and 11 seasons under Colbert. CBS described the move as a "purely a financial decision" and claimed The Late Show was losing $40 million per year. The announcement attracted controversy due to the show's relative popularity among late-night television viewers, as well as the close proximity of the timing to the merger of Skydance and Paramount. The show was known for its frequent criticism of the Trump administration.

The series finale aired on May 21, 2026, as an extended episode. CBS sold the time slot to Byron Allen's Allen Media Group via a time buy agreement.

== Background ==
Prior to Colbert's assumption of hosting duties, David Letterman had been host of Late Show for 22 years, dating to his arrival at CBS in 1993. CBS had not had a regular late-night talk show for most of its existence before that point, with only one attempt (the short-lived The Pat Sajak Show in 1989–1990) between 1972 and Letterman's arrival. Letterman, who joined CBS from NBC after ending his eleven-year run as host of Late Night and losing out on being Johnny Carson's successor on The Tonight Show to Jay Leno, was initially competitive with his show's bitter rival, The Tonight Show with Jay Leno; Letterman's Late Show slowly experienced a decline in ratings over the course of the 1990s and 2000s, dating back to an affiliation agreement between New World Communications and Fox that resulted in all nine CBS-affiliated stations it owned or recently acquired switching to Fox between September and December 1994, relegating the network to lower-rated former Fox affiliates and independent stations in many major cities.

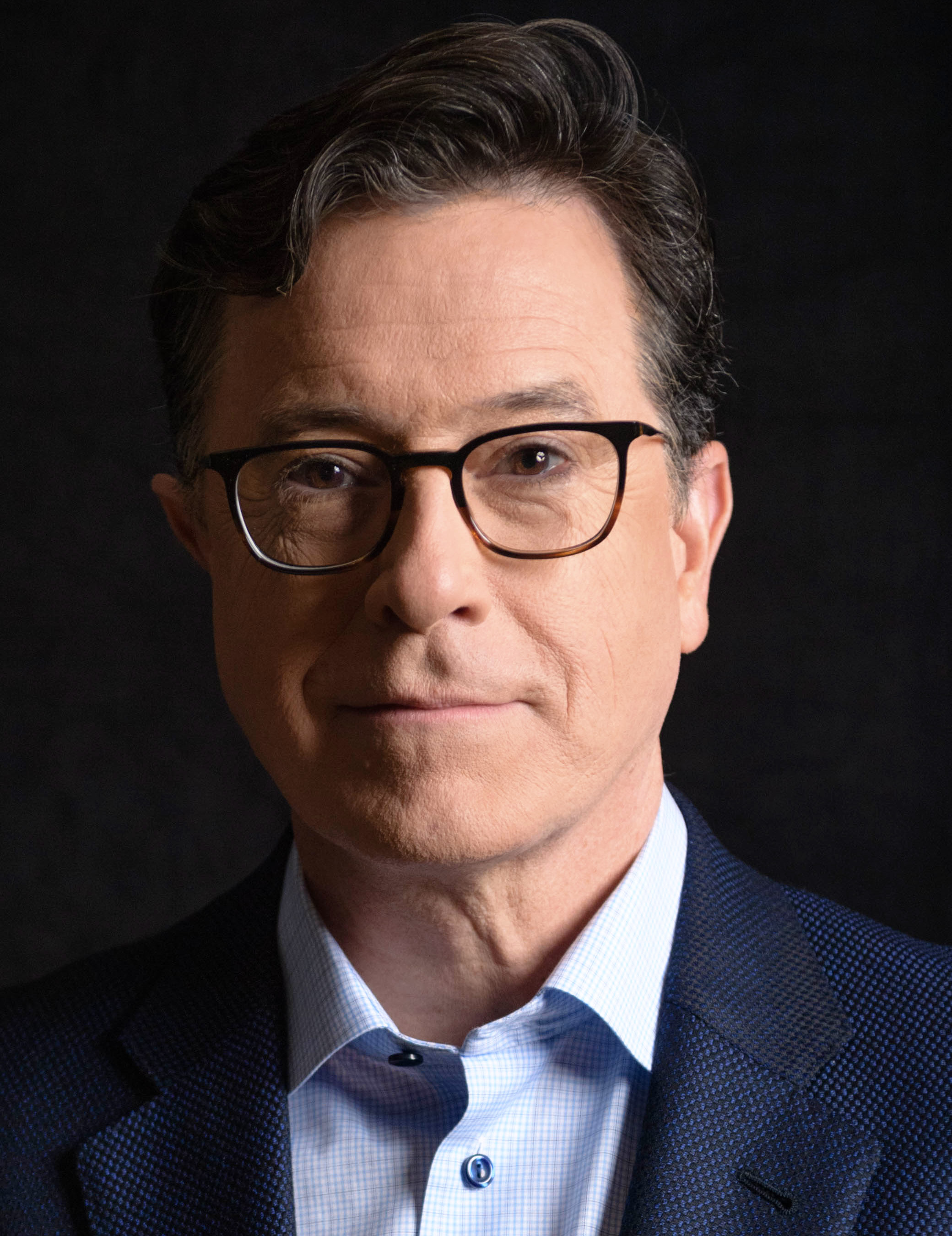
Stephen Colbert hosted his satirical news show, The Colbert Report, which won seven Primetime Emmy Awards on Comedy Central, from October 2005 to December 2014.

According to TV by the Numbers, in February 2013, the live-plus-seven-day ratings for Letterman's Late Show averaged about 3.1 million per show for the 2012–2013 season to date. A year later, average viewership was down to 2.8 million. Late Show also had the oldest audience among the various late-night talk shows, which may have led to CBS's decision to pick a younger replacement for Letterman to compete with The Tonight Show Starring Jimmy Fallon and ABC's Jimmy Kimmel Live!. In addition, Colbert's previous program did well among college students and young men 18–34, which are prime target audiences for late-night comedy programming.

On April 3, 2014, Letterman announced his retirement, with his final episode as host of Late Show scheduled for May 20, 2015. On April 10, 2014, CBS announced Stephen Colbert as Letterman's successor, signing him to a five-year agreement. In contrast with Colbert's previous program The Colbert Report, in which he played a fictionalized version of himself, Colbert hosts the show as himself. Colbert's version retains the Late Show name under license from Letterman's Worldwide Pants, which holds the registered trademark. On April 23, 2014, the character version of Stephen Colbert appeared on The Daily Show with Jon Stewart to announce that he had clearly "won television" and would be closing down The Colbert Report because he had met his goal. This came after the announcement the character would not be used after the end of The Colbert Report. The final episode of Report aired on December 18, 2014.

There were efforts to lure a new version of The Late Show from its long-time home at the Ed Sullivan Theater in New York City, with California lawmakers offering tax incentives to bring production to Los Angeles. On July 23, 2014, CBS CEO Les Moonves announced that the program would remain in New York City; CBS would be eligible for $11 million in tax credits over five years to produce the program there, and would also receive grants to fund renovations to the theater. Jon Batiste was announced as the bandleader on June 4, 2015, with his Stay Human band succeeding the CBS Orchestra (which returned to its previous identity as the World's Most Dangerous Band shortly thereafter) as the house band.

=== Promotion ===
In anticipation of the program's premiere, a new online presence was launched for The Late Show in June 2015, including new social media accounts, a podcast, mobile app, and a monologue-styled video focusing on the beard Colbert had grown since leaving The Colbert Report. Throughout the remainder of the summer, videos would continue to be released through the show's official YouTube channel and mobile app. On July 1, 2015, Colbert hosted a special edition of a public access program in Monroe, Michigan, interviewing Eminem.

== Production ==
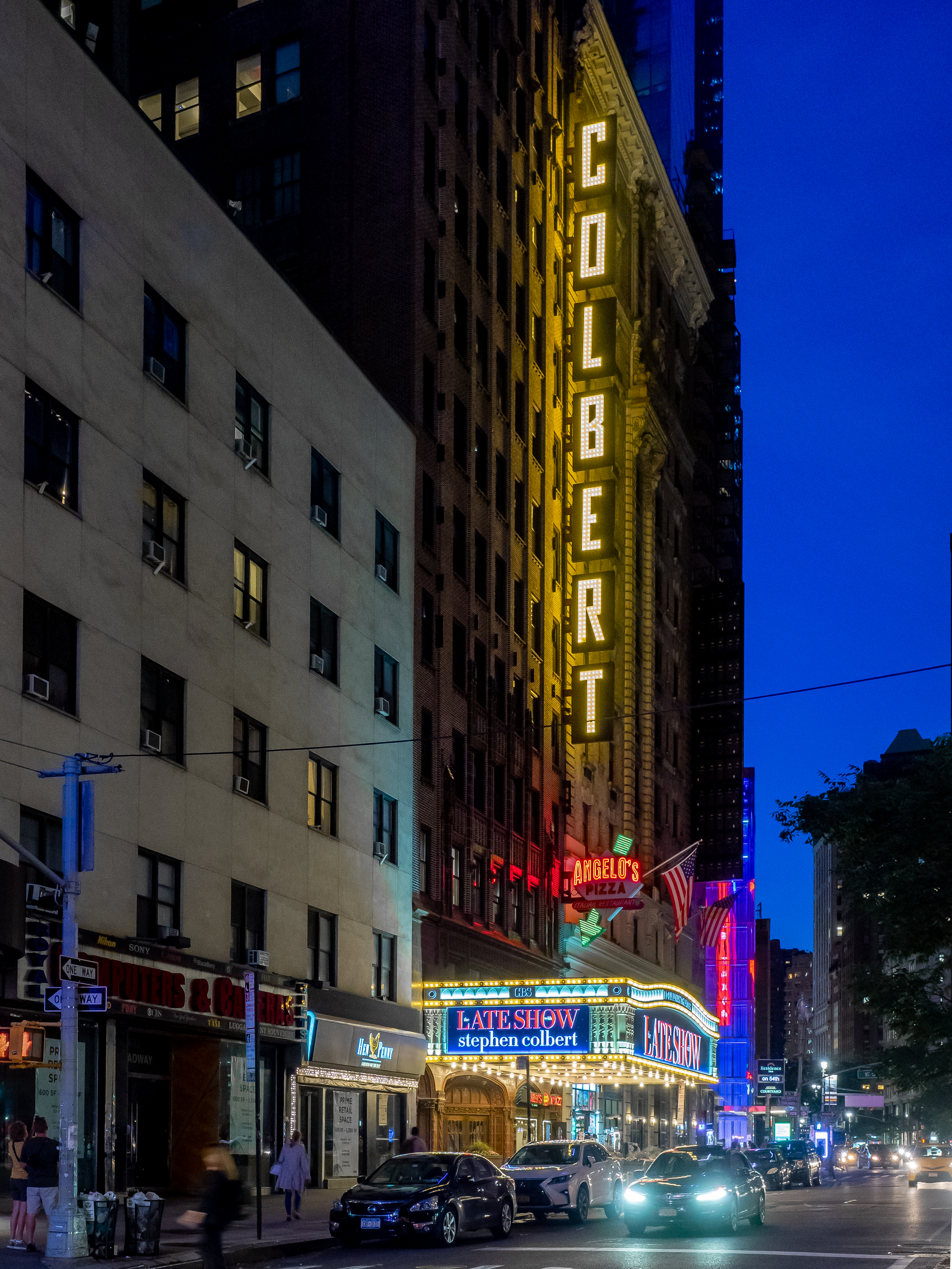
The Ed Sullivan Theater's marquee

Colbert was given near-full control of the show, with little interference from CBS management in regard to format. Colbert brought most of his staff from The Colbert Report with him to The Late Show, as well as outsiders such as Brian Stack, who is best known for his work on Conan O'Brien's programs, and Jon Stewart, former host of Colbert's previous sister program The Daily Show, who was credited as executive producer. Colbert no longer used the character he had portrayed on The Colbert Report, jokingly remarking to Jeb Bush that "I used to play a narcissistic conservative pundit – now I'm just a narcissist."

The Ed Sullivan Theater underwent a full restoration to its original 1927 appearance, a process that began following Letterman's final episode, including the uncovering of the theater's ceiling, stained-glass windows and a restoration of a chandelier, due to advances in technology that allow less sound and video equipment to cover up the auditorium's architectural details.

On April 13, 2016, former CBS This Morning and Morning Joe executive producer Chris Licht was named showrunner for The Late Show; CBS had shown concerns that, despite improved ratings in comparison to Letterman's tenure, Colbert had a weak online presence in comparison to The Tonight Show Starring Jimmy Fallon, and Colbert's lead-out The Late Late Show with James Corden (whose "Carpool Karaoke" segments have been popular as viral videos). The Hollywood Reporter believed that Licht's experience in news programming would be leveraged to complement Colbert's strengths in topical and news-oriented material.

On October 17, 2019, Colbert and CBS announced that they had agreed to renew his contract, which had been set to expire in August 2020, until August 2023. On March 12, 2020, the show suspended production due to the COVID-19 pandemic in the United States. Beginning March 30, 2020, the show was produced from Colbert's home, billed as A Late Show with Stephen Colbert (or A Late Show with Stephen at Home). From August 10, Colbert presented the program from a smaller set within the building's office tower, built as a replica of his own personal office seen on A Late Show with Stephen Colbert, without a studio audience. On August 4, 2020, the show's music producer Giovanni Cianci was fired following sexual misconduct allegations.

On May 24, 2021, Colbert announced that the show would resume production inside the theater with an audience fully vaccinated against COVID-19 starting on June 14, 2021. It was also announced that the Ed Sullivan Theater would be back at full capacity, following the lifting of COVID-19 guidelines that restricted the number of people in a crowded, indoor setting. The announcement was significant in that the Ed Sullivan Theater would become the first theater on Broadway to reopen to full capacity. It also made The Late Show the first late-night talk show to announce a return to a full audience, though The Tonight Show ultimately returned to full-capacity audiences one week ahead of The Late Show on June 7, 2021. With the show's return to the theater, the original name, The Late Show with Stephen Colbert, was also put back in use.

The program's intro originally used tilt–shift photography featuring scenes of New York City, making the city appear like a miniature model. In September 2021 The Late Show introduced a new intro sequence, featuring the use of a drone camera flying around the theater and its backstage areas. On February 26, 2022, Chris Licht, the showrunner, left the show to become the new chairman and CEO of CNN. On the August 11, 2022, episode, Colbert announced that bandleader Jon Batiste had decided he would not be returning to the show, in order to "pursue personal and professional interests". Batiste was replaced by Louis Cato. On May 2, 2023, The Late Show, and several other late night talk shows, halted its production due to the 2023 Writers Guild of America strike. Colbert showed his support to the writers, saying: "I'm a member of the guild. I support collective bargaining. This nation owes so much to unions" and hoped both parts would reach an agreement. It was reported that Colbert continued to pay his staff salary during the strike. In November/December 2023, The Late Show production paused for a few weeks after Colbert had emergency surgery for a ruptured appendix. Full episodes of the show going back about a month are available on Paramount+. Official clips from the show going back to 2015 are available on the show's YouTube channel.

The Late Show with Stephen Colbert was directed by Jim Hoskinson for ten years, from the first episode in September 2015. He stepped down in September 2025, replaced in the last eight months by Yvonne De Mare, who had served as associate director for the show's run. Both had formerly worked at The Colbert Report. On February 16, 2026, Louis Cato and the Late Show Band was renamed Louis Cato and the Great Big Joy Machine in preparation for the release of a charity album in April 2026.

=== Live broadcasts for special events ===
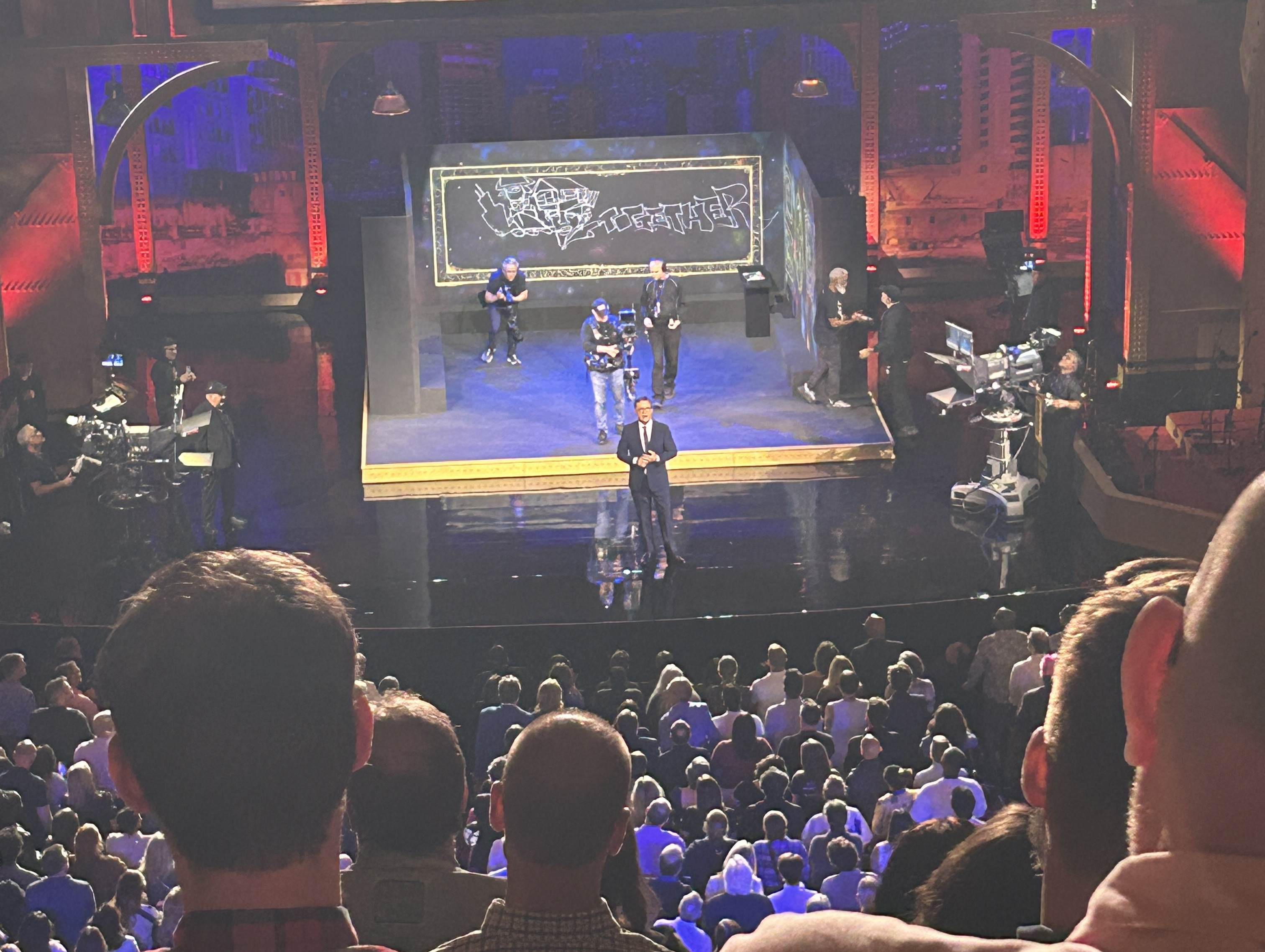
Colbert on-stage for a live broadcast filmed at the Auditorium Theatre in Chicago during the 2024 Democratic National Convention

While most episodes were pre-taped before broadcast, the series occasionally broadcast live on the evenings of pre-scheduled newsworthy domestic events. These have included live shows during the evenings of Election Days, presidential nominating conventions, United States presidential general election debates, State of the Union speeches and similar presidential speeches to joint sessions of Congress, and the July 2022 hearings of the January 6 Committee. During the 2024 Democratic National Convention, the show filmed a week of live episodes from the Auditorium Theatre in Chicago, the host city of the convention.

An election night special for the 2016 United States presidential election was aired on CBS's sibling channel Showtime. In 2020 and 2024, presidential election night specials were broadcast on CBS. Colbert also aired live specials on CBS on the election nights of the midterm elections of 2018 and 2022. On the evening of January 6, 2021 (originally slated for a pre-taped episode), the program broadcast a previously unplanned live episode in order to air remarks by Colbert in reaction to the attack on the United States Capitol earlier that day.

In addition to political events, live episodes were also broadcast as the lead-out programming for NFL postseason games, including the 2024 AFC Championship Game and Super Bowls in 2016 and 2024 (being the direct lead-out to Super Bowl 50 in 2016).

== Format ==
Colbert originally started the show with a cold open and brief monologue before the opening sequence. Starting with the April 18, 2016, broadcast, the first under new showrunner Chris Licht, the format was modified to replace the cold open monologue with short sketches starring Colbert, his staff, and often featuring that night's guests, followed by the opening sequence and Colbert entering the stage. For the first few weeks of the show, Colbert performed his own voiceovers for the intro. Since then he has used Jen Spyra, former writer for the show, as his off-screen announcer; the first female late night announcer.

The open was originally followed by an extended news satire style desk sequence with a run-through of recent headlines, in a manner reminiscent of television newscasts and that of The Colbert Report. This has been revised to a traditional stand-up monologue presentation, but still composed of the same extended run-through of news headlines, with a particular focus on politics. Also, the show follows the same basic format as other late-night talk shows including the use of sketch comedy, guest interviews and musical performances. Colbert's guest list includes more political and government figures than his contemporaries; his first two weeks' guests included visits from Jeb Bush, Joe Biden, Ban Ki-moon, Stephen Breyer, Bernie Sanders, Elizabeth Warren, Donald Trump, and Ted Cruz.

Colbert did not have any of his staff act as a sidekick or straight man on the program. While Colbert danced and physically interacted with his band leader while the band played, they only occasionally engaged in on-air banter, unlike David Letterman's relationship with Paul Shaffer or the relationship of other late-night hosts with their announcers or bandleaders. Occasionally, Colbert brought out producers of his show, or enlisted the help of audience members, who assumed a sidekick-like role for single segments, engaging in light dialogue about a topic. The show has occasionally been broadcast live to provide coverage of the immediate aftermath of major political events, such as candidate debates and party conventions during election years, the State of the Union address, in the 2018 mid-term elections and the 2020 United States presidential election.

== Episodes ==
=== Notable episodes ===
In the show's series premiere, Colbert welcomed actor George Clooney and politician Jeb Bush, thanked former host David Letterman, and joined singer Mavis Staples and numerous other musicians for a rendition of Sly and the Family Stone's "Everyday People". The episode nearly missed its broadcast due to technical difficulties. An early interview with Vice President Joe Biden received particular acclaim. Following the terrorist attacks in Paris that November, Colbert devoted his program to that city. A special football-themed episode aired as the lead-out program for Super Bowl 50 in 2016, featuring guests President Barack Obama (in a taped segment), Tina Fey, Margot Robbie, Will Ferrell, and Megyn Kelly.

In February 2016, model Sarah McDaniel appeared for an interview on the show after being featured on the first ever non-nude cover of Playboy magazine. A minor wardrobe failure caused McDaniel to have to visibly cover her cleavage. Colbert attempted to joke about the situation to ease the awkwardness, and at one point playfully put a paper towel on her chest, a move McDaniel later criticized in an interview with HasanAbi. She described the entire incident as one of the worst moments of her life. A clip of the interview posted on YouTube has more than 48 million views and is by far the most watched video ever posted to The Late Show's YouTube channel, as of 2024.

On June 22, 2016, CBS announced that The Late Show would broadcast two weeks of live episodes during the 2016 Republican and Democratic conventions. The first of these episodes, on July 18, 2016, opened with a musical number by Colbert that compared the Republican convention to being "Christmas in July", and featured sketches where Jon Stewart (revealed to have been living off-grid in a cabin) is told that Donald Trump had clinched the Republican nomination for the presidential election, Colbert's persona from The Colbert Report is revived and delivers an edition of The Word on "Trumpiness", and a filmed sketch touring the convention's venue as his The Hunger Games-inspired character Julius Flickerman. Stewart appeared once more the following Thursday, delivering a segment criticizing the Fox News Channel in the wake of the firing of its CEO Roger Ailes. Colbert's performances during these episodes were critically praised for their return to an emphasis on news-oriented comedy similar to The Colbert Report and The Daily Show.

On November 8, 2016, Colbert presented a live, election night special for CBS's sister premium channel Showtime, Stephen Colbert's Live Election Night: Democracy's Series Finale: Who's Going to Clean Up This Shit? The special featured appearances by Laura Benanti (reprising her impersonation of Melania Trump), Jeff Goldblum, Mark Halperin, Elle King, John Heilemann, and Nick Offerman. Due to it being broadcast on a premium channel, the show was billed as being uncensored (which Colbert demonstrated during his monologue by swearing and announcing Marco Rubio's Senate re-election result using a nearly nude model). Critics felt that the special had anticipated a Hillary Clinton victory, noting the increasingly "surreal" and "uncomfortable" atmosphere that ensued when Trump emerged as the front-runner. When Halperin informed Colbert that Trump was nearing the required 270 electoral votes, he remarked that he "[couldn't] put a happy face on it, and that's my job." Katy Perry was expected to make a pre-recorded appearance, but her segment was dropped due to the impending victory. During his interview, Jeff Goldblum also acknowledged the situation and sang a verse from "It Goes Like It Goes". In his closing monologue, Colbert noted that before she died, his mother Lorna (who was born only days after the first presidential election where women had the right to vote nationally) remarked that – despite having historically been a Republican – she had wanted to vote for Hillary Clinton. He argued that people may have "overdosed" on the "poison" of politics, but acknowledged that "you can't laugh and be afraid at the same time, and the devil cannot stand mockery." Another abandoned gag from the special was, had Clinton won, Colbert would have brought out nude models with the letters "W-E-'-R-E W-I-T-H H-E-R" printed on their butt cheeks. When it became clear that Trump was going to win, they initially thought of changing the lettering to "W-E-'-R-E S-C-R-E-W-E-D", before it was decided not to use the gag.

On May 1, 2017, Colbert's monologue was devoted to President Trump following his conduct in an interview with CBS's John Dickerson on Face the Nation. Describing Dickerson as a fellow "member of the CBS family", Colbert "read a laundry list of insults on-air to rapturous cheers from the crowd ... reeling off a series of scripted jokes and ending on, 'In fact, the only thing your mouth is good for is being Vladimir Putin's cock holster.'" Colbert's language was considered to be crude and homophobic by some, and led to a short-lived #FireColbert hashtag on Twitter. Colbert later addressed the controversy on-air, admitting he had used "a few words that were cruder than they needed to be" but that he "would do [the monologue] again". On May 5, the Federal Communications Commission announced that it would go through a comprehensive investigation of Colbert's remarks, and concluded no action was to be taken against Colbert or The Late Show, reasoning in a public statement released on May 23 that there was "nothing actionable under the FCC's rules" as the offending statement had been properly censored.

During the COVID-19 pandemic when the show was produced from Colbert's home (March 2020 until June 2021), his wife Evelyn "Evie" McGee-Colbert was a frequent guest appearance on the show. Crucial to maintaining Colbert's energy as a host, Evie stood in for the regular studio audience's reactions and laughter. On November 3, 2020, Colbert produced his second Showtime election special, Stephen Colbert's Election Night 2020: Democracy's Last Stand: Building Back America Great Again Better 2020. Ahead of the special, showrunner Chris Licht told The Hollywood Reporter's TV's Top 5 podcast that the show would be prepared for every eventuality. The special featured many of the same guests who had attended the 2016 election night special, notably Charlemagne tha God; unlike the 2016 show, the prolonged nature of the election projections in 2020 meant that Colbert could not reasonably prognosticate on a winner during the live show – Americans would not know the winner until later in the week. The special won the 2021 Emmy Award for Outstanding Variety Special (Live).

On September 30, 2025, Jimmy Kimmel appeared as a guest on the show in his first interview since his show's suspension. The candid interview included Kimmel discussing his reaction to the suspension as well as to Colbert's cancellation. On the same night, Colbert was a guest on Jimmy Kimmel Live! which was broadcast from Brooklyn that week. Colbert filmed his appearance on Jimmy Kimmel's show first and then the two traveled to the Ed Sullivan Theater to film Kimmel's interview.

In light of warnings from Federal Communications Commission chairman Brendan Carr that the fairness doctrine might apply to the talk show, CBS suppressed Stephen Colbert's interview with candidate James Talarico. It was then presented on YouTube, garnering far more views than it might have gotten if it had been aired on CBS. This was said to be "the Streisand effect."

The Late Show's final Monday episode (May 18, 2026) was titled "The Worst of The Late Show." Before a studio audience made up solely of show staff, Stephen posited that, since the show had more than enough content for a "best of" episode that viewers could already watch on YouTube, the episode would instead feature sketches, field pieces, and other content that never previously made it to air due to weak quality and/or time contraints. The "Worst of" episode's centerpieces included a cold-open sketch featuring Michael Keaton in a $15,000 pigeon costume; a 2024 visit by Stephen to his old apartment in Chicago; a return visit by "Shriekin' Joe" (Brian Stack), who did appear on the show but at the expense of viewer interest (weak ratings charts were shown for veracity); and a performance of "It's Raining Fish," a parody song penned by writer Michael Cruz Kayne and set to the tune of "It's Raining Men", with Colbert, Cruz Kayne, and Paul Shaffer (David Letterman's Late Show bandleader, who penned the original tune for The Weather Girls) providing vocals. At Colbert's request, the entire unedited "Worst of" show was posted on YouTube (in addition to the individual segments), and included performances by Louis Cato and the Great Big Joy Machine in lieu of commercial breaks.

Also during the final week, on May 20, 2026, Colbert answered his own personal questions from his popular segment, "The Colbert Questionert". The questions were asked by his friends, Billy Crystal, "Weird Al" Yankovic, Josh Brolin, Martha Stewart, Mark Hamill, Jim Gaffigan, Jeff Daniels, Tiffany Haddish, Amy Sedaris, Ben Stiller, Aubrey Plaza, James Taylor, Robert De Niro, John Dickerson (who presided over the segment), and Colbert's wife Evelyn McGee Colbert.

==== Final episode ====
"We love doing this show for you, but what we really really love is doing this show with you."

— Stephen Colbert to his audience leading off the final Late Show (May 21, 2026)

The Late Show aired its final episode on May 21, 2026, a show that was extended to 79 minutes with commercials (rather than the normal 60) and featured cameo appearances throughout the show, including Bryan Cranston, Paul Rudd, Tim Meadows, Tig Notaro, Ryan Reynolds, Neil deGrasse Tyson, Jon Stewart, Andy Cohen, Elijah Wood, Jimmy Fallon, Jimmy Kimmel, Seth Meyers, and John Oliver, with Sir Paul McCartney being the show's final guest. The episode also featured performances by Louis Cato (alongside the Great Big Joy Machine), original Late Show bandleader Jon Batiste, Elvis Costello and McCartney and ended with a final rendition of "Hello, Goodbye".

== Cancellation controversy ==
On June 13, 2023, CBS announced that Colbert had signed a three-year contract extension through 2026. In May 2025, CBS executive George Cheeks said of Colbert's pending contract expiration and possible renewal: "We have another year on [his] deal. We have not had that conversation, but we really like our hand." He also noted at the time that "we have the number one person at 11:30pm for the last nine years" but that "the day part is challenging from an ad sales perspective."

Colbert and CBS announced on July 17, 2025, that the show and franchise was scheduled to end when Colbert's contract expires in May 2026. CBS stated that the cancellation was "purely a financial decision against a challenging backdrop in late night" and that it was "not related in any way to the show's performance, content or other matters happening at Paramount." Ankler Media reported that Colbert's manager was informed at the end of June about the cancellation, but did not tell Colbert until he returned from vacation two weeks later. Puck reported that "Colbert's team" was first informed around July 4, 2025, that the show – losing $40 million a year – was in jeopardy. The final decision to cancel was relayed to Colbert on July 16, and Colbert opted to reveal the news the next day, earlier than CBS had intended.

The decision was made while Paramount, owner of CBS, was in the process of closing a multibillion-dollar merger with Skydance, which required the approval of the Federal Communications Commission (FCC). Skydance CEO David Ellison is the son of billionaire Larry Ellison, who is a friend and supporter of Donald Trump. The decision also became public days after CBS and Paramount agreed to pay $16 million to settle a lawsuit by President Donald Trump, a settlement that Colbert had criticized on July 14, 2025, as "a big fat bribe".

As a result, the cancellation attracted significant controversy and criticism. According to The Hollywood Reporter, the news of the show ending was met "with shock and disgust" from politicians and entertainers. Questions arose as to whether the cancellation of Colbert, a trenchant and vocal critic of Trump, was related to the government's review of the merger or to the legal settlement with Trump, who had previously called for Colbert's contract to be "terminated". Senator Elizabeth Warren issued a statement saying: "CBS canceled Colbert's show just three days after Colbert called out CBS owner Paramount for its $16 million settlement with Trump — a deal that looks like bribery. America deserves to know if his show was canceled for political reasons." Senator Adam B. Schiff, who happened to have appeared on the show the day of the announcement, said of the decision: "If Paramount and CBS ended The Late Show for political reasons, the public deserves to know" and later submitted a letter to the FCC asking about what role it might have played. The Writers Guild of America also called on Attorney General of New York Letitia James to investigate the circumstances of the cancellation. In an official response to a letter from Senator Warren, Senator Bernie Sanders and Senator Ron Wyden, Skydance Media said it was not involved in the decision.

Despite being number one in its timeslot, the Late Show was reportedly losing the network money due to high costs and audience fragmentation, digital competition, and falling ad revenue for network and late-night shows. Ad revenue for network late-night talk shows collectively dropped 50% from $439 million in 2018 to $220 million in 2024. Washington Post columnists Emily Yahr and Geoff Edgers elaborated on audience fragmentation, mentioning that due to the social media era, late-night television was no longer appointment viewing for many people, and personalities and celebrities that had made names for themselves via newer media outlets became more influential.

Journalist Bill Carter, a long-time observer of the late-night television industry, acknowledged that advertising revenue for late-night television had diminished over the previous years for all networks, noting that NBC had cut costs by reducing production of the Tonight Show to four nights a week and cut the budget of Late Night, but observed that "CBS did not try any of those cost-saving moves—or any cost-saving moves at all. It simply cut off the franchise at the neck", despite the fact that the Late Show was number one in its time slot. Carter compared the cancellation to CBS's cancellation of the successful Smothers Brothers Comedy Hour in 1969 due to pressure from the Johnson administration.

In his first public remarks following the Skydance-Paramount merger's closing, Cheeks suggested that the end of After Midnight in March 2025 helped lead to the cancellation decision, although executives declined to confirm the show's exact financial losses. Incoming Paramount Skydance executive Jeff Shell stated that 80 percent of the viewership was now on YouTube with lower ad rates. The New York Times reported that Paramount Chair Shari Redstone was not consulted about the decision, and that the show's financial issues had been discussed in board meetings over the previous year. In September 2025, Redstone added that late night programming "was financially not viable, it had been that way for a long time." The cancellation was also cited during an investigation of the merger by House Democrats in August 2025.

Donald Trump reacted to the cancellation by posting "I absolutely love that Colbert got fired. His talent was even less than his ratings," adding, "I hear Jimmy Kimmel is next. Has even less talent than Colbert!"; Kimmel himself would be suspended by ABC following controversial remarks made about the assassination of Charlie Kirk. Kimmel had posted in support of Colbert, criticizing CBS for their decision, saying "Love you, Stephen. Fuck you and all your Sheldons, CBS." (Note: That September, Jimmy Kimmel Live! was pulled off the air that year by its network, ABC, after Kimmel made comments regarding the assassination of Charlie Kirk, which led to scrutiny by the chair of the FCC as well as Nexstar Media Group, which owns multiple ABC affiliate stations.) In August 2025, a For Your Consideration billboard in California for Jimmy Kimmel Live! targeted at the voters in the upcoming 77th Primetime Emmy Awards had the message "I'm voting for Stephen", with both shows nominated in the same category. Kimmel later commented in an interview that the idea the show was losing $40 million was "beyond nonsensical", suggesting affiliate fees should also be considered in addition to ad revenue. In regard to the network's position that the decision was a financial one, former host David Letterman stated, "I'm just going to go on record as saying: They're lying ... They're lying weasels."

As news spread of the cancellation hours ahead of the show's next airing, Colbert's episode on July 17, 2025, was the highest rated episode of the calendar year with 3.08 million viewers, followed by over 5 million views on YouTube It also led to ratings increases the following week across all late-night talk shows. His 12-minute opening monologue the following Monday on July 21 received over ten million views on YouTube. In his first week after the cancellation announcement, he had the highest raw ratings in over two years with an average of 3 million viewers and the highest viewership share of its entire run, with viewership hitting a four-year high for airings in the month of July. Two months after the cancellation, Colbert told GQ, "I think we're the first number one show to ever get canceled."

Following Colbert's finale, CBS defended its cancelation of The Late Show and its subsequent sale of its time slot to Allen Media Group for $15 million for the following season as the network continued to evaluate what to do with the time slot in the long term, saying: "With this 'time buy' model, we have shifted an hour that was losing roughly $40 million annually to $15 million in profit — a $55 million swing."

=== Impact on CBS ===
The replacement of Late Show with Comics Unleashed has resulted in lower ratings for CBS in the late night slot, with an initial drop of 65% compared to the same slot one year earlier, according to Nielsen, as well as knock on effects in other dayparts. A negative impact was also anticipated for the ratings of both CBS' morning show, CBS Mornings, and the late local news on CBS affiliates. According to journalism professor Michael Socolow, a "popular late-night program would provide a lift to a morning show" as viewers would still have their televisions tuned to the same station if they turn it back on in the morning "and they wouldn't switch channels the next time they turned on the TV unless they did not like what they were watching." Late-night shows can also provide a boost to the late local news shows that precede them on the network when viewers tune in to a station early in anticipation of the late-night program. A month after the end of The Late Show, CBS Mornings was reported to be having its "worst June ever" with an 11% decrease in total viewership. The drop followed both the replacement of Colbert with Comics Unleashed and the firing of Scott Pelley by CBS News.

== Reception ==
=== Ratings and viewership ===
The Late Show debuted to 8.26 million viewers (with Live+7) according to Nielsen, beating out all late-night competition. The show's highest ratings to date – and highest for the Late Show franchise – were achieved by a live episode that ran after Super Bowl 50 in 2016, which averaged 21.1 million viewers. Despite this, the show's initial ratings trailed its competitors. The show began to shift its focus onto politics, and in 2017 began to see major ratings gains, aided by the program's satire of the incoming Donald Trump administration. After Trump's inauguration, Colbert narrowly beat Fallon for the first time in average weekly viewership, and it continued to see ratings gains over the ensuing months. It ended up becoming the highest-rated late-night talk show for the 2016–2017 season, averaging more than 3.2 million nightly viewers. The show continued to see improvement throughout the 2010s; in the 2018–2019 season, The Late Show beat The Tonight Show as the top program among the key demographic of adults 18–49, marking its first win in Colbert's tenure, and only the second in franchise history, since the 1994–1995 season. The Late Show was the highest-rated American late-night talk show for nine consecutive seasons up until its cancellation in 2025, making it the longest winning streak in franchise history over its competitors.

=== Reviews ===
The Late Show with Stephen Colbert garnered mostly positive reviews. The Guardian's Brian Moylan praised the show's humor: "This opener was by no means a perfect show, but there were enough really inventive jokes to make Colbert already seem like an innovator." Robert Lloyd of the Los Angeles Times deemed it a "strong start", while Variety's Brian Lowry felt it a "mostly terrific" debut, commenting, "Colbert looks like he has the skill set to settle in and make this job his own, night in and night out." Many critics considered the show's more political segments to be reminiscent of The Colbert Report. The show's post-Super Bowl episode in 2016 proved polarizing. "Sunday's live episode felt mostly like a wasted opportunity – one that probably won't win many converts among those football fans sober enough to stick around," said Brian Lowry at Variety. Daniel D'Addario of Time dubbed his performance "stiff and uncomfortable", writing, "Colbert might have been better advised not to bother trying with football at all and just put forward a program of pure entertainment."

The Late Show received positive reviews following the inauguration of Donald Trump as president. "Colbert may not be the sarcastic, irony-laden character he once played for Comedy Central, but as Trump has dominated the news every day since taking office, The Late Show has become the home for reasoned, but incisive, discussion, on the perceived overreaches of the White House," said David Sims of The Atlantic. James Poniewozik of The New York Times commented, "Mr. Colbert's comedy hasn't become radically different, but it has been franker and caustic ... The network-TV Mr. Colbert is cheerier than his cable character. But it's as if the Trump administration had solved the problem of reconciling his new comedy with his old by making truthiness America's official language." In a profile made by The Wall Street Journal on Colbert, actor Andrew Garfield said: "The openness and ownership that he has with seemingly culturally taboo subjects, such as grief, allows his guests permission to be in contact and reveal those aspects of their own selves and experiences. In turn, the audience gets to have a genuine, deep, and connected experience. So, the show feels like an act of service to people. I think Stephen would have made a great priest."

Others suggested that Colbert's transition to mainstream broadcast dulled his wit. Jason Zinoman, eulogizing the show post-cancellation for the New York Times, praised Colbert for his strong interviewing skills but suggested that one "[gets] the sense that the Late Show wasn't always the perfect showcase for his myriad talents. His quick, improv-honed wit and intellectual depth could feel hamstrung by the show's short segments." In The Guardian, Jesse Hassenger argued that Colbert "did his strongest political satire [in the past]," referencing the Comedy Central days, but also complimented his growth on Late Show: "his warmth and sometimes-sharp humor made him a good host."

=== Accolades ===
The Late Show was a recipient for the Peabody Award and earned Primetime Emmy Award nominations including six times for Outstanding Variety Talk Series, as of the 75th Primetime Emmy Awards. The show won the Primetime Emmy Award for Outstanding Variety Talk Series at the 77th Primetime Emmy Awards. Colbert received a standing ovation as a presenter at the beginning of the awards show.

== International broadcasts ==
In Canada, The Late Show with Stephen Colbert aired on Global, previously airing in simulcast with CBS in most regions. NTV, another Canadian station, also simulcast Global's broadcast to Newfoundland as well as The Bahamas and Saint Pierre and Miquelon. Since September 2023, the show aired at 12:05am or following Global's late evening newscast. In Australia, The Late Show with Stephen Colbert aired on Network 10 (a sister Paramount network).

In Southeast Asia, The Late Show with Stephen Colbert aired on RTL CBS Entertainment weeknights at 10:50 pm (UTC+08:00) starting September 10, 2015, preceding The Late Late Show with James Corden. In India and Sri Lanka, The Late Show with Stephen Colbert airs on STAR World Premiere HD. In Portugal, The Late Show with Stephen Colbert airs on SIC Radical. In Germany, The Late Show with Stephen Colbert aired since January 2020 on Sat.1 Emotions. In South Africa the show airs at 11:00 pm Monday to Thursday, and Friday nights at midnight, on free-to-air e.tv, since October 2019. The American Forces Network satellite radio and television service broadcast the show commercial-free to United States military personnel stationed overseas on Prime Atlantic for viewers in Europe and on Prime Pacific for viewers in Asia.

== See also ==
- Whose Boat Is This Boat?, a satirical children's book produced by The Late Show, based on quotations from Donald Trump
