= Lara Trump =

American television producer (born 1982)

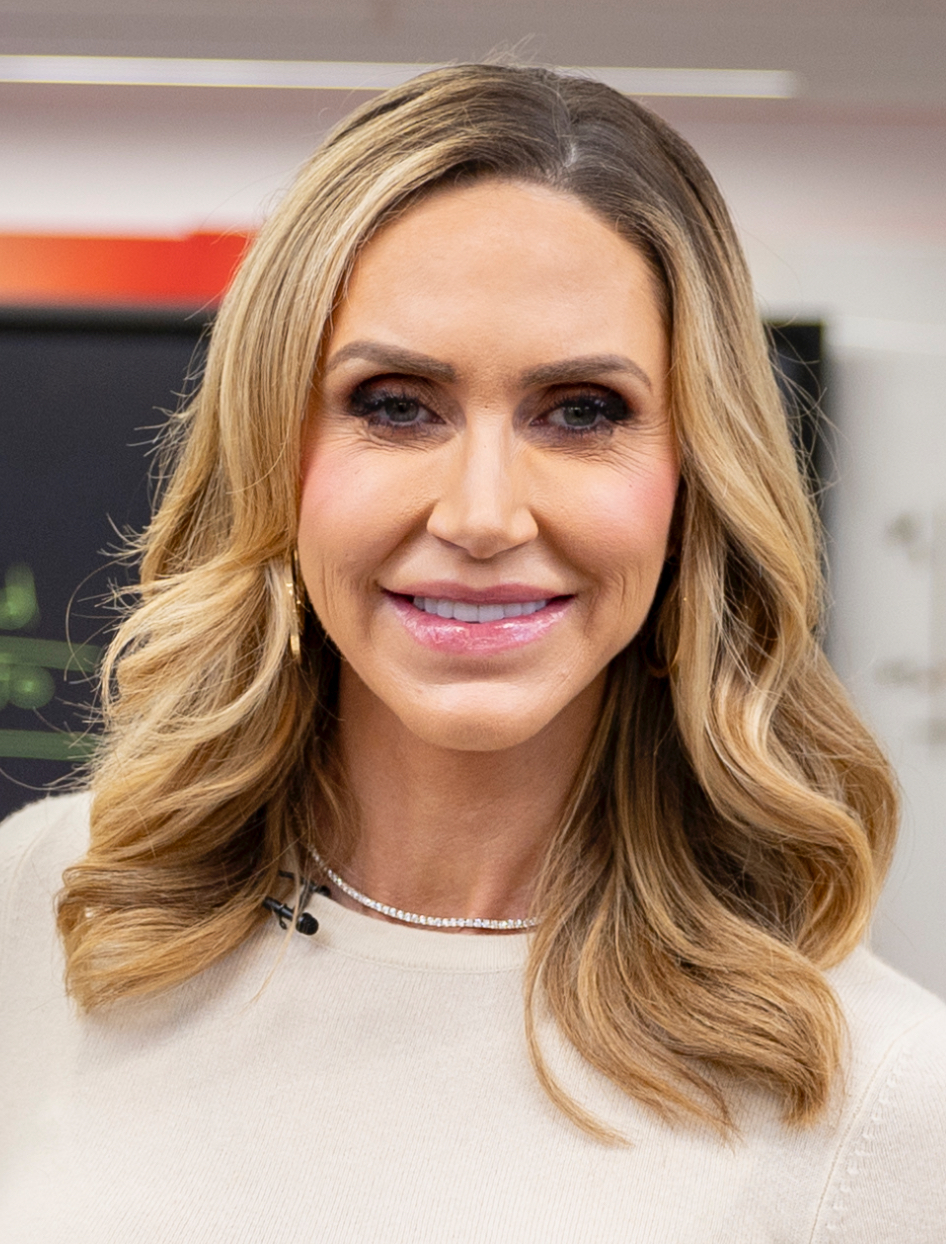
- Trump in 2025

Co-Chair of the Republican National Committee
- In office March 8, 2024 – January 17, 2025
- Chair: Michael Whatley
- Preceded by: Drew McKissick
- Succeeded by: KC Crosbie

Personal details
- Born: Lara Lea Yunaska; October 12, 1982 (age 44) Wilmington, North Carolina, U.S.
- Party: Republican
- Spouse: Eric Trump (m. 2014)
- Children: 2
- Relatives: Trump family (by marriage)
- Education: French Culinary Institute (AA); North Carolina State University (BA)

Lara Lea Trump (née Yunaska; born October 12, 1982) is an American political figure who is the former co-chair of the Republican National Committee. She is married to Eric Trump, the third child of Donald Trump, the 45th and 47th president of the United States. She was the producer and host of Trump Productions' Real News Update and a producer of Inside Edition. On February 22, 2025, Trump debuted her talk show My View with Lara Trump on Fox News.

== Early life and education ==
Lara Yunaska was born in Wilmington, North Carolina, on October 12, 1982, to Linda Ann Sykes and Robert Luke Yunaska, a shipbuilder. She has a younger brother, Kyle Robert Yunaska. She attended Emsley A. Laney High School. She graduated cum laude with a bachelor's degree in communications from North Carolina State University and also studied at the French Culinary Institute in New York.

== Career ==
Trump was a story coordinator and producer for the TV news magazine Inside Edition from 2012 to 2016. In 2014, she married Eric Trump. In March 2021, she joined Fox News as a contributor.

In December 2022, Fox News announced that it had parted ways with Lara Trump, because it has a policy to not employ anyone running for office, or involved with a candidate; her father in-law, Donald Trump, had declared his presidential re-election bid for the 2024 election the month before.

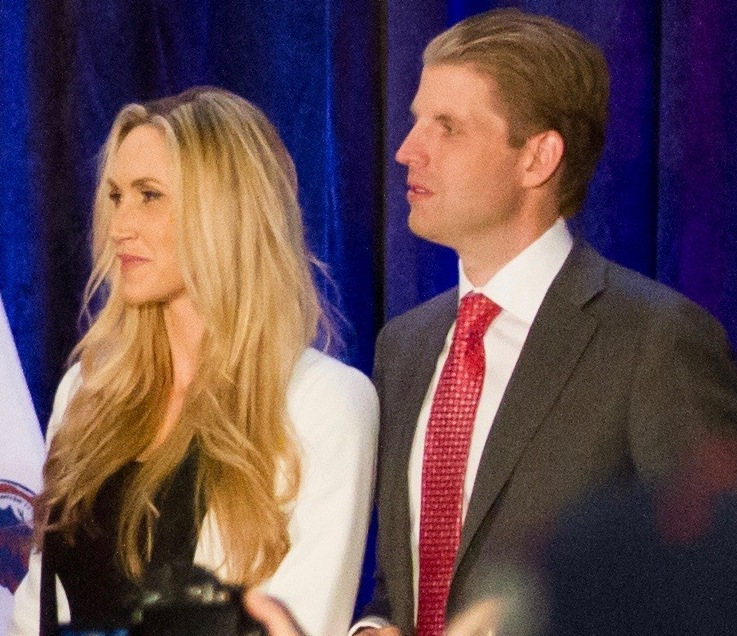
Lara with husband Eric Trump in 2016

=== Donald Trump presidential campaigns ===
During Donald Trump's 2016 presidential campaign, she spearheaded the Trump-Pence Women's Empowerment Tour and was the Trump Tower liaison for Brad Parscale's Giles-Parscale company. After her father-in-law was elected president, she became an online producer and fundraiser for him.

In April 2019, she described German chancellor Angela Merkel's decision to accept refugees during the European migrant crisis of 2015 as "the downfall of Germany; it was one of the worst things that ever happened to Germany."

She was a senior consultant to Parscale for Trump's reelection campaign in 2020. The campaign paid her $180,000 a year through Parscale's private company, Parscale Strategy. Lara Trump was a surrogate on the stump and took on broad advisory roles. She also campaigned with far-right activist and conspiracy theorist Laura Loomer.

She was among the speakers at the "Save America" rally that preceded the January 6 United States Capitol attack alongside Eric Trump and Donald Trump Jr.

During Donald Trump's 2024 campaign, Lara Trump spoke at a fundraiser in North Carolina for the Log Cabin Republicans.

=== Potential Senate campaign ===
After Donald Trump left office in 2021, it was widely rumored that Lara Trump would run for the United States Senate seat being vacated by the retiring Richard Burr. However, after several months of media speculation, she declined to run and endorsed the eventual winner, U.S. Representative Ted Budd.

In July 2025, she announced that she would not run for the Senate seat being vacated by Thom Tillis.

=== Music career ===
In 2023, Trump released a cover of Tom Petty's song "I Won't Back Down". It debuted at No. 10 on Billboard's Digital Song Sales chart and #6 on Billboard's Country Digital Song Sales Chart. Followed by numerous other songs.

=== Co-chair of the Republican National Committee ===
On February 12, 2024, Lara Trump was endorsed by her father-in-law for the Republican National Committee's co-chair, alongside North Carolina Republican Party leader Michael Whatley for chair. Within a week, she declared that if she were to become co-chair, then "every single penny will go to the number one and the only job of the RNC — that is electing Donald J. Trump as President of the United States and saving this country."

On March 8, 2024, Lara Trump was elected co-chair of the RNC by a unanimous vote. She resigned from the post on December 9, 2024, amid speculation that she would be appointed to fill the remainder with Marco Rubio's unfinished term in the Senate. However, she withdrew her name from contention on December 21.

=== Fox News ===
In February 2025, Trump debuted her talk show My View with Lara Trump on Fox News, replacing One Nation with Brian Kilmeade in the time slot.

== Personal life ==
On November 8, 2014, after a six-year relationship, Lara Yunaska married Eric Trump in a ceremony at Mar-a-Lago, the Palm Beach, Florida estate of Eric's father, Donald Trump. On September 12, 2017, the couple's first child was born. On August 19, 2019, Lara gave birth to the couple's second child.
