= List of rallies for the 2016 Donald Trump presidential campaign =

This is a list of rallies held by Donald Trump for his first successful presidential campaign in the 2016 presidential election resulting in him being elected the 45th president of the United States during his first presidency from 2017 to 2021. During the campaign which lasted 512 days, a total of 323 rallies were held: 186 for the primary season and 137 for the general election with total people attendance of over 1.4 million (over 790,000 during primary elections and over 650,000 for the general elections).

His first ever rally was on June 16, 2015, the same day he announced he was running for President of the United States from Trump Tower in New York. His first rally was in Des Moines, Iowa.

== Primary season ==
Locations in the United States visited by Donald Trump during the primaries of his 2016 presidential campaign

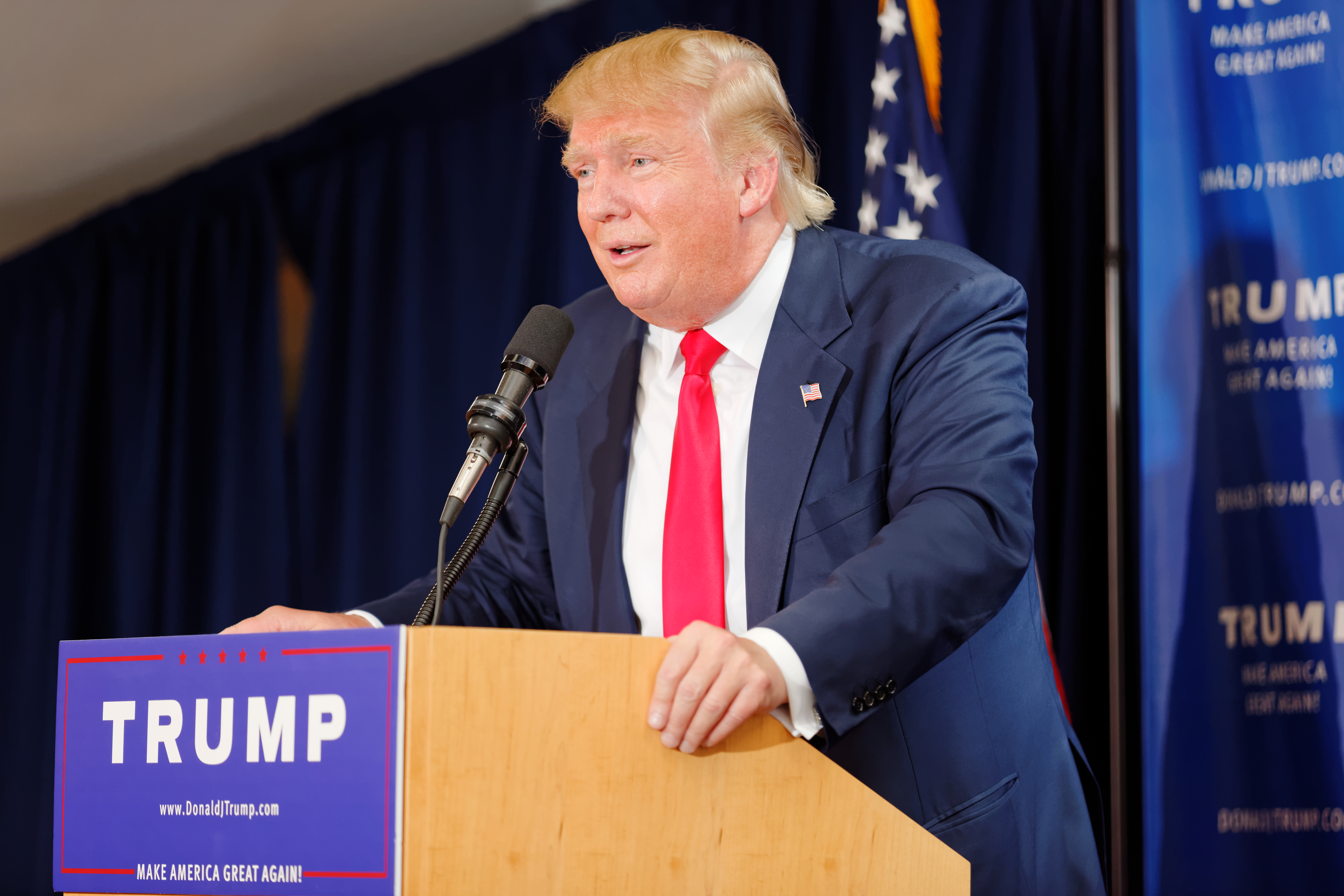
Laconia, New Hampshire, 07/16/2015

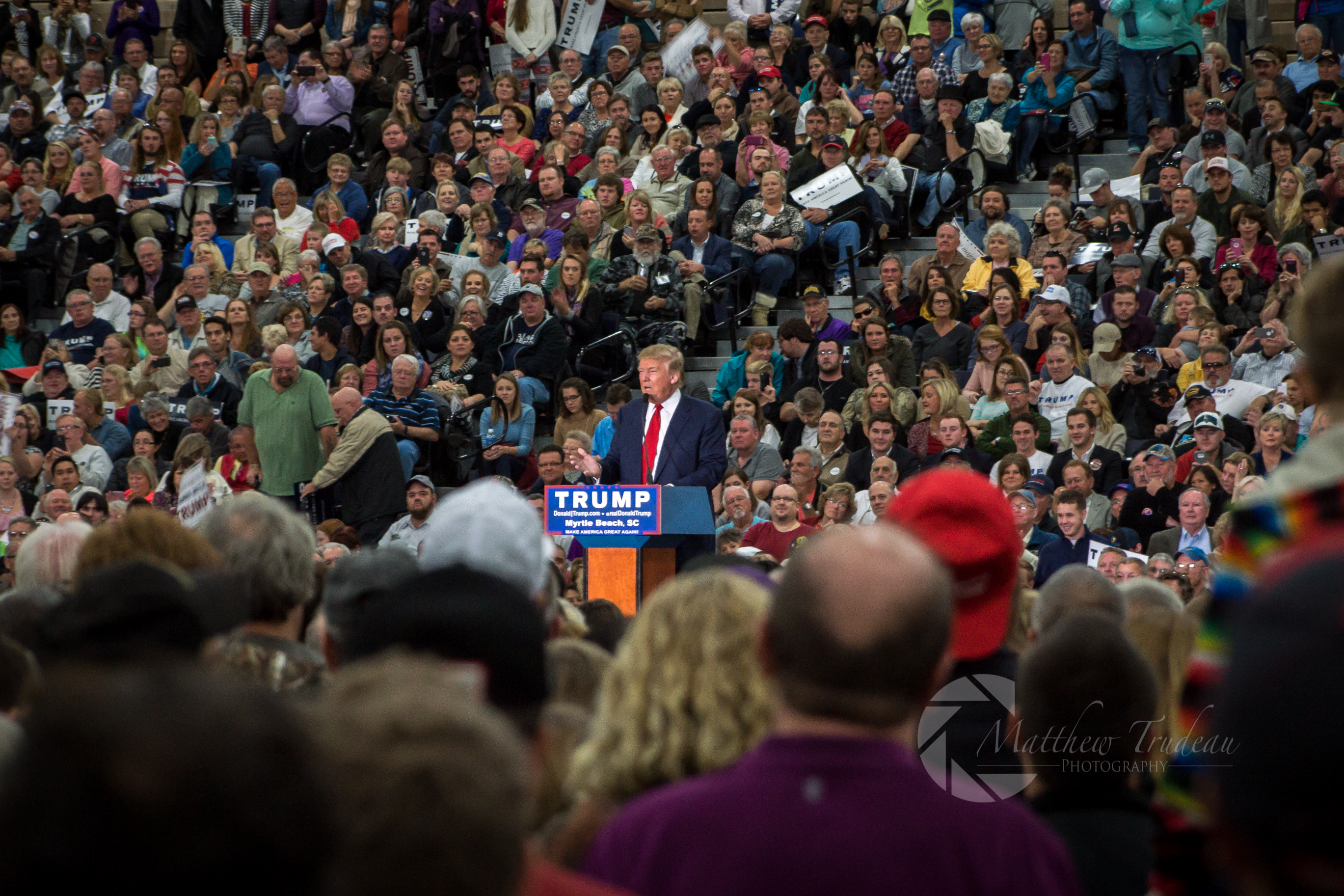
Myrtle Beach, South Carolina, 11/24/2015

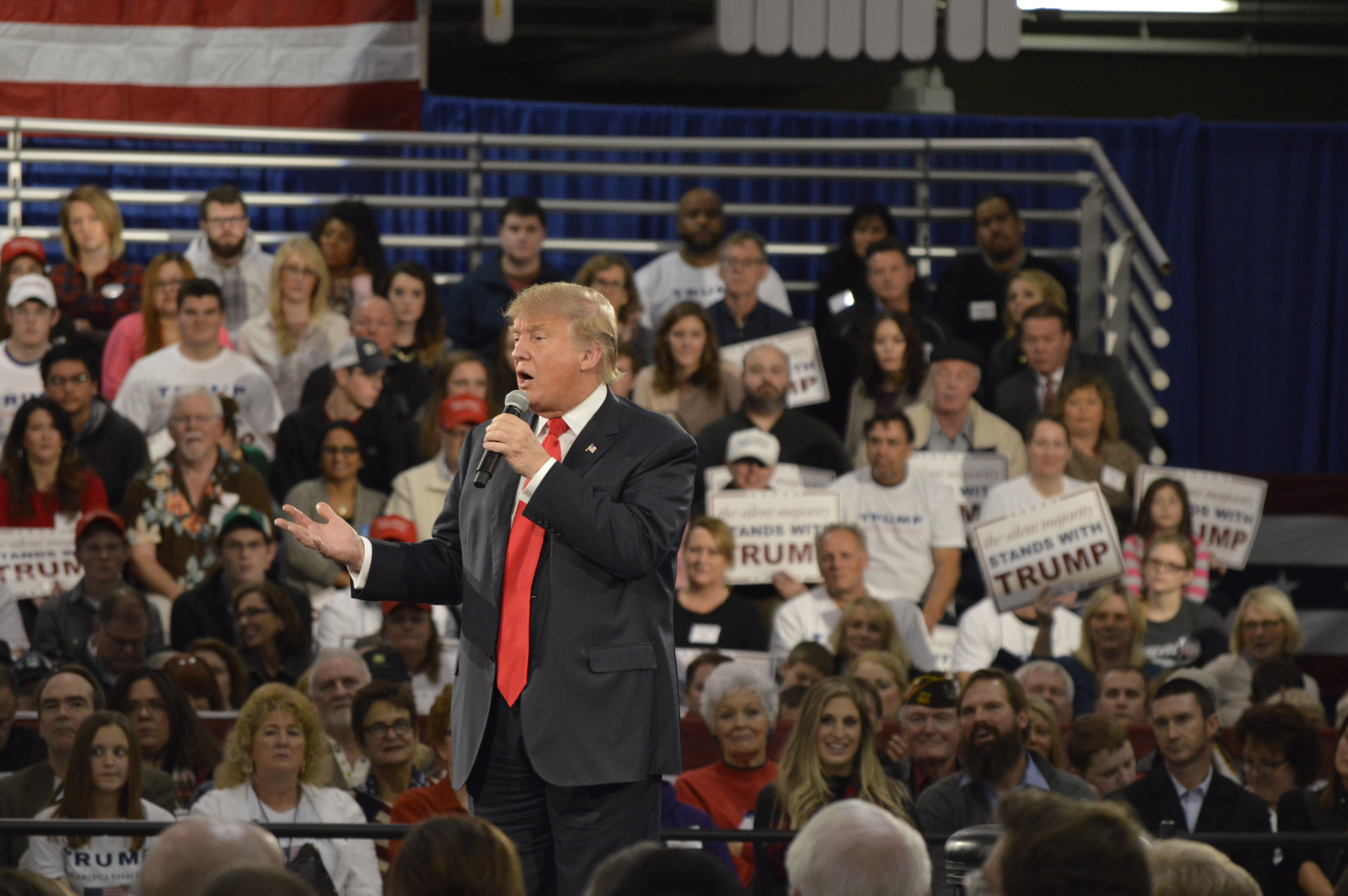
Des Moines, Iowa, 12/11/2015

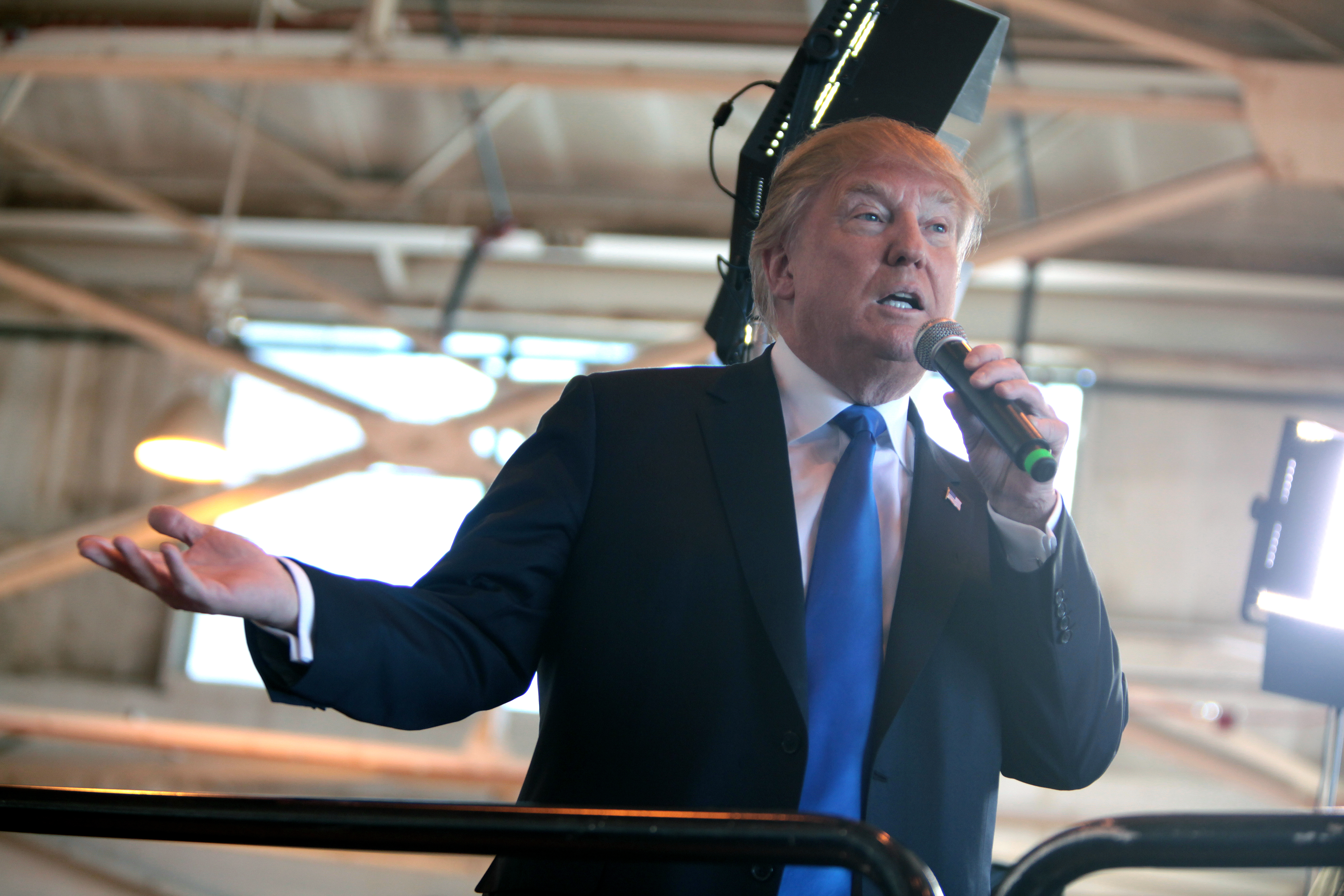
Mesa, Arizona, 12/16/2015

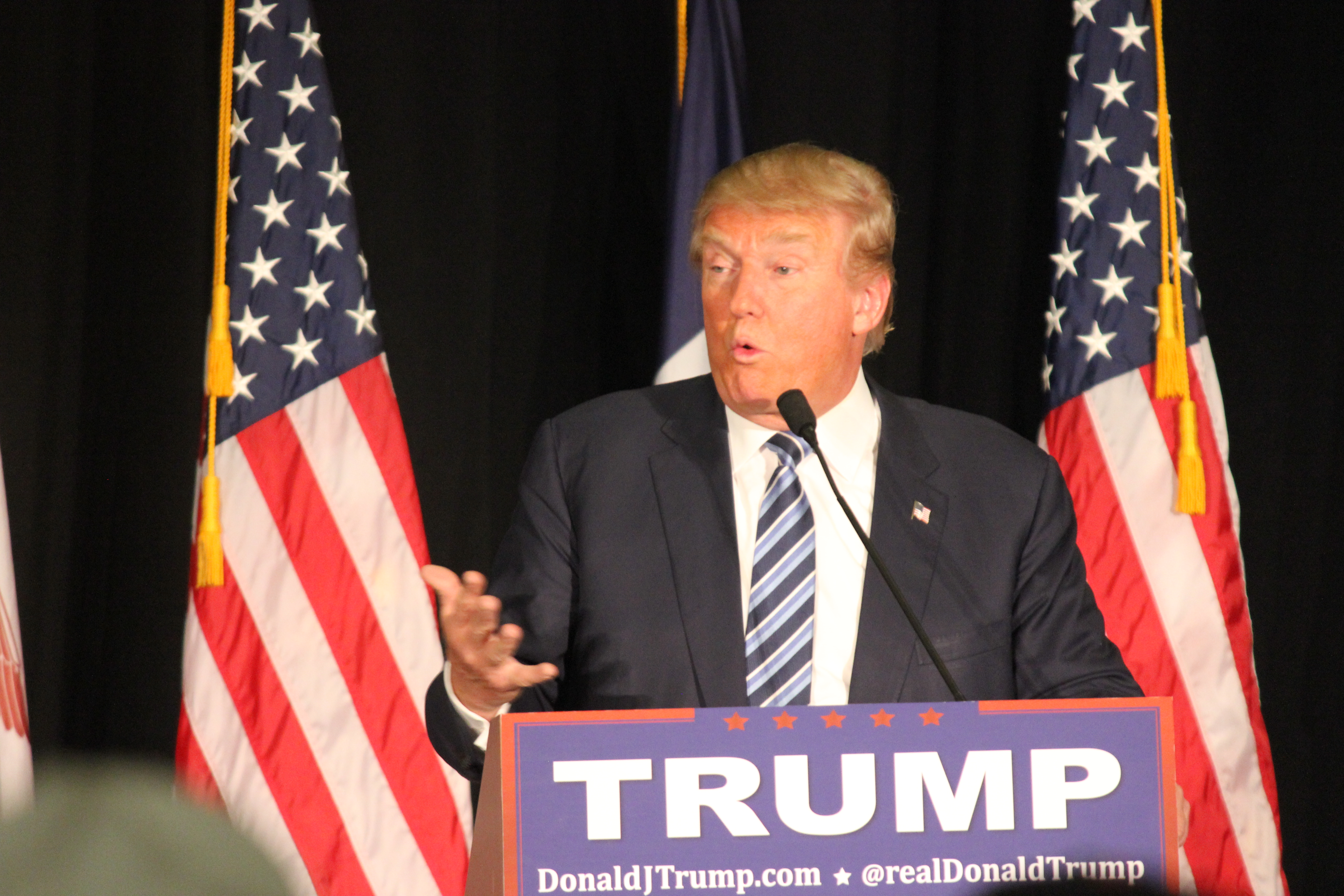
Council Bluffs, Iowa, 12/29/2015

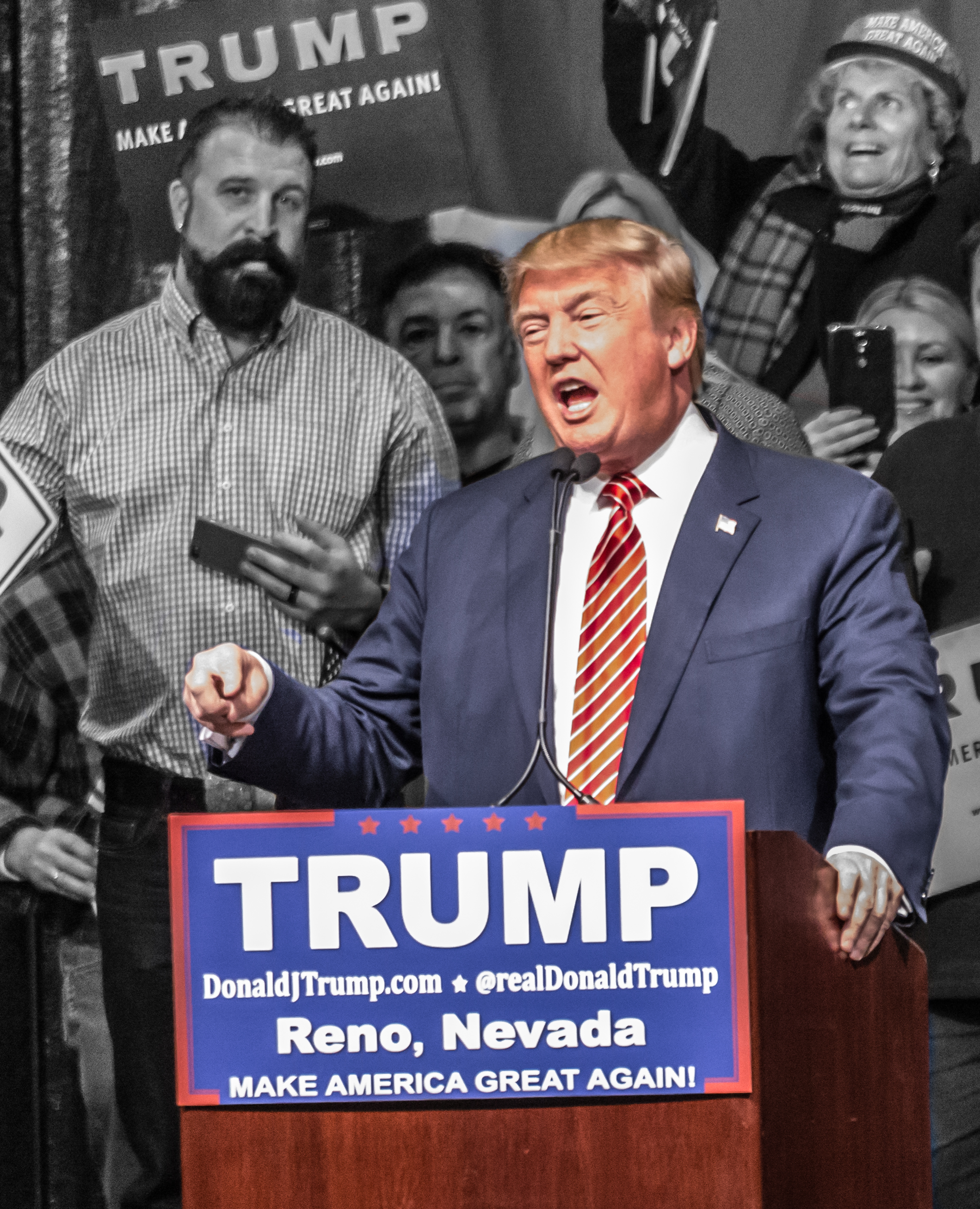
Reno, Nevada, 01/10/2016

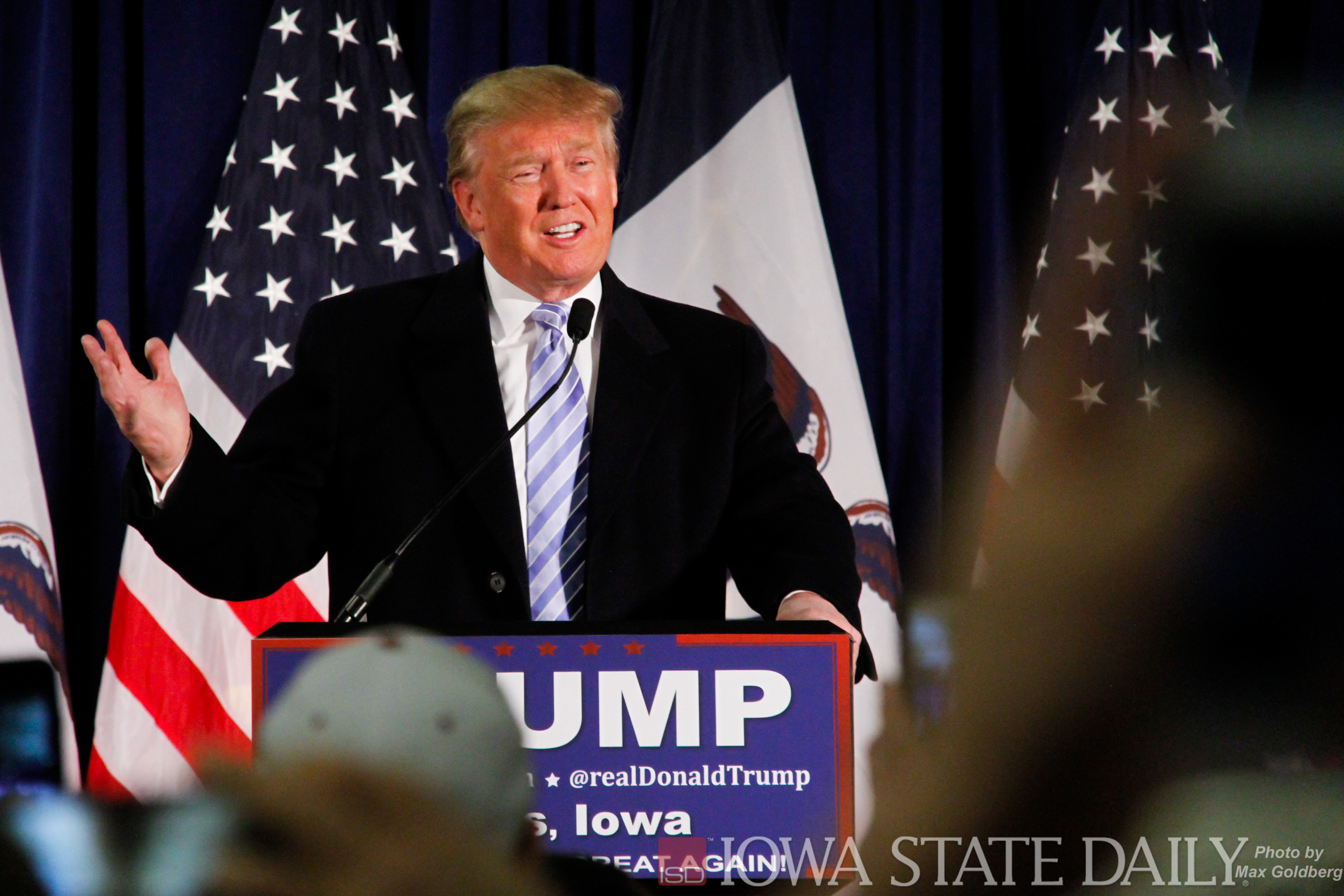
Ames, Iowa, 01/19/2016

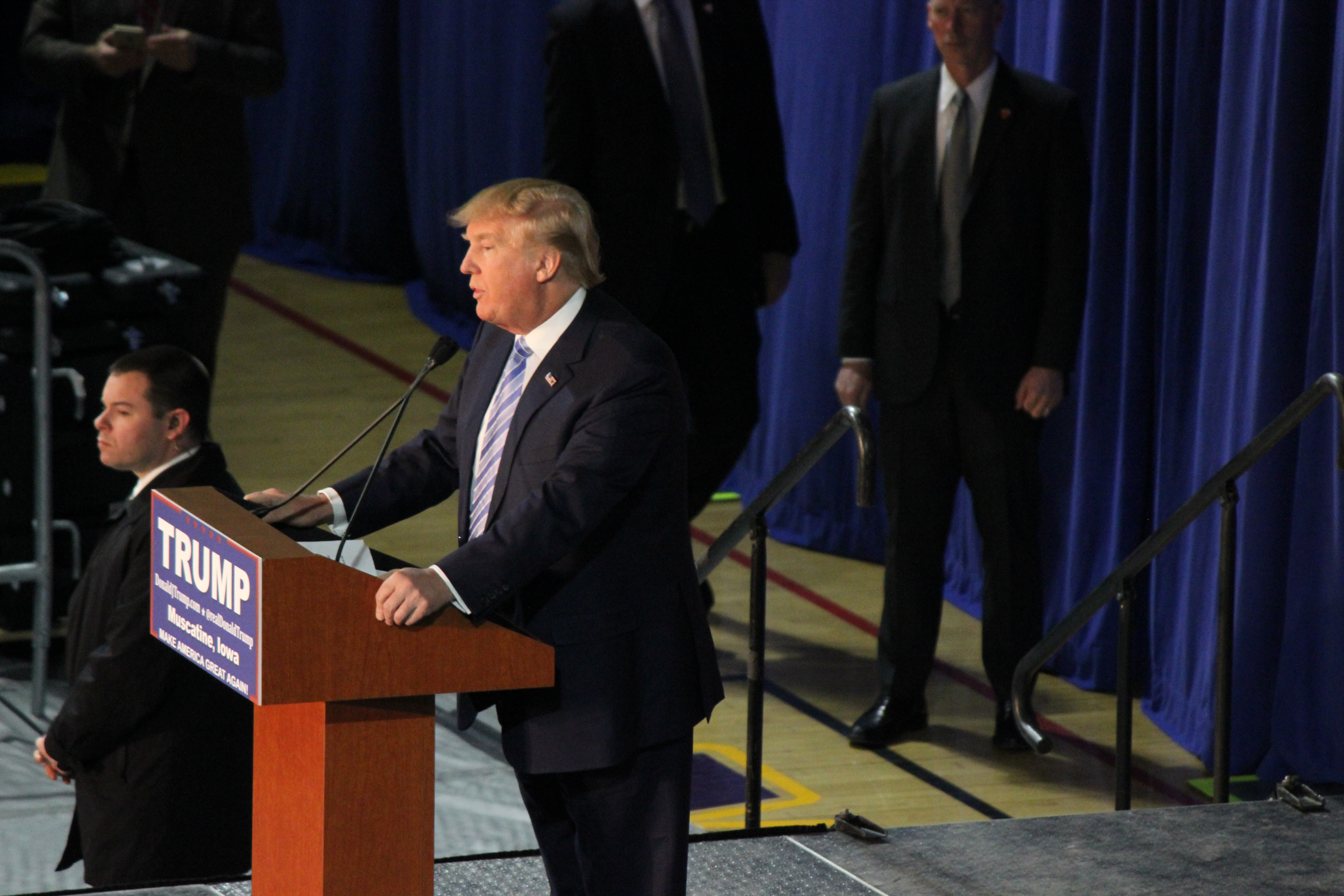
Muscatine, Iowa, 01/24/2016

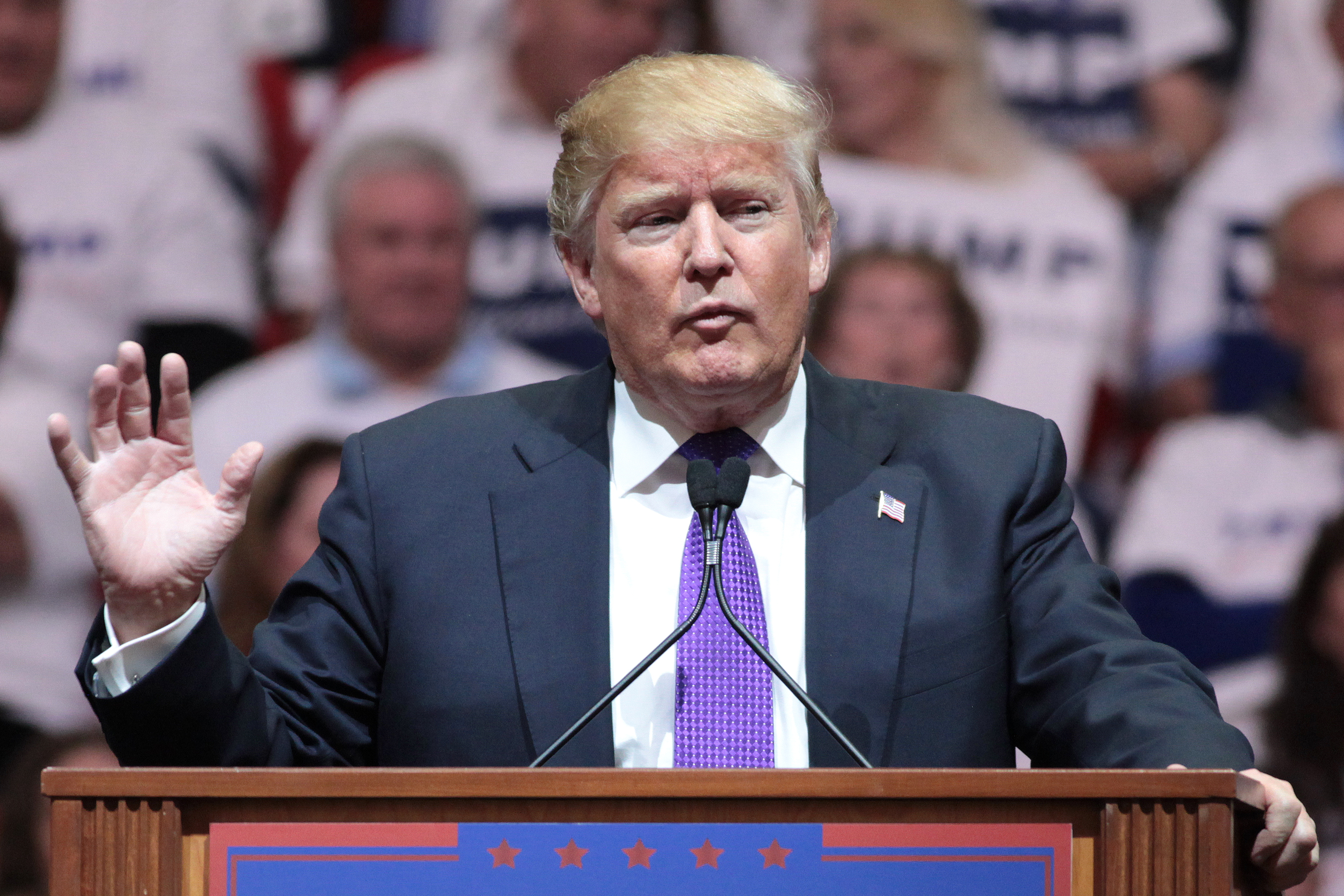
Las Vegas, Nevada, 02/22/2016

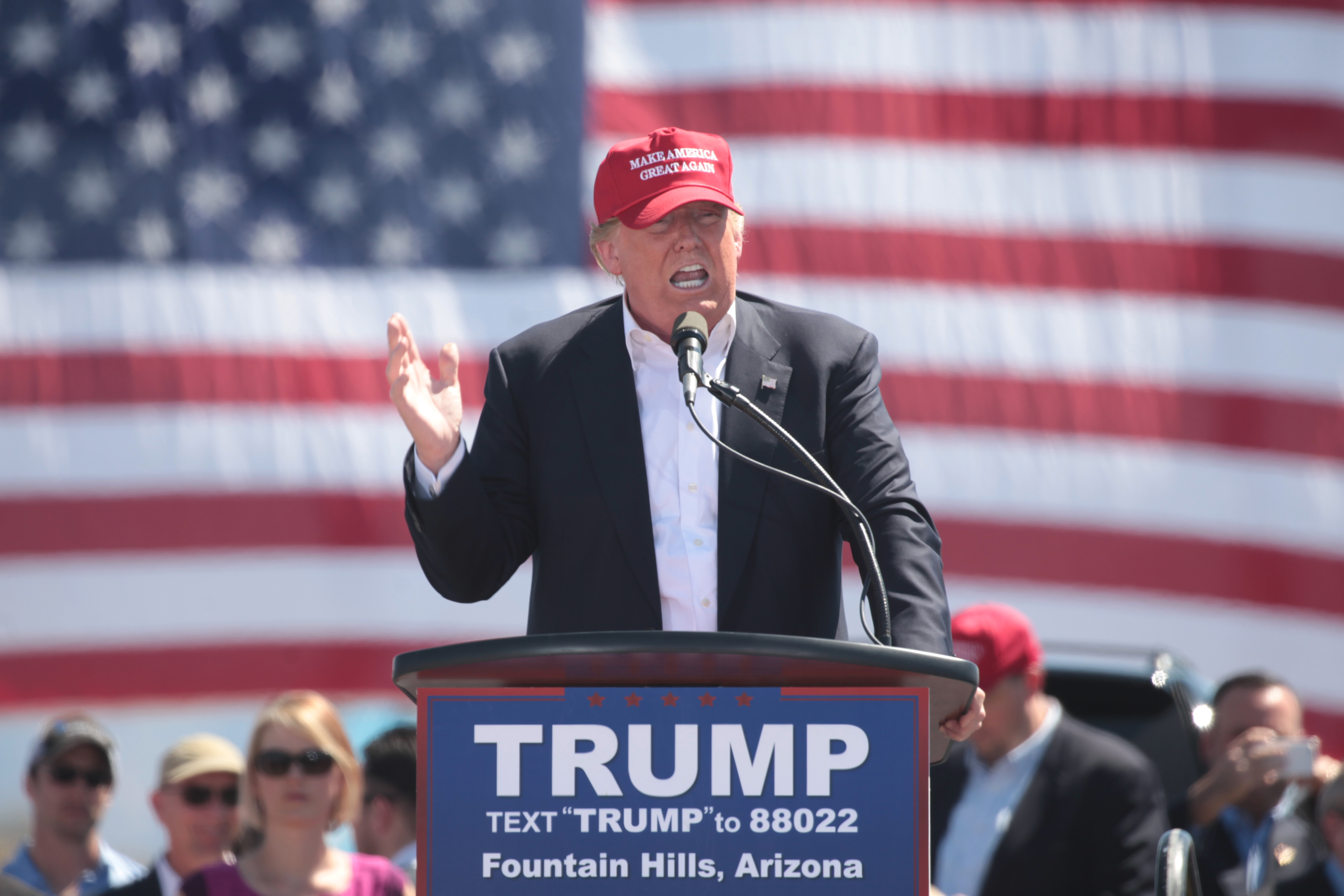
Fountain Hills, Arizona, 03/18/2016

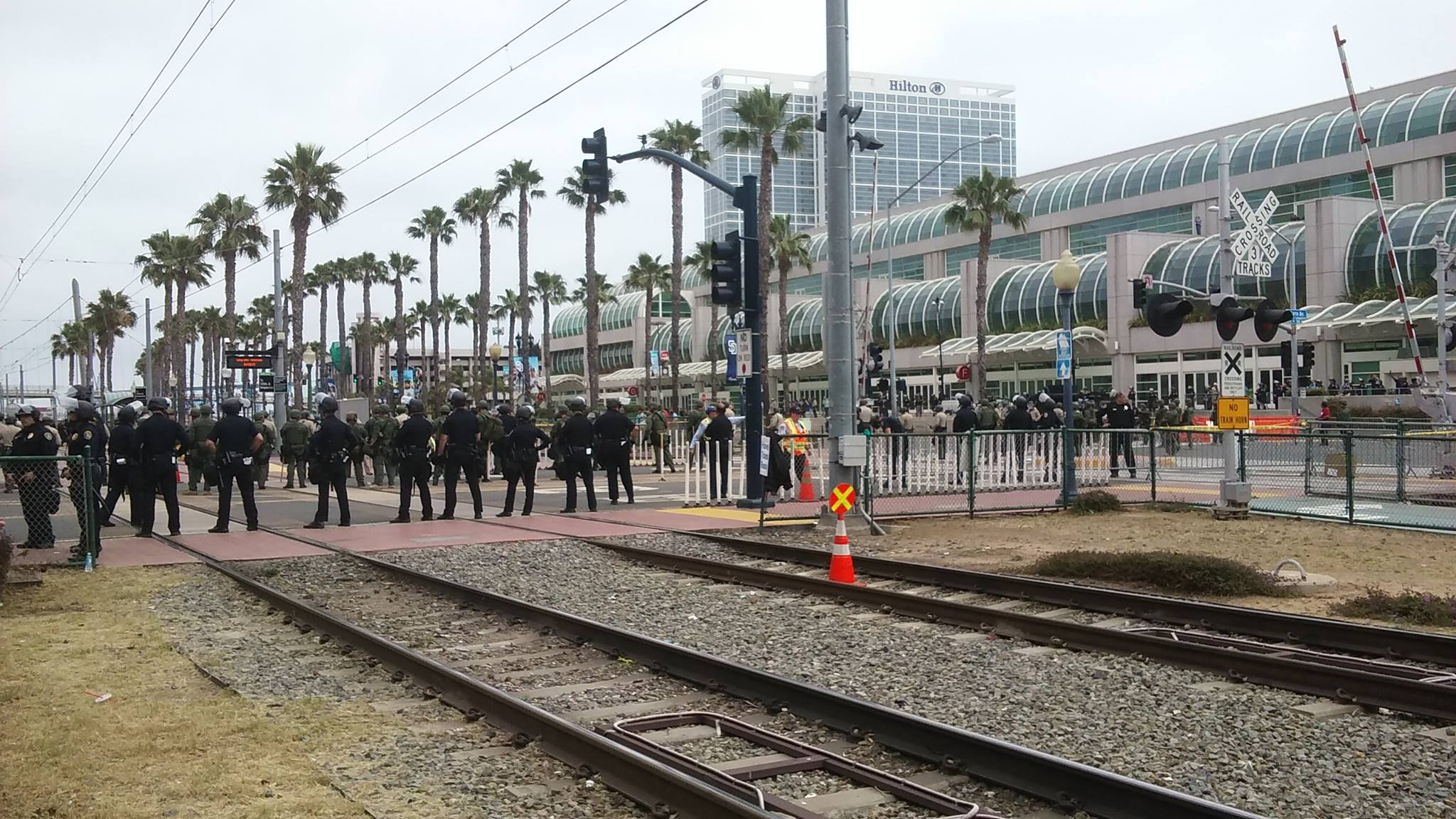
San Diego, California, 5/27/2016

Primary rallies (June 2015–June 2016)
Date of Rally	City	State	Venue	Estimated Visitors	Source
Tuesday, June 16, 2015	Des Moines	IA	Hoyt Sherman Place	1300	
Wednesday, June 17, 2015	Manchester	NH	Manchester Community College	300	
Saturday, July 11, 2015	Phoenix	AZ	Phoenix Convention Center	4,170	
Tuesday, July 21, 2015	Sun City	SC	Magnolia Hall	500	
Saturday, July 25, 2015	Oskaloosa	IA	Oskaloosa High School	1,000	
Friday, August 14, 2015	Hampton	NH	Winnacunnet High School	3,000	
Friday, August 21, 2015	Mobile	AL	Ladd–Peebles Stadium	15,000–30,000	
Tuesday, August 25, 2015	Dubuque	IA	Grand River Center	3,000	
Thursday, August 27, 2015	Greenville	SC	TD Convention Center	1,400	
Friday, August 28, 2015	Norwood	MA	Home of Ernie Boch, Jr.	1,500–2,000	
Monday, September 14, 2015	Dallas	TX	American Airlines Center	15,000	
Tuesday, September 15, 2015	Los Angeles	CA	USS Iowa	1,000	
Friday, September 25, 2015	Oklahoma City	OK	Oklahoma State Fair	15,000	
Wednesday, September 30, 2015	Keene	NH	Keene High School	3,500	
Saturday, October 3, 2015	Franklin	TN	Dortch Stove Works		
Wednesday, October 7, 2015	Waterloo	IA	Electric Park Ballroom	1,100	
Saturday, October 10, 2015	Norcross	GA	North Atlanta Trade Center	7,700	
Friday, October 16, 2015	Tyngsboro	MA	Tyngsboro Elementary School	1,000	
Monday, October 19, 2015	Anderson	SC	Civic Center of Anderson	5,000	
Friday, October 23, 2015	Miami	FL	Trump National Doral Miami		
Saturday, October 24, 2015	Jacksonville	FL	Jacksonville Landing	20,000	
Tuesday, October 27, 2015	Sioux City	IA	West High School	2,200	
Thursday, October 29, 2015	Sparks	NV	Nugget Casino Resort	2,000	
Saturday, October 31, 2015	Norfolk	VA	USS Wisconsin	2,000	
Monday, November 9, 2015	Springfield	IL	Prairie Capital Convention Center	10,200	
Thursday, November 12, 2015	Fort Dodge	IA	Iowa Central Community College	1,500	
Saturday, November 14, 2015	Beaumont	TX	Ford Arena		
Monday, November 16, 2015	Knoxville	TN	Knoxville Convention Center	5,000	
Wednesday, November 18, 2015	Worcester	MA	DCU Center	10,500	
Thursday, November 19, 2015	Newton	IA	Maytag Auditorium, DMACC Newton Campus	400	
Saturday, November 21, 2015	Birmingham	AL	Birmingham–Jefferson Convention Complex	3,000	
Monday, November 23, 2015	Columbus	OH	Greater Columbus Convention Center	14,000	
Tuesday, November 24, 2015	Myrtle Beach	SC	Myrtle Beach Convention Center	8,000	
Saturday, November 28, 2015	Sarasota	FL	Robarts Arena	9,000	
Monday, November 30, 2015	Macon	GA	Macon Coliseum	6,000	
Tuesday, December 1, 2015	Waterville Valley	NH	White Mountain Athletic Club	900	
Wednesday, December 2, 2015	Manassas	VA	Prince William County Fairgrounds		
Friday, December 4, 2015	Raleigh	NC	Dorton Arena	8,000	
Saturday, December 5, 2015	Davenport	IA	Mississippi Valley Fairgrounds	1,700	
Saturday, December 5, 2015	Spencer	IA	Clay County Regional Events Center	1,300	
Monday, December 7, 2015	Mount Pleasant	SC	USS Yorktown		
Friday, December 11, 2015	Des Moines	IA	Varied Industries Building, Iowa State Fairgrounds	2,500	
Saturday, December 12, 2015	Aiken	SC	USC Aiken Convocation Center		
Monday, December 14, 2015	Las Vegas	NV	Westgate Las Vegas Resort & Casino		
Wednesday, December 16, 2015	Mesa	AZ	Phoenix–Mesa Gateway Airport	3,100	
Saturday, December 19, 2015	Cedar Rapids	IA	Veterans Memorial Coliseum	1,200	
Monday, December 21, 2015	Grand Rapids	MI	DeltaPlex Arena	7,000	
Monday, December 28, 2015	Nashua	NH	Pennichuck Middle School	1,000	
Tuesday, December 29, 2015	Council Bluffs	IA	Mid-America Center		
Wednesday, December 30, 2015	Hilton Head	SC	The Westin Hilton Head Island Resort & Spa	2,500	
Saturday, January 2, 2016	Biloxi	MS	Mississippi Coast Coliseum	15,000	
Monday, January 4, 2016	Lowell	MA	Tsongas Center		
Tuesday, January 5, 2016	Claremont	NH	Stevens High School	1,200	
Thursday, January 7, 2016	Burlington	VT	Flynn Center for the Performing Arts	1,400	
Friday, January 8, 2016	Rock Hill	SC	Winthrop Coliseum	6,500	
Saturday, January 9, 2016	Clear Lake	IA	Surf Ballroom	1,700	
Saturday, January 9, 2016	Ottumwa	IA	Bridgeview Center		
Sunday, January 10, 2016	Reno	NV	Reno Events Center	4,000	
Monday, January 11, 2016	Windham	NH	Castleton Banquet and Conference Center	600	
Tuesday, January 12, 2016	Cedar Falls	IA	West Gymnasium, University of Northern Iowa	2,000	
Wednesday, January 13, 2016	Pensacola	FL	Pensacola Bay Center	10,000	
Friday, January 15, 2016	Urbandale	IA	Living History Farms Visitor Center	100	
Monday, January 18, 2016	Concord	NH	Concord High School	700	
Monday, January 18, 2016	Lynchburg	VA	Vines Center, Liberty University	10,000	
Tuesday, January 19, 2016	Ames	IA	Hansen Agriculture Student Learning Center, Iowa State University	2,000	
Wednesday, January 20, 2016	Norwalk	IA	The Wright Place	300	
Wednesday, January 20, 2016	Tulsa	OK	Mabee Center, Oral Roberts University	9,000	
Thursday, January 21, 2016	Las Vegas	NV	South Point Hotel, Casino & Spa	3,000	
Saturday, January 23, 2016	Pella	IA	Douwstra Auditorium, Central College	400	
Saturday, January 23, 2016	Sioux Center	IA	B. J. Haan Auditorium, Dordt College	2,600	
Sunday, January 24, 2016	Muscatine	IA	Muscatine High School	1,000	
Monday, January 25, 2016	Farmington	NH	Farmington Senior High School	1,000	
Tuesday, January 26, 2016	Iowa City	IA	Iowa Field House, University of Iowa	2,000	
Tuesday, January 26, 2016	Marshalltown	IA	Roundhouse Gymnasium, Marshalltown High School	2,100	
Wednesday, January 27, 2016	Gilbert	SC	The Barn at Harmon's	400	
Thursday, January 28, 2016	Des Moines	IA	Sheslow Auditorium, Drake University	700	
Friday, January 29, 2016	Nashua	NH	Radisson Hotel Nashua	850	
Saturday, January 30, 2016	Clinton	IA	Clinton Middle School	1,000	
Saturday, January 30, 2016	Davenport	IA	Adler Theatre	2,400	
Saturday, January 30, 2016	Dubuque	IA	Dubuque Regional Airport	1,200	
Sunday, January 31, 2016	Council Bluffs	IA	Gerald W. Kirn Middle School	2,000	
Monday, February 1, 2016	Cedar Rapids	IA	DoubleTree Hotel Cedar Rapids Convention Complex	1,500	
Monday, February 1, 2016	Waterloo	IA	Ramada Waterloo Hotel and Convention Center	300	
Tuesday, February 2, 2016	Milford	NH	Hampshire Hills Athletic Club		
Wednesday, February 3, 2016	Little Rock	AR	Barton Coliseum	11,500	
Thursday, February 4, 2016	Exeter	NH	Exeter Town Hall		
Thursday, February 4, 2016	Portsmouth	NH	Great Bay Community College	500	
Friday, February 5, 2016	Florence	SC	Florence Civic Center		
Sunday, February 7, 2016	Holderness	NH	ALLWell North, Plymouth State University	2,500	
Monday, February 8, 2016	Londonderry	NH	Londonderry Lions Club	200	
Monday, February 8, 2016	Manchester	NH	Verizon Wireless Arena	5,000	
Monday, February 8, 2016	Salem	NH	Derry-Salem Elks Lodge	200	
Wednesday, February 10, 2016	Pendleton	SC	T. Ed Garrison Arena, Clemson University	5,000	
Thursday, February 11, 2016	Baton Rouge	LA	Baton Rouge River Center	10,000	
Friday, February 12, 2016	Tampa	FL	USF Sun Dome, University of South Florida	10,000	
Monday, February 15, 2016	Greenville	SC	TD Convention Center		
Tuesday, February 16, 2016	Beaufort	SC	Beaufort High School Performing Arts Center	20,000	
Tuesday, February 16, 2016	North Augusta	SC	Riverview Park Activities Center	2,000	
Wednesday, February 17, 2016	Sumter	SC	Sumter County Civic Center	4,000	
Wednesday, February 17, 2016	Walterboro	SC	Randy and Sara White's farm	4,000	
Thursday, February 18, 2016	Gaffney	SC	Broad River Electric Cooperative		
Thursday, February 18, 2016	Kiawah	SC	Turtle Point Clubhouse, Kiawah Island Golf Resort		
Friday, February 19, 2016	North Charleston	SC	North Charleston Convention Center	2,000	
Friday, February 19, 2016	Myrtle Beach	SC	Myrtle Beach Sports Center	12,000	
Friday, February 19, 2016	Pawleys Island	SC	Pawley's Plantation Golf & Country Club	1,000	
Sunday, February 21, 2016	Atlanta	GA	Georgia World Congress Center		
Monday, February 22, 2016	Las Vegas	NV	South Point Hotel, Casino & Spa		
Tuesday, February 23, 2016	Sparks	NV	Rose Ballroom	3,000	
Friday, February 26, 2016	Fort Worth	TX	Fort Worth Convention Center	8,000	
Friday, February 26, 2016	Oklahoma City	OK	Cox Convention Center	7,000	
Saturday, February 27, 2016	Highfill	AR	Northwest Arkansas Regional Airport	5,000	
Saturday, February 27, 2016	Millington	TN	Millington Regional Jetport	10,000	
Sunday, February 28, 2016	Madison	AL	Madison City Schools Stadium		
Monday, February 29, 2016	Radford	VA	Dedmon Center, Radford University	3,800	
Monday, February 29, 2016	Valdosta	GA	The Complex, Valdosta State University	7,500	
Tuesday, March 1, 2016	Columbus	OH	Port Columbus International Airport	4,000	
Tuesday, March 1, 2016	Louisville	KY	Kentucky International Convention Center	5,000	
Thursday, March 3, 2016	Portland	ME	The Westin Portland Harborview Hotel	1,100	
Friday, March 4, 2016	Warren	MI	Sports & Expo Center, Macomb Community College	4,000	
Friday, March 4, 2016	Cadillac	MI	Wexford County Civic Center	3,500	
Friday, March 4, 2016	New Orleans	LA	Lakefront Airport	4,000	
Saturday, March 5, 2016	Orlando	FL	CFE Arena, University of Central Florida	10,000	
Saturday, March 5, 2016	Wichita	KS	Century II Performing Arts & Convention Center		
Monday, March 7, 2016	Concord	NC	Cabarrus Arena & Events Center	3,000	
Monday, March 7, 2016	Madison	MS	Madison Central High School	9,000	
Wednesday, March 9, 2016	Fayetteville	NC	Crown Coliseum	11,000	
Friday, March 11, 2016	St. Louis	MO	Peabody Opera House	3,100	
Saturday, March 12, 2016	Cleveland	OH	I-X Center	29,000	
Saturday, March 12, 2016	Dayton	OH	Dayton International Airport	20,000	
Saturday, March 12, 2016	Kansas City	MO	Midland Theatre	7,000	
Sunday, March 13, 2016	Bloomington	IL	Synergy Flight Center, Central Illinois Regional Airport	3,000	
Sunday, March 13, 2016	Boca Raton	FL	Sunset Cove Amphitheater, Sugar Sand Park	6,000	
Monday, March 14, 2016	Tampa	FL	Tampa Convention Center	1,500	
Monday, March 14, 2016	Vienna	OH	Winner Aviation, Youngstown–Warren Regional Airport	2,500	
Friday, March 18, 2016	Salt Lake City	UT	Infinity Event Center	1,200	
Saturday, March 19, 2016	Fountain Hills	AZ	Fountain Park	10,000	
Saturday, March 19, 2016	Tucson	AZ	Tucson Convention Center	5,000	
Tuesday, March 29, 2016	Janesville	WI	Janesville Conference Center	1,000	
Wednesday, March 30, 2016	Appleton	WI	Radisson Paper Valley Hotel	1,000	
Wednesday, March 30, 2016	De Pere	WI	Byron L. Walter Theatre, St. Norbert College	750	
Saturday, April 2, 2016	Eau Claire	WI	Memorial High School	1,500	
Saturday, April 2, 2016	Racine	WI	Memorial Hall	1,200	
Saturday, April 2, 2016	Rothschild	WI	Central Wisconsin Convention & Expo Center	1,700	
Sunday, April 3, 2016	West Allis	WI	Nathan Hale High School	1,000	
Monday, April 4, 2016	La Crosse	WI	La Crosse Center	1,700	
Monday, April 4, 2016	Milwaukee	WI	Milwaukee Theatre		
Monday, April 4, 2016	Superior	WI	Richard I. Bong Airport	1,000	
Wednesday, April 6, 2016	Bethpage	NY	Grumman Studios	10,000	
Sunday, April 10, 2016	Rochester	NY	JetSmart Aviation Services, Greater Rochester International Airport	9,000	
Monday, April 11, 2016	Albany	NY	Times Union Center	10,000	
Tuesday, April 12, 2016	Rome	NY	Griffiss International Airport	5,000	
Wednesday, April 13, 2016	Pittsburgh	PA	David L. Lawrence Convention Center	4,500	
Friday, April 15, 2016	Hartford	CT	Connecticut Convention Center	7,000	
Friday, April 15, 2016	Plattsburgh	NY	Crete Civic Center	3,000	
Saturday, April 16, 2016	Syracuse	NY	Nicholas J. Pirro Convention Center, Oncenter	5,000	
Saturday, April 16, 2016	Watertown	NY	Watertown International Airport	2,000	
Sunday, April 17, 2016	Poughkeepsie	NY	Mid-Hudson Civic Center		
Monday, April 18, 2016	Buffalo	NY	First Niagara Center	11,400	
Wednesday, April 20, 2016	Indianapolis	IN	Elements Financial Blue Ribbon Pavilion, Indiana State Fairgrounds	4,000	
Wednesday, April 20, 2016	Berlin	MD	Stephen Decatur High School	3,000	
Thursday, April 21, 2016	Harrisburg	PA	Pennsylvania Farm Show Complex & Expo Center	6,000	
Friday, April 22, 2016	Harrington	DE	Quillen Arena, Delaware State Fairgrounds	8,200	
Saturday, April 23, 2016	Bridgeport	CT	Klein Memorial Auditorium	1,400	
Saturday, April 23, 2016	Waterbury	CT	Crosby High School	3,000	
Sunday, April 24, 2016	Hagerstown	MD	Rider Jet Center, Hagerstown Regional Airport	5,000	
Monday, April 25, 2016	Warwick	RI	Crowne Plaza Hotel Providence-Warwick	1,000	
Monday, April 25, 2016	West Chester	PA	West Chester University	3,500	
Monday, April 25, 2016	Wilkes-Barre	PA	Mohegan Sun Arena at Casey Plaza	10,000	
Wednesday, April 27, 2016	Indianapolis	IN	Indiana Farmers Coliseum	5,000	
Thursday, April 28, 2016	Costa Mesa	CA	Pacific Amphitheatre, OC Fair & Event Center		
Thursday, April 28, 2016	Evansville	IN	Old National Events Plaza	12,000	
Sunday, May 1, 2016	Fort Wayne	IN	Allen County War Memorial Coliseum	8,000	
Sunday, May 1, 2016	Terre Haute	IN	Indiana Theatre	2,100	
Monday, May 2, 2016	Carmel	IN	The Palladium at the Center for the Performing Arts	1,800	
Monday, May 2, 2016	South Bend	IN	Century Center	8,000	
Thursday, May 5, 2016	Charleston	WV	Charleston Civic Center		
Friday, May 6, 2016	Eugene	OR	Lane Events Center	5,000	
Friday, May 6, 2016	Omaha	NE	Werner Enterprises Hangar, Eppley Airfield	3,500	
Saturday, May 7, 2016	Lynden	WA	Northwest Washington Fair and Event Center	7,500	
Saturday, May 7, 2016	Spokane	WA	Spokane Convention Center	10,000	
Tuesday, May 24, 2016	Albuquerque	NM	Albuquerque Convention Center	8,000	
Wednesday, May 25, 2016	Anaheim	CA	Anaheim Convention Center	3,000	
Thursday, May 26, 2016	Billings	MT	Rimrock Auto Arena at MetraPark	7,000	
Friday, May 27, 2016	Fresno	CA	Selland Arena	7,000	
Friday, May 27, 2016	San Diego	CA	San Diego Convention Center		
Wednesday, June 1, 2016	Sacramento	CA	Sacramento Jet Center, Sacramento International Airport	5,000	
Thursday, June 2, 2016	San Jose	CA	South Hall, San Jose Convention Center		
Friday, June 3, 2016	Redding	CA	Redding Municipal Airport	4,000	

== General election season ==
Locations in the United States where President Donald Trump visited in 2016 presidential campaign (According to list below).

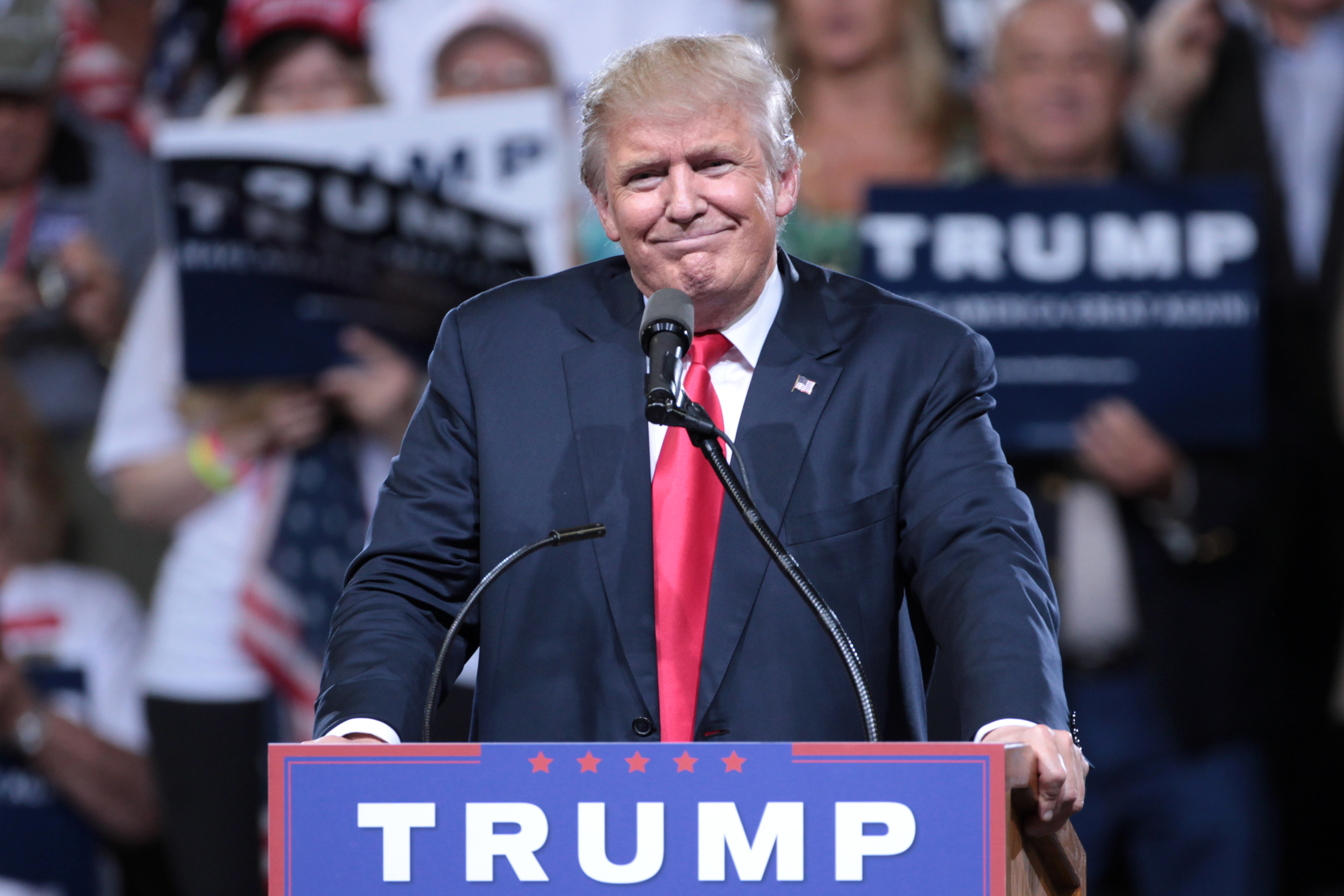
Phoenix, Arizona, 06/18/2016

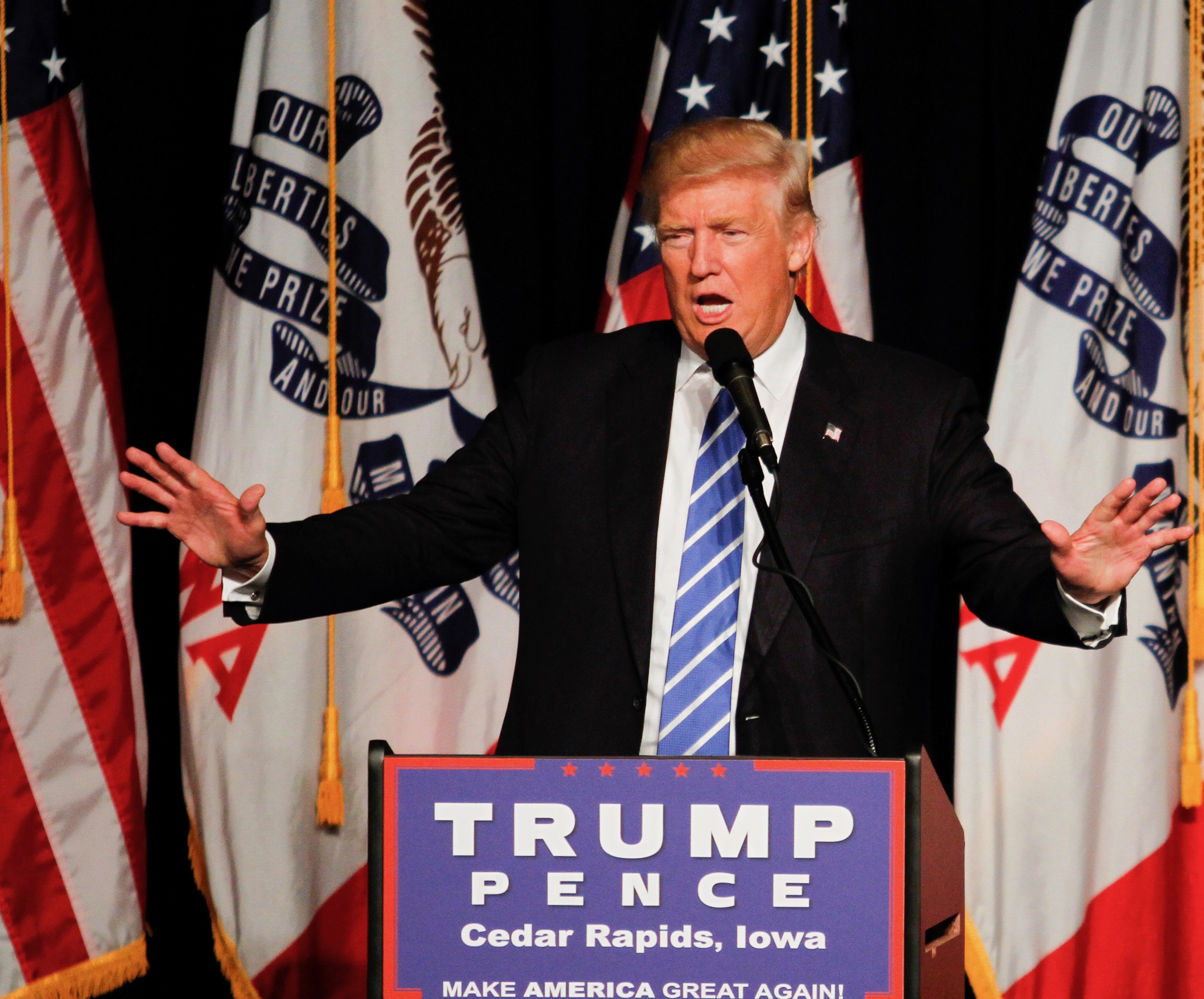
Cedar Rapids, Iowa, 07/28/2016

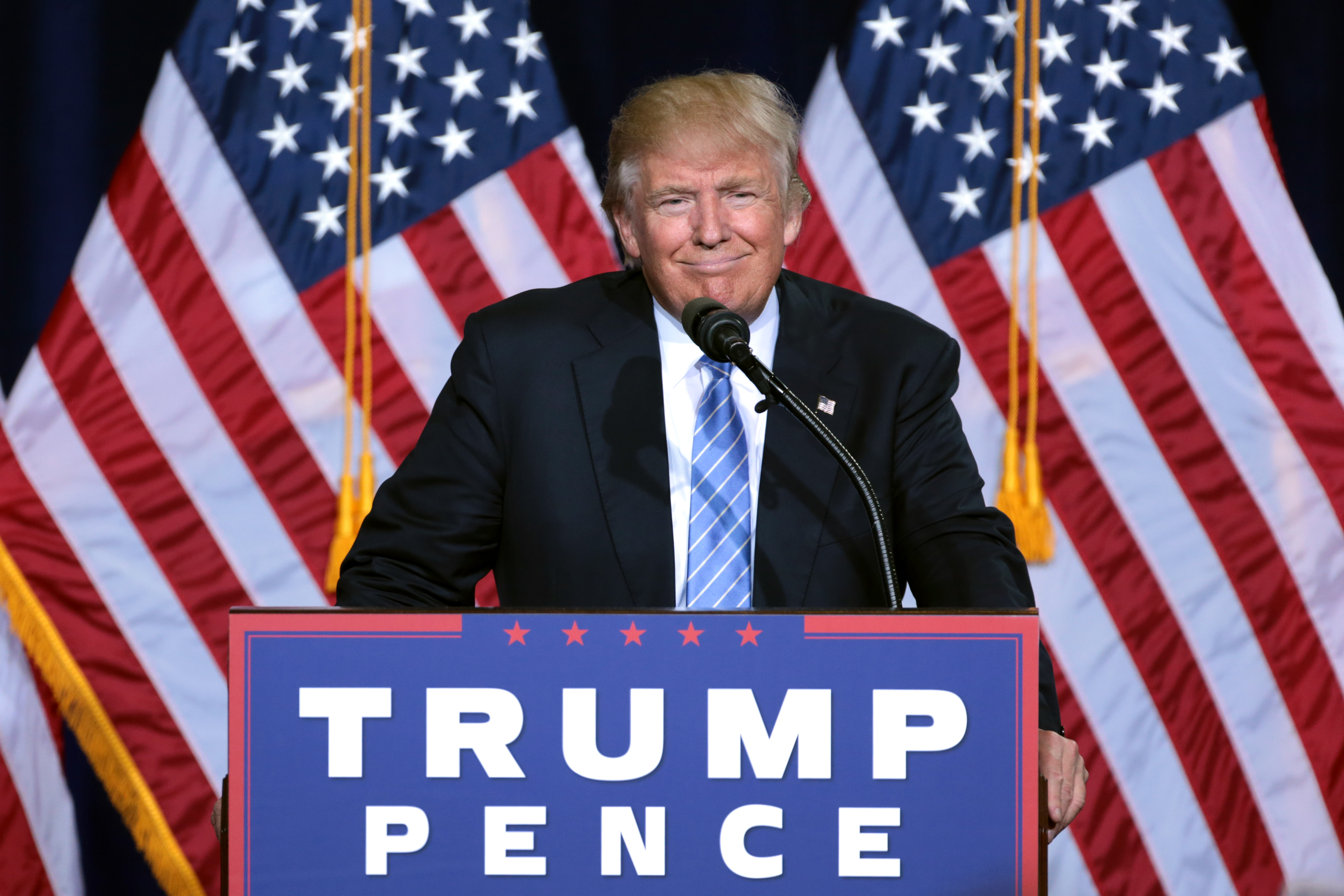
Phoenix, Arizona, 08/31/2016

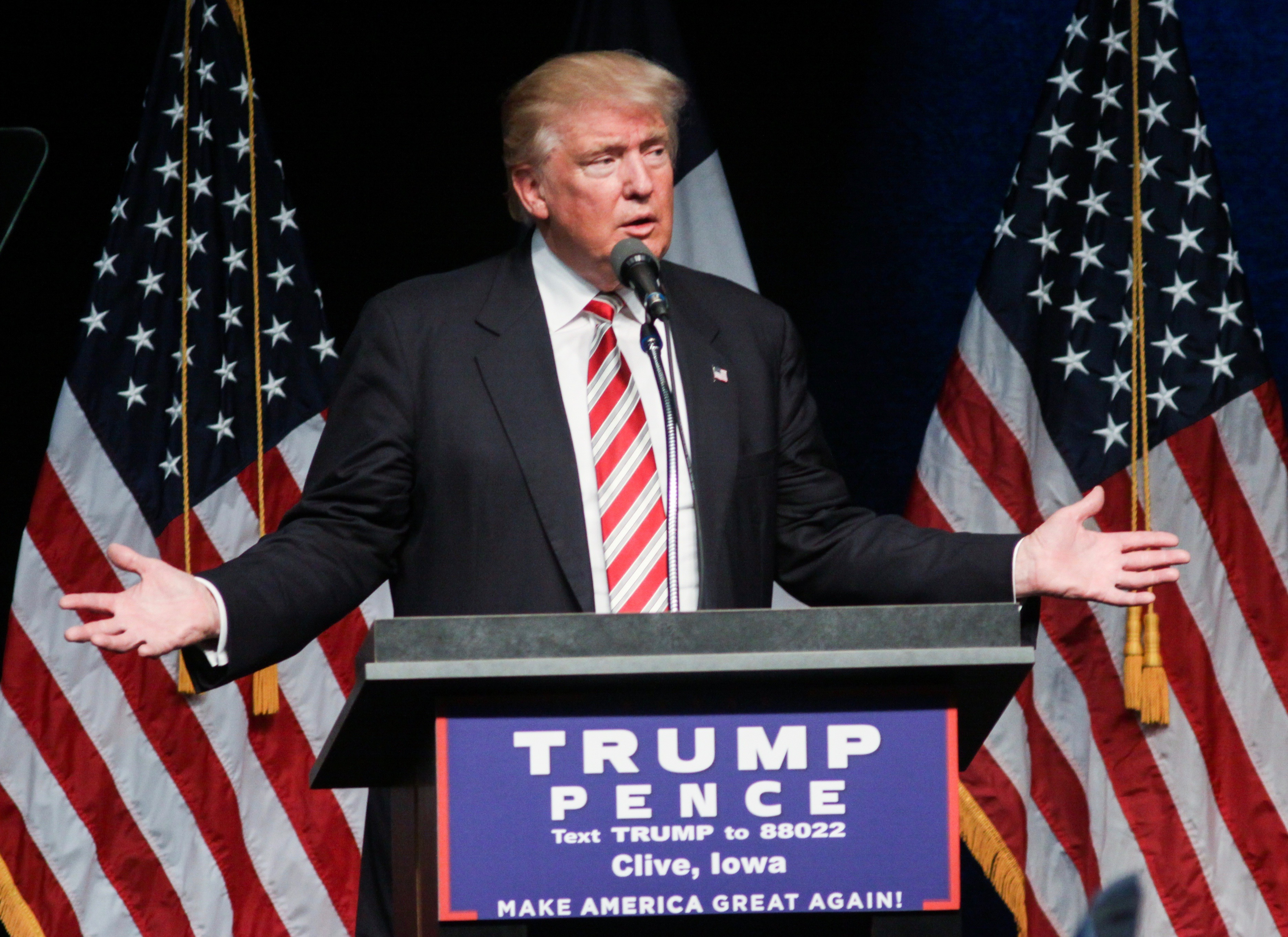
Clive, Iowa, 09/13/2016

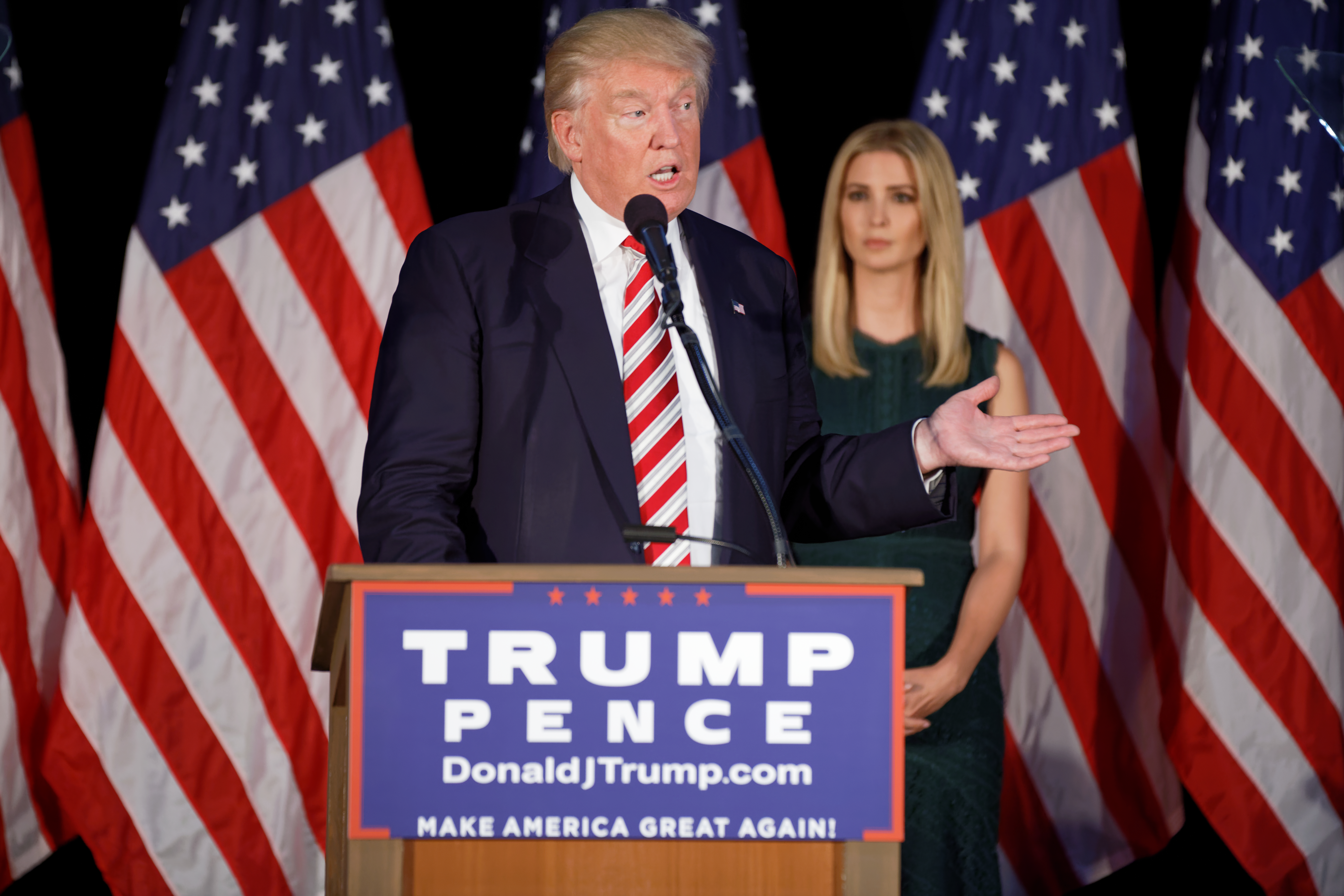
Aston, Pennsylvania, 09/13/2016

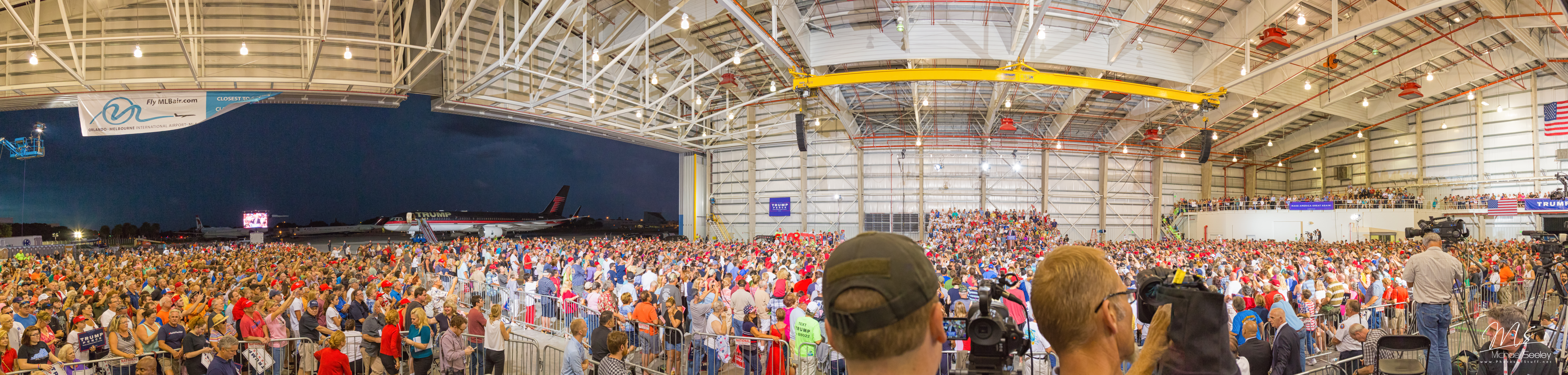
Melbourne, Florida, 09/27/2016

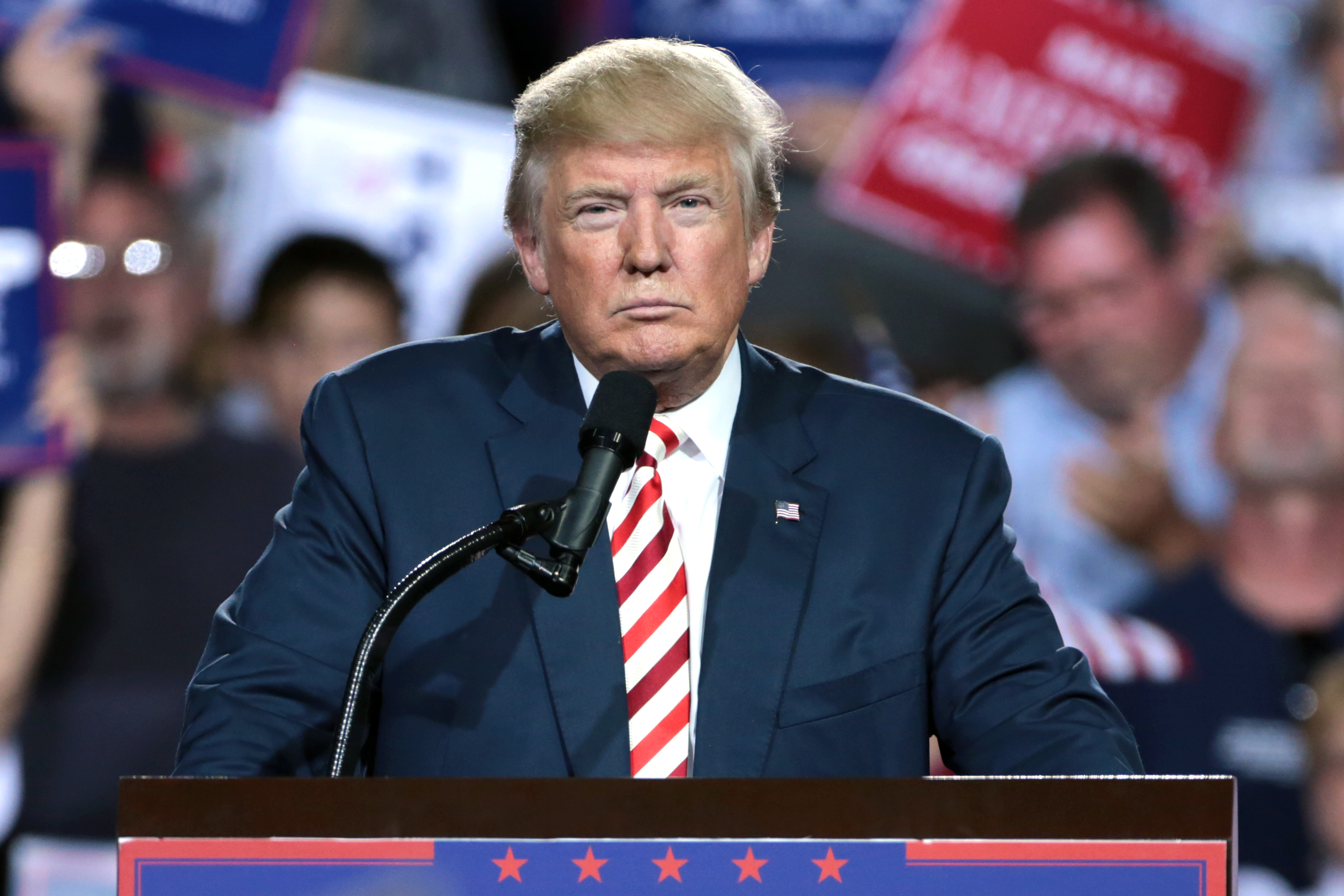
Prescott Valley, Arizona, 10/04/2016

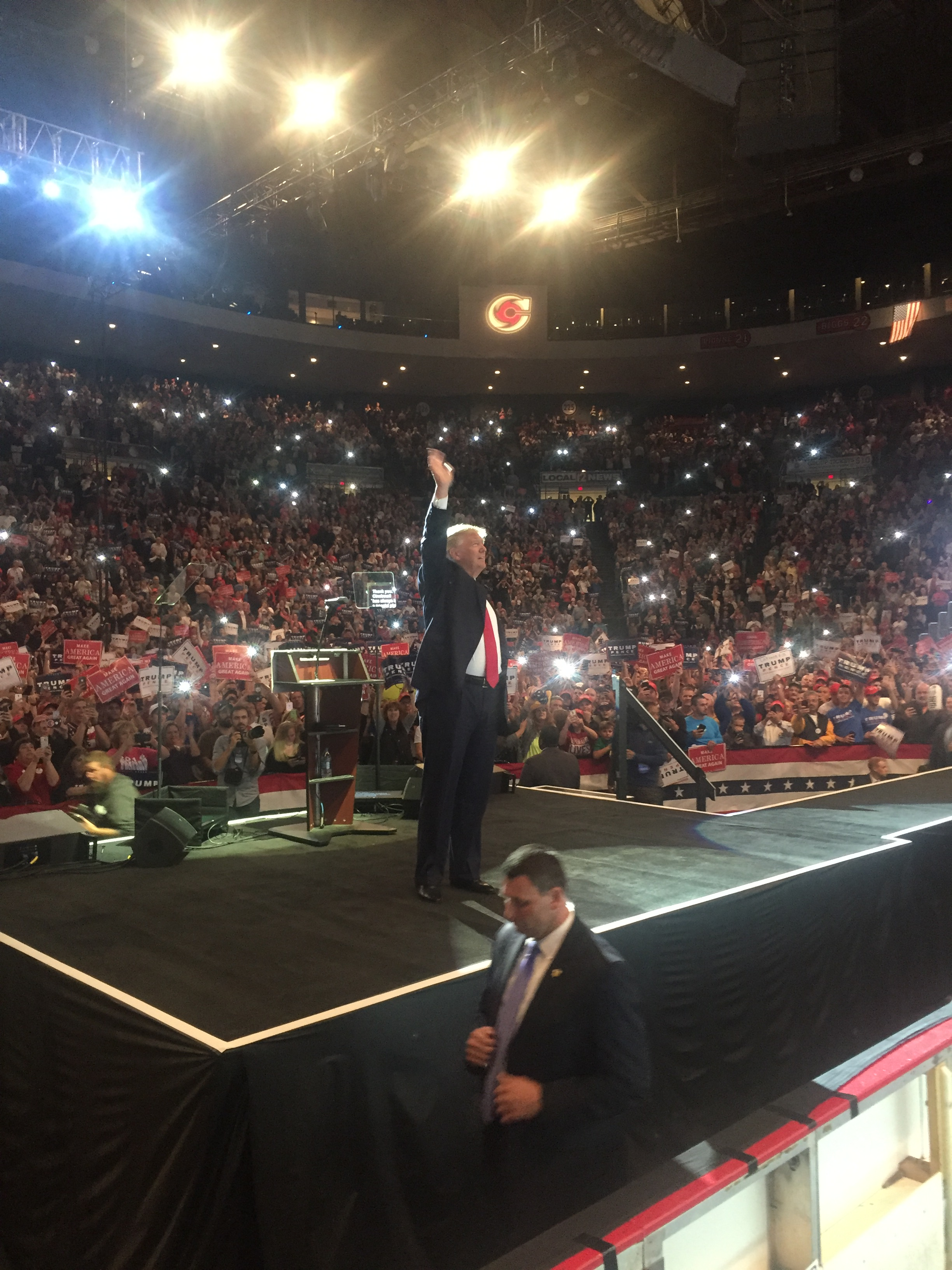
Cincinnati, Ohio, 10/13/2016

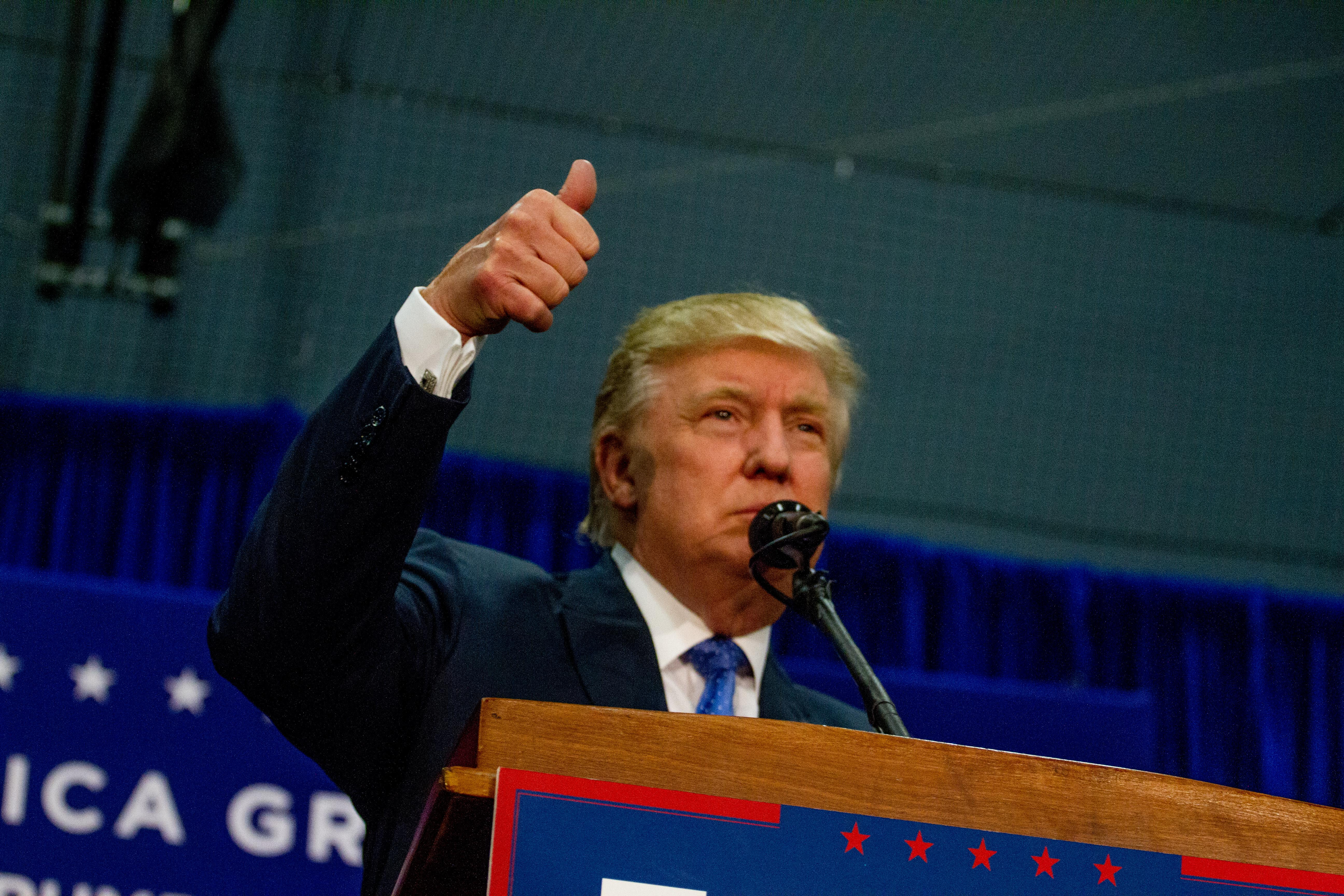
Newtown, Pennsylvania, 10/21/2016

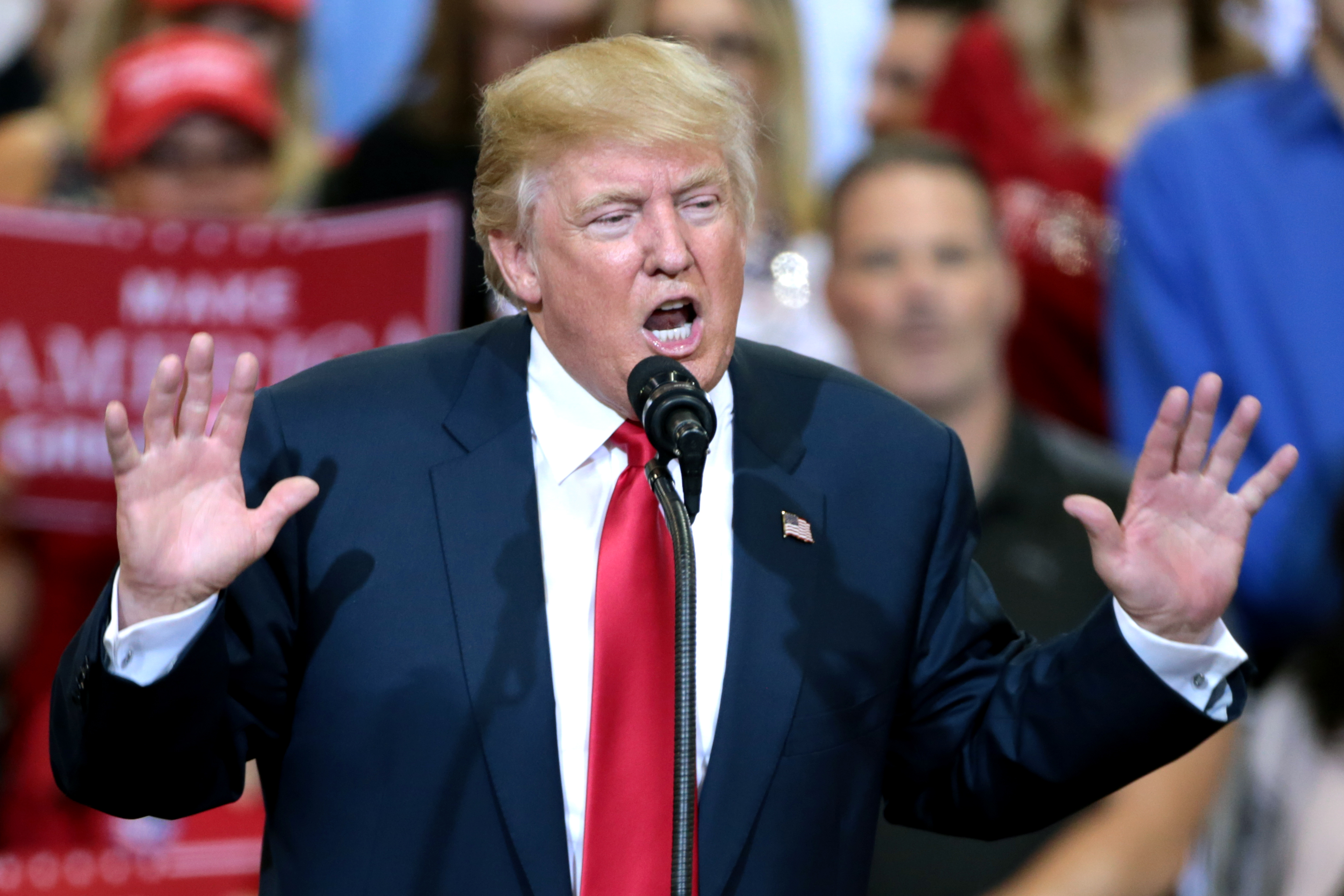
Phoenix, Arizona, 10/29/2016

General election rallies (June–November 2016)
Date of Rally	City	State	Venue	Estimated Visitors	Source
Friday, June 10, 2016	Richmond	VA	Richmond Coliseum	5,000	
Saturday, June 11, 2016	Moon	PA	Atlantic Aviation PIT, Pittsburgh International Airport	1,500	
Saturday, June 11, 2016	Tampa	FL	Tampa Convention Center	4,000	
Tuesday, June 14, 2016	Greensboro	NC	Greensboro Coliseum Complex	6,200	
Wednesday, June 15, 2016	Atlanta	GA	Fox Theatre	3,500	
Thursday, June 16, 2016	Dallas	TX	Gilley's Club	3,600	
Friday, June 17, 2016	The Woodlands	TX	The Woodlands Waterway Marriott Hotel & Conference Center	5,000	
Saturday, June 18, 2016	Las Vegas	NV	Mystère Theatre, Treasure Island Hotel and Casino	1,600	See also: 2016 Donald Trump Las Vegas rally incident
Saturday, June 18, 2016	Phoenix	AZ	Arizona Veterans Memorial Coliseum, Arizona State Fairgrounds	6,000	
Tuesday, June 28, 2016	St. Clairsville	OH	Health and Physical Education Center, Ohio University Eastern Campus	4,000	
Wednesday, June 29, 2016	Bangor	ME	Cross Insurance Center	4,000	
Tuesday, July 5, 2016	Raleigh	NC	Raleigh Memorial Auditorium, Duke Energy Center for the Performing Arts	2,300	
Wednesday, July 6, 2016	Cincinnati	OH	Sharonville Convention Center	7,000	
Tuesday, July 12, 2016	Westfield	IN	Grand Park Event Center, Grand Park	2,000	
Monday, July 25, 2016	Winston-Salem	NC	Winston-Salem Fairground Annex, Dixie Classic Fairgrounds	4,700	
Wednesday, July 27, 2016	Scranton	PA	Student Union Gymnasium, Lackawanna College	3,500	
Wednesday, July 27, 2016	Toledo	OH	Huntington Center	8,900	
Thursday, July 28, 2016	Cedar Rapids	IA	DoubleTree Hotel Cedar Rapids Convention Complex	3,000	
Thursday, July 28, 2016	Davenport	IA	Adler Theatre	2,400	
Friday, July 29, 2016	Colorado Springs	CO	Gallogly Event Center, University of Colorado Colorado Springs	2,500	
Friday, July 29, 2016	Denver	CO	Wings Over the Rockies Air and Space Museum	6,000	
Monday, August 1, 2016	Columbus	OH	Greater Columbus Convention Center	1,000	
Monday, August 1, 2016	Mechanicsburg	PA	Cumberland Valley High School	5,000	
Tuesday, August 2, 2016	Ashburn	VA	Briar Woods High School	800	
Wednesday, August 3, 2016	Daytona Beach	FL	Ocean Center	10,000	
Wednesday, August 3, 2016	Jacksonville	FL	Jacksonville Veterans Memorial Arena	10,000	
Thursday, August 4, 2016	Portland	ME	Merrill Auditorium	1,600	
Friday, August 5, 2016	Des Moines	IA	Iowa Events Center	6,000	
Friday, August 5, 2016	Green Bay	WI	KI Convention Center	3,000	
Saturday, August 6, 2016	Windham	NH	Windham High School	1,500	
Tuesday, August 9, 2016	Fayetteville	NC	Crown Arena	3,000	
Tuesday, August 9, 2016	Wilmington	NC	Trask Coliseum, University of North Carolina at Wilmington		
Wednesday, August 10, 2016	Sunrise	FL	BB&T Center		
Thursday, August 11, 2016	Kissimmee	FL	Silver Spurs Arena	8,000	
Friday, August 12, 2016	Altoona	PA	Blair County Convention Center	5,000	
Friday, August 12, 2016	Erie	PA	Erie Insurance Arena	8,000	
Saturday, August 13, 2016	Fairfield	CT	William H. Pitt Center, Sacred Heart University	5,000	
Tuesday, August 16, 2016	West Bend	WI	Ziegler Family Expo Center, Washington County Fair Park & Conference Center	2,000	
Thursday, August 18, 2016	Charlotte	NC	Charlotte Convention Center	5,000	
Friday, August 19, 2016	Dimondale	MI	The Summit Sports and Ice Complex	5,000	
Saturday, August 20, 2016	Fredericksburg	VA	Fredericksburg Expo & Conference Center	3,600	
Monday, August 22, 2016	Akron	OH	James A. Rhodes Arena, University of Akron	5,000	
Tuesday, August 23, 2016	Austin	TX	Luedecke Arena	7,000	
Wednesday, August 24, 2016	Tampa	FL	Entertainment Hall, Florida State Fairgrounds	3,000	
Wednesday, August 24, 2016	Jackson	MS	Mississippi Coliseum		
Thursday, August 25, 2016	Manchester	NH	Radisson Hotel Manchester Downtown	900	
Tuesday, August 30, 2016	Everett	WA	Xfinity Arena		
Wednesday, August 31, 2016	Phoenix	AZ	Phoenix Convention Center	7,500	
Thursday, September 1, 2016	Wilmington	OH	Roberts Centre	5,500	
Tuesday, September 6, 2016	Greenville	NC	Greenville Convention Center	3,000	
Friday, September 9, 2016	Pensacola	FL	Pensacola Bay Center	12,500	
Monday, September 12, 2016	Asheville	NC	U.S. Cellular Center	6,000	
Tuesday, September 13	Clive	IA	7 Flags Event Center	1,600	
Tuesday, September 13	Aston	PA		?	
Wednesday, September 14, 2016	Canton	OH	Canton Memorial Civic Center	6,000	
Thursday, September 15, 2016	Laconia	NH	Laconia Middle School	600	Related: Crowd coverage/views available at Right Side Broadcasting Network via YouTube.
Friday, September 16, 2016	Miami	FL	Knight Center Complex		Related:
Saturday, September 17, 2016	Colorado Springs	CO	Colorado Jet Center, Colorado Springs Airport		
Monday, September 19, 2016	Estero	FL	Germain Arena	8,000	
Tuesday, September 20, 2016	High Point	NC	Millis Athletic Convocation Center, High Point University	2,000	
Tuesday, September 20, 2016	Kenansville	NC	Duplin County Events Center	6,000	
Wednesday, September 21, 2016	Toledo	OH	Stranahan Theater		
Thursday, September 22, 2016	Chester Township	PA	Sun Center Studios	3,000	
Saturday, September 24, 2016	Roanoke	VA	Berglund Center	9,000	
Tuesday, September 27, 2016	Melbourne	FL	Melbourne Orlando International Airport		
Wednesday, September 28, 2016	Council Bluffs	IA	Mid-America Center	1,200	
Wednesday, September 28, 2016	Waukesha	WI	Waukesha County Expo Center	1,500	
Thursday, September 29, 2016	Bedford	NH	NH Sportsplex	900	
Friday, September 30, 2016	Novi	MI	Suburban Collection Showplace	6,000	
Saturday, October 1, 2016	Manheim	PA	Spooky Nook Sports	6,000	
Monday, October 3, 2016	Pueblo	CO	Pueblo Convention Center	2,000	
Monday, October 3, 2016	Loveland	CO	Budweiser Events Center	8,000	
Tuesday, October 4, 2016	Prescott Valley	AZ	Prescott Valley Event Center	7,000	
Wednesday, October 5, 2016	Henderson	NV	Henderson Pavilion	7,000	
Wednesday, October 5, 2016	Reno	NV	Reno-Sparks Convention Center		
Monday, October 10, 2016	Ambridge	PA	Ambridge Area High School	3,000	
Monday, October 10, 2016	Wilkes-Barre	PA	Mohegan Sun Arena at Casey Plaza	9,000	
Tuesday, October 11, 2016	Panama City Beach	FL	Aaron Bessant Amphitheater, Aaron Bessant Park	8,500	
Wednesday, October 12, 2016	Ocala	FL	Southeastern Livestock Pavilion	12,000	
Wednesday, October 12, 2016	Lakeland	FL	Lakeland Linder International Airport	7,000	
Thursday, October 13, 2016	West Palm Beach	FL	South Florida Fairgrounds Expo Center	6,000	
Thursday, October 13, 2016	Cincinnati	OH	U.S. Bank Arena	21,000	
Friday, October 14, 2016	Greensboro	NC	White Oak Amphitheatre	4,000	
Friday, October 14, 2016	Charlotte	NC	Charlotte Convention Center	5,000	
Saturday, October 15, 2016	Portsmouth	NH	Toyota of Portsmouth	7,000	
Saturday, October 15, 2016	Bangor	ME	Cross Insurance Center	4,000	
Monday, October 17, 2016	Green Bay	WI	KI Convention Center	3,000	
Tuesday, October 18	Colorado Springs	CO	Norris-Penrose Event Center		
Tuesday, October 18	Grand Junction	CO	West Star Aviation, Grand Junction Regional Airport		
Thursday, October 20, 2016	Delaware	OH	Delaware County Fair	1,500	
Friday, October 21, 2016	Fletcher	NC	WNC Agricultural Center	3,100	
Friday, October 21, 2016	Johnstown	PA	Cambria County War Memorial Arena	4,000	
Friday, October 21, 2016	Newtown Township	PA	Newtown Athletic Club Sports Training Center	4,000	
Saturday, October 22, 2016	Virginia Beach	VA	Library Plaza, Regent University	10,000	
Saturday, October 22, 2016	Cleveland	OH	I-X Center		
Sunday, October 23, 2016	Naples	FL	Collier County Fairgrounds	12,000	
Monday, October 24, 2016	St. Augustine	FL	St. Augustine Amphitheatre		
Monday, October 24, 2016	Tampa	FL	MidFlorida Credit Union Amphitheatre	15–28,000	
Tuesday, October 25, 2016	Sanford	FL	Million Air Orlando, Orlando Sanford International Airport	10,000	
Tuesday, October 25, 2016	Tallahassee	FL	Tallahassee Car Museum		
Wednesday, October 26, 2016	Kinston	NC	Kinston Jet Center, Kinston Regional Jetport	3,100	
Thursday, October 27, 2016	Springfield	OH	Clark County Fairgrounds	5,000	
Thursday, October 27, 2016	Toledo	OH	SeaGate Convention Centre	2,900	
Thursday, October 27, 2016	Geneva	OH	Track and Field Building, SPIRE Institute	5,000	
Friday, October 28, 2016	Manchester	NH	Radisson Hotel Manchester Downtown		
Friday, October 28, 2016	Lisbon	ME	Open Door Christian Academy	1,200	
Friday, October 28, 2016	Cedar Rapids	IA	McGrath Amphitheatre	5,000	
Saturday, October 29, 2016	Golden	CO	Jefferson County Events Center		
Saturday, October 29, 2016	Phoenix	AZ	Phoenix Convention Center	8,000	
Sunday, October 30, 2016	Las Vegas	NV	The Venetian Las Vegas	8,400	
Sunday, October 30, 2016	Greeley	CO	Bank of Colorado Arena, University of Northern Colorado	3,000	
Sunday, October 30, 2016	Albuquerque	NM	Atlantic Aviation ABQ, Albuquerque International Sunport	4,000	
Monday, October 31, 2016	Grand Rapids	MI	DeltaPlex Arena	6,500	
Monday, October 31, 2016	Warren	MI	Sports & Expo Center, Macomb Community College South Campus	5,000	
Tuesday, November 1, 2016	Eau Claire	WI	W.L. Zorn Arena	3,000	
Wednesday, November 2, 2016	Orlando	FL	CFE Arena, Central Florida Fairgrounds	10,000	
Wednesday, November 2, 2016	Pensacola	FL	Maritime Park's Hunter Amphitheater	6–10,000	
Wednesday, November 2, 2016	Miami	FL	Bayfront Park	2,600	
Thursday, November 3, 2016	Jacksonville	FL	Jacksonville Equestrian Center	4,000	
Thursday, November 3, 2016	Concord	NC	Cabarrus Arena & Events Center	4,200	
Thursday, November 3, 2016	Selma	NC	The Farm	15,000	
Friday, November 4, 2016	Atkinson	NH	Atkinson Country Club	1,000	
Friday, November 4, 2016	Wilmington	OH	Airborne Maintenance & Engineering Services, Inc	3,000	
Friday, November 4, 2016	Hershey	PA	Giant Center	13,000	
Saturday, November 5, 2016	Tampa	FL	Florida State Fairgrounds	5–20,000	
Saturday, November 5, 2016	Wilmington	NC	Wilmington International Airport	5,000	
Saturday, November 5, 2016	Reno	NV	Reno-Sparks Convention Center	8,000	
Saturday, November 5, 2016	Denver	CO	National Western Complex	8,000	
Sunday, November 6, 2016	Sioux City	IA	Sioux City Convention Center	4,500	
Sunday, November 6, 2016	Minneapolis	MN	Sun Country Airlines	9–20,000	
Sunday, November 6, 2016	Sterling Heights	MI	Freedom Hill Amphitheater, Freedom Hill County Park	8,000	
Sunday, November 6, 2016	Moon Township	PA	Atlantic Aviation	12,000	
Sunday, November 6, 2016	Leesburg	VA	Agricultural hall, Loudoun Fairgrounds	9–20,000	
Monday, November 7, 2016	Sarasota	FL	Robarts Arena, Sarasota County Fairgrounds	5,000	
Monday, November 7, 2016	Raleigh	NC	Dorton Arena	7,000	
Monday, November 7, 2016	Scranton	PA	Lackawanna College Student Union	5,000	
Monday, November 7, 2016	Manchester	NH	SNHU Arena	12,000	
Monday, November 7, 2016	Grand Rapids	MI	DeVos Place Convention Center	4,200	

== Post-2016 election ==
- "USA Thank You" tour during transition
- Post-2017 inauguration/campaign 2020 rallies (2017–2020)

== Musical selections at events ==
Music by the following artists and groups was used at various Trump campaign rallies during 2015 and 2016: Elton John, The Beatles, Adele, Andrew Lloyd Webber, Pavarotti / Puccini, Journey, R.E.M., Neil Young, Twisted Sister, Rolling Stones, Queen, Aerosmith, Wagner, Kenny G, Johnny Cash, Creedence Clearwater Revival, Billy Joel, Bill Conti, John Mellencamp, Joe Esposito, Survivor, The Shangri-Las, Cab Calloway, Frankie Valli, The Alan Parsons Project, Paul Rodgers, Travie McCoy, Bruce Springsteen, Led Zeppelin, the London Bach Choir, and the songs of Victor Hugo's Les Misérables.

== See also ==
- List of Donald Trump rallies (December 2016–2022), including rallies for Trump's unsuccessful re-election campaign
- List of rallies for the 2024 Donald Trump presidential campaign, including rallies for Trump's second successful campaign
- List of Donald Trump rallies (2025–present)
