= Chester, Pennsylvania (disambiguation) =

Chester, Pennsylvania, can refer to a location in the U.S. state of Pennsylvania:

- Chester, Pennsylvania, city in Delaware County
- Chester County, Pennsylvania
- Chester Township, Delaware County, Pennsylvania
- West Chester, Pennsylvania, a borough in Chester County, Pennsylvania
- Chester Springs, Pennsylvania
