= Sun Center Studios =

Television and film sound stage

Sun Center Studios is a television and film sound stage located in Chester Township, Delaware County, Pennsylvania (Aston ZIP code). Opened in 2011, it is Pennsylvania's first purpose-built studio.

== Filmography ==
Films shot at the studio include:

- After Earth, 2013 film directed by M. Night Shyamalan and starring Will Smith
- Paranoia, 2013 film starring Liam Hemsworth, Gary Oldman, and Harrison Ford
- Creed, 2015 film starring Michael B. Jordan and Sylvester Stallone
- The Benefactor, 2015 film starring Richard Gere and Dakota Fanning
- The Visit, 2015 film written, directed and produced by M. Night Shyamalan
- Split, 2016 film written, directed and produced by M. Night Shyamalan
- The Upside, 2017 film starring Kevin Hart, Bryan Cranston and Nicole Kidman
- Creed II, 2018 film starring Michael B. Jordan and Sylvester Stallone
- Glass, 2019 film starring James McAvoy, Bruce Willis and Samuel L. Jackson
- Servant, 2019 TV series
- Dispatches from Elsewhere, 2020 TV series
- Mare of Easttown, 2021 TV series starring Kate Winslet
- Hustle, 2022 film starring Adam Sandler
- Knock at the Cabin, 2023 film written, directed and produced by M. Night Shyamalan
