= Chester Township, Pennsylvania =

Township in Pennsylvania, US

- Home rule municipality
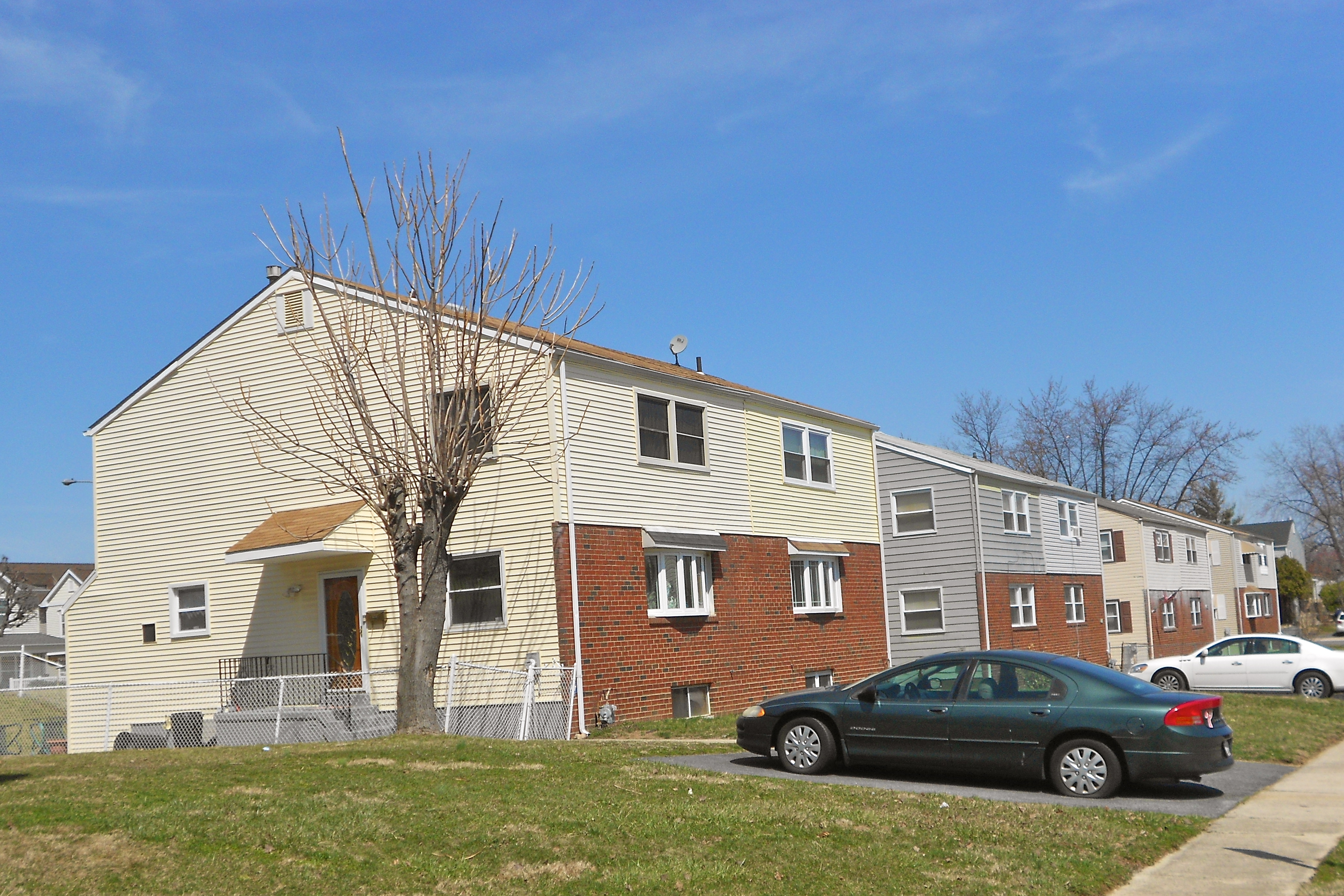
- Apartments in the township

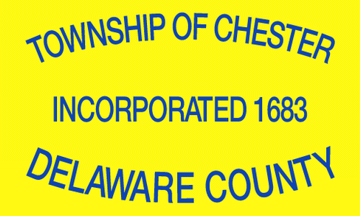
- Flag Seal

- Location in Delaware County and the state of Pennsylvania.

- Location of Pennsylvania in the United States
- Coordinates: 39°51′00″N 75°24′00″W
- Country: United States
- State: Pennsylvania
- County: Delaware

Area
  - Total: 1.43 sq mi (3.70 km^{2})
  - Land: 1.43 sq mi (3.70 km^{2})
  - Water: 0 sq mi (0.00 km^{2})
- Elevation: 0 ft (0 m)

Population (2020)
  - Total: 4,080
  - Density: 2,856.8/sq mi (1,103.03/km^{2})
- Time zone: UTC-5 (EST)
  - Summer (DST): UTC-4 (EDT)
- ZIP code: 19013
- Area codes: 610 and 484
- FIPS code: 42-045-13212
- GNIS feature ID: 1216379
- Website: townshipofchester.com

Chester Township is a township in Delaware County, Pennsylvania, United States. The population was 4,080 at the 2020 census, up from 3,940 at the 2010 census.

The Sun Center Studios are located in Chester Township.

== History ==
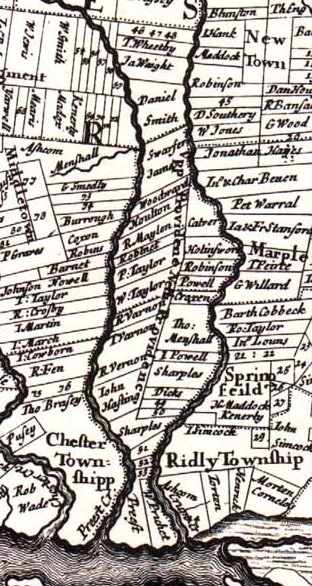
1687HolmeMapProvRoad

Chester Township is one of the first districts established after William Penn's first visit in 1682. The first record of Chester Township is in court documents from 1683 where a grand jury of seventeen people were "Impannelled to take out a Convenient Highway leading from Providence to Chester."

During the American Revolutionary War, Chester township, which included the borough of Chester at the time, suffered greatly under the British Army. A list of the losses sustained was made and is preserved at the Historical Society of Pennsylvania.

== Geography ==
Chester Township is located in southern Delaware County at 39°50′43″N 75°23′37″W (39.845411, -75.393857). It is bordered to the south by the city of Chester, to the east by the borough of Upland, to the northeast by the borough of Brookhaven, to the north by Aston Township, and to the west by Upper Chichester Township.

According to the United States Census Bureau, the township has a total area of 1.4 square miles (3.7 km^{2}), all land. Chester Creek, a southeast-flowing tributary of the Delaware River, flows through the township.

== Demographics ==
Historical population
Census	Pop.	Note	%±
1930	2,073		—
1940	1,988		−4.1%
1950	3,547		78.4%
1960	3,602		1.6%
1970	5,708		58.5%
1980	5,687		−0.4%
1990	5,399		−5.1%
2000	4,604		−14.7%
2010	3,940		−14.4%
2020	4,080		3.6%

=== 2020 census ===
Chester Township, Delaware County, Pennsylvania – Racial and ethnic composition Note: the US Census treats Hispanic/Latino as an ethnic category. This table excludes Latinos from the racial categories and assigns them to a separate category. Hispanics/Latinos may be of any race.
Race / Ethnicity (NH = Non-Hispanic)	Pop 2000	Pop 2010	Pop 2020	% 2000	% 2010	% 2020
White alone (NH)	1,022	620	491	22.20	15.74%	12.03%
Black or African American alone (NH)	3,354	3,030	3,147	72.85%	76.90%	77.13%
Native American or Alaska Native alone (NH)	12	6	3	0.26%	0.15%	0.07%
Asian alone (NH)	27	19	55	0.59%	0.48%	1.35%
Pacific Islander alone (NH)	1	0	0	0.02%	0.00%	0.00%
Other race alone (NH)	8	5	13	0.17%	0.13%	0.32%
Mixed race or Multiracial (NH)	85	105	147	1.85%	2.66%	3.60%
Hispanic or Latino (any race)	95	155	224	2.06%	3.93%	5.49%
Total	4,604	3,940	4,080	100.00%	100.00%	100.00%

=== 2010 census ===
As of Census 2010, the racial makeup of the township was 16.9% White, 78.3% African American, 0.2% Native American, 0.5% Asian, 1.1% from other races, and 3.0% from two or more races. Hispanic or Latino of any race were 3.9% of the population .

As of the census of 2000, there were 4,604 people, 1,641 households, and 1,188 families residing in the township. The population density was 3,301.7 inhabitants per square mile (1,274.8/km^{2}). There were 1,754 housing units at an average density of 1,257.8 units per square mile (485.6 units/km^{2}). The racial makeup of the township was 22.72% White, 73.33% African American, 0.26% Native American, 0.59% Asian, 0.02% Pacific Islander, 0.96% from other races, and 2.13% from two or more races. 2.06% of the population were Hispanic or Latino of any race.

There were 1,641 households, out of which 39.7% had children under the age of 18 living with them, 35.1% were married couples living together, 30.8% had a female householder with no husband present, and 27.6% were non-families. 23.0% of all households were made up of individuals, and 5.8% had someone living alone who was 65 years of age or older. The average household size was 2.81 and the average family size was 3.31.

In the township the population was spread out, with 33.7% under the age of 18, 7.9% from 18 to 24, 29.5% from 25 to 44, 21.4% from 45 to 64, and 7.5% who were 65 years of age or older. The median age was 32 years. For every 100 females, there were 84.6 males. For every 100 women age 18 and over, there were 75.6 men.

The median income for a household in the township was $32,576, and the median income for a family was $34,391. Males had a median income of $31,845 versus $25,286 for females. The per capita income for the township was $16,072. About 16.2% of families and 17.1% of the population were below the poverty line, including 24.0% of those under age 18 and 23.3% of those age 65 or over.

== Education ==
Residents in Chester Township are zoned to the Chester-Upland School District. Toby Farms Elementary School is the public elementary school in Chester Township. Residents are also zoned to Smedley Middle School and Chester High School.

== Transportation ==
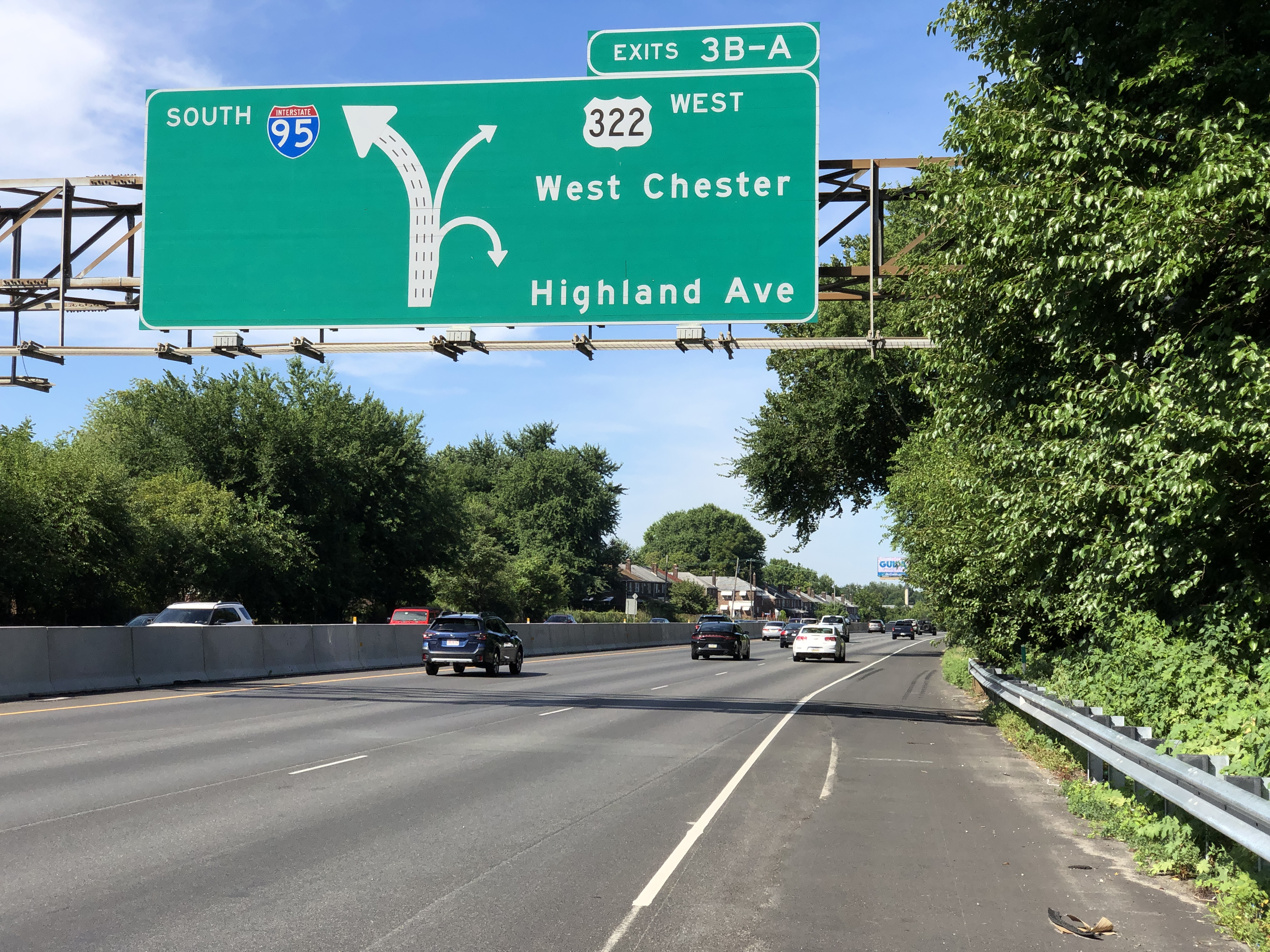
I-95 southbound and US 322 westbound in Chester Township

As of 2015, there were 13.79 miles (22.19 km) of public roads in Chester Township, of which 3.94 miles (6.34 km) were maintained by Pennsylvania Department of Transportation (PennDOT) and 9.85 miles (15.85 km) were maintained by the township.

Interstate 95 crosses the southern part of the township. It runs concurrently with U.S. Route 322 between Exit 3 and Exit 4.

== Notable person ==
- Samuel Edwards - U.S. Congressman from Pennsylvania
