= Scott Plakon =

Florida State Representative

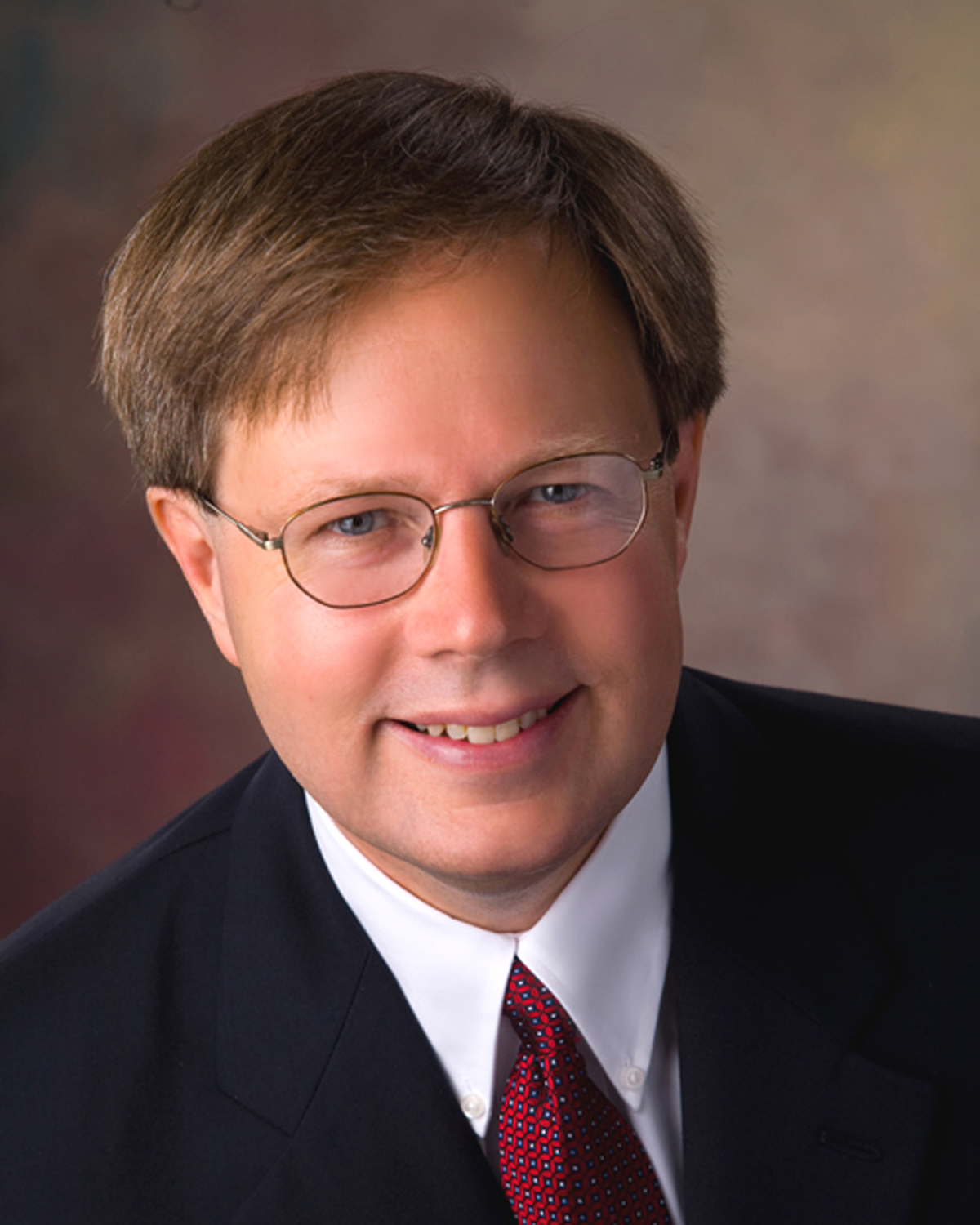
- Official portrait, 2008

Member of the Florida House of Representatives
- In office November 4, 2014 – November 8, 2022
- Preceded by: Mike Clelland
- Succeeded by: Webster Barnaby (redistricted)
- Constituency: 29th district
- In office November 4, 2008 – November 6, 2012
- Preceded by: David Simmons
- Succeeded by: Richard Corcoran (redistricted)
- Constituency: 37th district

Personal details
- Born: March 13, 1959 (age 67) Rochester, New York, U.S.
- Party: Republican
- Spouse: Rachel Plakon (m. 2019)
- Children: 6
- Education: Stetson University (BS)
- Profession: Publisher

Scott Plakon (born March 13, 1959) is an American politician who served as a member of the Florida House of Representatives for the 37th district from 2008 to 2012 and 29th district from 2014 to 2022.

== Early life and education ==
Plakon was born in Rochester, New York, and attended Arcadia High School in Greece, but moved to the state of Florida to attend Stetson University in 1977, where he graduated with a degree in psychology in 1981.

== Career ==
After graduation, he started a publishing company that provided universities with telephone directories, eventually founding The Claims Pages, a publication for insurance claims adjusters. Plakon has six children.

=== Florida House of Representatives ===
In 2008, incumbent State Representative David Simmons was unable to seek re-election due to term limits, so Plakon ran to succeed him in the 37th District, which included parts of Altamonte Springs, Apopka, Longwood, and Winter Park in Orange County and Seminole County. Plakon was opposed by Timothy Moriarty in the Republican primary, but he defeated him easily, winning 69% of the vote. He was unopposed in the general election, and again when he ran for re-election in 2010. In 2012, Plakon, a supporter of legislation that submitted welfare recipients to drug testing, appeared on The Daily Show, where correspondent Aasif Mandvi interviewed him about his support. During interview, Mandvi challenged Plakon to take a drug test, which he declined to do, and to support legislation requiring that state legislators pass a drug test, which he also declined to do.

Following the 2012 redistricting, Plakon was moved into the same legislative district as fellow State Representative Chris Dorworth, and, to avoid a contentious primary, opted to run for re-election in the 30th District, where he did not live. Plakon won the Republican primary unopposed, and advanced to the general election, where he faced teacher Karen Castor Dentel, the Democratic nominee. Plakon, for instance, campaigned on his opposition to abortion and his support for the controversial "parent trigger" legislation and a constitutional amendment "that would allow the state to give taxpayer money to religious organizations," while Castor Dentel took opposite positions. Castor Dentel was endorsed by the Orlando Sentinel over Plakon, which criticized him for putting "too much of his energy into ideological crusades" and for "hoping voters overlook his right-wing record." Ultimately, Plakon lost his bid for re-election, receiving only 47% of the vote to Castor Dentel's 53%.

In 2014, rather than seek a rematch with Castor Dentel, Plakon moved into the 29th District, challenging State Representative Mike Clelland, a Democrat. He won the Republican primary uncontested, and faced Clelland in the general election. The Sentinel once again endorsed Plakon's opponent, praising Clelland for his "valuable insight" and for making "ethics reform his signature issue." They praised Plakon for being a "productive legislator," but condemned the fact that he "put too much effort into polarizing issues like abortion and state aid to religious institutions." In the end, Plakon defeated Clelland handily, scoring 57% to the incumbent's 43%.

In 2020, he cosponsored a bipartisan bill to eliminate time limits for the prosecution for sexual assault of minors.

Plakon can serve in the Florida House until 2022 due to term limits.

== Personal life ==
Plakon's first wife, Susie Plakon, died from Alzheimer's disease on July 23, 2018. His second wife, Rachel Plakon, was elected to represent the 36th district of the Florida House of Representatives on November 8, 2022.

== See also ==
- Florida House of Representatives

Florida House of Representatives
Preceded by David Simmons	Member of the Florida House of Representatives from the 37th district 2008–2012	Succeeded by Richard Corcoran
Preceded by Mike Clelland	Member of the Florida House of Representatives from the 29th district 2014–2022	Succeeded by Webster Barnaby
