= Stan Bainter =

American politician (1931–2018)

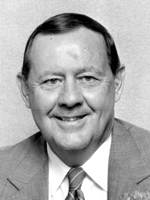

Member of the Florida House of Representatives from Florida
- In office November 4, 1986 – November 7, 2000
- Preceded by: Bobby Brantley
- Succeeded by: Carey Baker
- Constituency: 27th District (1986–1992); 25th District (1992–2000)

Personal details
- Born: January 23, 1931 Macomb, Illinois, U.S.
- Died: December 9, 2018 (aged 87)
- Party: Republican
- Children: Jon, Dara, Patrick
- Education: University of Miami; Valencia Community College; United States Armed Forces Institute
- Occupation: Insurance salesman

Stanley E. "Stan" Bainter was a Republican politician and insurance salesman who served as a member of the Florida House of Representatives from 1986 to 2000.

== Early life and career ==
Bainter was born in Macomb, Illinois, and joined the Illinois National Guard after graduating high school, serving for two years in the Korean War. He moved to Florida in 1959, first settling in Miami, and then moved to Lake County in 1967, where he operated an insurance business.

== Florida House of Representatives ==
In 1986, Republican State Representative Bobby Brantley opted to successfully run for Lieutenant Governor on a ticket with Tampa Mayor Bob Martinez rather than seek re-election to the State House. Bainter ran to succeed him in the 27th District, which stretched from Palatka to Longwood and included parts of Lake, Marion, Putnam, Seminole, and Volusia counties.

He ran in a crowded Republican primary that included automobile dealer Joe Creamons, real estate agent Greg Gay, physician Tully Patrowicz, child care specialist Dick Van Der Weide, and Jim Williamson. In the primary, Bainter placed second, winning 22 percent of the vote, and advanced to a runoff election against Patrowicz, who placed first with 28 percent. In the runoff, Bainter defeated Patrowicz by a wide margin, winning 60 percent of the vote. He faced Democratic nominee Jeff Book, a former aide to State Representative Everett Kelly, in the general election. Bainter defeated Book by a wide margin, receiving 58 percent of the vote to Book's 42 percent.

Bainter was unopposed for re-election in 1988. In 1990, he was challenged by Democratic nominee Clay Reynolds, a Longwood chiropractor. Bainter won a third term over Reynolds with 57 percent of the vote.

Following the reconfiguration of Florida's legislative districts after the 1990 Census, Bainter ran for re-election in the 25th District, which traded the previous district's reach into Palatka for more of Lake County. He was challenged by Mount Dora businesswoman Ronni Collins, who won the Democratic nomination. Bainter defeated Collins in a landslide, winning re-election with 60 percent of the vote. He was re-elected without opposition in 1994.

In 1996, Bainter considered running for the State Senate to succeed State Senator Karen Johnson in the 11th District, but he ultimately decided to seek re-election. As a result, he faced former congressional aide Ron Phillips, who had announced plans to run for Bainter's seat, in the Republican primary. Though the contest between Bainter and Phillips was negative, Bainter won renomination in a landslide, receiving 63 percent of the vote. In the general election, Bainter faced former Lake County School Board member Sandra Green, the Democratic nominee. Bainter ultimately defeated Green by a wide margin, receiving 58 percent of the vote.

Bainter was re-elected to his seventh term unopposed in 1998, and was term-limited in 2000.

== Post-legislative career ==
In 2002, Bainter ran for a seat on the Lake County Water Authority, and won unopposed. He did not seek re-election in 2006, and advocated for greater state-level regulation of special districts.

Bainter died on December 9, 2018.
