= David Karem =

American politician

Minority Leader of the Kentucky Senate
- In office October 26, 1999 – January 6, 2003
- Preceded by: David Williams
- Succeeded by: Ed Worley

Majority Leader of the Kentucky Senate
- In office January 5, 1993 – August 22, 1999
- Whip: Fred Bradley; Walter Blevins
- Preceded by: Joe Wright
- Succeeded by: Dan Kelly

Member of the Kentucky Senate from the 35th district
- In office January 1, 1976 – January 1, 2005
- Preceded by: Lacey Smith
- Succeeded by: Denise Harper Angel

Member of the Kentucky House of Representatives from the 34th district
- In office January 1, 1972 – January 1, 1976
- Preceded by: Wilson Wyatt Jr.
- Succeeded by: Gerta Bendl

Personal details
- Born: August 31, 1943 (age 82) Louisville, Kentucky
- Party: Democratic

David K. Karem (born August 31, 1943) was an American politician in the state of Kentucky. He served in the Kentucky Senate and in the Kentucky House of Representatives. Karem was elected to the senate in 1975 when incumbent Lacey Smith did not run for reelection. He did not seek reelection to the senate in 2004. He is a Democrat. His father was from Lebanon, the late federal judge Fred Karem Kairouz.
