= Karen Castor Dentel =

American politician (born 1968)

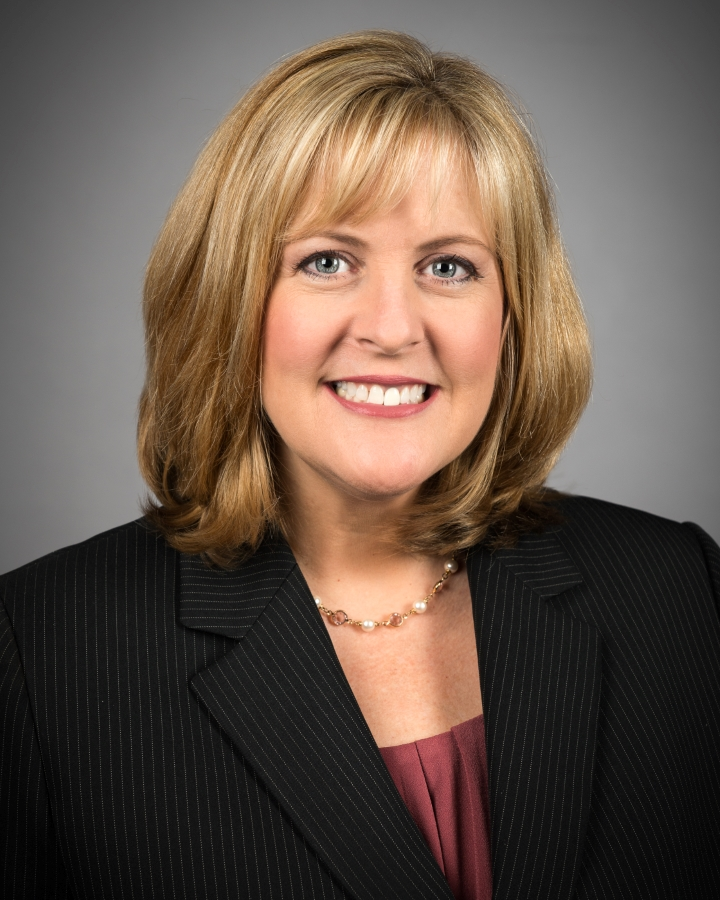

Orange County Supervisor of Elections
- Incumbent
- Assumed office January 7, 2025
- Preceded by: Glen Gilzean

Member of the Orange County School Board from the 6th district
- In office November 27, 2018 – November 19, 2024
- Preceding: Nancy Robbinson
- Succeeded by: Stephanie Vanos

Member of the Florida House of Representatives from the 30th district
- In office November 6, 2012 – November 4, 2014
- Preceded by: Scott Plakon
- Succeeded by: Bob Cortes

Personal details
- Born: September 8, 1968 (age 58) Tampa, Florida, United States
- Party: Democratic
- Spouse: Eric Dentel
- Children: 2
- Parent(s): Donald Castor; Betty Castor
- Relatives: Kathy Castor (sister)
- Education: Vanderbilt University (B.S.); University of North Carolina at Chapel Hill (M.Ed.); University of Florida (Ph.D.)
- Profession: Educator

Karen Castor Dentel (born September 8, 1968) is an American politician who has served as the supervisor of elections of Orange County, Florida, since 2025. A member of the Democratic Party, she previously served as a member of the Orange County School Board from 2018 to 2024 and in the Florida House of Representatives from 2012 to 2014.

== History ==
Castor Dentel was born in Tampa to Donald Castor, a former Hillsborough County Judge, and Betty Castor, who served as the President of the University of South Florida, Florida Education Commissioner, State Senator, and the 2004 Democratic nominee for the United States Senate. Her sister, Kathy Castor, is currently a United States Congresswoman from Florida's 14th congressional district. Her brother, Frank Castor, is currently a Judge in Palm Beach County, Florida. She graduated from Chamberlain High School and then attended Vanderbilt University, where she received a bachelor's degree in elementary education in 1990. Castor Dentel then attended the University of North Carolina at Chapel Hill, receiving her Master of Education in literacy studies in 1993. Finally, she attended the University of Florida, receiving her PhD in curriculum and instruction in 2001. Castor Dentel has taught elementary school for a total of fifteen years throughout Orange County Public Schools and with the School Board of Alachua County in Gainesville, FL.

Castor Dentel was elected to the Orange County School Board for District 6 in August 2017, serving the remaining 2 years of School Board Member Nancy Robbinson's term, and was re-elected to a four-year term on August 18, 2020.

On November 5, 2024, Castor Dentel was elected to serve as Orange County Supervisor of Elections to replace DeSantis appointee Glenn Gilzean. Castor Dentel garnered 40.24% of the vote in a crowded field of other democratic candidates.

== Florida House of Representatives ==
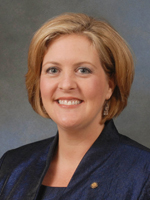
Castor Dentel's legislative portrait

When the state legislative districts were redrawn in 2012, incumbent State Representative Scott Plakon opted to run for re-election in the newly created 30th District so as to avoid a contentious primary with fellow Republican Chris Dorworth, which required him to relocate his family, as he did not live in the 30th District. Castor Dentel opted to run against Plakon, winning the Democratic primary uncontested, and a contentious election ensued. Castor Dentel and Plakon took vastly different positions on a number of issues, including abortion, where Plakon supported legislation that would restrict access to abortion while Castor Dentel opposed any restrictions, and education, where Plakon supported the controversial parent-trigger legislation while Dentel "opposes private-school vouchers and the charter-school legislation." Castor Dentel attacked her opponent as "an extreme social conservative" while emphasizing her support for public schools. The Orlando Sentinel endorsed Castor Dentel over Plakon, criticizing him for putting "too much of his energy into ideological crusades," like his attempts to "put new limits on abortion and decertify labor unions." They praised Castor Dentel for having a "smart platform for creating jobs and reviving Florida's economy that includes strengthening public education, promoting innovation through support for higher education and research, and upgrading Florida's infrastructure, including its ports." In the last few days of the campaign, a political committee supporting Plakon sent out a mailer used a picture of Jerry Sandusky to attack Castor Dentel, claiming that she "would rather protect bad teachers and the union than young and impressionable students," which was condemned by both campaigns. In the end, Castor Dentel was able to defeat Plakon by a surprisingly wide margin, winning 53% of the vote to Plakon's 47%.

During her time in the legislature, Castor Dentel strongly opposed a number of education reforms, including the controversial parent-trigger legislation, which would allow the parents of students attending struggling public schools to petition to create a privately-run charter school. She argued that the bill condemns local school boards and proclaims "outside, for-profit companies as heroes," noting, "It's about misleading the public." Additionally, when Governor Rick Scott made the decision to withdraw the state from the Partnership for Assessment of Readiness for Colleges and Careers, she said that she "welcomed" that decision, but argued that, as Florida made the drawn out transition to the Common Core State Standards Initiative, "We don't have to test that year. We can pause."

While Castor Dentel served on the K-12 Education and the Education Appropriations subcommittees, she was also a member of the Economic Development and Tourism as well as the Business and Professional Regulation subcommittees.

Since her term in the legislature, Castor Dentel has continued her public education advocacy throughout the state of Florida. She served as the Director of Community School Development for The Children's Home Society of Florida and as an Education Policy Advocate for Fund Education Now, Inc.

== Orange County Supervisor of Elections ==
In November 2024, Castor Dental was elected Orange County Supervisor of Elections to replace outgoing Glenn Gilzean, who was appointed by Governor Ron DeSantis after Bill Cowles retired from the position in early 2024.
