= Florida's 34th House of Representatives district =

American legislative district

Florida's 34th State House of Representatives district
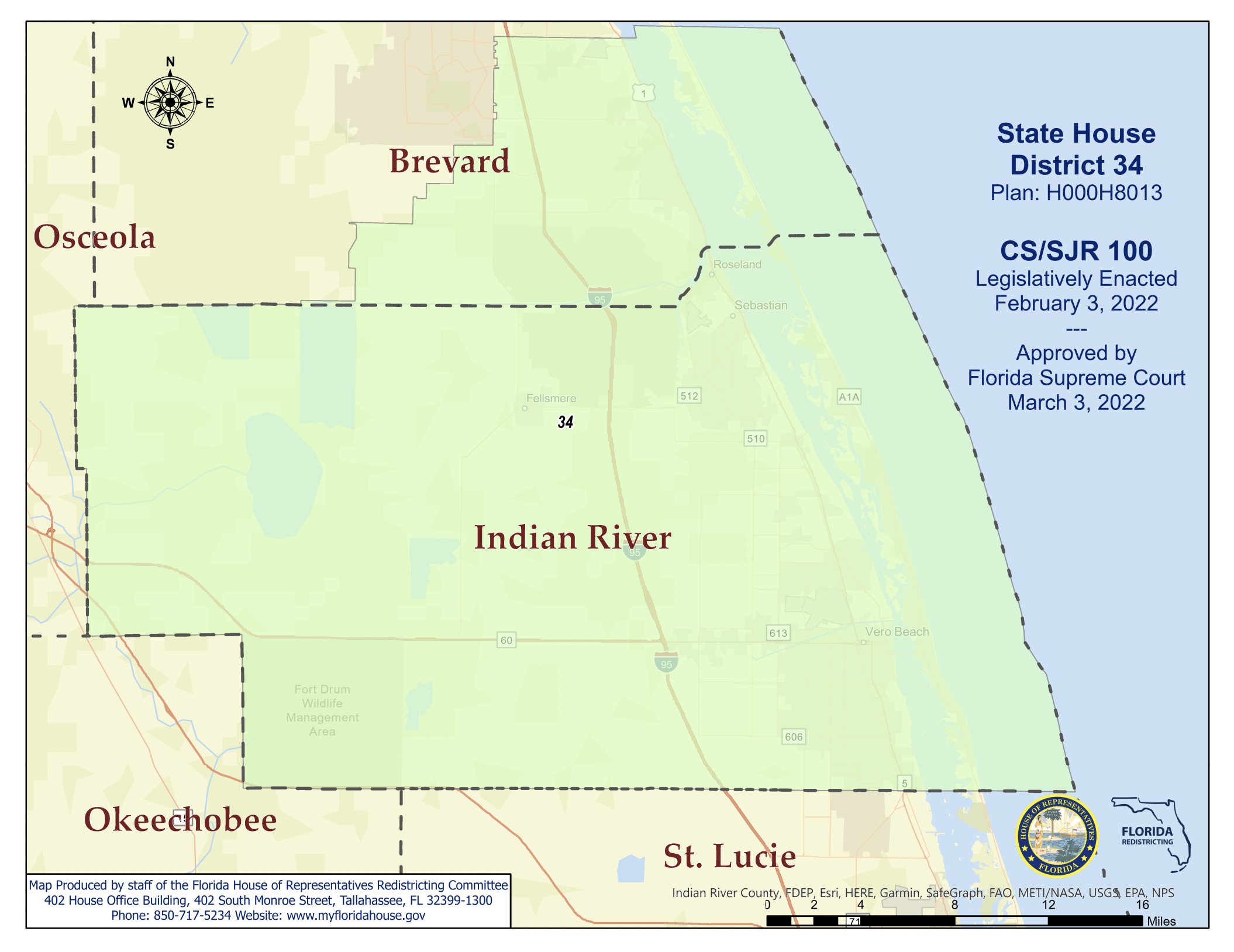
Representative
Robbie Brackett; R–Vero Beach
- Demographics: 93.1% White; 2.8% Black; 5.0% Hispanic; 1.3% Asian; 0.3% Native American; 0.8% Other
- Population (2010): 157,143

Florida's 34th House district elects one member of the Florida House of Representatives. Its current representative since 2022 is Robbie Brackett. The district consists of part of southern Brevard County and all of Indian River County.

== Representatives 1967 - present ==
Representatives	Party	Years of service	Hometown	Notes
Gus Craig	Democratic	1967 - November 7, 1972		district created
Vince Fechtel Jr.	Republican	November 7, 1972 - November 7, 1978		
Bobby Brantley	Republican	November 7, 1978 - November 4, 1986		
Frank Stone	Democratic	November 4, 1986 - November 3, 1992		Changed his party to Democratic in 1991
Bob Starks	Republican	November 3, 1992 - November 7, 2000		
David Mealor	Republican	November 7, 2000 - October 31, 2007		Resigned October 31, 2007
Chris Dorworth	Republican	November 6, 2007 - November 6, 2012		Won special election on November 6, 2007
Jimmie Todd Smith	Republican	November 6, 2012 – November 8, 2016		
Ralph Massullo	Republican	November 8, 2016 – November 8, 2022	Lecanto	
Robbie Brackett	Republican	November 8, 2022 – present	Vero Beach	

== See also ==
- Florida's 10th congressional district
- Florida's 11th congressional district
