= Joe Wright (Kentucky politician) =

American politician (1940–2023)

Majority Leader of the Kentucky Senate
- In office January 5, 1982 – January 1, 1993
- Whip: Helen Garrett; Fred Bradley
- Preceded by: John M. Berry
- Succeeded by: David Karem

Member of the Kentucky Senate from the 5th district
- In office January 1, 1976 – January 1, 1993
- Preceded by: Earl Glenn
- Succeeded by: Virgil Moore

Personal details
- Born: July 29, 1940 Breckinridge County, Kentucky
- Died: July 15, 2023 (aged 82) Louisville, Kentucky
- Party: Democratic
- Education: University of Kentucky

Joseph Richard Wright (July 29, 1940 – July 15, 2023) was a member of the Kentucky Senate from 1976 to 1993 representing the state’s 5th district. From 1982 to 1993 he was the Majority Floor Leader for the Democratic Party.

== Early life ==
Wright graduated from Breckinridge County High School where he was a member of the Future Farmers of America. He then attended the University of Kentucky where he graduated from the College of Agriculture in 1962 with a Bachelor’s Degree in agriculture business. While at Kentucky he was president of the Phi Kappa Tau fraternity chapter, a member of the freshmen basketball team, a member of Block and Bridle, and a member of the livestock judging team. After graduating, he returned to his home in Harned, Kentucky and became a small farmer. As a young man he was also a member of the United States Marine Corps Reserve.

== Political career ==
=== Kentucky Senate ===
Wright was first sworn in to the Kentucky Senate in 1976 and first served on the Agricultural and Education committees. In the 1975 elections he defeated incumbent Earl Glenn in a three-way primary race and then defeated Bill Crowell in the general election. At the time, the district comprised precincts in Breckinridge, Grayson, Hardin, Hart, Meade, and Ohio counties.

In 1978, Wright joined a group of Democratic senators, led by John M. Berry, in a push for legislative independence from the executive branch. This was a direct challenge to their party’s leadership. Berry and Wright were joined by senators Tom Easterly, Lowell Hughes, David Karem, Danny Meyer, Mike Moloney, and Ed O'Daniel. The group called themselves the Blacksheep Squadron and was joined by the Senate’s eight Republicans. They demanded that the legislature be open, transparent, accountable and, above all, independent (that bills be heard regardless of the governor’s opinion). Their movement was unsuccessful until the election of John Y. Brown Jr. as governor in 1979. Brown was a businessman with no political experience who had no desire to run the legislature.

In 1979 he defeated Republican Jim Allen in the general election after not facing a challenger in the primaries.

In 1981, Wright was elected party floor leader and would spend the next eleven years in that position. During this time he served on the Small Business committee and became chairman of the Agriculture committee. He was also able to provide funding for the University of Kentucky to purchase the Pin Oak Farm in Woodford County which became UK’s research farm and the addition of several buildings to the Future Farmers of America camp in Hardinsburg.

In 1983 he defeated Bob Chambliss in the primary election and Mel Mangan in the general election. In 1988, he ran unopposed in both the primary and general elections.

=== 1996 Kentucky's 2nd congressional district election ===
Wright retired from the senate in 1992 with the intent on leaving politics. However, with the death of William H. Natcher and the election of Republican Ron Lewis in 1994 he was urged to run for the congressional seat.

Wright’s campaign was hampered by President Bill Clinton’s stance on tobacco. Tobacco was a major cash crop in the district, which made Clinton and the national Democratic party unpopular. Wright campaigned across the district at tobacco warehouses and fields. Lewis even said, "My opponent's biggest problem is his party's stand on tobacco."

Wright lost the election to Lewis with a vote total of 125,433 to 90,483.

=== Other public posts ===
Wright would later serve as Chairman of the Breckinridge County School Board. In 2012, he was appointed by Governor Steve Beshear to the Kentucky Tax Reform Commission. He was also chairman of the Meade County Riverport Authority, a member of the Kentucky State Fair Board, and the Kentucky Council for Agricultural Research, Extension and Teaching.

== Non-political activity ==
=== Business ===
Wright, alongside his brother Ben, was the co-owner of a John Deere tractor dealership that has four locations in Kentucky (Hardinsburg, Owensboro, Bowling Green, and Glasgow) and three in Indiana (Corydon, Seymour, and Orleans). He owned one of the largest farms in Breckinridge County, and the state. He was a former co-owner of WXBC (FM) radio station in Hardinsburg.

=== Agricultural ===
He served on the board of directors of the Burley Tobacco Growers Cooperative from 1983 to 1995 and was president in 1995. He was also a founding member of the Kentucky Future Farmers of America Foundation Board and served on the board for twelve years.

=== Honors ===
- Kentucky Farm Bureau Distinguished Service Award
- Thomas Poe Cooper Distinguished Farm Leadership Award
- UK Agriculture Alumni Association’s Distinguished Alumni Award
- Kentucky Rural Electrical Cooperatives’ Distinguished Rural Kentuckian
