= Selph =

Selph is a surname. Notable people with the surname include:

- Carey Selph (1901–1976), American baseball player
- Carl Selph (born 1946), American politician
- Jimmie Selph (1915–2000), American country music artist
- Robert Selph Henry (1889–1970), American lawyer, railroad executive and historian
