= Frank Stone (Florida politician) =

American politician

Member of the Florida House of Representatives from the 34th district
- In office 1986–1992
- Preceded by: Carl Selph
- Succeeded by: Bob Starks (redistricted)

Personal details
- Party: Republican; Democratic

Frank Stone is an American politician. He served as a member for the 34th district of the Florida House of Representatives.
