= Webster Barnaby =

American politician (born 1959)

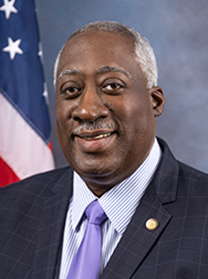

Member of the Florida House of Representatives from the 29th district
- Incumbent
- Assumed office November 3, 2020
- Preceded by: David Santiago

Personal details
- Born: December 9, 1959 (age 66) Birmingham, England
- Party: Republican
- Spouse: Silvia
- Children: 2
- Education: Birmingham Metropolitan College (AA)

Webster Barnaby (born December 9, 1959) is a British–American politician who has served as the State Representative for Florida's 29th district since 2022. Prior to redistricting, he served in the 27th district from 2020 to 2022. He is a member of the Republican Party.

== Early life and education ==
Barnaby was born in Birmingham, England, to parents from Jamaica. He earned an associate degree in business from Birmingham Metropolitan College. In 1991, at the age of 31, Barnaby immigrated to the United States, relocating to Florida, where he established residency in Deltona.

== Career ==
After working in the hospitality industry in the United States Virgin Islands, Barnaby moved to Deltona, Florida in 1991. From 1994 to 2010, Barnaby worked as a district manager for National Write Your Congressman. He later served on the Deltona City Council from 2012 to 2020. A pastor, he has said opening prayers for several Donald Trump rallies. Barnaby was elected to the Florida House of Representatives in November 2020.

In March 2022, the Florida Supreme Court approved new legislative maps drawn by the state Legislature, which redrew the maps for many Florida districts. Because of this, Barnaby ran for and won District 29 on November 8, 2022..

During an April 2023 debate on a bathroom bill, Barnaby referred to transgender people as "demons and imps" pretending to be part of this world, after comparing them to the mutants of the X-Men franchise. He later apologized.

== Personal life ==
Barnaby became a naturalized American citizen in 1998. He and his wife, Silvia, have two children.
