= Jimmie Todd Smith =

American politician

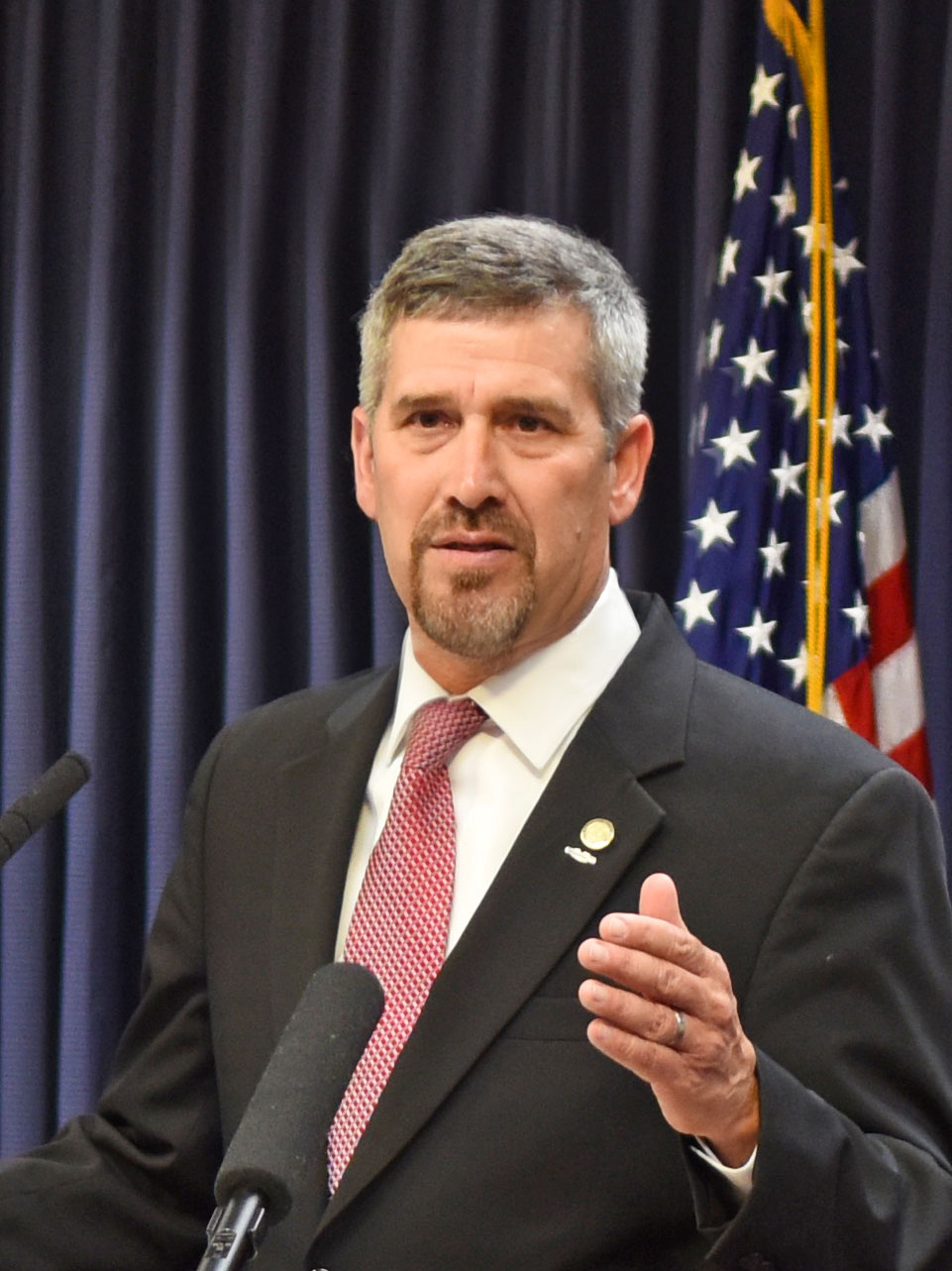

Member of the Florida House of Representatives
- In office November 2, 2010 – November 8, 2016
- Preceded by: Ron Schultz
- Succeeded by: Ralph Massullo
- Constituency: 43rd district (2010–2012); 34th district (2012–2016)

Personal details
- Born: October 12, 1965 (age 60) Ridgewood, New Jersey, U.S.
- Party: Republican
- Spouse: Victoria
- Children: Ashton; Gabriella
- Profession: United States Army, security guard

Jimmie Todd Smith (born October 12, 1965) is an American politician. he is a former member of the Florida House of Representatives for the 34th District, which includes Citrus County and northern Hernando County, elected in 2012. He also was a House member representing the 43rd District from 2010 to 2012. His last office was as a member of the Citrus County Board of Commissioners, starting in 2016, until losing renomination in a separate district. He is a Republican and U.S. Army veteran.

== History ==
Smith was born in Ridgewood, New Jersey. He is one of 15 children and moved with his family to Florida in 1975. He joined the United States Army and served from 1983 until 2003 in the 101st Airborne and 82nd Airborne Division. He retired as a staff sergeant. Smith was deployed to South Korea, Panama, and in Saudi Arabia (where he served during Operation Desert Storm). After serving in Panama once more, Smith was stationed at Fort Bragg in North Carolina, before being relocated to Fort Benning in Georgia, where he retired. He moved to Citrus County where he worked as a security guard for the Crystal River Nuclear Power Plant.

Smith is married with children and grandchildren.

== Florida House of Representatives ==
In 2010, Smith ran for the Florida House of Representatives in the Republican primary against incumbent State Representative Ron Schultz. He narrowly defeated Schultz by 399 votes, with 51% of the vote. Smith was unopposed in the general election.

When Florida House districts were redrawn in 2012, Smith ran for re-election in the newly created 34th District. He was opposed by former State Senator and Public Service Commissioner Nancy Argenziano, who ran as an independent candidate after serving as a Republican in the legislature. Lynn Dostal, a teacher, won the Democratic primary, but dropped out in favor of Argenziano, who received support from the Florida Democratic Party. Argenziano was endorsed over Smith by the Tampa Bay Times, which criticized Smith for offering "few substantive ideas," noting that "his most notable achievement is pushing a law that requires random drug testing of state employees, which is tied up in court." Smith defeated Argenziano, receiving 58% of the vote. In 2014, Smith was re-elected to the legislature without opposition, winning his third term entirely uncontested.

While serving in the legislature, Smith sponsored legislation that "would make it easier for Florida cattle ranchers and other owners of private property adjacent to state-owned land to exchange public parcels of equal value in return for conservation easements," which drew criticism from environmentalists. Additionally, he authored a bill that would "block welfare recipients from using their electronic benefit cards at places like casinos, bottle clubs, bingo facilities and strip clubs," declaring, "I don't want you to get a lap dance on my dollar."
