= Bruce McEwan =

American politician (1937–2017)

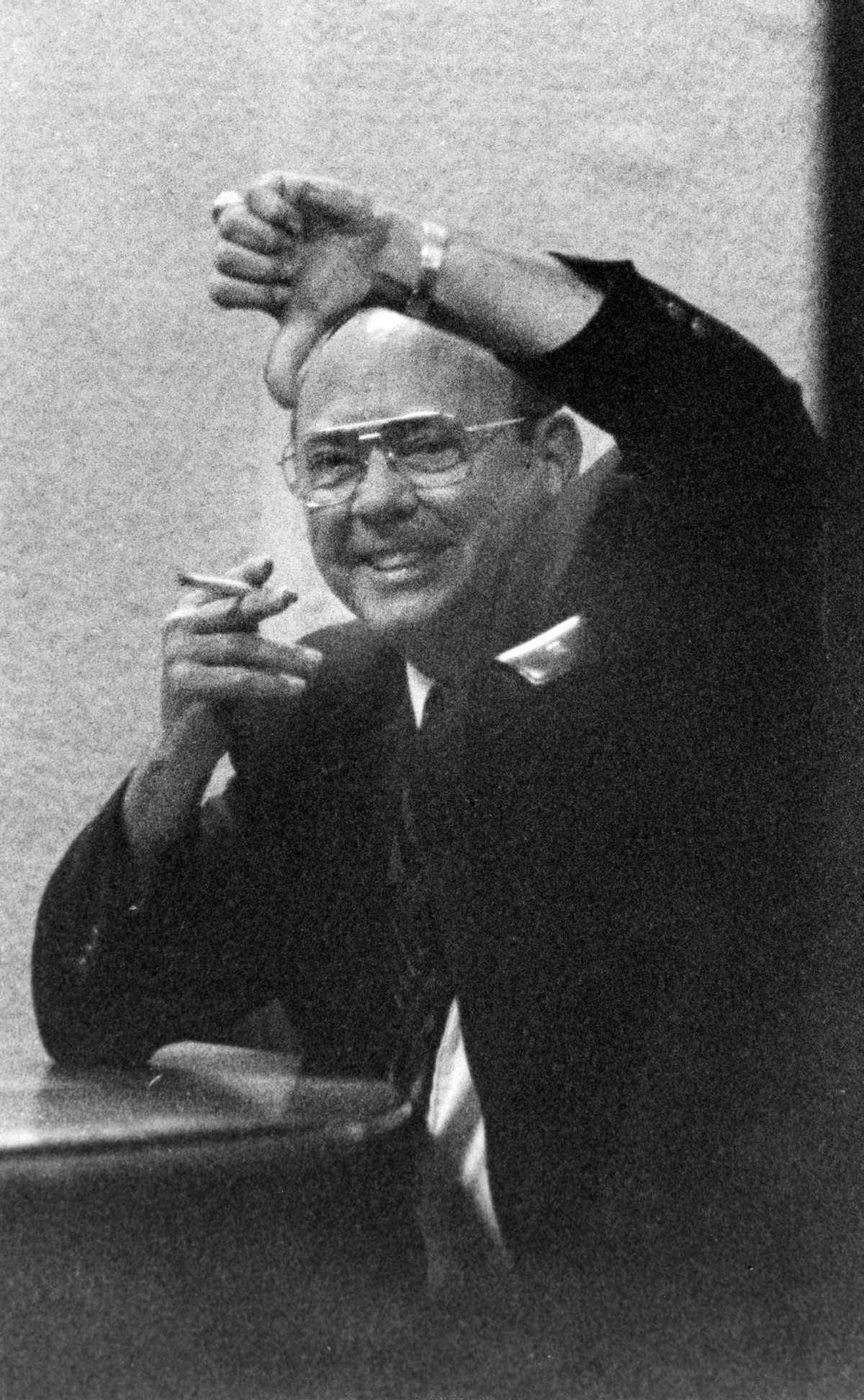
- McEwan in 1991

Member of the Florida House of Representatives from the 38th district
- In office November 4, 1980 – November 3, 1992
- Preceded by: Larry Kirkwood
- Succeeded by: Bob Sindler (redistricted)

Personal details
- Born: March 19, 1937 Orlando, Florida, U.S.
- Died: November 23, 2017 (aged 80)
- Party: Republican
- Education: Rollins College; University of Florida College of Law

Bruce McEwan (March 19, 1937 – November 23, 2017) was an American politician. He served as a Republican member for the 38th district of the Florida House of Representatives.

== Life and career ==
McEwan was born in Orlando, Florida. He attended Rollins College and the University of Florida College of Law.

McEwan served in the Florida House of Representatives from 1980 to 1992. He lost his seat in 1992, after he was defeated in re-election by Democrat Kim Shepard.

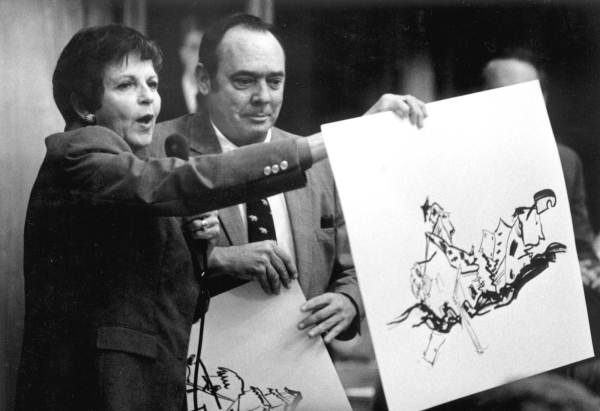
McEwan (right) with Betty Easley, 1986

McEwan died on November 23, 2017, at the age of 80.
