= Mike Clelland =

American politician

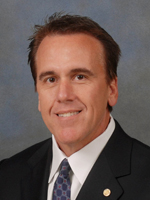
- Official portrait, 2012

Member of the Florida House of Representatives from the 29th district
- In office November 20, 2012 – November 18, 2014
- Preceded by: Tom Goodson
- Succeeded by: Scott Plakon

Personal details
- Born: December 18, 1963 (age 62) Washington, D.C.
- Party: Democratic
- Spouse: Christy Clelland
- Children: Emma, Patrick
- Education: Seminole Community College (A.A.); University of Central Florida (B.A.); Florida A&M University College of Law (J.D.)
- Profession: Firefighter, attorney

Michael Philip Clelland (born December 18, 1963) is a Democratic member of the Florida House of Representatives. From 2012 to 2014, he represented the 29th District, which consists of western Seminole County, until his defeat by Scott Plakon.

== History ==
Clelland moved to Florida in 1974 and began working for the Longwood Fire Department, later attending Seminole Community College, where he graduated with an Associate degree in fire science technology in 1994. He then attended the University of Central Florida, graduating with a degree in political science, and then the Florida A&M University College of Law, graduating with a Juris Doctor.

== Florida House of Representatives ==
In 2012, when the Florida House of Representatives districts were redrawn, Clelland ran in the 29th District, which incumbent State Representative Chris Dorworth, a Republican, was also running in. The Orlando Sentinel endorsed Clelland, praising him as "smart" and calling his legislative priorities "especially welcome." Though Dorworth was widely expected to cruise to re-election, Clelland appeared to defeat him on election night by 123 votes, prompting a manual recount, which increased Clelland's lead to 146 votes. Not long afterwards, Dorworth conceded and Clelland was sworn in.

== Legal career ==
Clelland joined personal injury law firm Morgan & Morgan in July 2014.
