= Bob Cortes =

Republican politician

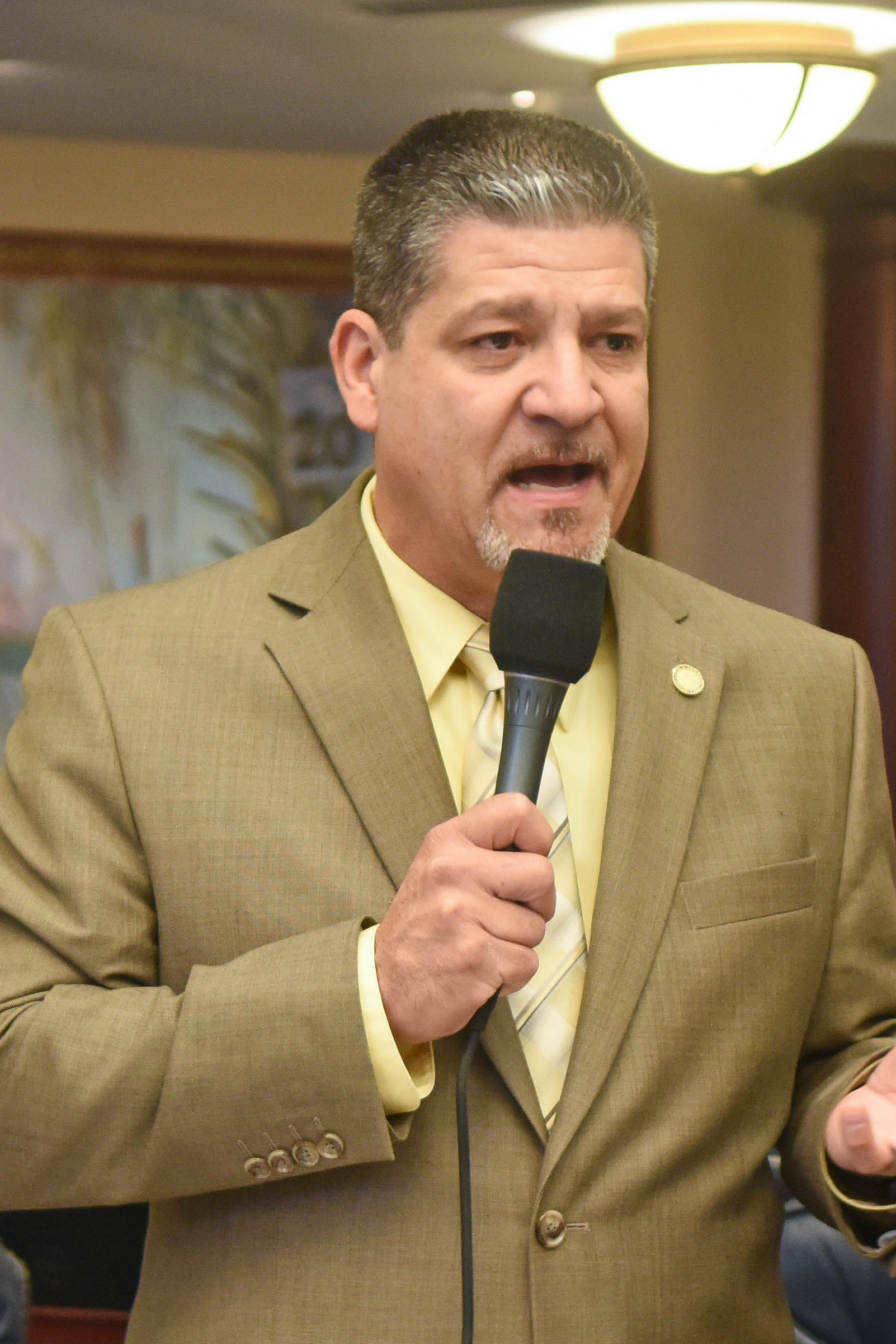

Member of the Florida House of Representatives from the 30th district
- In office November 4, 2014 – November 6, 2018
- Preceded by: Karen Castor Dentel
- Succeeded by: Joy Goff-Marcil

Personal details
- Born: September 18, 1963 (age 62) New York City, New York
- Party: Republican
- Spouse: Virginia
- Children: Robert, Jr., Kylee, Randy
- Profession: Small business owner

Robert Cortes (born September 18, 1963) is a Republican politician who served as a member of the Florida House of Representatives from 2014 to 2018, representing the 30th District, which includes Altamonte Springs, Casselberry, Maitland, and Winter Park in southern Seminole County and northern Orange County.

== History ==
Cortes was born in Brooklyn in New York City to Puerto Rican parents, and lived in Puerto Rico starting at the age of 10. He later attended the EDP College of Puerto Rico before moving to Longwood, Florida, where he founded two businesses, Cortes Towing Service and Cortrans Shuttle Service. In 2009, Cortes ran for a seat on the Longwood City Commission in District 3, and defeated Mike Holt with 61% of the vote. He was re-elected to the City Commission in 2012 over Ben Paris with 59% of the vote, and in 2014 was elected by the City Commission to serve as the Mayor.

== Florida House of Representatives ==
In 2014, incumbent State Representative Karen Castor Dentel, a Democrat, ran for re-election in the 30th District, so Cortes ran against her. He faced Seminole County Soil and Water Conservation District Supervisor Scott Sturgill in the Republican primary, and he campaigned on reducing taxes and regulations for businesses, on his support for charter schools, and on his plan to provide parents homeschooling their children with funding to do so. The Orlando Sentinel, though criticizing both Cortes and Sturgill as candidates who "largely walk in lock step on most GOP stances," endorsed Cortes, praising the "strength of his municipal experience" overseeing Longwood's twenty million dollar budget. In the end, Cortes ended up winning the primary by a wide margin, defeating Sturgill with 57% of the vote. He advanced to the general election, where he faced Castor Dentel, and a contentious campaign ensued. Cortes attacked Castor Dentel for her focus on public education, saying, "Pretty much all the bills she's put forward have been geared towards education. Not that there's anything particularly wrong with that, but...other issues affect our district and our state." He campaigned on his support for lower taxes and regulations, though he defended his vote in favor of increasing property taxes while on the City Commission. During the campaign, Cortes was attacked for not actually living inside the district while he was campaigning, as Longwood, where he was elected to the City Commission, was in the neighboring 29th District, and as a result, he ended up resigning his City Commission seat and moved into Altamonte Springs. Groups supporting Cortes attacked Castor Dentel for allegedly voting to defund public education, based on the fact that she voted against the state's budget, an attack that Orlando Sentinel columnist Scott Maxwell called "slimy." During the campaign, the Orlando Sentinel endorsed Castor Dentel over Cortes, noting that while Cortes is "sincere and civic-minded," he was "not in Castor Dentel's league." Ultimately, Cortes defeated Castor Dentel, winning 51 percent of the vote to her 49 percent. In 2016, Cortes voted to allow fracking in Florida.

Cortes was defeated in his bid for re-election in 2018, losing to Democrat Joy Goff-Marcil.

== See also ==
- Florida House of Representatives
