= Bobby Brantley =

American politician (born 1948)

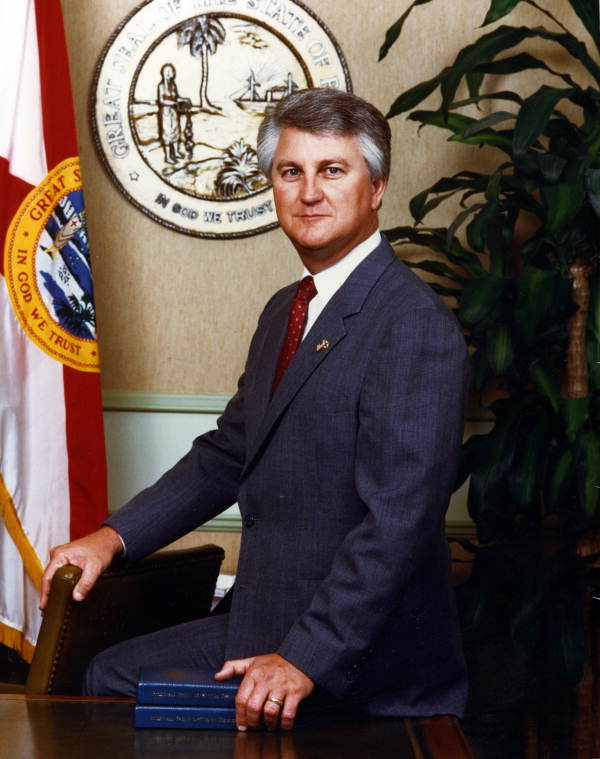

13th Lieutenant Governor of Florida
- In office January 6, 1987 – January 8, 1991
- Governor: Bob Martinez
- Preceded by: Wayne Mixson
- Succeeded by: Buddy MacKay

30th Chair of the National Lieutenant Governors Association
- In office 1989–1990
- Preceded by: Steve McAlpine
- Succeeded by: Jim Folsom Jr.

Member of the Florida House of Representatives
- In office November 7, 1978 – November 4, 1986
- Preceded by: Vince Fechtel, Jr.
- Succeeded by: Stan Bainter
- Constituency: 34th district (1978—1982); 27th district (1982—1986)

Personal details
- Born: April 6, 1948 (age 78) Atmore, Alabama
- Party: Republican

Bobby Lynn Brantley (born April 6, 1948) is an American Republican politician from the State of Florida. He served as the 13th lieutenant governor of Florida, from 1987 to 1991.

Brantley began his political career in 1978 when he was elected to the Florida House of Representatives from a district based in Seminole and Lake Counties. He was reelected three times and represented parts of Central Florida in the House until in 1986.

In 1986, he won the Republican nomination for lieutenant governor, defeating Marilyn Evans-Jones, Betty Easley, and Tom Bush to become the running-mate for Tampa Mayor Bob Martinez, the Republican nominee for governor. In the general election, Martinez and Brantley defeated the Democratic ticket, consisting of State Rep. Steve Pajcic for governor and State Sen. Frank Mann for lieutenant governor, by 54.56 to 45.44%.

Brantley did not seek reelection in 1990, and retired from political office in 1991. As of 2011 he is a consultant and lobbyist at one of Florida's oldest law firms, Shutts & Bowen.

Party political offices
Preceded by Leo Callahan	Republican nominee for Lieutenant Governor of Florida; 1986	Succeeded by J. Allison DeFoor
Florida House of Representatives
Preceded by Vince Fechtel Jr.	Member of the Florida House of Representatives from the 34th district 1978–1982	Succeeded by Carl Selph
Preceded by Jon L. Mills	Member of the Florida House of Representatives from the 27th district 1982–1986	Succeeded by Stanley Bainter
Political offices
Preceded by Wayne Mixson	Lieutenant Governor of Florida; 1987–1991	Succeeded by Buddy MacKay
