= Chase Tramont =

American politician (born 1979)

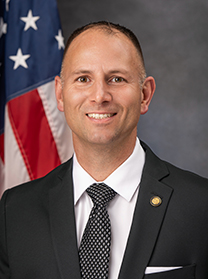

Member of the Florida House of Representatives from the 30th district
- Incumbent
- Assumed office November 8, 2022
- Preceded by: Joy Goff-Marcil

Member of the Port Orange City Council
- In office 2016–2022
- Preceded by: Don Burnette
- Succeeded by: Kat Atwood

Personal details
- Born: Justin Chase Tramont; November 9, 1979 (age 46) Daytona Beach, Florida, U.S.
- Party: Republican
- Children: 4
- Education: Flagler College (BA); Kennesaw State University (BA)
- Occupation: Politician; educator; preacher

Justin Chase Tramont (born November 9, 1979) is an American politician. He is serving as a member of the Florida House of Representatives for the 30th district since November 8, 2022. He previously served as a member of the Port Orange city council from 2016 to 2022.

== Early life and education ==
Justin Chase Tramont was born on November 9, 1979, in Daytona Beach, Florida, to Sharon and Bruce Tramont. His father was a history teacher and his mother was an English teacher at Mainland High School. Tramont was raised in Daytona Beach and was a member of the First Baptist Church there. He attended Spruce Creek High School until his junior year. He then played as a point guard for the Mainland High School basketball team and led the Class 5A team to a state title in his senior year. He received two undergraduate degrees, the first in communications in 2002 from Flagler College and another in education in 2007 at Kennesaw State University.

== Career ==
Tramont taught history at Spruce Creek High School. In 2016, Tramont was elected to the Port Orange city council. He was re-elected in 2018. After withdrawing from a Volusia County council race in 2022, Tramont resigned to run for the Florida House of Representatives. As of August 2022, Tramont stopped teaching and worked as a marketing manager and Baptist preacher. He was elected to the Florida House in November 2022. He was re-elected in 2024 wth 66% of the vote.

In 2023, Tramont sponsored FL HB 391, a bill to create a registered welfare system for parents of "medically fragile children". He also voted in favor of a bill to restrict the way students can use preferred pronouns in school. In 2024, Tramont voted for a six-week abortion ban.

Tramont briefly considered running for Congress in the 2025 Florida 6th congressional district special election, a seat outside the boundaries of his state legislative district, before President-elect Donald Trump endorsed state senator Randy Fine.

== Political views ==
Tramont does not support the separation of church and state, stating: "the separation of church and state doesn't exist anywhere in our Constitution". In 2022, he advocated for clean water initiatives in Florida.

Tramont endorsed and supported Governor Ron DeSantis in the 2024 Republican Party presidential primaries.

== Personal life ==
Tramont is married to his wife Staci. They live in Port Orange, Florida and have four children. In August 2020, Tramont was hospitalized for COVID-19.
