= Gerta Bendl =

American politician

Member of the Kentucky House of Representatives from the 34th district
- In office January 1, 1976 – June 25, 1987
- Preceded by: David Karem
- Succeeded by: Jack Will

Personal details
- Born: Gerta Koperek; July 5, 1931
- Died: June 25, 1987 (aged 55)

Gertrude Bendl (née Koperek; July 5, 1931 – June 25, 1987) was a Kentucky community activist and legislator who served in the Kentucky House of Representatives from 1976 until her death in 1987. She was the first woman to chair the Health and Welfare Committee. Her legislation involved "establishing a 'children's survival bill;' creating boarding-home regulations and bills of rights for nursing home residents and persons with developmental disabilities; mandating health insurance coverage for mentally ill; and providing for a living will." She was described as a "leading force" and "force of nature".

== Early life and activism ==
Bendl (then Gerta Koperek) was born to Mary and Paul Koperek, second-generation German and Polish immigrants, on July 5, 1931. She was the youngest of three children and grew up in New Kensington, Pennsylvania, but attended a Catholic school for girls in Coraopolis, Pennsylvania, for a year, before graduating from a New Kensington public school in 1949. She attended but did not graduate from the Pennsylvania College for Women (now Chatham University), but continued to study music privately and performed in opera, in concerts, and on showboats. In 1953, she married Richard Bendl; they had three children. Gerta Bendl founded Apple Hill Playhouse as a young mother. The Bendls moved to Atlanta, Georgia, in 1962, before settling in Louisville, Kentucky, in 1967.

Within two years in 1969, Gerta Bendl organized her fellow housewives as the Dames of Dundee to protest school boundary lines; though there was a "highly regarded public high school four blocks from her home," odd boundaries meant their children had to attend a school several miles away. After their first success, the Dames focused on another community problem of frequent flooding; in 1970, Bendl was a major force in creating the community's Water Management Committee.

== Politics and death ==
In 1971, Bendl won the Democratic nomination to run as a Louisville alderman and was elected by her district as one of few women aldermen ever elected in the city. She continued to organize her grassroots volunteer force, advocated for charitable causes, continued to work on water drainage issues, and was known for her stylish hats.

In 1975, Bendl was first elected to the house after incumbent David Karem retired to run for the Kentucky Senate. In the 34th district in the Kentucky General Assembly, she would push for legislation regulating nursing homes and fighting domestic violence. For the former subject, her sponsored bills included HB 106, the Nursing Home Reform Bill, and several others. For the latter, she overwhelmingly passed her 1980 bill on warrantless arrests for domestic violence despite strong opposition and debate, including a clash where she shouted into her microphone out of turn. She served until her death of a heart attack in 1987.
