= Florida's 29th House of Representatives district =

American legislative district

Florida's 29th State House of Representatives district
Representative
Webster Barnaby; R–Deltona

Florida's 29th House of Representatives district elects one member of the Florida House of Representatives. It covers parts of Volusia County.

== Members ==
- Scott Plakon (2014–2022)
- Webster Barnaby (since 2020)
