= Mack Walters =

American politician

Member of the Kentucky Senate from the 20th district
- In office 1970–1973
- Preceded by: Lawrence Wetherby
- Succeeded by: Tom Easterly

Personal details
- Born: December 18, 1916 Simpsonville, Kentucky, U.S.
- Died: May 11, 1973 (aged 56)
- Party: Democratic
- Education: The Citadel

Mack G. Walters (December 18, 1916 – May 11, 1973) was an American politician. He served as a Democratic member for the 20th district of the Kentucky Senate.

== Life and career ==
Walters was born in Simpsonville, Kentucky. He attended Simpsonville High School and The Citadel.

Walters served in the Kentucky Senate from 1970 to 1973. On June 15, 1972, Walters was one of 20 Democratic senators that voted for Kentucky to ratify the Equal Rights Amendment.

Walters died on May 11, 1973, at the age of 56.
