= Robbie Brackett =

American politician from Florida

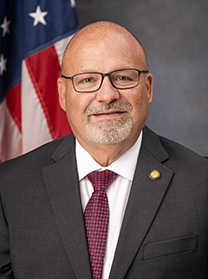

Member of the Florida House of Representatives from the 34th district
- Incumbent
- Assumed office November 8, 2022
- Preceded by: Erin Grall

Personal details
- Born: April 9, 1963 (age 63) Vero Beach, Florida, U.S.
- Party: Republican
- Spouse: Samantha Brackett
- Children: 3
- Education: Lipscomb University (BS)

Robert "Robbie" Brackett is a Republican member of the Florida Legislature representing the state's 34th House district, which includes Indian River County and some of Brevard County. Brackett previously served as the mayor of Vero Beach.
