= Mary Lou Marzian =

American politician (born 1954)

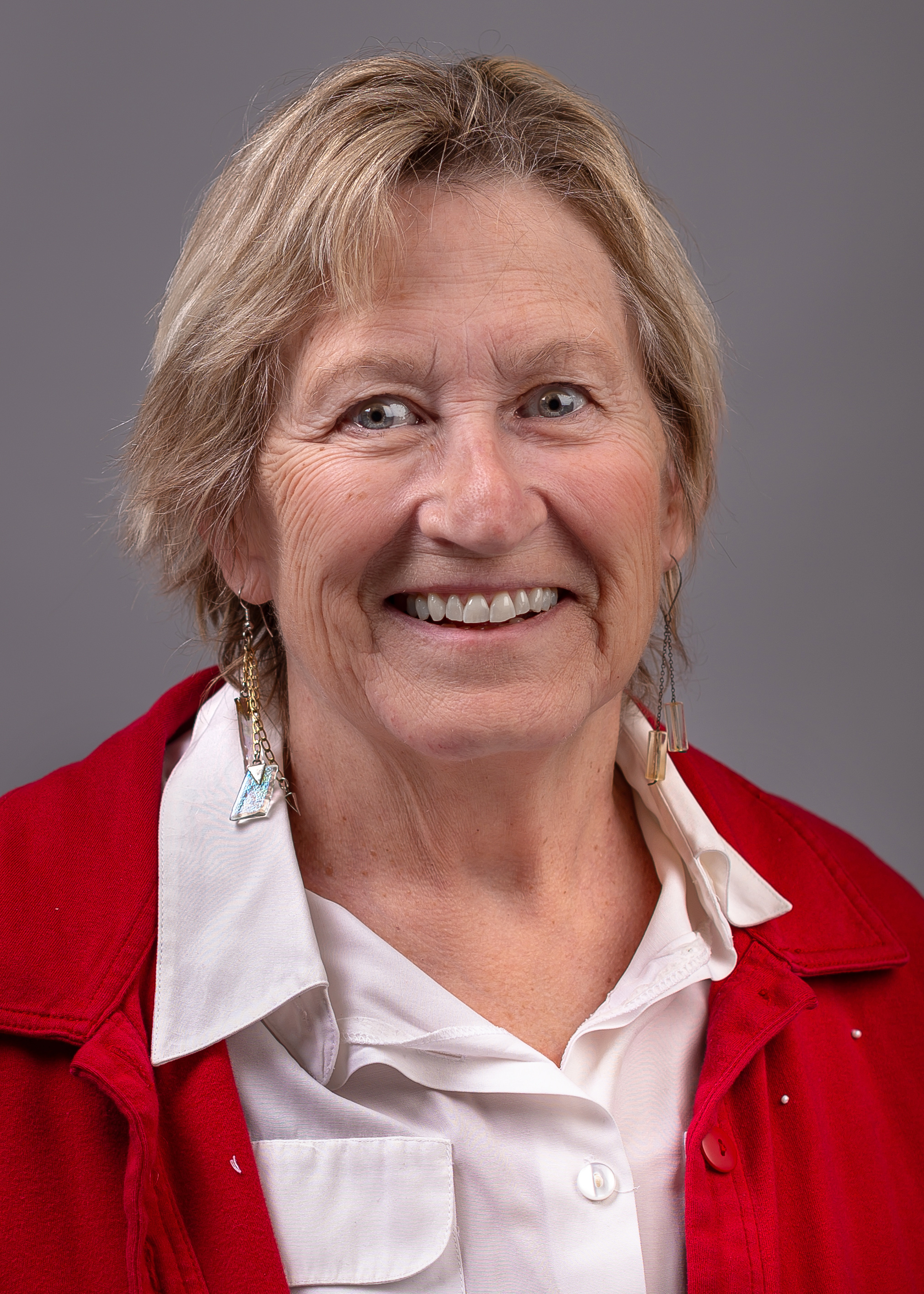

Member of the Kentucky House of Representatives
- Incumbent
- Assumed office January 1, 2025
- Preceded by: Josie Raymond
- Constituency: 41st district
- In office January 13, 1994 – January 1, 2023
- Preceded by: Mike Ward
- Succeeded by: Sarah Stalker
- Constituency: 34th district

Personal details
- Born: September 16, 1954 (age 72) Louisville, Kentucky
- Party: Democratic
- Education: Jefferson Community College; University of Louisville
- Profession: Registered nurse

Mary Lou Marzian (born September 16, 1954) is an American politician and a Democratic member of the Kentucky House of Representatives, representing district 41 since January 2025. She previously represented district 34 from 1994 to 2023. Marzian was first elected in a January 1994 special election following the resignation of incumbent Mike Ward. She retired from the house in 2022 after being redistricted into the 41st district with Josie Raymond. She ran again for the house in 2024, winning the 41st district.

== Education ==
Marzian earned her associate degree from Jefferson Community College (now Jefferson Community and Technical College) and her BSN from the University of Louisville.

== Elections ==
- 1994 Marzian won the 1994 Democratic Primary and won the November 8, 1994 General election against Republican nominee John Brasch.
- 1996 Marzian was unopposed for the 1996 Democratic Primary and won the November 5, 1996 General election against Republican nominee Charles Billips.
- 1998 Marzian was challenged in the 1998 Democratic Primary, but won, and won the November 3, 1998 General election against Republican nominee Todd Lally.
- 2000 Marzian was unopposed for both the 2000 Democratic Primary and the November 7, 2000 General election, winning with 13,867 votes.
- 2002 Marzian was unopposed for the 2002 Democratic Primary and won the November 5, 2002 General election with 12,885 votes (66.5%) against Republican nominee Philip Kimball.
- 2004 Marzian and returning 2002 Republican challenger Philip Kimball both won their 2004 primaries, setting up a rematch; Marzian won the November 2, 2004 General election with 16,383 votes (66.1%) against Kimball.
- 2006 Marzian was unopposed for both the 2006 Democratic Primary and the November 7, 2006 General election, winning with 14,988 votes.
- 2008 Marzian was unopposed for the 2008 Democratic Primary and won the November 4, 2008 General election with 16,920 votes (69.8%) against Republican nominee Michael Pitzer.
- 2010 Marzian was unopposed for both the May 18, 2010 Democratic Primary and the November 2, 2010 General election, winning with 14,559 votes.
- 2012 Marzian was unopposed for both the May 22, 2012 Democratic Primary and the November 6, 2012 General election, winning with 17,360 votes.
- 2016 Marzian was unopposed for both the May 17, 2016 Democratic Primary and the November 8, 2016 General election, winning with 19,596 votes.
