= Joy Goff-Marcil =

American politician from Florida

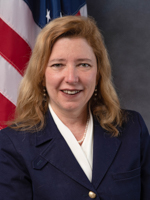

Member of the Florida House of Representatives from the 30th district
- In office November 6, 2018 – November 8, 2022
- Preceded by: Bob Cortes
- Succeeded by: Chase Tramont

Personal details
- Born: June 23, 1968 (age 58) Orlando, Florida
- Party: Democratic

Joy Mintie Goff-Marcil (born June 23, 1968) is an American politician who served as a member of the Florida House of Representatives for the 30th district from 2018 to 2022.

== Career ==
Goff-Marcil was elected in the general election on November 6, 2018, winning 53 percent of the vote over 47 percent of Republican candidate Bob Cortes. Previously, she served for six years on the Maitland City Council.
