= Sheri McInvale =

American politician (born 1955)

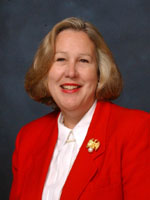

Member of the Florida House of Representatives from the 36th district
- In office November 5, 2002 – November 7, 2006
- Preceded by: Allen Trovillion
- Succeeded by: Scott Randolph

Personal details
- Born: May 6, 1955 (age 71) St. Petersburg, Florida
- Party: Republican (until 1998, 2006–present); Democratic (1998–2006)
- Children: 3
- Education: Auburn University (B.A.)
- Occupation: Public relations

Sheri McInvale (born May 6, 1955) is an American politician from Florida who served as a member of the Florida House of Representatives from the 36th district from 2002 to 2006. She was initially elected as a Democrat, but switched to the Republican Party in 2006.

== Early life ==
McInvale was born in St. Petersburg, Florida, in 1955, and attended Auburn University, graduating in 1977 with her bachelor's degree in communications. After graduating, she worked in banking before raising her children. After getting divorced, she worked in the business development office of a law firm and later in public relations for a senior advocacy group.

== Florida House of Representatives ==
In 2002, Republican State Representative Allen Trovillion was term-limited and unable to seek a fifth term. McInvale, who had recently switched to the Democratic Party, ran to succeed him, and won his endorsement. She faced attorney Ali Kirk in the Democratic primary, and won the nomination by a wide margin, receiving 65 percent of the vote to Kirk's 35 percent. In the general election, she ran against the Republican nominee, attorney Patrick Howell, one of the party's few openly gay candidates. McInvale ultimately won, receiving 50 percent of the vote to Howell's 42 percent and Libertarian John F. Kennedy's 8 percent.

McInvale ran for re-election in 2004, and was challenged in the Democratic primary by Marni Berger, the vice-chair of the Orange County Democratic Party. Berger argued that McInvale's time in the legislature showed "a conservative Republican voting record," pointing to her support for a constitutional amendment requiring parental notification before minors could receive abortion and the creation of a specialty license plate supporting "family values." McInvale campaigned as a "bi-partisan consensus builder" and a moderate, and responded to Berger by stating, "You want to say you're more liberal than me? Fine, go ahead." During the campaign, the county Democratic Party supported Berger with a $15,000 check, which McInvale said made her feel "a real sense of betrayal." McInvale only narrowly won renomination, defeating Berger by just 50 votes. No other candidates filed for the election, and McInvale was re-elected unopposed in the general election.

In 2006, McInvale faced several opponents in the Democratic primary, and the Florida Democratic Party pledged its support for her and other incumbents in the election. However, on January 10, 2006, McInvale announced that she would switch to the Republican Party at a news conference attended by Lieutenant Governor Toni Jennings. Responding to reports that her switch was motivated by discontent with the local party's support of Berger's primary challenge in 2004, McInvale said, "There is nothing about the past that brings us here today. . . . This is more about geography. I get to go from the back row up to one of the front rows." In running for re-election, she faced Scott Randolph, an environmental attorney and the Democratic nominee. Randolph defeated McInvale by a wide margin, receiving 61 percent of the vote to her 39 percent.
