= Allen Trovillion =

American politician (1926–2020)

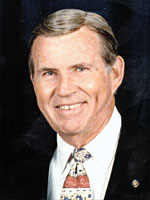

Member of the Florida House of Representatives from the 36th district
- In office November 8, 1994 – November 5, 2002
- Preceded by: Kim Shepard
- Succeeded by: Sheri McInvale

Personal details
- Born: May 1, 1926 Winter Park, Florida, U.S.
- Died: December 8, 2020 (aged 94)
- Party: Republican
- Education: University of Florida (BS)

Military service
- Branch/service: United States Army
- Battles/wars: World War II

Allen Trovillion (May 1, 1926 – December 8, 2020) was an American politician who served as a member of the Florida House of Representatives from the 36th district.

== Early life and education ==
Trovillion was born and raised in Winter Park, Florida. He served in the United States Army Air Corps during World War II. He later received his bachelor's degree in building construction from the University of Florida in 1950.

== Career ==
After graduating from college, Trovillion worked as a building contractor. From 1962 to 1967, he served as Mayor of Winter Park. He was elected to the Florida House of Representatives in 1994 and served until 2002.

As a member of the Florida House of Representatives he is best known for his verbal attack on gay youth seeking protections from their schools. Telling several teenagers that "god destroyed Sodom and Gamora, and he's going to destroy you too.."

== Personal life ==
He lived in Winter Park, Florida, with his family.
