= Dexter Lehtinen =

American attorney, politician

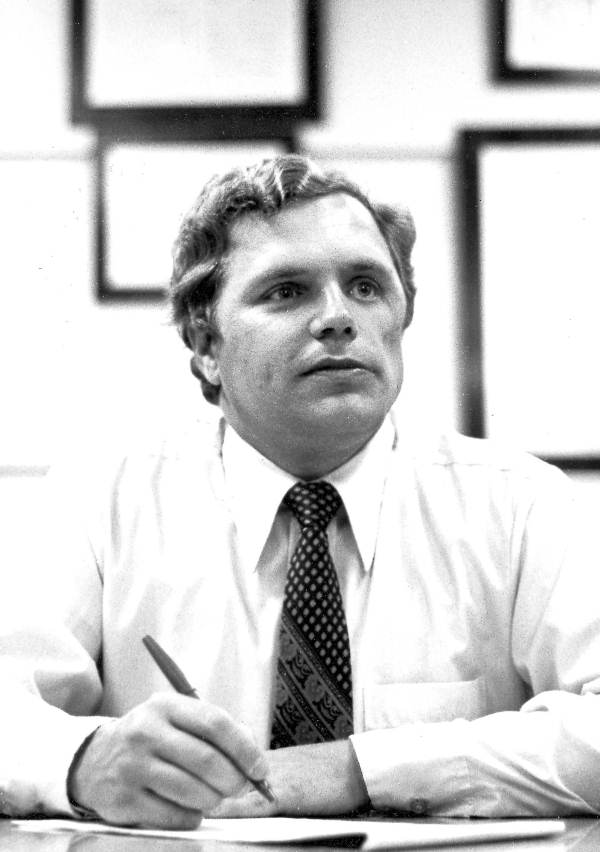
- Lehtinen in 1980

United States Attorney for the Southern District of Florida
- In office June 1988 – January 1992
- President: Ronald Reagan; George H. W. Bush
- Preceded by: Leon Kellner
- Succeeded by: James McAdams (Acting), Roberto Martinez

Member of the Florida Senate from the 40th district
- In office November 4, 1986 – June 11, 1988
- Preceded by: Roberta Fox
- Succeeded by: Javier Souto

Member of the Florida House of Representatives
- In office November 4, 1980 – November 4, 1986
- Preceded by: Charlie Hall
- Succeeded by: Bob Starks
- Constituency: 116th district (1980–1982); 118th district (1982–1986)

Personal details
- Born: Dexter Wayne Lehtinen; March 23, 1946 (age 80) Homestead, Florida, U.S.
- Party: Republican (1985–present)
- Other political affiliations: Democratic (1980–1985)
- Spouse(s): Donna L. Stevenson (divorced) Ileana Ros (m. 1984)
- Children: 4, including Rodrigo Lehtinen
- Education: University of Miami (B.A., 1968); Columbia University (MA; MBA, 1974); Stanford Law School (1975)
- Profession: Attorney

Dexter Wayne Lehtinen (/ˈleɪtənən/ LAY-tən-ən; born March 23, 1946) is an American attorney, former politician, interim U.S. Attorney for south Florida, and a law instructor. He is the husband of former U.S. Congresswoman Ileana Ros-Lehtinen.

== Early life and education ==
Lehtinen is of Finnish ancestry. He graduated from the University of Miami in 1968 magna cum laude with a Bachelor of Arts degree. He then graduated with an MA from Columbia University and an MBA in 1974. In 1975, he graduated first in his class from Stanford Law School. At the University of Miami, he was the Commander of the Corps of Cadets, president of the Florida Federation of College Republicans, and was inducted into the Iron Arrow Honor Society, the highest owner bestowed at the university.

He joined the United States Army as an officer. He received a Purple Heart in 1971 for severe facial injuries during the Vietnam War.

== Florida legislature ==
Dexter Lehtinen, Celia Cruz, Alonso R. del Portillo, Rep. Ileana Ros-Lehtinen, and Pedro Knight, May 1992

In 1980, Lehtinen ran against incumbent Democratic State Representative Gene Flinn in a multi-member southwest Dade County district. Lehtinen came in first in the Democratic primary, garnering 44% of the vote against Flinn and another candidate. In the September primary runoff, Lehtinen defeated Flinn, 64 to 36%. In the general election, he narrowly defeated Republican nominee Chris Ferrer with 51.3% of the vote. In 1982, he won reelection in the newly redrawn 118th district—encompassing parts of rural southwestern Dade and areas stretching from Homestead to Richmond Heights—with 65%. In 1984, he won reelection unopposed.

In February 1985, he left the Democratic Party to become a Republican. This was only a few months before he married Republican State Representative Ileana Ros-Lehtinen. Lehtinen and his wife were both elected in 1986 to the Florida Senate; he was elected in District 40—which included large parts of western and southwestern Dade, including parts of Coral Gables—and she was elected in neighboring District 34.

== U.S. Attorney for South Florida ==
In June 1988, Lehtinen resigned his Florida Senate seat after U.S. Attorney General Edwin Meese took a "high-risk gamble" in naming him to succeed Leon Kellner as U.S. Attorney for the Southern District of Florida. His three biggest cases during his 3 ½ year tenure were the cases of former Panama leader Manuel Noriega, religious sect leader Yahweh ben Yahweh, and Hialeah Mayor Raúl L. Martínez.

The U.S. Senate refused to act on his nomination and Lehtinen on January 13, 1992, called a news conference to announce his resignation. Lehtinen said his departure had nothing to do with a well-publicized internal Justice Department investigation of him because of the Martinez case. The Justice Department opened a case against Lehtinen on charges of misconduct and potential conflicts of interest for investigating "a potential political rival of his wife."

== Post U.S. Attorney career ==
Lehtinen served as the general counsel for the Miccosukee Tribe of Florida Indians until May 2010. In November 2011, the same tribe filed a lawsuit against Lehtinen for alleged malpractice regarding tax advice. In return, Lehtinen filed suit and received judgment against the Tribe.

== Personal life ==
Lehtinen married then-Florida State Representative Ileana Ros on June 9, 1984, while they were both serving in the Florida House of Representatives. They have two children, including Rodrigo Lehtinen. He was previously married to Donna L. Stevenson and had two children with her.

Florida House of Representatives
Preceded by Gene Flinn	Member of the Florida House of Representatives from the 116th district 1980–1982	Succeeded by Art Simon
Preceded by Charlie Hall	Member of the Florida House of Representatives from the 118th district 1982–1986	Succeeded by Bob Starks
Florida Senate
Preceded by Roberta Fox	Member of the Florida Senate from the 40th district 1986–1988	Succeeded by Javier Souto
Legal offices
Preceded by Leon Kellner	United States Attorney for the Southern District of Florida; 1988–1992	Succeeded by Roberto Martinez
