= Florida's 30th House of Representatives district =

American legislative district

Florida's 30th State House of Representatives district
Representative
Chase Tramont; R–Port Orange

Florida's 30th House of Representatives district elects one member of the Florida House of Representatives. It covers parts of Brevard County and Volusia County.

== Members ==
- Karen Castor Dentel
- Bob Cortes (2014–2018)
- Joy Goff-Marcil (2018–2022)
- Chase Tramont (since 2020)
