= David Mealor =

American politician

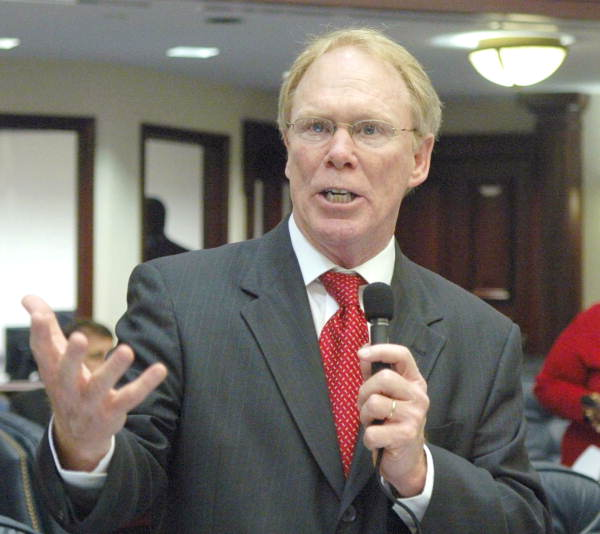
- Mealor in 2006

Member of the Florida House of Representatives from the 34th district
- In office November 7, 2000 – October 31, 2007
- Preceded by: Bob Starks
- Succeeded by: Chris Dorworth

Personal details
- Party: Republican

David J. Mealor is an American politician. He served as a Republican member for the 34th district of the Florida House of Representatives.
