= Vince Fechtel Jr. =

American politician

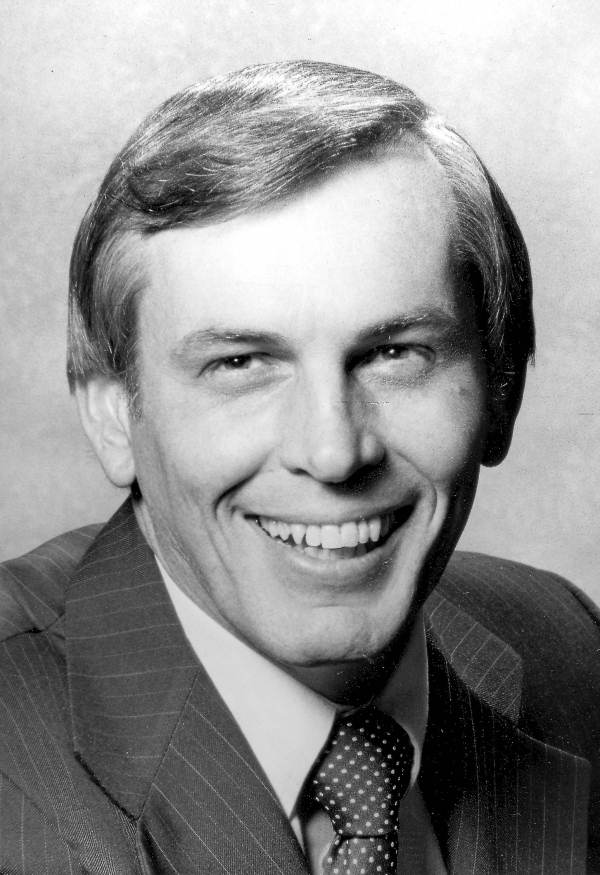

Member of the Florida Senate from the 11th district
- In office November 7, 1978 – November 4, 1980
- Preceded by: James Glisson
- Succeeded by: Dick Langley

Member of the Florida House of Representatives from the 34th district
- In office November 7, 1972 – November 7, 1978
- Preceded by: Gus Craig; Redistricted
- Succeeded by: Bobby Brantley

Personal details
- Born: August 10, 1936 (age 90) Leesburg, Florida
- Party: Republican
- Education: University of Florida
- Occupation: businessman

Vincent J. Fechtel Jr. (born August 10, 1936) is a retired American politician in the state of Florida.

Fechtel was born in Leesburg, Florida. A businessman, he is an alumnus of the University of Florida (Bachelor of Science 1959). He served in the Florida House of Representatives for the 34th district from 1972 to 1978, as a Republican. He was elected to the State Senate from the 11th district in 1978 and served until 1980.

In 1980, Fechtel ran for Florida's 5th Congressional District, which was being vacated by Republican Congressman Richard Kelly. Fechtel lost the Republican primary runoff to Bill McCollum.

In 1983, he was nominated to serve on the United States Parole Commission.
