= Bob Starks =

American politician (born 1945)

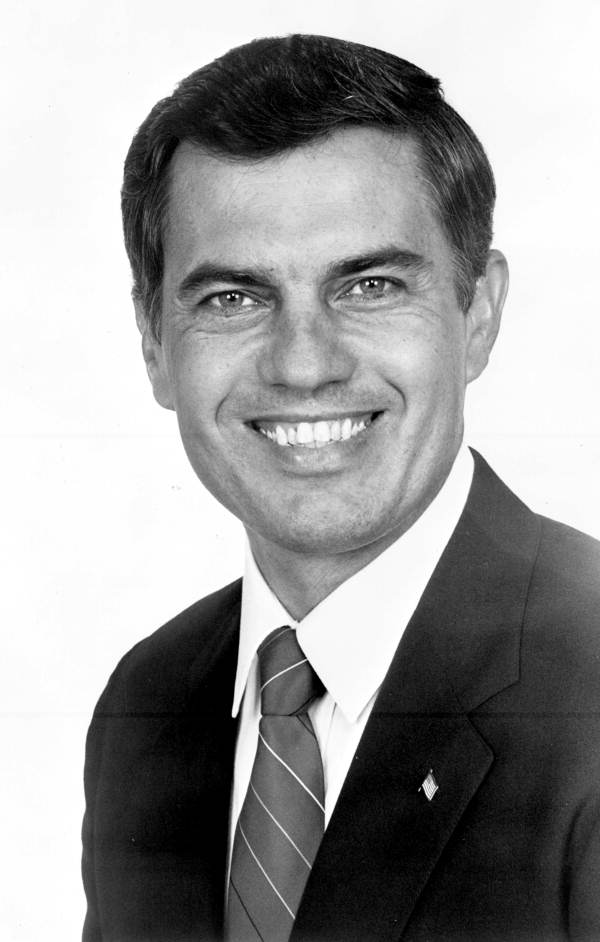
- Starks in 1992

Member of the Florida House of Representatives from the 118th district
- In office 1986–1988
- Preceded by: Dexter Lehtinen
- Succeeded by: Tom Easterly

Member of the Florida House of Representatives from the 36th district
- In office 1990–1992
- Preceded by: Tom Drage
- Succeeded by: Kim Shepard

Member of the Florida House of Representatives from the 34th district
- In office November 3, 1992 – November 7, 2000
- Preceded by: Frank Stone
- Succeeded by: David Mealor

Personal details
- Born: October 14, 1945 (age 80) Tampa, Florida, U.S.
- Party: Republican
- Spouse: Judith Starks
- Education: University of South Florida

Robert J. Starks (born October 14, 1945) is an American politician. He served as a Republican member for the 34th, 36th and 118th district of the Florida House of Representatives.

Starks was born in Tampa, Florida, and attended the University of South Florida, where he earned a bachelor's degree in business administration. In 1986, Starks was elected for the 118th district of the Florida House of Representatives, succeeding Dexter Lehtinen. He served until 1988, when he was succeeded by Tom Easterly. In 1990 he was elected for the 36th district, succeeding Tom Drage. Starks was succeeded by Kim Shepard for the 36th district in 1992, when he was elected for the 34th district, succeeding Frank Stone and serving until 2000 when he was succeeded by David Mealor.
