= Kentucky's 20th Senate district =

American legislative district

Kentucky's 20th State Senate district
Senator
| Gex Williams; R–Verona |
since January 1, 2023
- Registration: 45.5% Democratic; 43.4% Republican; 10.4% No party preference
- Demographics: 84.7% White; 5.7% Black; 4.5% Hispanic; 1.1% Asian; 0.1% Native American; 0.3% Hawaiian/Pacific Islander; 0.5% Other; 3.3% Multiracial
- Population (2023): 114,322
- Registered voters (2025): 91,320

Kentucky's 20th Senatorial district is one of 38 districts in the Kentucky Senate. Stretching from Frankfort to the northern part of the state, it comprises the counties of Carroll, Franklin, Gallatin, Owen, and parts of Boone and Kenton. It has been represented by Gex Williams (R–Verona) since 2023. As of 2023, the district had a population of 114,322.

From 1966 to 1970, the district was represented by Lawrence Wetherby, who had previously served as governor of Kentucky.

== Voter registration ==
On January 1, 2025, the district had 91,320 registered voters, who were registered with the following parties.

| Party | Registration | |
| Party | Voters | % |
|---|---|---|
| Democratic | 41,582 | 45.53 |
| Republican | 39,665 | 43.44 |
| Independent | 4,396 | 4.81 |
| Libertarian | 409 | 0.45 |
| Green | 57 | 0.06 |
| Constitution | 52 | 0.06 |
| Socialist Workers | 16 | 0.02 |
| Reform | 6 | 0.01 |
| "Other" | 5,137 | 5.63 |
| Total | 91,320 | 100.00 |
Source: Kentucky State Board of Elections

== Election results from statewide races ==
=== 2022 – present ===
| Year | Office | Results (Note: Figures presented in this table are calculated by summing precinct election results published by the Kentucky State Board of Elections, using precinct data that list each precinct's senatorial district.) |
|---|---|---|
| 2022 | Senator | Paul 60.3 - 39.7% |
| 2022 | Amendment 1 | No 61.0 - 39.0% |
| 2022 | Amendment 2 | No 56.1 - 43.9% |
| 2023 | Governor | Beshear 55.3 - 44.7% |
| 2023 | Secretary of State | Adams 59.6 - 40.1% |
| 2023 | Attorney General | Coleman 56.3 - 43.7% |
| 2023 | Auditor of Public Accounts | Ball 60.1 - 39.9% |
| 2023 | State Treasurer | Metcalf 54.4 - 45.5% |
| 2023 | Commissioner of Agriculture | Shell 57.8 - 42.2% |
| 2024 | President | Trump 64.4 - 33.9% |
| 2024 | Amendment 1 | Yes 60.9 - 39.1% |
| 2024 | Amendment 2 | No 65.9 - 34.1% |

== List of members representing the district ==
| Member | Party | Years | Electoral history | District location |
|---|---|---|---|---|
| Lawrence Wetherby (Frankfort) | Democratic | January 1, 1966 – January 1, 1970 | Elected in 1965. Retired. | 1964–1972 |
| Mack Walters (Shelbyville) | Democratic | January 1, 1970 – May 11, 1973 | Elected in 1969. Died. | 1964–1972 |
| Mack Walters (Shelbyville) | Democratic | January 1, 1970 – May 11, 1973 | Elected in 1969. Died. | 1972–1974 |
| Tom Easterly (Frankfort) | Democratic | January 1, 1974 – January 1, 1982 | Elected in 1973. Reelected in 1977. Retired. | 1974–1984 |
| Fred Bradley (Frankfort) | Democratic | January 1, 1982 – January 1, 1999 | Elected in 1981. Reelected in 1986. Reelected in 1990. Reelected in 1994. Retired. | 1974–1984 |
| Fred Bradley (Frankfort) | Democratic | January 1, 1982 – January 1, 1999 | Elected in 1981. Reelected in 1986. Reelected in 1990. Reelected in 1994. Retired. | 1984–1993; Bullitt (part), Franklin, Shelby (part), and Spencer Counties. |
| Fred Bradley (Frankfort) | Democratic | January 1, 1982 – January 1, 1999 | Elected in 1981. Reelected in 1986. Reelected in 1990. Reelected in 1994. Retired. | 1993–1997 |
| Fred Bradley (Frankfort) | Democratic | January 1, 1982 – January 1, 1999 | Elected in 1981. Reelected in 1986. Reelected in 1990. Reelected in 1994. Retired. | 1997–2003 |
| Marshall Long (Shelbyville) | Democratic | January 1, 1999 – January 1, 2003 | Elected in 1998. Retired. | 1997–2003 |
| Gary Tapp (Shelbyville) | Republican | January 1, 2003 – January 1, 2011 | Elected in 2002. Reelected in 2006. Retired. | 2003–2015 |
| Paul Hornback (Shelbyville) | Republican | January 1, 2011 – January 1, 2023 | Elected in 2010. Reelected in 2014. Reelected in 2018. Retired. | 2003–2015 |
| Paul Hornback (Shelbyville) | Republican | January 1, 2011 – January 1, 2023 | Elected in 2010. Reelected in 2014. Reelected in 2018. Retired. | 2015–2023 |
| Gex Williams (Verona) | Republican | January 1, 2023 – present | Elected in 2022. Reelected in 2026. | 2023–present |
