= Tom Easterly =

American politician (1940–2005)

Member of the Kentucky Senate from the 20th district
- In office January 1, 1974 – January 1, 1982
- Preceded by: Mack Walters
- Succeeded by: Fred Bradley

Member of the Florida House of Representatives from the 118th district
- In office 1988–1990
- Preceded by: Bob Starks
- Succeeded by: Daryl Jones

Personal details
- Born: Charles Thomas Easterly; April 21, 1940 Columbus, Ohio, U.S.
- Died: June 15, 2005 (aged 65) Hurricane, West Virginia, U.S.
- Party: Democratic
- Education: Carleton College; University of Kentucky; University of Tennessee

Charles Thomas Easterly (April 21, 1940 – June 15, 2005) was an American politician. He served as a Democratic member for the Kentucky Senate, as well as the Florida House of Representatives.

Born in Columbus, Ohio, the son of Ethel and Edgar E. Easterly. Easterly attended Eastern High School, later graduating in 1958. He then attended Carleton College, where he played baseball and American football, graduating with Latin honors and the honor society Phi Beta Kappa. He moved to Paris and later attended the University of Kentucky, earning his master's degree.

During his service in the United States Army, he was awarded a Bronze Star Medal. After that, he taught the language French and attended at the University of Tennessee, where he learned about law. He taught at the Kentucky State University, teaching about the languages German and Spanish and about administrator law.

Easterly served in the Kentucky Senate from 1974 to 1981. He was the Democratic nominee to the United States House of Representatives for the 6th's district of Kentucky in 1978 and 1980, losing both times to Republican nominee Larry J. Hopkins. In 1985, he moved to Miami, Florida. In 1988, he was elected to represent the 118th district of the Florida House of Representatives, succeeding Bob Starks. In 1990, he was succeeded by Daryl Jones. He moved to Beckley, West Virginia in 2000.

Easterly died in June 2005 of a traffic collision in Hurricane, West Virginia, at the age of 65.
