= Mike Ward (American politician) =

American politician

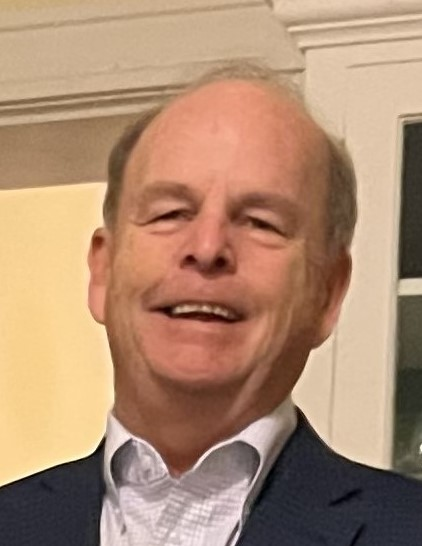

Member of the U.S. House of Representatives from Kentucky's 3rd district
- In office January 3, 1995 – January 3, 1997
- Preceded by: Romano Mazzoli
- Succeeded by: Anne Northup

Member of the Kentucky House of Representatives from the 34th district
- In office January 1, 1989 – November 1993
- Preceded by: Jack Will
- Succeeded by: Mary Lou Marzian

Personal details
- Born: January 7, 1951 (age 75) White Plains, New York, U.S.
- Party: Democratic
- Education: University of Louisville (BS)

Michael Delavan Ward (born January 7, 1951) is an American former politician and radio talk show host who served as a United States representative from Kentucky. He is a member of the Democratic Party. He is a volunteer senior advisor to Louisville mayor Craig Greenberg.

== Early life and career ==
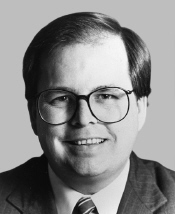
Ward in 1995.

Ward was born in White Plains, New York on January 7, 1951. Ward's mother, Lukey Ward, was a political and civil rights activist, and Ward has often said publicly that he was born into politics. Lukey Ward was, along with her friend Georgia Davis, the day-to-day manager of the Kentucky chapter of Martin Luther King Jr.'s Southern Christian Leadership Conference.

She and Georgia were at the Lorraine Motel, waiting to go to dinner with Dr. King, when he was assassinated as he exited his room. Ward's father, Jasper Ward III, was a well-known award-winning architect in Louisville.

Ward III's buildings include the Student Activities Center at the University of Louisville and the Doctor's Office Building (now the UofL Health – Medical Plaza II) at Floyd and Liberty Streets. Ward III's work can be accessed at the Filson Historical Society's collection.

Ward is also the great-great-grandson of Jasper D. Ward, a former 1800s Chicago Congressman and great-grandson of businessman William Delavan Baldwin.

Ward attended the University of Louisville, from which he earned a business degree. Before his election to congress, he served as a sales executive.

Ward has been married to Tina Heavrin since 1975.

== Political and radio career ==
From 1989 to 1993, Ward served as a member of the Kentucky House of Representatives representing the Highlands area of Louisville. He was first elected to the state house in 1988, defeating incumbent Republican Jack Will. He had previously lost a special election to Will in August 1987. He resigned from the house in November 1993 in order to run for congress.

In 1994, he was elected to the United States House of Representatives, winning Kentucky's Third Congressional District seat that was being vacated by Romano L. Mazzoli. Ward was one of few Democrats to win an open seat in the Republican congressional landslide that year. Ward narrowly defeated a field of candidates including Charlie Owen in the primary, and defeated Republican nominee Susan Bush Stokes, a fellow member of the Kentucky House of Representatives, in the general election. His Campaign TV advertising was directed by Kevin Geddings of Geddings Communications LLC of Washington, DC.

In 1996 Ward lost his seat in the general election to Republican Anne Northup. Ward did not run again for the seat.

Ward was appointed by President Bill Clinton as the Associate Director of the Peace Corps and served through Clinton's second presidential term.

From 2002 to 2005, Ward hosted a talk radio show in Louisville that was a liberal counterweight to conservative talk radio programming.

Ward was a political consultant with the Saint Communications Group until 2010 when he established WardCampaigns, Inc.

Ward has spent the years since 2005 working for a wide variety of candidates and causes in over 20 states including races at every level of elected office.

In 2021 Ward created Blue Wave America,

U.S. House of Representatives
Preceded by Romano L. Mazzoli	Member of the U.S. House of Representatives from Kentucky's 3rd congressional district 1995–1997	Succeeded by Anne Northup
U.S. order of precedence (ceremonial)
Preceded by Peter Plympton Smith as Former U.S. Representative	Order of precedence of the United States as Former U.S. Representative	Succeeded by David Davis as Former U.S. Representative
