= Charlie Hall (politician) =

American politician

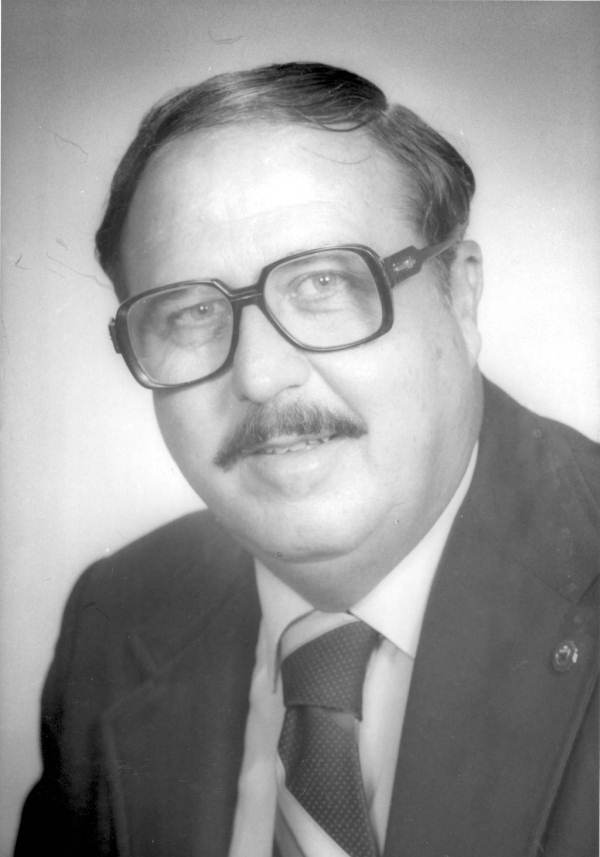

Member of the Florida House of Representatives from the 118th district
- In office 1980–1982
- Preceded by: John Cyril Malloy
- Succeeded by: Dexter Lehtinen

Personal details
- Born: Charles Albert Hall; May 7, 1930 Miami, Florida, U.S.
- Died: November 20, 2014 (aged 84) Tallahassee, Florida, U.S.
- Party: Democratic
- Spouse: Cynthia Hall
- Education: Florida International University (BS)

Charles Albert Hall Jr. (May 7, 1930 – November 20, 2014) was an American firefighter, labor activist, and politician who served as a member of the Florida House of Representatives from 1980 to 1982.

== Early life and education ==
Born in Miami, Florida, Hall received his bachelor's degree in labor from Florida International University and his certificate in the trade union program from the Harvard Business School.

== Career ==
He served as a firefighter for the City of Miami from 1952 to 1979. He was also involved with his labor union. He was also a professor at Florida International University and served on the Miami-Dade Ethics Commission. From 1980 to 1982, Hall served in the Florida House of Representatives and was a Democrat.

== Personal life ==
Hall died in Tallahassee, Florida.
