= Kim Shepard =

American politician and judge (born 1961)

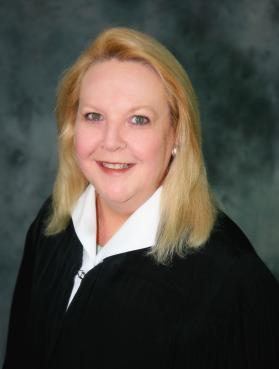

Judge of the 9th Judicial Circuit of Florida, Group 10
- In office January 6, 2015 – August 24, 2018
- Preceded by: C. Jeffery Arnold
- Succeeded by: Denise Beamer

Member of the Florida House of Representatives from the 36th district
- In office November 3, 1992 – November 8, 1994
- Preceded by: Bob Starks
- Succeeded by: Allen Trovillion

Personal details
- Born: October 27, 1961 (age 64) Jacksonville, Florida
- Party: Democratic
- Education: Hollins College (B.A.); University of Florida (J.D.)
- Occupation: Attorney

Kimberly Michele Shepard (born October 27, 1961) is a lawyer from Florida who served as a judge on the 9th Judicial Circuit of Florida from 2015 to 2018. Prior to her judicial service, she was a member of the Florida House of Representatives, and represented the 36th district from 1992 to 1994.

== Early life ==
Shepard was born in Jacksonville, Florida, in 1961. She graduated from Hollins College in Roanoke, Virginia, in 1983 with her bachelor's degree in American studies. Shepard worked for the Fourth Judicial Circuit State Attorney's office before attending law school at the University of Florida, graduating in 1989. After graduation, she worked for the Ninth Judicial Circuit State Attorney's office as a prosecutor, and resigned from the office in 1992 to run for the legislature.

== Florida House of Representatives ==
In 1992, Shepard ran for the Florida House of Representatives from the 36th district, which included much of downtown Orlando, Maitland, and Winter Park in Orange County. She won the Democratic nomination unopposed and faced incumbent Republican Representative Bruce McEwan, who was seeking his seventh term in the legislature, in the general election. Shepard campaigned on a tough-on-crime platform, and criticized McEwen for his ineffectiveness in the legislature. She narrowly unseated McEwan, winning 51 percent of the vote to his 49 percent.

Shepard ran for re-election in 1994. Three Republican candidates launched campaigns against her, and former Winter Park Mayor Allen Trovillion ultimately won the nomination. The Orlando Sentinel "enthusiastically endorse[d]" Shepard for re-election, stating: "Ms. Shepard has done well. She has kept her promises. She has worked hard." Trovillion ultimately defeated Shepard by a wide margin, winning 57 percent of the vote to her 43 percent.

== Judicial service ==
In 2014, Shepard ran for a seat on the 9th Judicial Circuit of Florida, and faced Norberto Katz, an attorney and child-support-hearing officer, in the nonpartisan election. The Sentinel endorsed Katz over Shepard, praising her for the "admirable examples of community in her past," but preferring Katz's trial experience.

During the campaign, Shepard attacked Katz for his 1995 suspension from the practice of law for misconduct, sending out mailers that stated that he had been "FOUND GUILTY!!" of dishonesty. Katz suggested that Shepard had included a photoshopped picture of herself on her campaign materials, and criticized her for quoting the 1994 endorsement language from the Sentinel and falsely suggesting that the Sentinel had endorsed her in the race. Shepard defeated Katz, receiving 60 percent of the vote to his 40 percent.

Following the campaign, the Florida Bar investigated "a complaint regarding [Shepard's] conduct" during the campaign, and the following year, the Florida Judicial Qualifications Commission opened its own investigation. Shepard argued that the mailers were not deceptive, and that the context made clear that the endorsement was not for the 2014 race. A panel of the commission recommended suspending her for ninety days without pay and publicly reprimanding her, and expressed concern for her "inability to recognize or understand her inappropriate actions and reactions to these proceedings." The Supreme Court of Florida unanimously accepted the recommendation, noting that she "has not shown any remorse for her misconduct." Shepard appealed her suspension to the United States Supreme Court, arguing that it violated her right to free speech under the First Amendment, but the Court declined to review the case.

On August 24, 2018, Shepard resigned from the bench. Governor Rick Scott appointed Denise Beamer as her successor.
