= Kentucky's 34th House of Representatives district =

American legislative district

Kentucky's 34th State House of Representatives district
Representative
Sarah Stalker; D–Louisville
since January 1, 2023
- Registration: 56.7% Democratic; 30.7% Republican; 11.9% No party preference
- Demographics: 84.8% White; 5.2% Black; 2.5% Hispanic; 3.0% Asian; 0.1% Native American; 0.5% Other; 4.0% Multiracial
- Population (2024): 45,217
- Registered voters (2026): 39,498

Kentucky's 34th House of Representatives district is one of 100 districts in the Kentucky House of Representatives. It comprises part of Jefferson County. It has been represented by Sarah Stalker (D–Louisville) since 2023. As of 2024, the district had a population of 45,217.

== Voter registration ==
On January 1, 2026, the district had 39,498 registered voters, who were registered with the following parties.

Party	Registration	
Party	Voters	%
Democratic	22,409	56.73
Republican	12,138	30.73
Independent	2,561	6.48
Libertarian	190	0.48
Green	45	0.11
Constitution	14	0.04
Socialist Workers	12	0.03
Reform	0	0.00
"Other"	2,129	5.39
Total	39,498	100.00

== List of members representing the district ==
Member	Party	Years	Electoral history	District location
David Karem (Louisville)	Democratic	January 1, 1972 – January 1, 1976	Elected in 1971. Reelected in 1973. Retired to run for the Kentucky Senate.	1972–1974; Jefferson County (part).
David Karem (Louisville)	Democratic	January 1, 1972 – January 1, 1976	Elected in 1971. Reelected in 1973. Retired to run for the Kentucky Senate.	1974–1985; Jefferson County (part).
Gerta Bendl (Louisville)	Democratic	January 1, 1976 – June 25, 1987	Elected in 1975. Reelected in 1977. Reelected in 1979. Reelected in 1981. Reelected in 1984. Reelected in 1986. Died.	1974–1985; Jefferson County (part).
Gerta Bendl (Louisville)	Democratic	January 1, 1976 – June 25, 1987	Elected in 1975. Reelected in 1977. Reelected in 1979. Reelected in 1981. Reelected in 1984. Reelected in 1986. Died.	1985–1993; Jefferson County (part).
Jack Will (Louisville)	Republican	August 1987 – January 1, 1989	Elected to finish Bendl's term. Lost reelection.	1985–1993; Jefferson County (part).
Mike Ward (Louisville)	Democratic	January 1, 1989 – November 1993	Elected in 1988. Reelected in 1990. Reelected in 1992. Resigned to run for Kentucky's; 3rd congressional district.	1985–1993; Jefferson County (part).
Mike Ward (Louisville)	Democratic	January 1, 1989 – November 1993	Elected in 1988. Reelected in 1990. Reelected in 1992. Resigned to run for Kentucky's; 3rd congressional district.	1993–1997; Jefferson County (part).
Mary Lou Marzian (Louisville)	Democratic	January 13, 1994 – January 1, 2023	Elected to finish Ward's term. Reelected in 1994. Reelected in 1996. Reelected in 1998. Reelected in 2000. Reelected in 2002. Reelected in 2004. Reelected in 2006. Reelected in 2008. Reelected in 2010. Reelected in 2012. Reelected in 2014. Reelected in 2016. Reelected in 2018. Reelected in 2020. Retired after being redistricted to the 41st district.	1993–1997; Jefferson County (part).
Mary Lou Marzian (Louisville)	Democratic	January 13, 1994 – January 1, 2023	Elected to finish Ward's term. Reelected in 1994. Reelected in 1996. Reelected in 1998. Reelected in 2000. Reelected in 2002. Reelected in 2004. Reelected in 2006. Reelected in 2008. Reelected in 2010. Reelected in 2012. Reelected in 2014. Reelected in 2016. Reelected in 2018. Reelected in 2020. Retired after being redistricted to the 41st district.	1997–2003
Mary Lou Marzian (Louisville)	Democratic	January 13, 1994 – January 1, 2023	Elected to finish Ward's term. Reelected in 1994. Reelected in 1996. Reelected in 1998. Reelected in 2000. Reelected in 2002. Reelected in 2004. Reelected in 2006. Reelected in 2008. Reelected in 2010. Reelected in 2012. Reelected in 2014. Reelected in 2016. Reelected in 2018. Reelected in 2020. Retired after being redistricted to the 41st district.	2003–2015
Mary Lou Marzian (Louisville)	Democratic	January 13, 1994 – January 1, 2023	Elected to finish Ward's term. Reelected in 1994. Reelected in 1996. Reelected in 1998. Reelected in 2000. Reelected in 2002. Reelected in 2004. Reelected in 2006. Reelected in 2008. Reelected in 2010. Reelected in 2012. Reelected in 2014. Reelected in 2016. Reelected in 2018. Reelected in 2020. Retired after being redistricted to the 41st district.	2015–2023
Sarah Stalker (Louisville)	Democratic	January 1, 2023 – present	Elected in 2022. Reelected in 2024. Reelected in 2026.	2023–present
