= William Delavan Baldwin =

American businessman

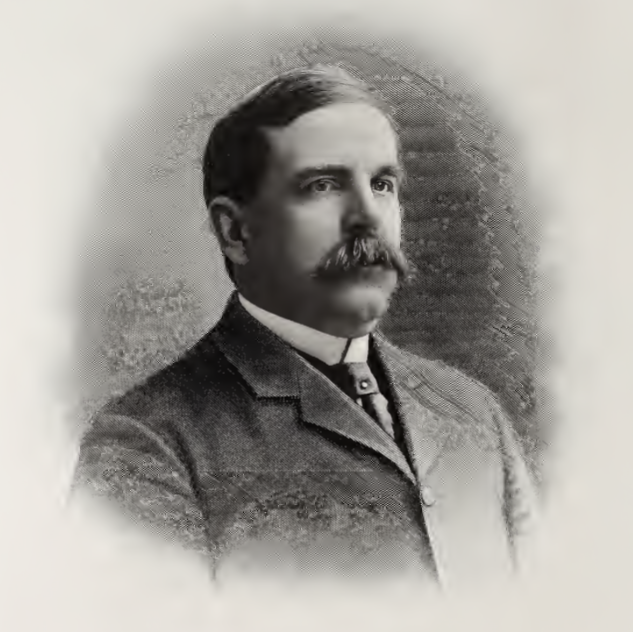
- Born: September 5, 1856; Auburn, New York, US
- Died: September 26, 1930 (aged 74); Yorktown Heights, New York, US
- Occupation: Businessman
- Known for: President of Otis Elevator Company
- Spouse: Helen Runyon Sullivan

Signature
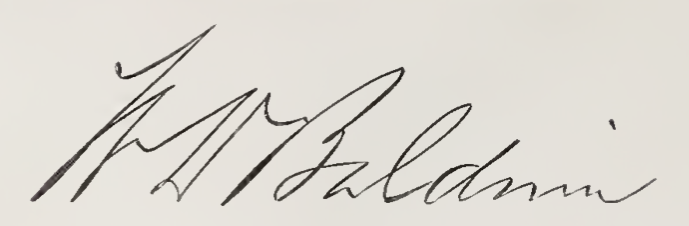

William Delavan Baldwin (5 September 1856 – 26 September 1930) was an American businessman.

== Biography ==
William Delavan Baldwin was born on September 5, 1856, to Lovewell Hurd Baldwin and Sarah Jane Munson in Auburn, New York. He was a descendant of John Baldwin, one of the first settlers in Dedham, Massachusetts.

Baldwin was interested in mechanics and soon went to work for D. M. Osborne & Co. He excelled at business and was promoted within the company, eventually being sent to Europe to extend the firm's business there at twenty-one. He stayed in this position for five years, but eventually decided he wanted to return to the United States. In 1882, he resigned from the company to pursue his interest in the manufacturing of elevators, and joined Otis Brothers & Co, the precursor to the Otis Elevator Company, as its treasurer. At the time, elevators were "something of a novelty," and going into the business was seen as a "prescient" decision. Baldwin was noted for his business skill, courteousness, integrity, and perseverance. He took the lead in reorganizing the business, and was "largely instrumental" in the direction and organization of the Otis Elevator Company during his time there. He eventually served as president and director, as well as general manager and chairman of the board of the company, which by then was the largest manufacturer of elevators in the world.

Baldwin was involved in several other business and financial enterprises in addition to his work at Otis, and held high positions in several of them, including being named the vice president of the First National Bank of Yonkers. and Director of the Lincoln Trust Company and Home Insurance Company. He was also politically active as a member of the Republican party, but never sought to run for office, even declining a nomination by the party in 1892 for Congress; although his great grandson, Michael Delavan Ward, did serve in Congress, elected for one term in 1994 in Kentucky's 3rd congressional district, in Louisville. Baldwin was a member of a number of clubs and other political and social organizations including the Chamber of Commerce, the American Geographic Society, the Union League, the Adirondack League Club, and the Lawyers', Engineers', Racquet and Tennis, and National Arts clubs. He served as President of The First Church of Christ, Scientist for one term from 1910 to 1911, and president of the board of trustees for one of its New York branch churches, Second Church of Christ, Scientist, New York.

Baldwin died in his home in Yorktown Heights, New York on September 26, 1930.

== Personal life ==
In 1881, he married Helen Runyon Sullivan, the daughter of Nahum M. Sullivan, a prominent New York merchant, and had at least seven children with her.

Delavan Terrace, now part of Delavan Terrace Historic District, is named after him, and his former 550-acre estate in New York is now part of Donald J. Trump State Park.
