= Jack Will =

American politician

Member of the Kentucky House of Representatives from the 34th district
- In office August 1987 – January 1, 1989
- Preceded by: Gerta Bendl
- Succeeded by: Mike Ward

Personal details
- Born: 1946 (age 79–80)
- Party: Republican

Jack Will (born 1946) is an American politician from Kentucky who was a member of the Kentucky House of Representatives from August 1987 to January 1989. Will was elected in an August 1987 special election following the death of incumbent representative Gerta Bendl. He was defeated for reelection in 1988 by Democrat Mike Ward.
