= Dick Langley =

American attorney and politician

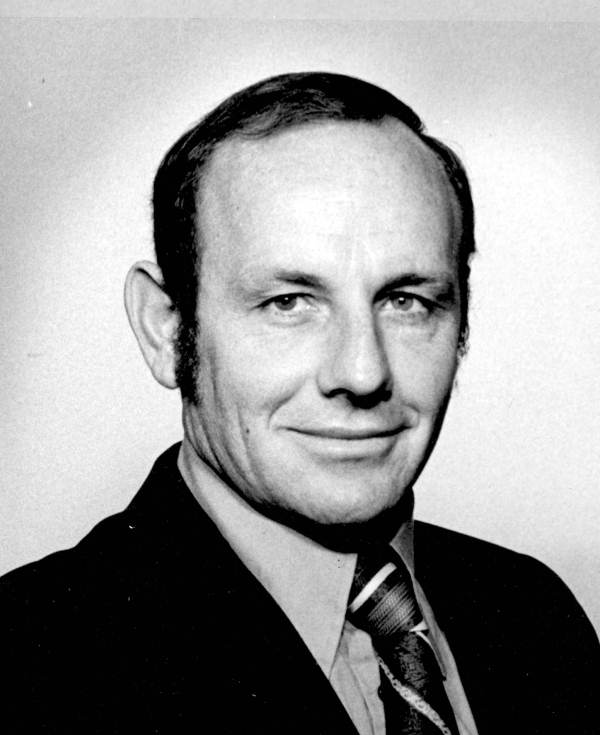

Member of the Florida House of Representatives from the 35th district
- In office November 7, 1972 – November 7, 1978
- Preceded by: William R. Conway
- Succeeded by: Everett Kelly

Member of the Florida Senate from the 11th district
- In office November 4, 1980 - November 3, 1992
- Preceded by: Vince Fechtel Jr.
- Succeeded by: Karen Johnson

Personal details
- Born: February 22, 1937 Lakeland, Florida
- Died: August 9, 2017 (aged 80)
- Party: Republican
- Education: University of Florida
- Occupation: attorney

Richard H. Langley (February 22, 1937 – August 9, 2017) was an American attorney and politician in the state of Florida.

Langley was born in Lakeland. He attended the University of Florida. He served in the Florida House of Representatives for the 35th district from 1973 to 1978, as a Republican. He was elected to the State Senate for the 11th district in 1980 and served until 1992. He served on Florida's 1997 Constitutional Revision Commission.
