= Sarah Stalker =

American politician

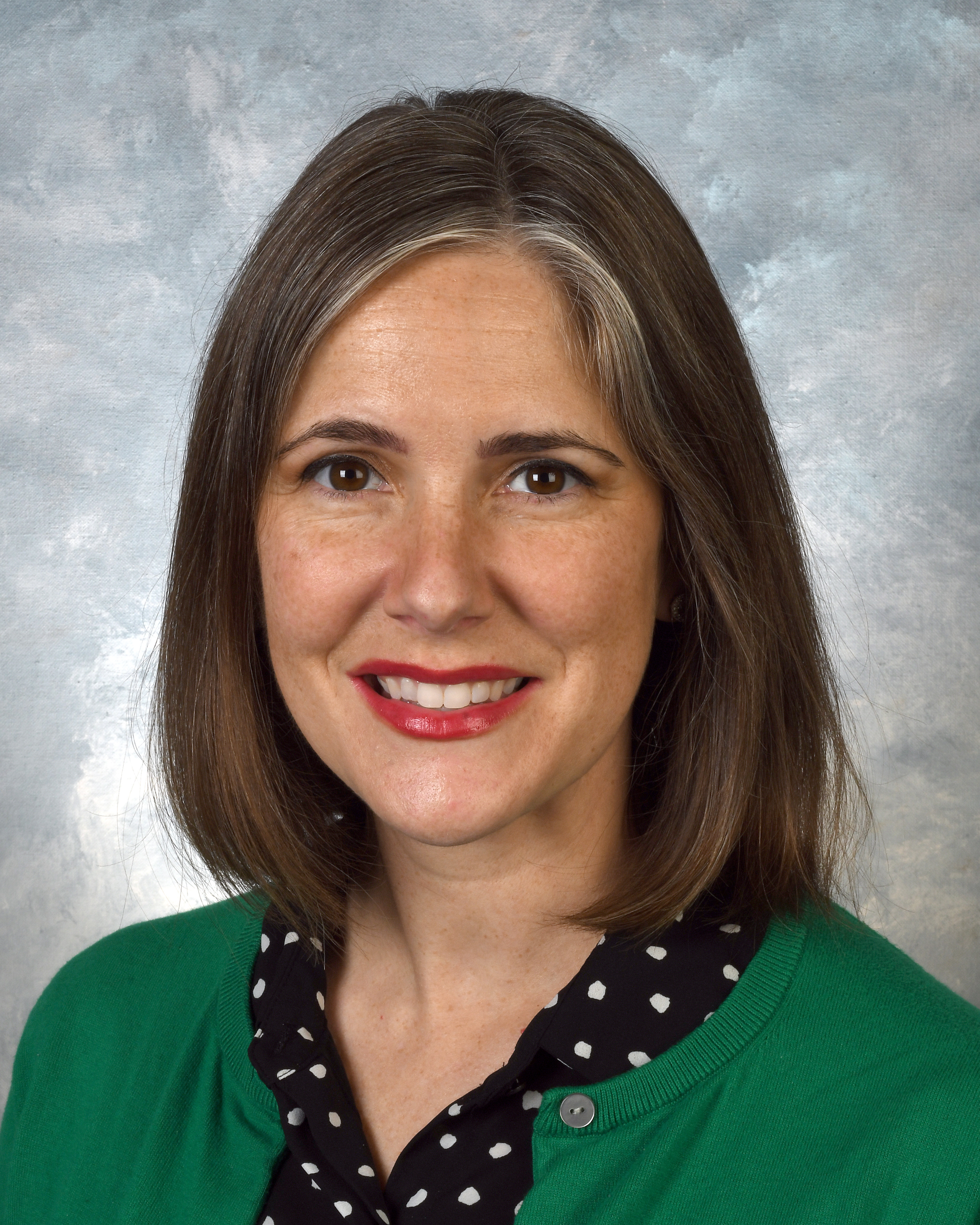

Member of the Kentucky House of Representatives from the 34th district
- Incumbent
- Assumed office January 1, 2023
- Preceded by: Mary Lou Marzian

Personal details
- Born: Louisville, Kentucky, US
- Party: Democratic
- Spouse: Javan Roy-Bachman
- Education: Bachelor of Fine Arts
- Alma mater: Stephens College

Sarah Margaret Stalker is an American politician who has served as a member of the Kentucky House of Representatives since January 1, 2023. She represents Kentucky's 34th House district.

== Biography ==
Stalker attended Louisville Male High School and earned a Bachelor of Fine Arts from Stephens College.

== Electoral history ==
=== 2020 ===
2020 Saint Regis Park Council election (vote for 7)
Party	Candidate	Votes	%
Nonpartisan	Cheryl M. Willett	617	N/A
Nonpartisan	Louie Schweickhardt	596	N/A
Nonpartisan	Eric Shackelford	519	N/A
Nonpartisan	Matthew "Matt" Sanderfer	490	N/A
Nonpartisan	Craig Theis	476	N/A
Nonpartisan	Jeffrey D. Weis	461	N/A
Nonpartisan	John Amback	458	N/A
Nonpartisan	Sarah Stalker	453	N/A
Nonpartisan	Don "DJ" Fountain	401	N/A
Nonpartisan	Javan Roy-Bachman	284	N/A

=== 2022 ===
Democratic primary results
Party	Candidate	Votes	%
Democratic	Sarah Stalker	4,958	61.3
Democratic	Jonathan Lowe	3,132	38.7
Total votes		8,090	100.0

2022 Kentucky House of Representatives 34th district election
Party	Candidate	Votes	%
Democratic	Sarah Stalker	Unopposed	
Total votes		16,352	100.0
Democratic hold			

=== 2024 ===
2024 Kentucky House of Representatives 34th district election
Party	Candidate	Votes	%
Democratic	Sarah Stalker (incumbent)	Unopposed	
Total votes		19,214	100.0
Democratic hold			

Kentucky House of Representatives
Preceded by Mary Lou Marzian	Member of the Kentucky House of Representatives; 2023–present	Succeeded by incumbent
