= Karen Johnson (Florida politician) =

American politician (1943–2025)

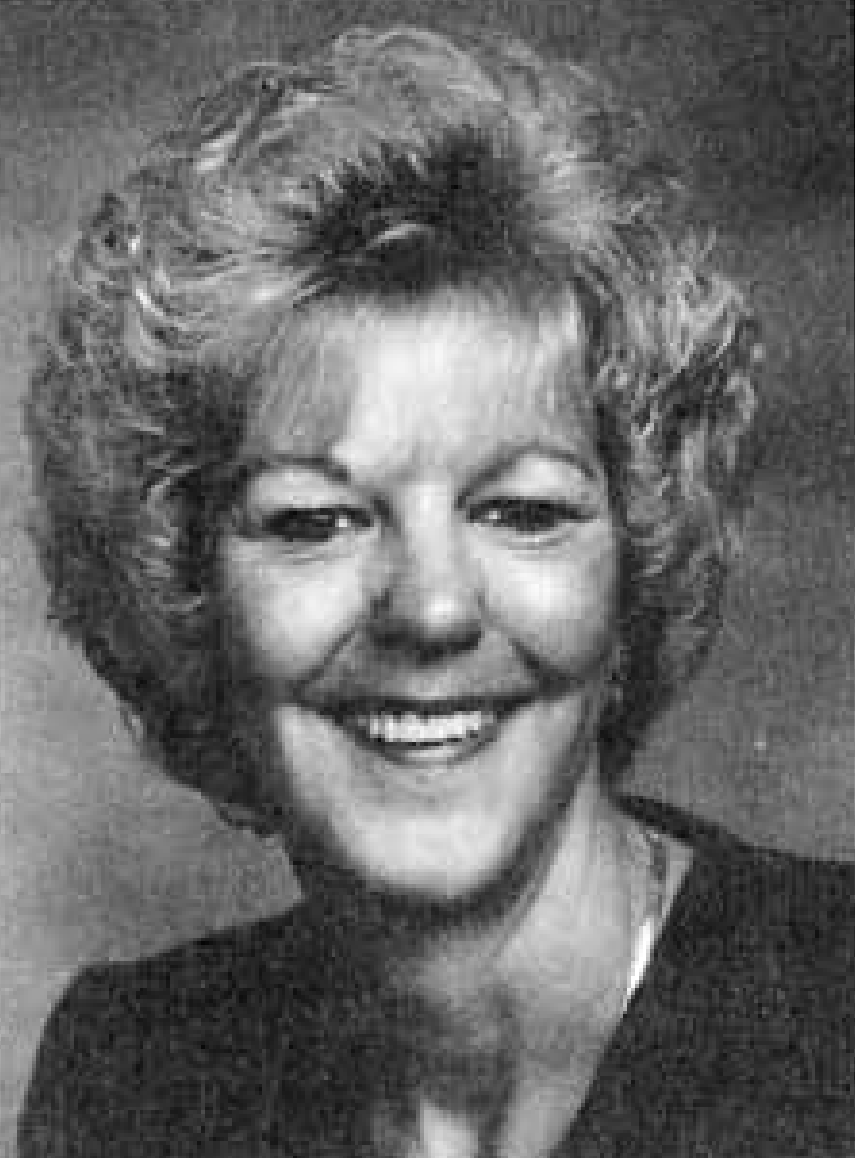

Member of the Florida Senate from the 11th district
- In office November 3, 1992 – November 5, 1996
- Preceded by: Dick Langley
- Succeeded by: Anna Cowin

Personal details
- Born: November 16, 1943 Pittsburgh, Pennsylvania, U.S.
- Died: April 19, 2025 (aged 81)
- Party: Democratic

Karen Johnson (November 16, 1943 – April 19, 2025) was a Democratic politician who served as a member of the Florida Senate from 1992 to 1996 and on the Citrus County School Board from 1982 to 1992.

== Early life and career ==
Johnson was born in Pittsburgh, Pennsylvania, and moved to Florida in 1958. She worked as a substitute teacher and school volunteer, and served on the Inverness Middle School Parent-Teacher Association.

In 1982, Johnson ran for the Citrus County School Board in the 5th District, challenging incumbent Board member Ralph Hoffman in the Democratic primary. She campaigned on her experience as a school volunteer and substitute teacher, and argued that School Board meetings should be moved to evenings to allow students and parents to attend. Johnson narrowly defeated Hoffman in the primary, and was elected unopposed in the general election, becoming the first female member of the Board since 1968.

Johnson ran for re-election in 1986, and was challenged by C. L. Calloway, a district manager for an electric cooperative, and Pastor Larry Powers. Johnson won renomination in a landslide, receiving 61 percent of the vote and avoiding a runoff. No other candidates filed to run against her, and she won the general election unopposed.

In 1990, Johnson won the Democratic nomination unopposed, and faced Republican nominee Lennie Berger, a businessman who operated a child placement firm, in the general election. Johnson defeated Berger in a landslide, winning 63 percent of the vote.

== Florida Senate ==
Johnson announced that she would step down from the School Board and run for the State Senate in 1992. Johnson initially planned on running to succeed Democratic State Senator Karen Thurman, who opted to run for Congress, in the 4th District. However, after redistricting divided Citrus County, Johnson instead ran in the 11th District, challenging Republican State Senator Dick Langley for re-election.

She faced rancher Owen Conner in the Democratic primary, and was endorsed by the St. Petersburg Times, which praised her "straightforward constituent-oriented style of politics" whose "progressive platform makes her the easy choice." Johnson won the nomination in a landslide, receiving 68 percent of the vote to Conner's 32 percent.

In the general election, Johnson faced Langley, and the election was viewed by both parties as vital for their efforts to win a majority in the State Senate. Johnson ultimately defeated Langley by a narrow margin, winning 53 percent of the vote to his 47 percent.

== 1996 campaign for Citrus County Superintendent ==
In 1996, Johnson announced that she would run for Citrus County Superintendent of Public Schools rather than seek a second term in the State Senate. She faced Homosassa Elementary School principal Bob Burst and J. Casey Kearse, a retired school administrator, in the Democratic primary. In the primary, Johnson placed first with 42 percent of the vote, and advanced to a runoff election with Brust, who placed second with 31 percent. Brust defeated Johnson in the runoff by a wide margin, winning 64 percent of the vote to her 36 percent.

== Death ==
Johnson died on April 19, 2025.
