= Chris Dorworth =

American politician

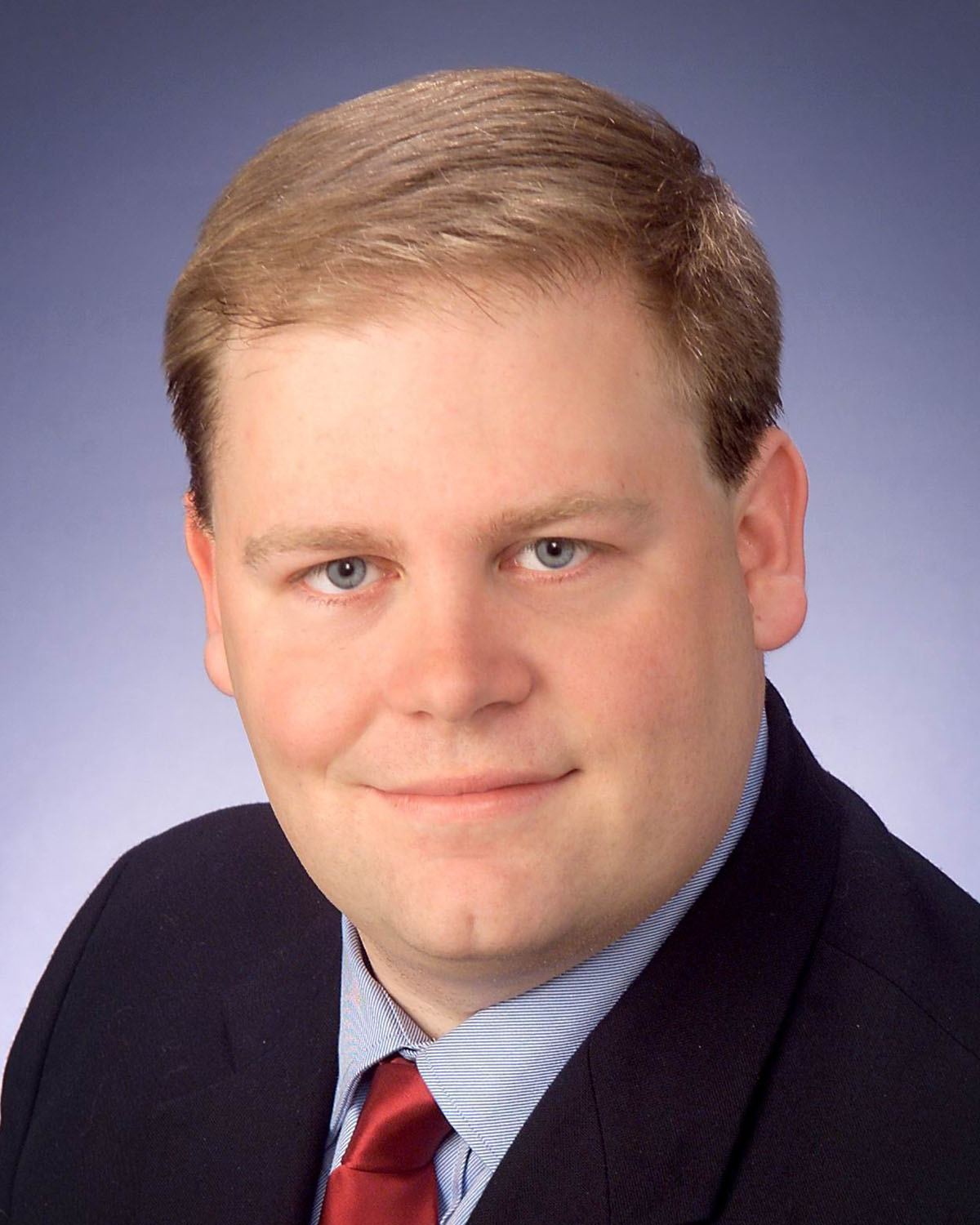

Member of the Florida House of Representatives from the 34th district
- In office November 6, 2007 – November 6, 2012
- Preceded by: David Mealor
- Succeeded by: Jimmie Todd Smith

Personal details
- Born: July 17, 1976 (age 50) Fort Lauderdale, Florida
- Party: Republican
- Education: University of Florida; Duke University
- Profession: Health care consultant

Chris Dorworth (born July 17, 1976) is a former Republican member of the Florida House of Representatives, representing the 34th District, which consisted of a small amount of Orange County and western Seminole County, from 2007 to 2012. In 2012, he ran for re-election in the 29th District, and he lost in an upset to Democratic candidate Mike Clelland.

== Early life ==
Chris Dorworth was born July 17, 1976, in Fort Lauderdale, Florida. While a senior at the University of Florida, Dorworth served as president of the student body and was a member of Florida Blue Key. He received his bachelor's degree from the University of Florida in 1998, was named the Outstanding Male Graduate of his graduating class, and is in the University of Florida Hall of Fame. Dorworth received his master's in business administration from Duke University in 2006.

== Career ==
Dorworth served briefly as the chairman of the Seminole Soil & Water Conservation District and the vice-chairman of the Seminole County Planning & Zoning Commission. He then was elected to the Florida Legislature. He was appointed chairman of the board of trustees of Seminole Community College, by Governor Jeb Bush and re-appointed by Governor Charlie Crist.

Currently living in Lake Mary, Florida, Dorworth has served as the co-chair of the House Redistricting Subcommittee, Chair of the Rulemaking and Regulation Committee, Vice-Chair of the Appropriations Committee, a member of the Redistricting Committee and a member of the Rules & Calendar Committee.

In 2010, Dorworth was elected by his fellow Republicans to serve as Speaker of the Florida House of Representatives during the 2014-2016 term, provided Republicans maintained control of the Florida House of Representatives. But in 2012, Dorworth was unexpectedly defeated for re-election by Democrat Mike Clelland, and Steve Crisafulli was then named as speaker-designate for 2014-2016.

== Ethics complaints and Lawsuits ==
In late 2010, an ethics complaint was filed against Dorworth with the Florida Commission on Ethics. The complaint alleged that Dorworth failed to properly disclose his assets, liabilities, and income. The complaint was unanimously dismissed by the Florida Ethics Commission without any finding of probable cause.

In 2011, Dorworth was again the target of ethics questions when a business associate of his was appointed to the Orlando-Orange County Expressway Authority immediately prior to a vote that would lead to a substantial profit for a business partner of Dorworth. These questions were ultimately allayed when the associate agreed to abstain for all votes for a two-year period.

On June 4, 2014, a grand jury investigating the Orlando-Orange County Expressway Authority issued indictments against Dorworth and two others for violations of the state's open meetings law.

In July 2017, a 17-year old girl who had attended a party at Dorworth's home claimed to have had sexual relations with Representative Matt Gaetz at the party. Through her lawyers, the girl tendered a financial settlement offer to Gaetz and Dorworth. Dorworth then sued the girl for defamation but subsequently dropped his lawsuit against her. A hacker obtained unredacted court records from the lawsuit, which were reported to include damaging evidence against Matt Gaetz, who had been nominated for Attorney General by President-elect Donald Trump. Documents generated by the lawsuit were given to the House Ethics Committee investigating Gaetz, who withdrew from consideration as a nominee for Attorney General.
