= Ron Schultz =

American politician

Member of the Florida House of Representatives from the 43 district
- In office 2007-2010

Personal details
- Born: December 20, 1938 New York City, New York
- Died: February 6, 2023 (aged 84) Tallahassee, Florida
- Party: Republican
- Profession: Property Appraiser

Ron Schultz was a Homosassa, Florida Republican (United States) politician who served as the District 43 Representative in the House of Representatives of the U.S. state of Florida. He was first elected to the Florida House on June 26, 2007, in a special election and was re-elected in 2008.

== Biography ==
Schultz was born on December 20, 1938, in Yonkers, New York. He came to Florida in 1945. He attended Shimer College from 1955 to 1958. In 1965, he received a Bachelor of Arts degree from University of South Florida and received a Master of Arts degree from the university in 1967.

In 1976, he was appointed by Reubin Askew to serve as Pinellas County Property Appraiser and served till 1998. Two years later, Bob Martinez appointed him Citrus County Property Appraiser, a position he held till 2005. In 1993, he became a Homosassa Special Water District Commissioner.

As a legislator, he sponsored four bills in 2008, of which one was signed into law. He was endorsed for re-election by the Florida Chamber of Commerce. He died February 6, 2023 in Tallahassee, FL.

== Sources ==
- Project Vote Smart profile
- Florida House of Representatives Profile
