= List of rallies for the Donald Trump presidential campaign =

List of rallies for the Donald Trump presidential campaign may refer to:

- List of rallies for the 2016 Donald Trump presidential campaign
- List of Donald Trump rallies (December 2016–2022)
- List of rallies for the 2024 Donald Trump presidential campaign
