= Fred Bradley (Kentucky politician) =

American politician (1931–2016)

Majority Whip of the Kentucky Senate
- In office January 8, 1991 – January 1, 1999
- Preceded by: Helen Garrett
- Succeeded by: Walter Blevins

Member of the Kentucky Senate from the 20th district
- In office January 1, 1982 – January 1, 1999
- Preceded by: Tom Easterly
- Succeeded by: Marshall Long

Personal details
- Born: April 26, 1931
- Died: May 20, 2016 (aged 85)
- Party: Democratic

Fred Franklin Bradley (April 26, 1931 – May 20, 2016) was an American politician from Kentucky who was a member of the Kentucky Senate from 1982 to 1999. Bradley was first elected in 1981 after incumbent senator Tom Easterly retired. He did not seek reelection in 1998.

He died in May 2016 at age 85.
