= Carl Selph =

American politician

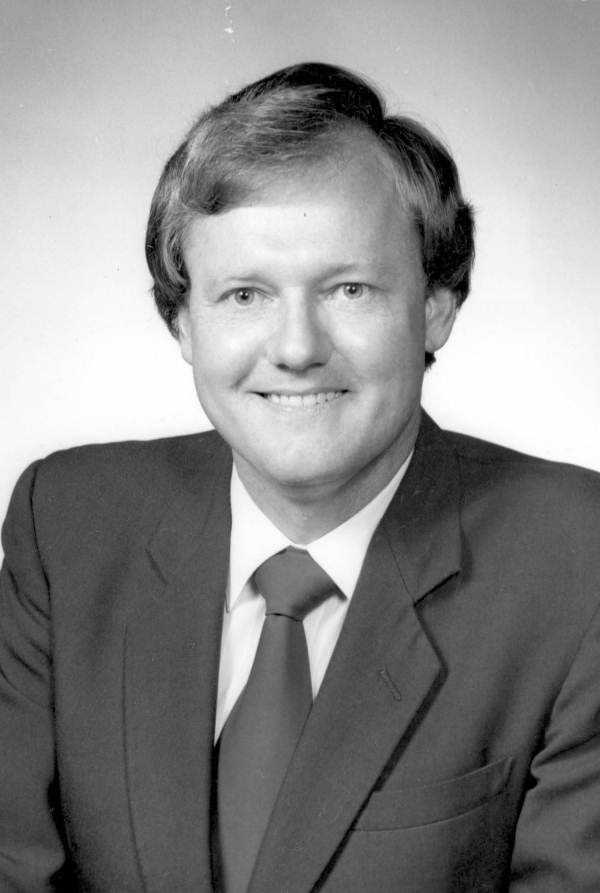

Member of the Florida House of Representatives
- In office 1982–1986

Personal details
- Born: April 2, 1946 (age 80)
- Party: Republican

Carl Selph (born April 2, 1946) was an American politician in the state of Florida.

He served in the Florida House of Representatives for the 34th district from 1982 to 1986, as a Republican. Selph lives in Casselberry, Florida.
