= John R. Culbreath =

American politician

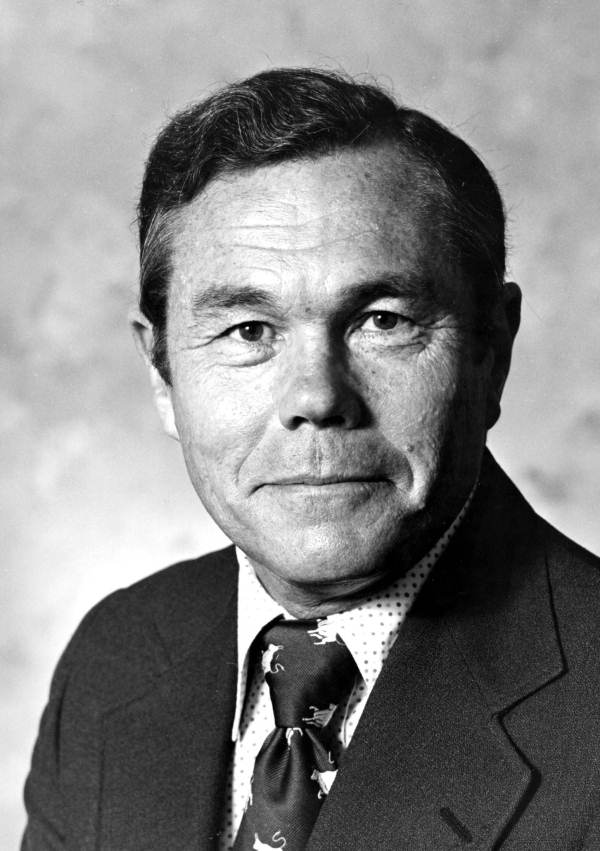
- Culbreath in 1976

Member of the Florida House of Representatives
- In office March 28, 1967 – November 7, 1978
- Preceded by: District established
- Succeeded by: Chuck Smith
- Constituency: 68th district (1967–1972); 36th district (1972–1978)

Personal details
- Born: John Richard Culbreath; June 27, 1926 Tampa, Florida, U.S.
- Died: June 25, 2013 (aged 86) Monticello, Florida, U.S.
- Party: Democratic
- Spouse: Barbara Jean Council
- Children: 4
- Education: University of Georgia

John Richard Culbreath (June 27, 1926 – June 25, 2013) was an American politician. He served as a Democratic member for the 36th and 69th district of the Florida House of Representatives.

Culbreath was born in Tampa, Florida, the son of H. L. Culbreath, and attended Henry B. Plant High School. He then served in the United States Army Air Corps as a flight engineer. After being discharged, he earned a Bachelor of Business Administration degree at the University of Georgia in 1949. He also attended Baylor School.

After college Culbreath went to work for the Firestone Tire and Rubber Company and was made manager of their St. Petersburg store after a year. He left within a year to buy a dairy business. He moved to Brooksville, Florida where he became active in local politics and was president of the international service club Kiwanis and Chairman of the Board of the First National Bank.

In 1967 Culbreath was elected as member for the newly established 69th district of the Florida House of Representatives. In 1972 he moved to the 36th district, where he served until 1978. He then spent 21 years living in Tallahassee, where he worked as a lobbyist, before retiring to a farm in Monticello, Florida.

Culbreath died in June 2013 at his home in Monticello at the age of 83.
