= Henry Baynard =

American politician (1905–1980)

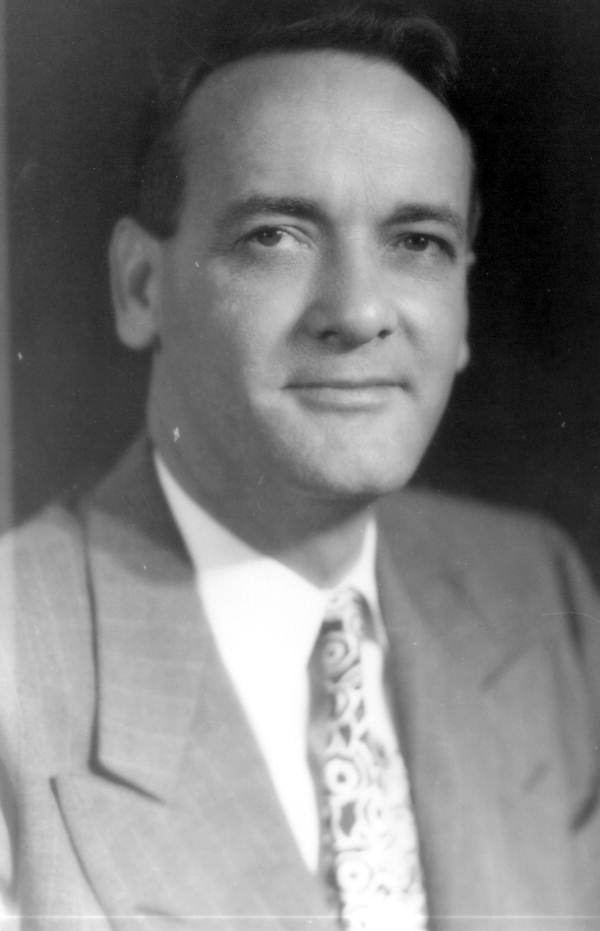
- Baynard in 1947

Member of the Florida Senate from the 11th district
- In office 1945–1951
- Preceded by: John S. Taylor Jr.
- Succeeded by: J. Frank Houghton

Personal details
- Born: Henry Swinton Baynard; January 26, 1905 Mill Spring, North Carolina, U.S.
- Died: January 29, 1980 (aged 75)
- Party: Democratic
- Education: University of Florida

Henry Swinton Baynard (January 26, 1905 – January 29, 1980) was an American politician. He served as a Democratic member for the 11th district of the Florida Senate.

== Life and career ==
Baynard was born in Mill Spring, North Carolina. He attended the University of Florida.

Baynard served in the Florida Senate from 1945 to 1951, representing the 11th district.

Baynard died on January 29, 1980, at the age of 75.
