= Chuck Smith (Florida politician) =

American politician (1928–2021)

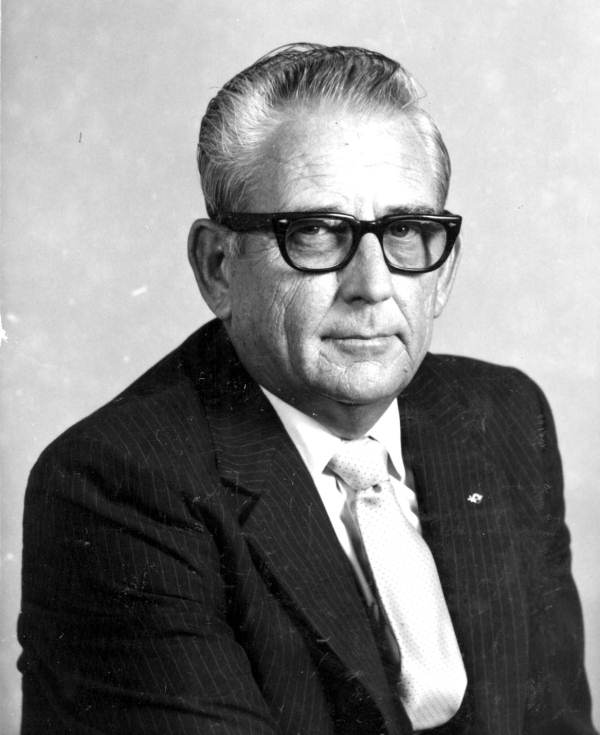

Member of the Florida House of Representatives
- In office November 7, 1978 – November 3, 1992
- Preceded by: John R. Culbreath
- Succeeded by: Jeff Stabins (redistricting)
- Constituency: 36th district (1978–1982); 47th district (1982–1992)

Personal details
- Born: January 20, 1928 Webster, Florida
- Died: January 3, 2021 (aged 92) Brooksville, Florida
- Party: Democratic
- Spouse: Mildred E. Wynns
- Children: 3
- Education: University of Florida (B.S.A.)
- Occupation: Businessman, farmer

Military service
- Allegiance: United States
- Branch/service: United States Air Force
- Years of service: 1946–1949

Charles R. Smith (January 20, 1928 – January 3, 2021) was a Democratic politician from Florida who served as a member of the Florida House of Representatives from 1978 to 1992.

Smith was born in Webster, Florida and attended the University of Florida. He was a businessman. He served as a member of the Hernando County commission from 1966 to 1978 and in the Florida House of Representatives for the 61st district from 1978 to 1992, as a Democrat. He was inducted into the Florida Agriculture Hall of Fame. He died on January 3, 2021.
