= Senator Cowan =

Senator Cowan may refer to:

- Edgar Cowan (1815–1885), U.S. Senator from Pennsylvania from 1861 to 1867
- Jim Cowan (born 1942), Canadian Senator for Nova Scotia from 2005 to 2017
- Mo Cowan (born 1969), U.S. Senator from Massachusetts in 2013
- Thomas F. Cowan (1927–2010), New Jersey State Senate

== See also ==
- Anna Cowin (fl. 1960s–2000s), Florida State Senate
