= Larry Metz =

American politician (born 1955)

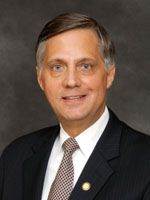

Judge of the Fifth Judicial Circuit Court of Florida
- In office July 1, 2018 – July 15, 2023
- Appointed by: Rick Scott
- Preceded by: William G. Law
- Succeeded by: Timothy McCourt

Member of the Florida House of Representatives
- In office November 2, 2010 – June 30, 2018
- Preceded by: Alan Hays
- Succeeded by: Anthony Sabatini
- Constituency: 25th district (2010–2012); 32nd district (2012–2018)

Member of the Lake County School Board
- In office October 29, 2004 – November 1, 2010; Chairman: 2006–2008
- Appointed by: Jeb Bush

Personal details
- Born: Larry Edward Franz Metz; March 20, 1955 (age 71) Abington, Pennsylvania, U.S.
- Party: Republican
- Spouses: Mariko Metz (m. 1980; div. 2023); Ayumi Metz (m. 2023)
- Children: 2
- Education: University of Florida (BA); Florida State University (JD)

Military service
- Allegiance: United States
- Branch/service: United States Marine Corps
- Years of service: 1976–1980 (Active); 1980–1982 (Reserve)

Larry Edward Franz Metz (born March 20, 1955) is a retired American judge and politician from Florida. He served on the Fifth Judicial Circuit Court from July 1, 2018, until his retirement on July 15, 2023. Previously, he was a Republican member of the Florida House of Representatives from November 2, 2010, until his appointment as a circuit judge in 2018. He was also a member of the Lake County School Board from October 29, 2004, until November 1, 2010, and served on other boards and commissions.

== History ==
Metz was born in Abington, Pennsylvania, and moved to the state of Florida in 1968. After graduating from Northeast High School in 1972, he attended the University of Florida, where he graduated with a bachelor's degree in 1976. Immediately after graduating, he was commissioned as an officer in the United States Marine Corps, serving full-time until 1980.

He was stationed in Japan for his last year of active duty. Following his active-duty tour, Metz served for 2 years in the Marine Corps Reserve, after which he was honorably discharged at the rank of captain. While a Marine, Metz took graduate-level courses in public administration at San Diego State University but did not graduate. In 1980, he was admitted to the Florida State University College of Law, where he received a Juris Doctor with High Honors in 1983. In 1983 he began private practice as an attorney in South Florida, eventually moving to Central Florida and starting Metz Law Firm, P.A., in Lake County in 2007.

In 1992, Metz ran for Congress against incumbent Democrat Congressman Harry Johnston in the newly created 19th District, comprising portions of Broward and Palm Beach counties. Unopposed for the Republican nomination in the heavily Democrat district, he lost to Johnston, receiving 37% of the vote. Metz and his family moved to Yalaha in Lake County in 1997, and he became active in Lake political circles while working for a law firm in Orlando. In 2004, when State Representative Carey Baker opted to run for the Florida Senate rather than seek re-election in the 25th District, (Note: which included large areas of northern and eastern Lake County and smaller areas of northern Seminole and southern Volusia counties) Metz ran to succeed him. He faced Alan Hays, Johnny Barto Smith, Randy Wiseman, and JoAnn Huggins in the Republican primary. Metz lost to Hays, with 29% of the vote to Hays's 35%.

== School Board of Lake County, Florida ==
Following his loss in the 2004 Republican primary for a state representative seat, Metz was appointed to the Lake County School Board by Governor Jeb Bush on October 29, 2004. The appointment filled a vacancy created by the resignation of Dennis Reid. In 2005, Metz was selected as the board's vice chairman.

Metz was elected to a full term on the board in 2006, winning with 54 percent of the vote against challenger Bill Mathias. His tenure involved policy considerations on financial oversight, including the establishment of a citizen audit committee and the development of an internal audit process.

Metz supported a 2006 referendum that changed the Lake County school superintendent position from an elected to an appointed role, a measure that was approved by voters. That same November, he was chosen as board chairman and was re-elected the following year. The board subsequently adopted procedures for hiring an appointed superintendent.

Other matters addressed by the board during this period included managing student overcrowding due to population growth, participation in a school concurrency pilot project, revisions to employee travel rules, and the planning of a medical magnet high school.

During the 2007–2008 academic year, the school district received an "A" grade from the Florida Department of Education and achieved accreditation from the Southern Association of Colleges and Schools.

== Florida House of Representatives ==
Larry Metz was elected to the Florida House of Representatives in the 2010 general election for State House District 25, defeating Democratic nominee Frank Layne Wood. After the 2012 redistricting, the seat was renumbered to House District 32; Metz ran unopposed in the general elections of 2012, 2014, and 2016.

During his tenure in the House, Metz held leadership roles on judiciary- and ethics-related committees. He served on the Judiciary Committee and later chaired subcommittees and committees dealing with civil justice, appropriations for justice-related matters, and public integrity and ethics; contemporaneous reporting and committee records note his role as chair of the Public Integrity & Ethics (PIE) Committee during the 2016–2018 period.

As chair of the PIE Committee, Metz participated in oversight activities that included issuing subpoenas in an inquiry into a Visit Florida media contract; that inquiry produced appellate litigation in which the First District Court of Appeal considered the scope of a legislative subpoena. (Note: Metz v. MAT Media, LLC, 290 So.3d 622 (Fla. 1st DCA 2020))

Metz was identified in contemporaneous sources as a sponsor or House sponsor for multiple bills and legislative measures that became law or were widely reported in the press. He was one of the House sponsors of the Florida Information Protection Act of 2014 (Senate Bill 1524/House sponsor), a data-breach/consumer-privacy statute, and was quoted in press materials supporting the legislation’s expansion of notification duties and penalties for entities that suffer security breaches.

On the admissibility-of-expert-testimony issue, Metz was a legislative sponsor of the 2013 statutory amendments that revised Florida Statutes §90.702 and §90.704 to mirror the federal Daubert standard. (Note: the 2013 Daubert amendments) He presented the related bill in committee and participated in the later judicial rulemaking/advocacy process; the statutory amendments took effect in 2013, and the Florida Supreme Court ultimately adopted the Daubert standard in 2019.

Metz sponsored and carried a number of other bills documented in legislative records and contemporaneous reporting. These include House Bill 1217 in 2018, (Note: the state enactment implementing the Uniform Deployed Parents Custody and Visitation Act, expanding options and protections for deployed service members) which passed both chambers unanimously and was reported in bill analyses and legal/practice reports. He was also involved in House action on civil-asset-forfeiture reform (HB 889/related bills) that moved through the 2016 legislative process with reported sponsorship and negotiations involving Metz and other members.

Metz sponsored legislation reorganizing and reforming special-district law in Florida; (Note: House companion HB 1237, relating to Chapter 189, the Uniform Special District Accountability Act) committee summaries and industry/association reports describe HB 1237's aims to strengthen reporting, oversight, and enforcement for special districts.

On immigration policy, Metz filed and sponsored bills aimed at prohibiting or limiting local "sanctuary" policies during the 2016–2018 period; (Note: for example, HB 697/HB 9 and related filings reported in state media and public-affairs outlets) those measures were widely reported in state news coverage and public-policy analyses.

Metz sponsored several locally requested measures documented in public legislative records and county materials, including HB 41, (Note: "Gabby’s Law for Student Safety") which revised criteria and procedures for identifying hazardous walking conditions for students and appears in the enacted-law summaries and education department bill materials, and earlier proposed measures addressing secondary-metals recycling and metal-theft regulation. (Note: files and local resolutions reference bills filed by Metz)

In addition to statewide legislation, Metz sponsored several local measures. In 2018, he introduced a bill to dissolve the South Lake County Hospital District and eliminate its associated ad valorem property tax. In 2012, he sponsored legislation restructuring the North Lake County Hospital District, modifying its governance framework and reporting requirements.

Metz also sponsored a proposed constitutional amendment to create a homestead tax exemption for first responders who became permanently and totally disabled in the line of duty. Following voter approval of the amendment in 2016, he sponsored the subsequent implementation legislation.

== Judge of the Fifth Judicial Circuit Court of Florida ==
On March 11, 2018, Governor Rick Scott made an unannounced visit to the Florida House of Representatives during the last day of the extended regular session to announce his appointment of Metz to an open judicial seat in the Fifth Judicial Circuit of Florida. The Fifth Circuit consists of Citrus, Hernando, Lake, Marion, and Sumter counties. He assumed office on July 1, 2018, replacing the Honorable William Law. In 2020, Metz was elected without opposition to a full six-year term. His chambers were in the Lake County Courthouse in Tavares. In his first two years on the bench, he presided over civil jury trial cases and domestic cases. Thereafter he presided over criminal felony cases, civil non-jury cases, and probate matters. Metz retired effective July 15, 2023, to spend time with his family and to focus on his health.

At his investiture, Metz spoke of the importance of the rule of law in America. "Our country does value the rule of law, which makes us superior in many ways to other countries that don’t have the rule of law," he said. "People can invest here and know that their property rights are protected by the rule of law, and so is their safety and liberty. It’s so important to have that as the underpinning of society."

== Additional Public Service Roles ==
Metz also served as a member of the Lake County Zoning Board, the Lake-Sumter Metropolitan Planning Organization Governing Board, the Lake County Value Adjustment Board, and the Four Corners Charter School, Inc. Board of Directors. From 2012 to 2018, Metz served as Governor Scott's appointee to the Florida Veterans Hall of Fame Council. In 2015, Governor Scott appointed Metz as one of three commissioners representing Florida at the National Conference of Commissioners on Uniform State Laws, also known as the Uniform Law Commission, a position to which he was reappointed and served until 2023.

== Awards and recognitions ==
Throughout his career in public service, Metz received numerous awards recognizing his legislative work and community involvement. In 2008, he was honored with the Lake County Community Service Award for Leadership for his contributions to civic initiatives in Lake County.

In 2013, Metz received the "Most Valuable Legislator" Award from the Florida Chamber of Commerce, recognizing his support for pro-business legislation. This award was highlighted on the Chamber's website and noted in political reporting.

In 2016, he was named the Lake County Golden Eagle Dinner Honoree by the Central Florida Council of the Boy Scouts of America, acknowledging his community leadership and public service. These honors were referenced in official Florida House records and a retirement announcement by the Florida State Courts.

== Parkinson’s disease ==
Larry Metz publicly disclosed in November 2016 that he had been diagnosed with Parkinson's disease earlier that year at age 61. He revealed this information at the conclusion of an interview with the Florida Supreme Court Judicial Nominating Commission, explaining that he had been aware of the diagnosis for several months and was not taking medication at that time. Metz emphasized that the condition had not interfered with his work and expressed his intention to continue serving despite the diagnosis.

== See also ==
- Florida House of Representatives

== Citations ==
=== References ===
Florida House of Representatives
Preceded by Alan Hays	Member of the Florida House of Representatives from the 25th district 2010–2012	Succeeded by Dave Hood Jr.
Preceded by Steve Crisafulli	Member of the Florida House of Representatives from the 32nd district 2012–2018	Succeeded by Anthony Sabatini
Legal offices
Preceded by William G. Law	Judge of the Fifth Judicial Circuit Court of Florida; 2018–2023	Succeeded by Timothy McCourt
