= Anthony Sabatini =

American politician (born 1988)

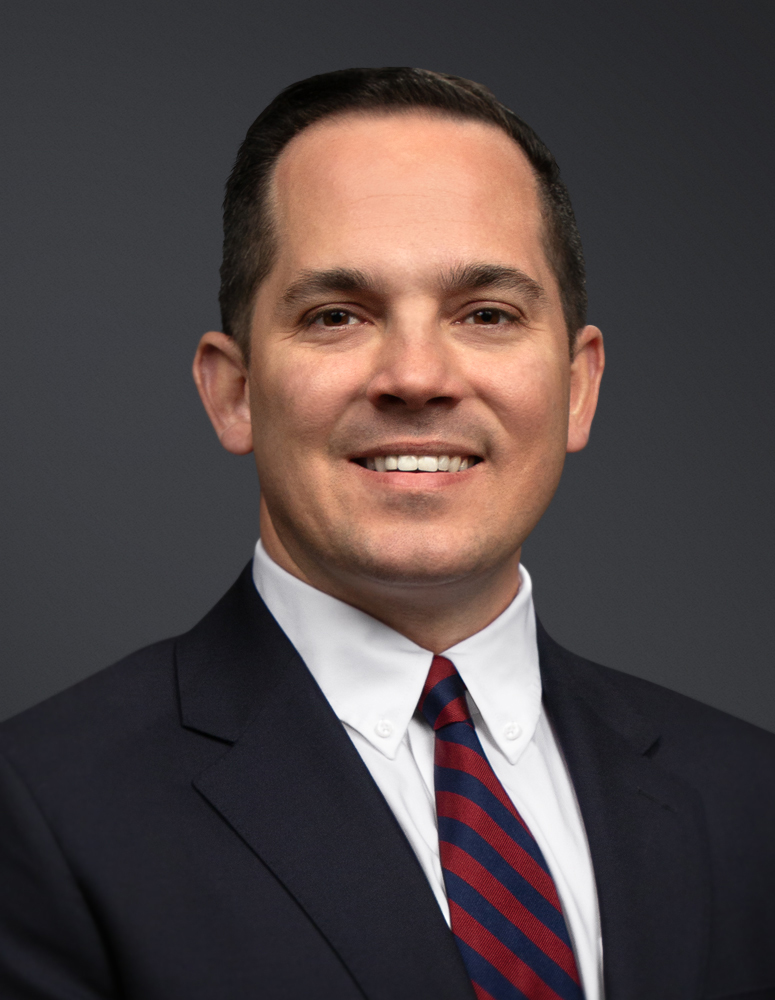
- Official portrait, 2024

Member of the Lake County Commission from the 1st district
- Incumbent
- Assumed office November 12, 2024
- Preceded by: Doug Shields

Member of the Florida House of Representatives from the 32nd district
- In office November 6, 2018 – November 8, 2022
- Preceded by: Larry Metz
- Succeeded by: Thad Altman

Member of the Eustis City Commission from Seat 2
- In office January 1, 2017 – April 30, 2018
- Succeeded by: Michael Holland

Personal details
- Born: Anthony Frank Sabatini; October 20, 1988 (age 38) Smithtown, New York, U.S.
- Party: Republican (2013–present)
- Other political affiliations: Democratic (before 2013)
- Spouse: Francheska Sabatini
- Education: University of Florida (BA, JD)
- Website: Official website

Military service
- Branch/service: United States Army
- Rank: Captain
- Unit: Florida Army National Guard

Anthony Frank Sabatini (born October 20, 1988) is an American far-right politician, attorney, and Florida Army National Guard officer serving as a Lake County commissioner since 2024. A member of the Republican Party, he previously served in the Florida House of Representatives from 2018 to 2022. Once a strong supporter of President Donald Trump, Sabatini has been a critic of Donald Trump since his endorsement of Daniel Webster over himself in 2024.

A native of New York, Sabatini graduated from the University of Florida with a bachelor's degree and received his Juris Doctor from the Levin College of Law in 2017. While in law school, Sabatini was elected to the city commission of Eustis, Florida in 2016; serving until his resignation to run for the Florida House of Representatives in 2018. In 2022, he was an unsuccessful candidate in Florida's 7th congressional district Republican primary, losing to Cory Mills. In 2024, Sabatini was an unsuccessful candidate for Florida's 11th congressional district, withdrawing his candidacy after President Trump endorsed his opponent. That same day, he filed to run for Lake County Commission.

In August 2024, Sabatini narrowly defeated incumbent Republican Doug Shields in the Lake County Commission's 1st district election. In November 2024, he considered running for Florida's 6th congressional district in the 2025 special election until President Trump endorsed state senator Randy Fine. Later that month, Sabatini reaffirmed his intention to run for Congress in the future. He ran as a candidate for Florida's 11th congressional district again in 2026, but suspended his campaign before the Republican primary.

Sabatini has espoused a variety of right-wing stances, including opposition to abortion, gun control, DEI, and LGBTQ rights. His more controversial views include his support for Francisco Franco and Christian nationalism, his promotion of climate change denial and false claims of electoral fraud in 2020, and his opposition to vaccination.

== Early life and education ==
Sabatini was born in Smithtown, New York, in 1988 and moved with his family to Florida the following year. In a high school photo, Sabatini and a friend were pictured in blackface. In his freshman year of college, he was photographed in brownface. He earned bachelor's degrees in philosophy and history from the University of Florida in 2012 and a Juris Doctor from the University of Florida Fredric G. Levin College of Law in 2017.

In 2023, The Daily Beast revealed Sabatini plagiarized his undergraduate thesis, copying many statements from Wikipedia.

== Career ==
Sabatini is an infantry officer in the Florida Army National Guard. He was appointed to the City of Eustis Code Enforcement Board and later elected to the Eustis City Commission in 2016 and resigned from the office on April 30, 2018, to focus on his campaign for the Florida House of Representatives.

=== Florida House of Representatives (2018–2022) ===
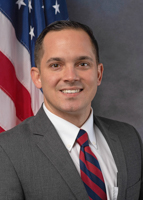
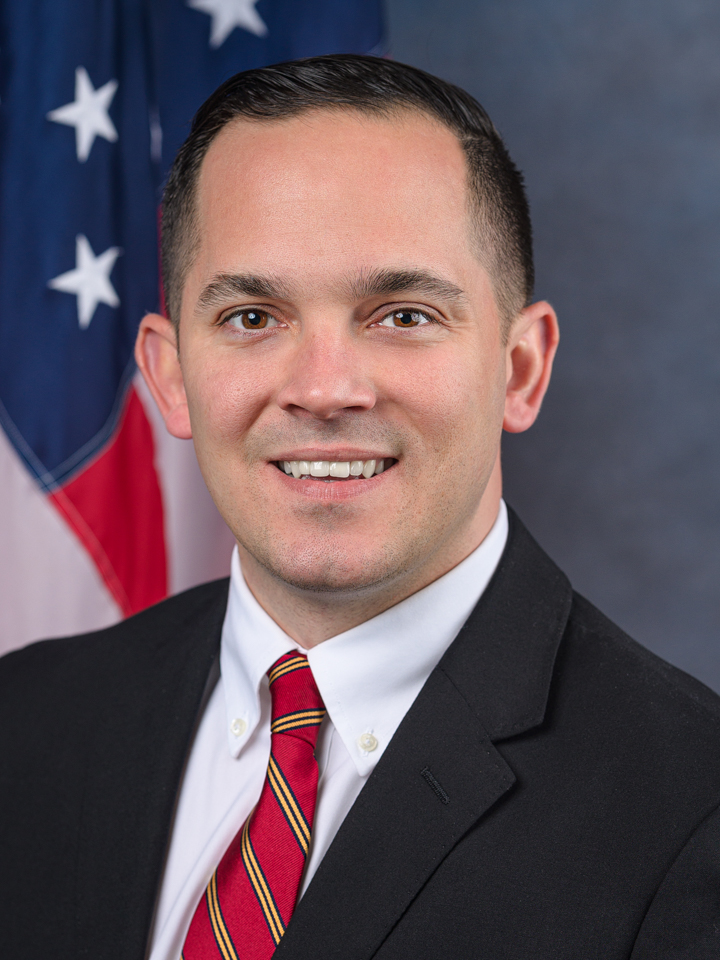
Sabatini's official portraits during his first (left) and second (right) terms in the Florida legislature

Sabatini defeated Monica Wofford and Shannon Elswick, to win the August 28, 2018 Republican primary, winning 46.7% of the vote. In the November 6, 2018 general election, Sabatini defeated Democrat Cynthia Brown, taking 56.48% of the vote.

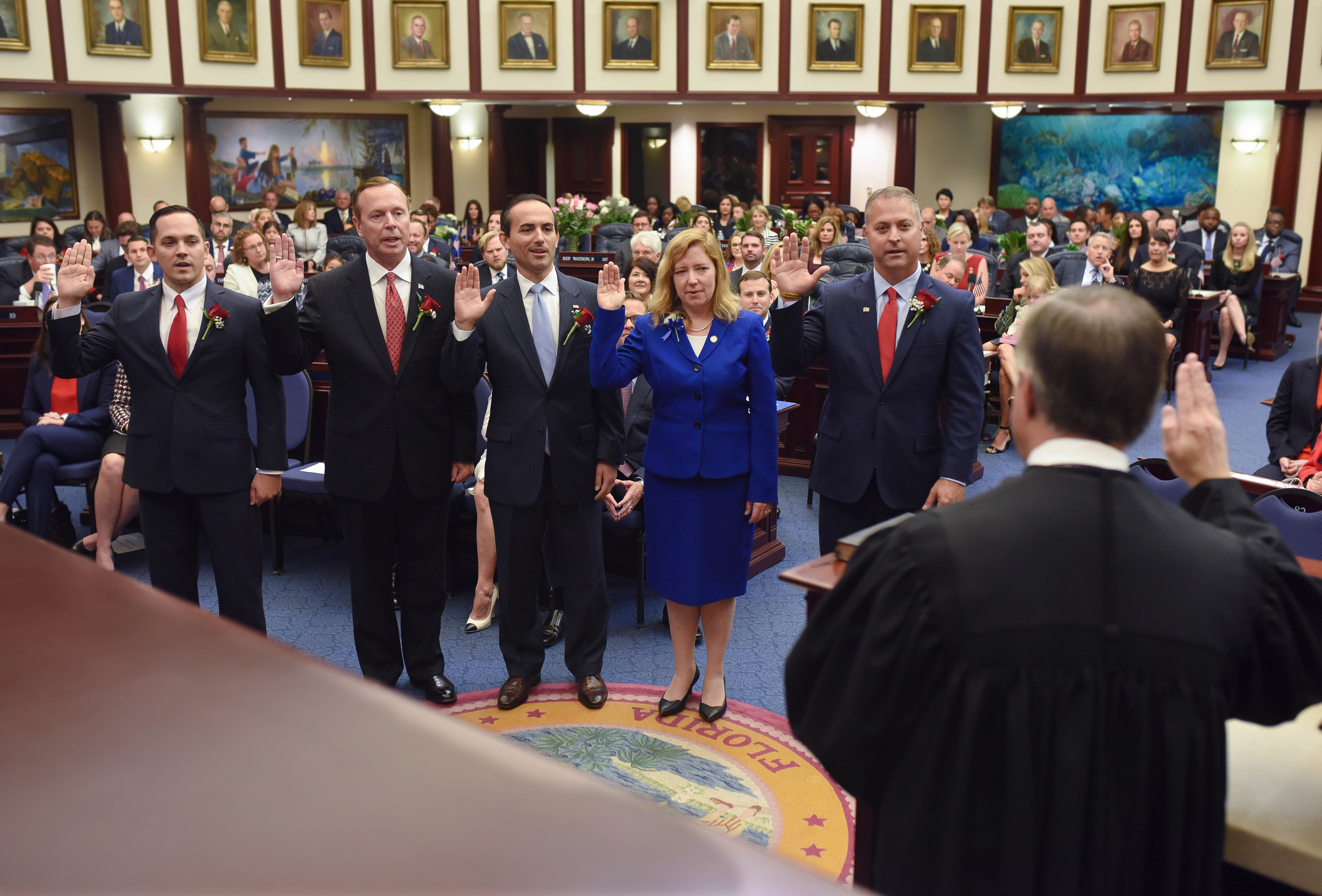
Sabatini being sworn in as a Florida state representative, November 2018

In 2019, Sabatini proposed amendments to make the Swamp Restaurant in Gainesville a landmark to protect it from demolition. The restaurant was temporarily closed, but not demolished, and eventually returned.

On January 13, 2020, Sabatini introduced HB 1365, which would have made it a felony for doctors to provide hormone therapy or gender reassignment surgery for transgender minors.

In 2020, Sabatini introduced legislation allowing Floridians with valid concealed carry licensed to carry firearms on public colleges and universities.

Sabatini has sponsored legislation to enshrine eight-year term limits for Florida's school boards.

Sabatini has introduced legislation to ban red light cameras in Florida.

During his tenure in the House, the Orlando Sentinel described Sabatini as "the worst person in the Florida Legislature."

In 2021, he became a fellow of the Claremont Institute.

In 2021, Sabatino was one of a small number of politicians to defend then-U.S. Representative Matt Gaetz when Gaetz was under investigation for alleged child sex trafficking.

=== 2022 U.S. House campaign ===
On March 8, 2021, Sabatini announced that he would challenge incumbent Republican representative Daniel Webster for Florida's 11th congressional district. He later suggested he might not wind up running against Webster due to redistricting. On June 7, 2021, he announced he would challenge incumbent Democratic representative Stephanie Murphy for Florida's 7th congressional district due to redistricting.

In August 2022, Sabatini lost the Republican primary to businessman Cory Mills.

=== 2024 U.S House campaign ===
In April 2023, Sabatini declared his candidacy for the U.S House of Representatives, again challenging incumbent Daniel Webster for the Republican nomination for Florida's 11th congressional district. During the campaign, Sabatini characterized Webster as "senile" and accused him of being a "RINO".

In June 2024, Sabatini withdrew from the race after President Trump endorsed Webster.

=== Lake County Republican Party (2022–2024) ===
In December 2022, Sabatini was elected chair of the Lake County Republican Party.

In December 2024, Sabatini stepped down as county party chair and endorsed Carey Baker for the position, who was defeated by Taylor Yarkosky. In February 2025, Sabatini criticized Yarkosky's leadership and called for a new county party chair.

In August 2025, Sabatini filed a lawsuit, on behalf of precinct committeewoman Autumn Jacunski, which alleged Jacunski was "physically battered" by county party vice chair Mike Trainor during an event attended by Lieutenant Governor Jay Collins, claiming her hand was intentionally slammed in a door. Shortly after, a three-minute video of the event was released showing Sabatini sent Jacunski into the building to inform attendees he was barred from entry, saying:

Go in there and tell every single fucking person that this meeting needs to end right now ... Do not let them call this meeting because these three people said they are going to arrest me and throw me in jail, a sitting County Commissioner, if I walk in the building.

Later in the video, Jacunski approached the entrance and became "confrontational" with Trainor. When the door was shut, Trainor was not looking at the door; Jacunski appeared unhurt and walked away from the entrance. Police were called to investigate, but no arrests were made. In a statement to the press, State Attorney Bill Gladson responded to the event, saying: "prosecution is extremely unlikely" and "this whole situation could have been avoided if those involved would have just acted like adults instead of children. Everyone should be embarrassed. Lake County deserves better."

=== Lake County Commission (2024–present) ===
Less than one hour after withdrawing his second candidacy for Congress, Sabatini announced his candidacy for the Lake County Commission. In August 2024, he was elected to the Lake County Commission, narrowly defeating incumbent Republican Doug Shields. On November 12, Sabatini was formally sworn into office.

As county commissioner, Sabatini has proposed renaming a road in his district after Charlie Kirk, following his assassination.

=== City attorney of Treasure Island (2025–present) ===
In May 2025, Sabatini lost his bid to become city attorney of Milton, Florida in Santa Rosa County. On May 14, he was chosen as city attorney of Treasure Island, Florida in Pinellas County, succeeding Jennifer Cowan.

== Political positions ==
Sabatini is currently a member of the Republican Party. He was previously a registered member of the Democratic Party.

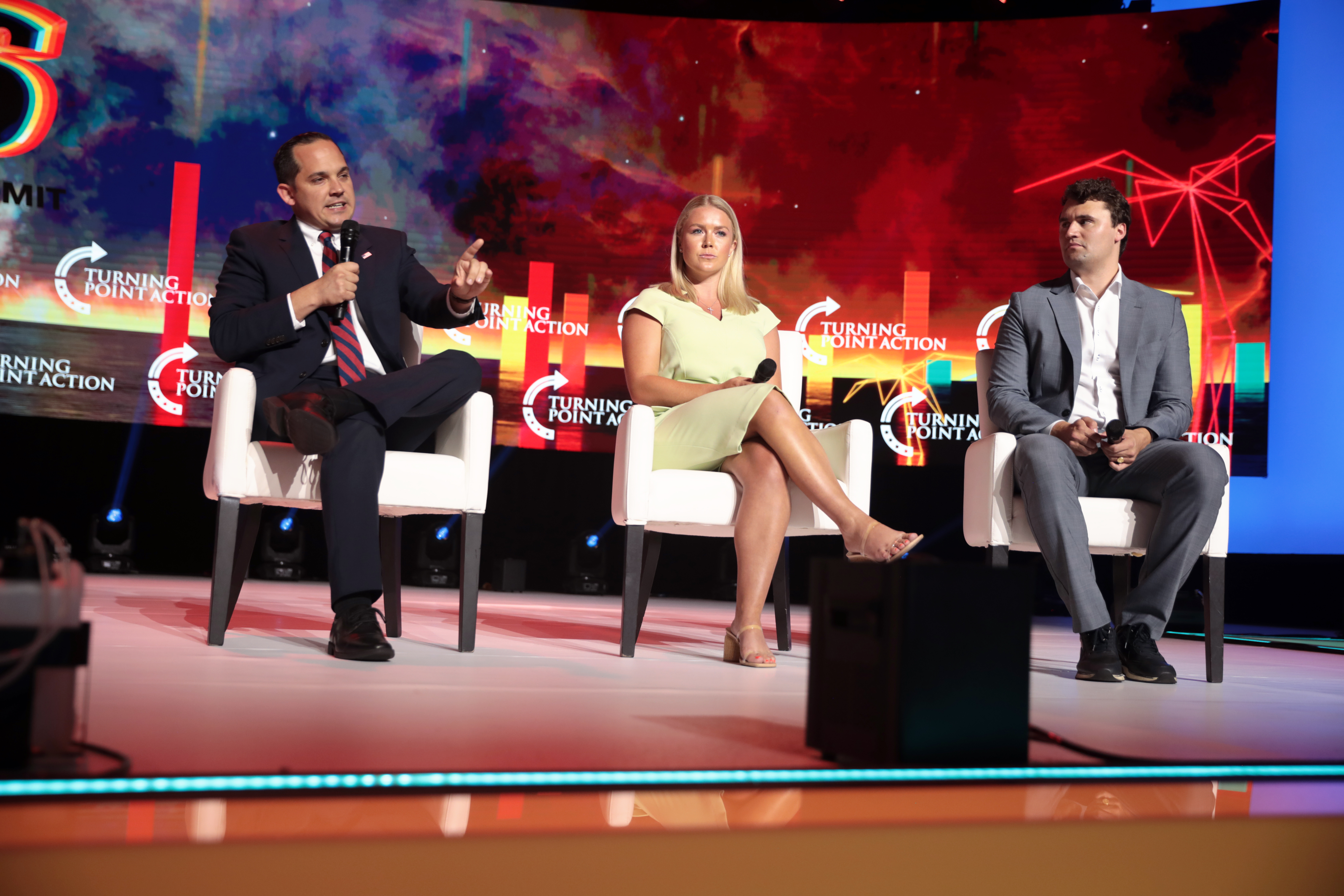
Sabatini, Karoline Leavitt, and Charlie Kirk speaking with attendees at the Tampa Convention Center, 2022

=== Abortion rights ===
Sabatini is anti-abortion, calling for an "abortion ban" from conception.

=== Climate change ===
Sabatini rejects the scientific consensus on climate change. In 2024, he called for the execution of two climate change activists, who were arrested after throwing paint at glass encasements which contained the Declaration of Independence and the U.S. Constitution.

=== Gun control ===
Sabatini has opposed gun control in the United States and has supported unrestricted carry legislation to allow Floridians to carry concealed firearms without first acquiring a permit. Sabatini described permit requirements as a requirement for persons "to beg government permission and pay money for the exercise of their fundamental God-given right." Sabatini introduced constitutional carry legislation in 2020, 2021, and 2022; the legislation was endorsed by Republican governor Ron DeSantis but did not pass the Republican-controlled legislature; Sabatini criticized several fellow Republicans for failing to back the bill.

=== LGBTQ+ rights ===
Sabatini is opposed to same-sex marriage, LGBTQ rights, and transgender rights in the United States. He has referred to LGBTQ pride as "anti-Christian" and called to "crush" Pride month for being "anti-American."

=== Christian nationalism ===
Sabatini is self-described Christian nationalist. He has spoken at multiple rallies to "spread Christian nationalism" alongside General Mike Flynn. In 2022, Sabatini posted on Facebook: "only when Christians stand up & get loud, will we take this country back."

=== DEI ===
Sabatini is opposed to diversity, equity, and inclusion. Following the fatal Francis Scott Key Bridge collapse, Sabatini tweeted "DEI did this". His remarks were characterized as racist by the press and state senator Shevrin Jones quote-tweeted Sabatini, saying: "I guess DEI is the new 'N' word".

=== Immigration ===
Sabatini has called to ban all immigration to the United States except from Italy.

=== Cannabis ===
In 2019, Sabatini was the lone Republican co-sponsor of a bill that would legalize the recreational use of cannabis in Florida for residents aged 21 and older.

=== "Cancel culture" and the media ===
Sabatini has made multiple critical statements of "cancel culture", tweeting that, "If Socrates was out philosophizing in American society today, he would be cancelled real quick". He has called for repealing Section 230 of the Communications Decency Act, arguing that it allows online platforms to remove conservative perspectives.

=== Donald Trump ===
Sabatini has proposed renaming the Florida section of U.S. Route 27 the "President Donald J. Trump Highway". During Trump's reelection bid announcement in Orlando on June 18, 2019, a rally goer attacked an Orlando Sentinel reporter filming the event. The reporter tweeted the encounter, to which Sabatini replied "MAGA," for which he was again criticized for supporting violence.

Sabatini has repeatedly supported Republican attempts to overturn the 2020 presidential election, which Trump lost to Democrat Joe Biden. He has repeated disputed conspiracy theories about the election, and has called for audits of the results in Hillsborough County, Miami-Dade County, Broward County, Palm Beach County, and Orange County.

Following the FBI's August 2022 search of Mar-a-Lago, Sabatini said Florida should "sever all ties with DOJ immediately" and added that "any FBI agent conducting law enforcement functions outside the purview of our State should be arrested upon sight".

After President Trump endorsed Sabatini's primary opponent in 2024, Sabatini has been a critic of Donald Trump.

=== COVID-19 ===
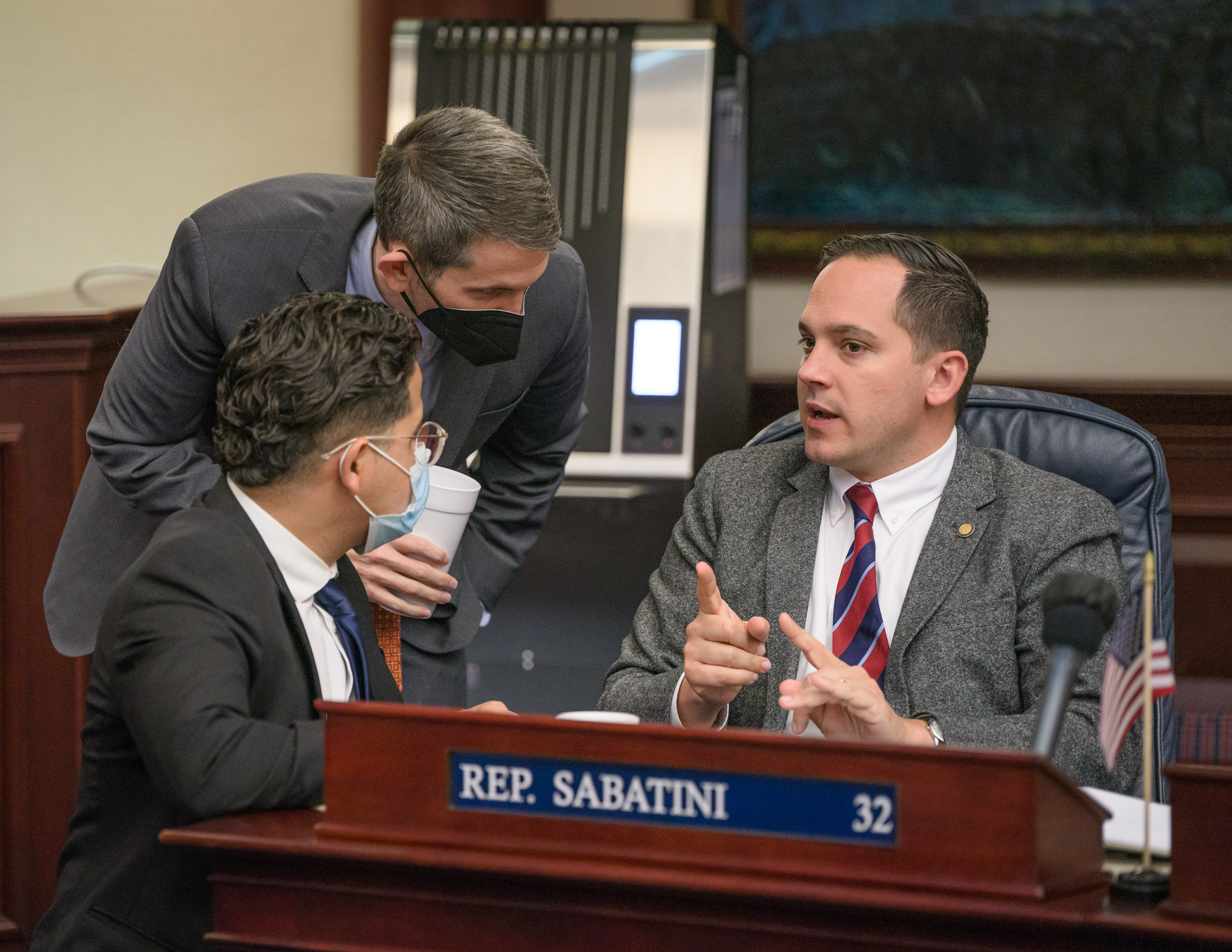
Sabatini on the House floor during the COVID-19 pandemic, April 2021

In July 2020, a Florida resident filed an ethics complaint against Sabatini in connection with his involvement in several mask mandate lawsuits. The complaint was in response to a press release about the lawsuit that printed Sabatini's official House email address as the press contact and alleged that this violates a Florida State Statute about misuse of public position.

Sabatini has filed at least 14 lawsuits during the COVID-19 pandemic challenging local ordinances requiring the use of face coverings. On September 2, 2020, he received his sixth loss from the filed suits that have so far been heard.

=== Vaccination policy ===
In September 2025, Sabatini called to abolish all vaccine mandates in Florida.

=== Black Lives Matter protests ===
In response to the protests following the murder of George Floyd, Sabatini posted a tweet that suggested that protesters who unlawfully enter businesses would be met with an AR-15 rifle; he posted a similar suggestion on his Facebook page with the caption "Don't Tread on Me". The sentiment was widely condemned, with Florida State Representative Cindy Polo deriding it as "clearly inflammatory" and "inciting violence". Nikki Fried, Florida Agriculture Commissioner, called for Sabatini to be reprimanded. House Speaker José Oliva found no "direct or preemptive threat" in Sabatini's comments and did not take punitive actions. Sabatini also drew criticism from Florida state senator Shevrin Jones for referring to Black Lives Matter protesters in Minneapolis as "disgusting, lawless thugs" in a tweet calling for their arrest, prosecution, and imprisonment.

During the trial of Kyle Rittenhouse, following the shooting and death of three men in Kenosha, WI, Sabatini tweeted "KYLE RITTENHOUSE FOR CONGRESS."

=== Confederate statues ===
In 2017, Sabatini wrote an open letter as city commissioner, saying: "to any cities or counties that would like to donate their Confederate monuments to the City of Eustis, we will gladly accept and proudly display our nation's history." In 2019, Sabatini supported the relocation of a Confederate statue from Washington, D.C. to Tavares, Florida.

=== Law enforcement ===
In 2022, Sabatini called to defund the Federal Bureau of Investigation, saying: "I think every single candidate and elected official in the GOP right now needs to go on record pledging to defund these lawless agencies."

=== Supreme Court ===
Sabatini criticized President Joe Biden's pledge to nominate a Black woman to the U.S. Supreme Court following Justice Stephen Breyer's announcement that he would retire, tweeting, "Biden MUST be impeached for his anti-white racist exclusion of any white nominee to the Supreme Court".

=== Francisco Franco ===
In 2022, Sabatini quoted Spanish dictator Francisco Franco on Twitter, tweeting that “I answer only to God and to History.” In response to criticism of Sabatini's tweet, Sabatini posted a picture of Franco with President Dwight Eisenhower and stated that critics of his tweet were "extremely un-American."

=== Misinformation ===
Following the attack on Paul Pelosi, The New York Times accused Sabatini of spreading misinformation when he suggested that the Pelosi family was hiding vital information about the attack.

== Electoral history ==
2016 Eustis City Commission Seat 2
Party	Candidate	Votes	%
Nonpartisan	Anthony Sabatini	3,414	46.1
Nonpartisan	Brandon Avallone	1,186	16
Nonpartisan	Michael Strong	2,804	37.8
Total votes		7,404	

2018 Florida House of Representatives 32nd district Republican primary
Party	Candidate	Votes	%
Republican	Anthony Sabatini	8,278	46.7
Republican	Shannon Elswick	5,170	29.2
Republican	Monica Wofford	4,276	24.1
Total votes		17,724	100.00

2018 Florida House of Representatives 32nd district
Party	Candidate	Votes	%	±%
Republican	Anthony Sabatini	46,446	56.5	
Democratic	Cynthia Brown	35,784	43.5	

2020 Florida House of Representatives 32nd district
Party	Candidate	Votes	%	±%
Republican	Anthony Sabatini	63,164	55.7	
Democratic	Stephanie Dukes	50,226	44.3	

2022 Florida's 7th Congressional District Republican primary
Party	Candidate	Votes	%
Republican	Cory Mills	27,452	38.1%
Republican	Anthony Sabatini	17,059	23.6%
Republican	Brady Duke	11,010	15.3%
Republican	Ted Edwards	4,197	5.8%
Republican	Russell Roberts	3,970	5.5%
Republican	Erika Benfield	3,912	5.4%
Republican	Scott Sturgill	3,055	4.2%
Republican	Al Santos	1,480	2.1%

== Personal life ==
Sabatini is Italian Catholic. He is married to his wife Francheska, who unsuccessfully ran for county judge in 2024. They live in Lake County, Florida.

== See also ==
- Michelle Salzman
- Cory Mills
- Webster Barnaby
