= Senator Houghton =

Senator Houghton may refer to:

- Horace E. Houghton (1835–1897), Washington State Senate
- J. Frank Houghton (1893–1968), Florida State Senate
