= Darryl Block =

American politician

- Official portrait, 2026

Member of the Florida House of Representatives from the 36th district
- Incumbent
- Assumed office November 3, 2026
- Preceded by: Rachel Plakon

Personal details
- Party: Democratic
- Education: University of South Florida (BSW); Florida State University (MSW); Barry University (JD)

Darryl Charles Block (born October 22, 1980) is an American politician who has served as a member of the Florida House of Representatives for the 36th district since 2026.

== Education ==
Block earned a Bachelor of Social Work degree from University of South Florida, a Master of Social Work degree from Florida State University, and a Juris Doctor from Barry University. Prior to being elected to the Florida House of Representatives, Block worked as a mediator and attorney.

== Early political career ==
Prior to his election to the state legislature, Block was active in local Democratic politics. He previously ran for the Florida House of Representatives in 2018, seeking the nomination for District 29 (which covered similar areas of Seminole County prior to redistricting), where he competed in the Democratic primary, but failed to secure the nomination.

== Florida House of Representatives ==
=== 2026 Election ===
Block ran for the Florida House of Representatives to represent District 36 in 2026. He advanced automatically from the Democratic primary as the sole candidate.

In the general election on November 3, 2026, Block defeated the Republican incumbent, Rachel Plakon, with 54.7% of the vote.

=== Tenure ===
Block assumed office on November 3, 2026.

== Personal life ==
Block is married to Melanie Block, and they live in Sanford, Florida.

== Electoral history ==
Florida District 36 House of Representatives Election, 2026
Party	Candidate	Votes	%
Democratic	Darryl Block	37,855	54.7
Republican	Rachel Plakon	31,390	45.3
Total votes		69,245	100.0
