= Weeks Hardware =

Hardware store in Florida

Coordinates: 28.555999°N 82.388159°W

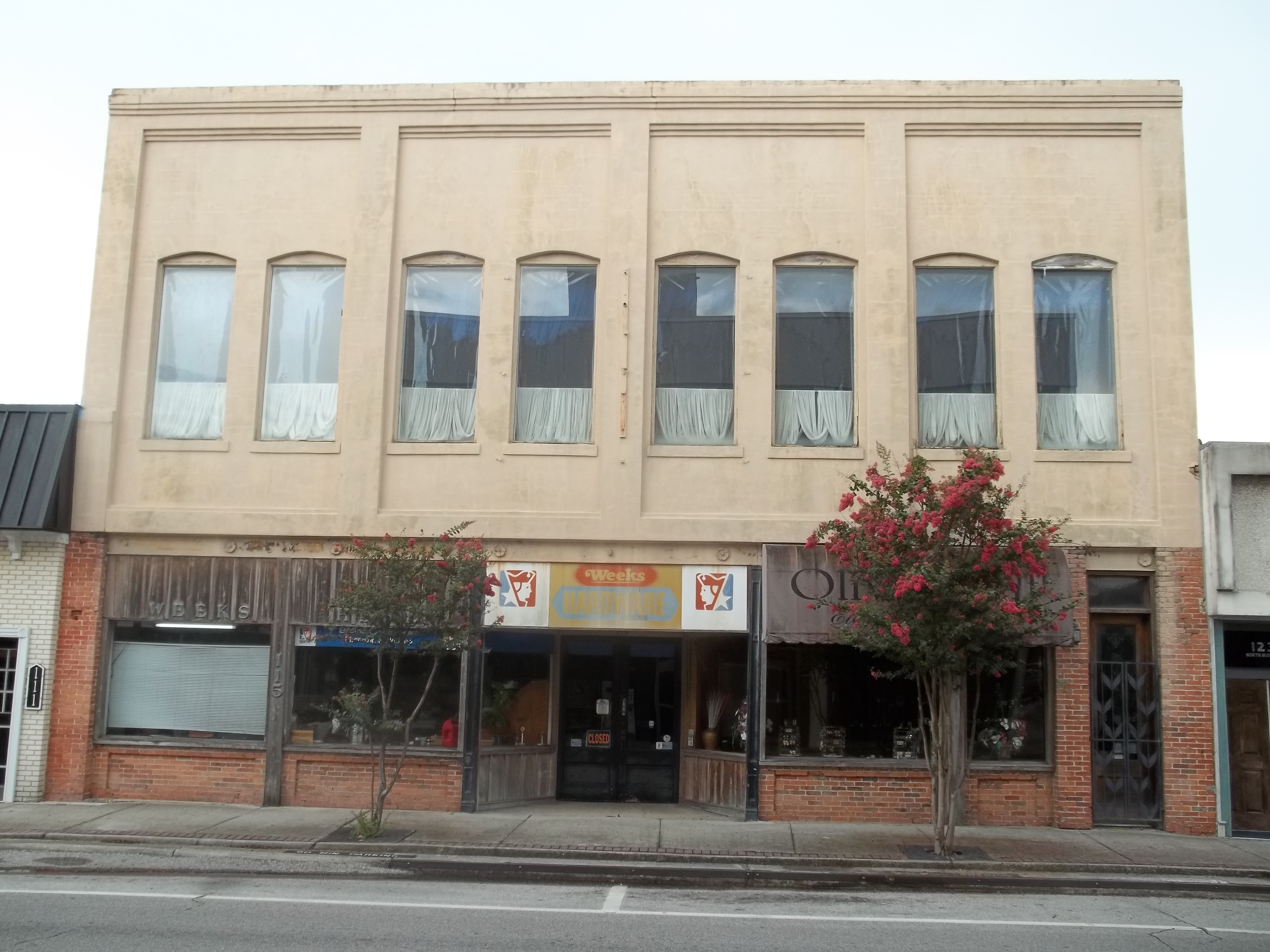
Weeks Hardware building in Brooksville, Florida

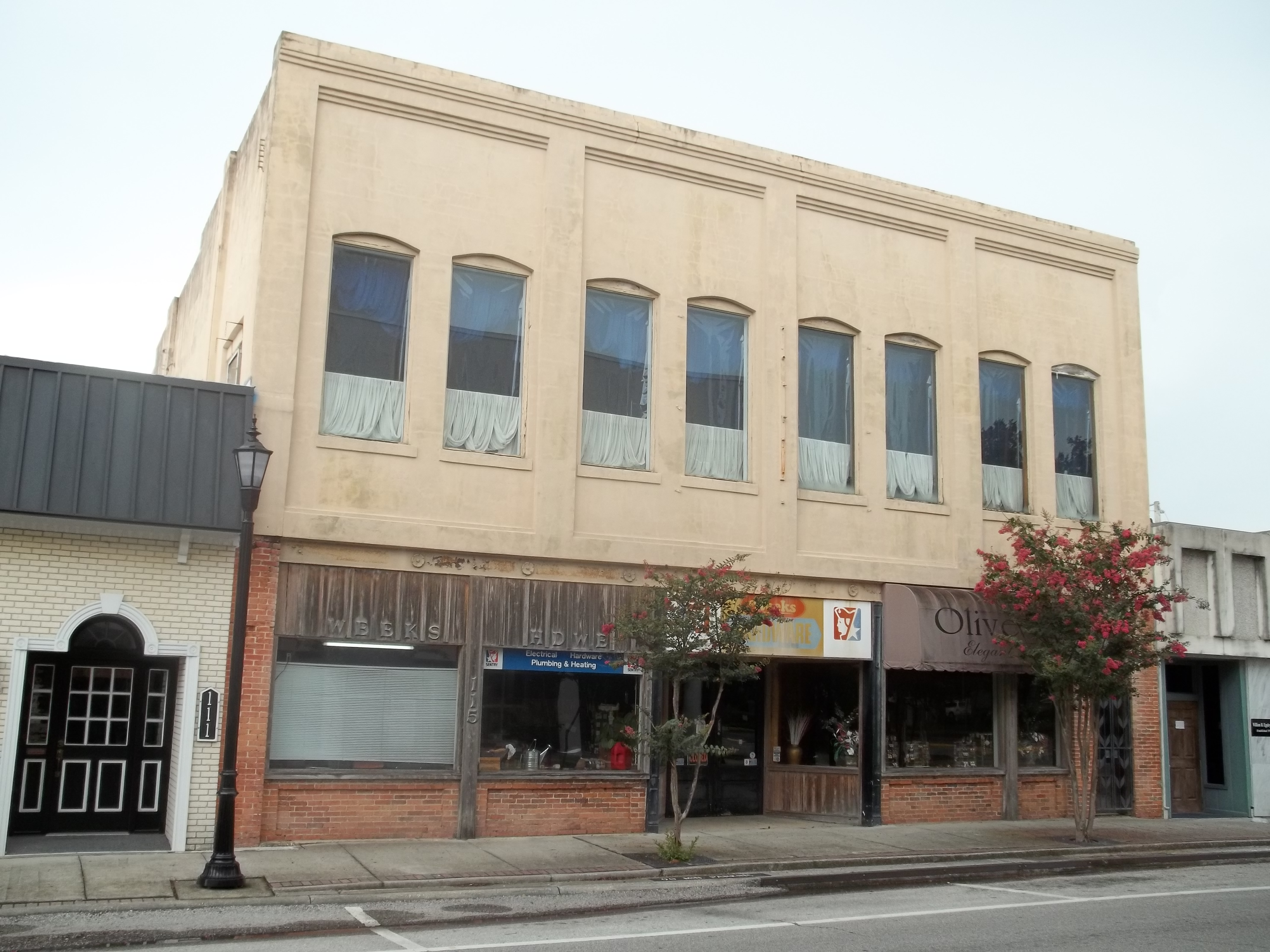
Weeks Hardware building in Brooksville, Florida

Weeks Hardware is a historic two-story brick 1913 hardware store building in Brooksville, Florida, located at 115 North Main Street.

The store was called Miro Hardware through the end of World War II, as a combination of the first names of Rosie and Mammie Weeks.

As of 2003, the store was the "oldest active business in town," according to the St. Petersburg Times, which added:

The reluctance to modernize is evident everywhere. The ceiling is high, made of elaborately patterned tin and in need of paint. The freight elevator in the back of the store is powered by hand.

A tall, darkly stained plywood case that holds bolts and screws in its dozens of drawers, was built, according to a little brass label on one corner, by A.R. Brown on May 7, 1901.

The founder's grandson, Joseph C. Weeks, worked in the store since childhood, and took over the business after returning from naval service and graduating from the University of Florida. Mr. Weeks, aged 82, was honored by the Brooksville City Council as "the 2009 Great Brooksvillian."

The building was owned by John Weeks, the first President of the First Federal Bank.

The historic J.M. Rogers Department Store built in 1912 is located across the street at 120 North Main Street.

== Weeks House ==
The Weeks House is a historic home at 118 South Brooksville Avenue. It was built circa 1900 and was the original home of the founder of Weeks Hardware.

== Old Weeks House ==
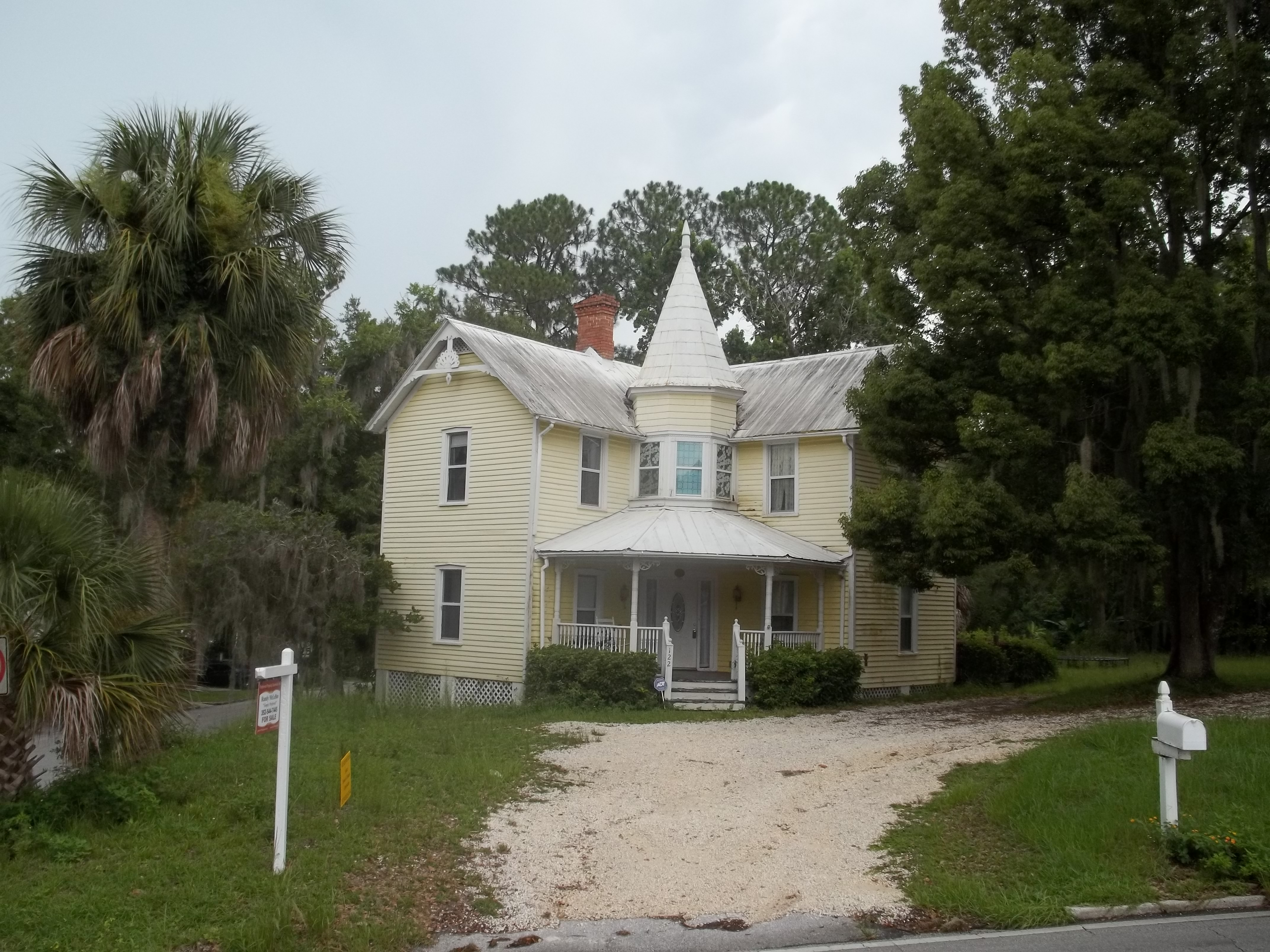
Old Weeks House

The Old Weeks House is a historic residence at 122 West Fort Dade Road. It was built by sawmill owner G. Gordy in 1882 using heart of pine. The Weeks family owned the house from the 1930s until the 1970s. It belonged to Joe Weeks' uncle and his cousin. It is reputed to be haunted.
