= Mike Fasano =

American politician

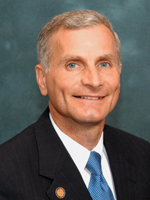

Member of the Florida House of Representatives from the 36th district
- In office 2012–2013
- Succeeded by: Amanda Murphy

Member of the Florida Senate
- In office 2002–2012

President Pro Tempore of the Florida Senate
- In office 2008–2010

Member of the Florida House of Representatives from the 45th district
- In office 1994–2002

Majority Leader of the Florida House of Representatives
- In office 2000–2001

Personal details
- Born: June 11, 1958 (age 68) Long Island, New York, U.S.
- Party: Republican

Mike Fasano is the Tax Collector of Pasco County, Florida. Previously he was a member of the Florida House, representing the 36th District since 2012, a member of the Florida Senate from 2002 through 2012 and a member of the Florida House of Representatives from 1994 through 2002. He is a Republican.

== Career ==
Fasano was elected to the Florida House of Representatives in November 1994. Within the House, he was a Majority Whip from 1996 to 1998, the Majority Floor Leader from 1998 to 2000 and the House Majority Leader from 2000 to 2001.

Fasano was first elected to the Florida Senate in November 2002 and subsequently re-elected in 2004 and 2008. From 2008 through 2010, Fasano served as President Pro Tempore of the Florida Senate. He represented Senate District 11, which encompassed western parts of Citrus, Hernando, and Pasco counties, and northern Pinellas county.

Fasano served as Majority Whip under the leadership of Senate Majority Leader Dan Webster. His other Senate Committee Memberships have included: Communications and Public Utilities; Fiscal Policy and Calendar; Health Regulation; Judiciary; Regulated Industries; Rules; and the Joint Legislative Budget Commission. For several years within the Senate, Fasano served as the Chairman of the Transportation and Economic Development Appropriations Committee, where he oversaw a budget of about 12 billion dollars.

From 2010 to 2012, Fasano served as chair of the Budget Subcommittee on Criminal and Civil Justice Appropriations. He also served on many other committees in the Florida Senate including: Banking and Insurance; Budget; Budget Subcommittee on Transportation, Tourism, and Economic Development Appropriations; Communications, Energy, and Public Utilities; Governmental Oversight and Accountability; and Health Regulation.

Once again in the Florida House, Fasano served as chair of the Joint Administrative Procedures Committee. He also served on many other committees in the Florida House including: Health & Human Services; Health Care Appropriations Subcommittee; Higher Education & Workforce Subcommittee; State Affairs Committee; and Transportation & Economic Development Appropriations Subcommittee.

== Personal life ==
Fasano's father, Alexander, was a meat-cutter in Long Island, New York. His mother, Joan, was an English war bride. Fasano was the youngest of five children.

In 1971, when Fasano was 13, his father was diagnosed with cancer. Hoping warm winters would ease his suffering, the family moved to Pasco County, Florida.

== 2008 election ==
On November 4, 2008, he was re-elected to the Florida Senate. This was his final term in the Florida Senate and served in the Senate until 2012.

=== 2008 election: results by county ===
County	Mike Fasano (REP)	Fred Taylor(DEM)
Citrus	3,393	1,817
Hernando	23,348	14,261
Pasco	62,924	31,112
Pinellas	51,475	28,924
Total	141,140	76,114
% Votes	65.0%	35.0%

Source: Florida Department of State, Division of Elections

== 2009 legislative session ==
After the 2008 election, Fasano was elected by his fellow senators to serve as President Pro Tempore of the Florida Senate. The appointment made him top chief to then Senate President Jeff Atwater.

== 2012 legislative session ==
During the 2012 legislative session, Fasano was removed from his chairmanship of the Budget Subcommittee on Criminal and Civil Justice Appropriations for his opposition to a plan to privatize at least 27 prisons in South Florida and turn them over to for-profit companies. Passage of the plan was a major goal of Governor Rick Scott and then Senate President Mike Haridopolos.

After being removed from the committee, Fasano stated: "We're not going to give up the fight. We're certainly going to stand with our principles. We're certainly going to make our voice heard on behalf of our constituents, saying what the governor (Scott) and he (Haridopolos) want to do in privatizing 18 counties and 27 prison facilities is the wrong direction and bad for the taxpayers of Florida."

The prison privatization plan was defeated in the Florida Senate by a 19-21 vote, with Fasano voting against the plan.

Source: Sen. Fasano Stripped of Chairmanship after Speaking Against Prison Plan

Source: Florida Senate defeats prison privatization bill

== Pasco County tax collector ==
On August 7, 2013, Representative Fasano was appointed to the position of Pasco County's Tax Collector by Florida Governor Rick Scott.

== Biden endorsement ==
In October 2020, he appeared in an advertisement headlined, "I Love My Party But I Love My Country More", endorsing Joe Biden for President of the United States, calling himself "a Reagan Republican" and "in 2020, I'm a Biden Republican", and proclaiming Donald Trump "a global embarrassment."

Florida House of Representatives
Preceded by John Long	Member of the Florida House of Representatives from the 45th district 1994–2002	Succeeded by Thomas "Tom" Anderson
Preceded by Scott Randolph	Member of the Florida House of Representatives from the 36th district 2012–2013	Succeeded by Amanda Murphy
Preceded by Jim King	Majority Leader of the Florida House of Representatives; 2000–2001	Succeeded by Jerry Maygarden
Florida Senate
Preceded by Anna Cowin	Member of the Florida Senate from the 11th district 2002–2012	Succeeded by Alan Hays
Preceded by J. D. Alexander	Majority Whip of the Florida Senate; 2006–2008	Succeeded by Charles Dean
Preceded by Lisa Carlton	President pro tempore of the Florida Senate; 2008–2010	Succeeded by Mike Bennett
Political offices
Preceded by Mike Olson	Tax Collector of Pasco County, Florida; 2013–present	Incumbent
