= Amber Mariano (politician) =

American politician

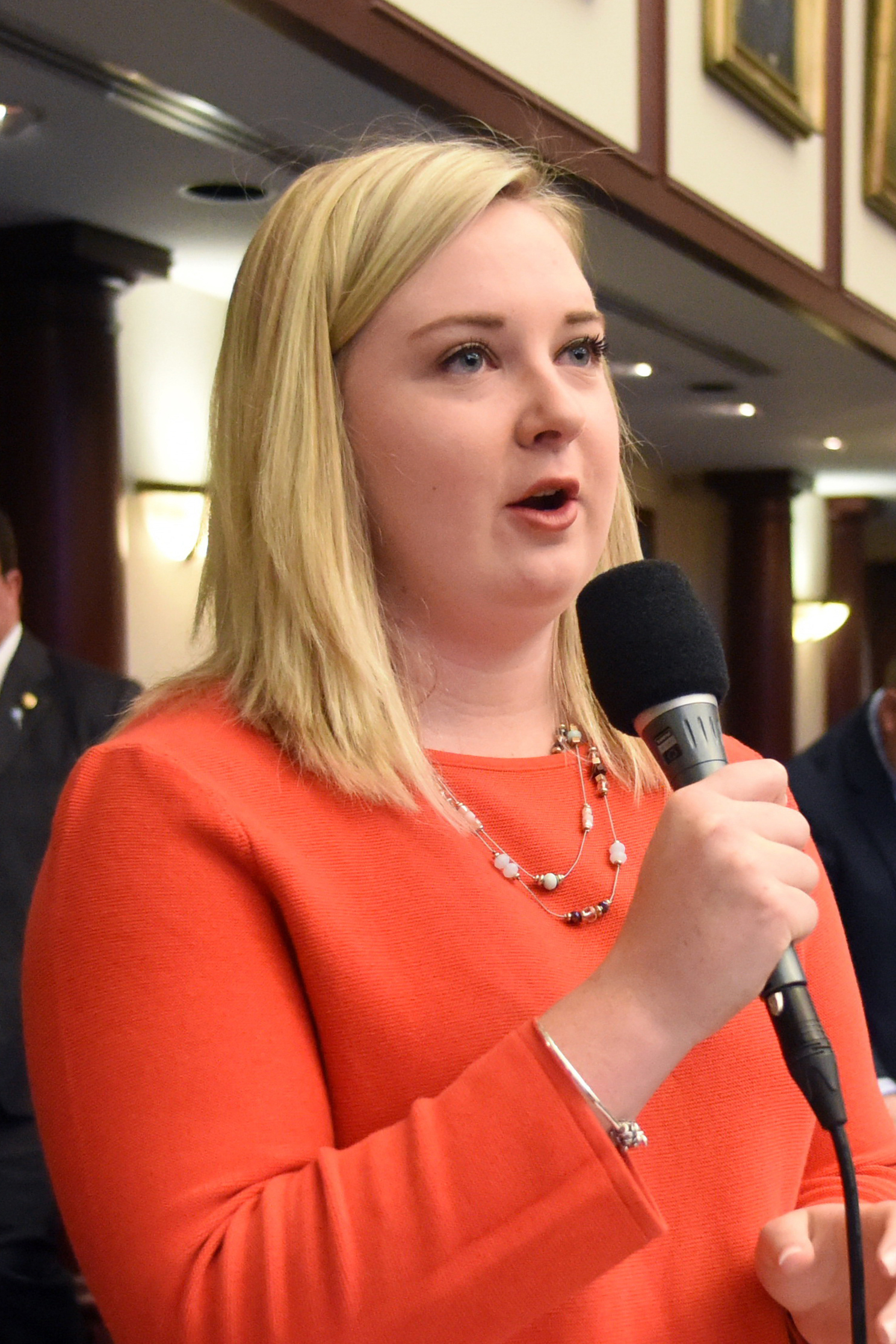

Member of the Florida House of Representatives from the 36th district
- In office November 8, 2016 – November 8, 2022
- Preceded by: Amanda Murphy
- Succeeded by: Brad Yeager

Personal details
- Born: October 18, 1995 (age 30)
- Party: Republican
- Education: University of Central Florida (B.A.)
- Profession: Real Estate Agent

Amber Mariano (born October 18, 1995) is an American politician who served in the Florida House of Representatives from 2016 through 2022. A member of the Florida Republican Party, she was first elected to the Florida legislature in 2016 while still a student at the University of Central Florida. At 21, she was the youngest representative ever elected. She was reelected in 2018.

She is the daughter of Jack Mariano, a Pasco County Commissioner.

== Elections ==
Mariano ran a campaign centered around higher education and local flooding issues. Her campaign featured endorsements from then-Governor Rick Scott and U.S. Senator Marco Rubio. In November she defeated incumbent Democratic Representative Amanda Murphy. She won 50.5% to 49.5%, or by roughly 719 votes. This made her the youngest representative elected to the Florida House.

She was re-elected comfortably in 2018- 58.8% to 41.2%.

In 2022, Mariano decided not to seek re-election for a fourth term.

== Age ==
Rep. Mariano has been open about the challenges of running for office at a young age. She was profiled in Cosmopolitan, where she spoke about the issues she faced while campaigning. She recalled how members of her opponent's team negatively engaged with her at polling locations, making comments on how she had not yet graduated and demeaningly calling her "little girl".

In her re-election effort in 2018, her opponent Linda Jack called her a nice person who "was still too young to have this job". She went on to defeat Jack by more than 17 points.

== Attempted Dissolution of Port Richey ==
In October 2019, Rep. Mariano and State Senator Ed Hooper announced plans to dissolve the city of Port Richey, Florida. The city had seen scandals earlier that year regarding the mayor and his replacement. Mayor Dale Massad, who was caught practicing medicine without a license, was approached by a SWAT team and fired on the deputies. As a result, he was charged with attempted murder. Governor Ron DeSantis removed him from office through an executive order, replacing Massad with councilman Terrence Rowe. The new acting mayor was soon charged with obstruction charges related to the former mayor's case. Legislators argued that this measure would help put an end to the city's corruption. Another justification for the proposed dissolution was that it would cut costs. Mariano claimed that residents would see lower property taxes if passed.

If the measure succeeded, governance over the city's area would be handled directly by Pasco County. The county would assume the city's debts and would handle the arrangements of workers employed by the city.

Port Richey officials claimed that the effort to dissolve their city was a power grab meant to benefit Rep. Mariano's father, Jack Mariano. Jack Mariano denied this claim.

Mariano put an end to her city dissolution plans during a meeting a Pasco-Hernando State College with the county's legislative delegation on October 11, 2019. Instead, the Port Richey's finances would undergo a legislative audit.
