= Henry B. Plant High School =

Public high school in Tampa, Florida, United States

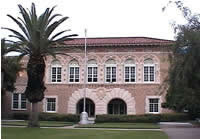
- Henry B. Plant High School in January 2007

Location
- 2415 South Himes Avenue; Tampa, Florida 33629; United States; 27°55′25″N 82°30′8″W

Information
- Type: Public high school
- Motto: Strength Through Unity
- Established: 1927
- School district: Hillsborough County Public Schools
- Principal: Heather Holloway
- Staff: 85.98 (FTE)
- Grades: 9–12
- Enrollment: 2,391 (2024-2025)
- Student to teacher ratio: 27.81
- Colors: Black and gold
- Team name: Panthers
- Rivals: Thomas Richard Robinson High School; Hillsborough; Jesuit High School
- Accreditation: Florida State Department of Education
- Website: www.hillsboroughschools.org/o/plant

H.B. Plant High School is a public high school located in the neighborhood of South Tampa in Tampa, Florida, United States. It opened in 1927 between South Himes Avenue on the east and Dale Mabry Highway on the west. The school is named after railroad and hotel tycoon Henry B. Plant, who connected Tampa to the United States railroad system in 1884. The school mascot is the Panther, and its motto is "Strength Through Unity." Plant High School has an enrollment of more than 2,500 students.

== Academics ==
U.S. News & World Report ranked Plant High School as the 36th best high school in Florida and the 478th best nationally in 2024. The school has twice been named a Blue Ribbon School of Excellence (1990 and 1997).

== Athletics ==
Interscholastic sports at Plant are sanctioned by the FHSAA.

- Baseball
- Basketball
  - Girls 2021 state champions
- Cheerleading
- Crew
- Cross country
  - Girls state championships in 1991, 1992, 1993, 1994, 1995, 1997, 2001, 2002, 2010, 2011, 2018, and 2020
- Flag football
  - State Champions - 2017
- Football
  - State Champions - 2006, 2008, 2009, and 2011
- Golf
  - State Champions - 2016
- Hockey
- Lacrosse
- Sailing
- Soccer
- Softball
- Swimming and diving
- Tennis
  - Girls Tennis - 2012, 2013 State Champions
- Track
- Volleyball (girls)
  - State Champions - 1975, 1976, 2006, 2007, 2008, 2009, 2010, 2021, and 2023
- Wrestling

== Notable alumni ==
- Pete Alonso, MLB player for the Baltimore Orioles
- Trey Azagthoth, founder and guitarist of Morbid Angel
- Andrew Beck, NFL player for the New York Jets
- Wade Boggs, Hall of Fame baseball player
- Lyrics Born, rapper and producer
- Jac Caglianone, MLB player
- Orson Charles, NFL tight end for the Cleveland Browns
- Duke Clark, college football running back for the Florida Gators
- John R. Culbreath, politician
- Samuel T. Durrance, astronaut
- Janet Echelman, artist and author
- Sandra Freedman, 55th Mayor of Tampa, Florida
- Gallagher, comedian
- Sam Gibbons, US congressman
- Geoffrey Giuliano, author and actor best known for Squid Game
- Mychal Givens, MLB player for the Baltimore Orioles
- Tucker Gleason, quarterback for the Toledo Rockets
- Ruth Hall, actress
- John Hudek, MLB pitcher and 1994 All-Star
- Richard King, four-time Academy Award winner for Best Sound Editing
- Lane Lindell, represented America in Miss World 2008
- Bobby Lord, country musician
- Robert Marve, former CFL quarterback for the Winnipeg Blue Bombers
- Jordan McCloud, quarterback for the James Madison Dukes
- Micah McFadden, NFL linebacker
- Aaron Murray, NFL quarterback
- Eric Patterson, NFL cornerback
- Whop Philyor, American football wide receiver
- Will Putnam, NFL center
- Connor Scott, baseball player for the Milwaukee Brewers organization
- Stephen Stills, member of the Crosby, Stills, Nash and Young musical group
- Kyle Tucker, baseball player for the Los Angeles Dodgers
- Preston Tucker, former MLB player, currently playing in Korea
- Dreama Walker, actress known for her role in Gossip Girl
- Christian Watson, NFL wide receiver for the Green Bay Packers
- James Wilder, Jr., NFL and CFL running back for the Toronto Argonauts
- Mazzi Wilkins, NFL player for the Baltimore Ravens
- Mike Williams, former NFL wide receiver
- Jake Woodford, MLB Pitcher

Teressa Virginia Longo, Film Editor
