= Rachel Plakon =

American politician

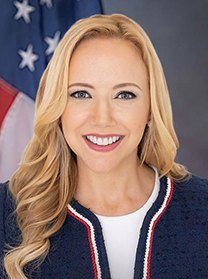

Member of the Florida House of Representatives from the 36th district
- In office November 8, 2022 – November 3, 2026
- Preceded by: Scott Plakon
- Succeeded by: Darryl Block

Personal details
- Born: Rachel Saunders
- Party: Republican
- Spouse: Scott Plakon (m. 2019)
- Children: 1
- Education: Oral Roberts University (BA); Florida International University (MBA)

Rachel Saunders Plakon is an American politician who served as a member of the Florida House of Representatives for the 36th district from 2022 to 2026.

== Education ==
Plakon earned a Bachelor of Arts degree in mass media communication and journalism from Oral Roberts University and a Master of Business Administration from Florida International University.

== Career ==
In 2001 and 2002, Plakon served as a community liaison and spokesperson for Governor Jeb Bush. She later worked as a real estate agent for Keller Williams Realty and land specialist for NAI Realvest. Since 2018, Plakon has been a member of the Florida Commission on the Status of Women. She also owns a real estate investment company.

In the 2022 Florida House of Representatives elections, Plakon ran against Deborah Poulalion for the District 36 House of Representatives seat.

In March 2023, Plakon sponsored HB 1521 in the Florida State Senate, an anti-trans bathroom bill, which is supported by Florida District 29 Representative Webster Barnaby, a Republican from Deltona who called trans people "demons" and "mutants". The bill, titled the "Safety in Private Spaces Act," considers it trespassing for a person to enter a bathroom opposite of their assigned sex at birth. A maximum penalty of trespassing in this case could be a prison term of one year or a fine of $1,000.

In the 2024 United States elections, Plakon was reelected to the Florida District 36 House of Representatives seat.

In the 2026 United States elections, Plakon lost reelection to Darryl Block.

== Electoral history ==
Florida District 36 House of Representatives Election, 2022
Party	Candidate	Votes	%
Republican	Rachel Plakon	33,934	54.6
Democratic	Deborah Poulalion	28,162	45.4
Total votes		62,096	100.0

Florida District 36 House of Representatives Election, 2024
Party	Candidate	Votes	%
Republican	Rachel Plakon	47,814	53.6
Democratic	Kelley Diona Miller	40,804	46.4
Total votes		88,618	100.0

Florida District 36 House of Representatives Election, 2026
Party	Candidate	Votes	%
Democratic	Darryl Block	37,855	54.7
Republican	Rachel Plakon	31,390	45.3
Total votes		69,245	100.0
