= Amanda Murphy (politician) =

Florida State Representative

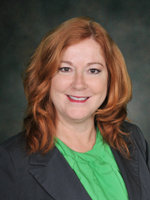

Member of the Florida House of Representatives from the 36th district
- In office October 15, 2013 – November 8, 2016
- Preceded by: Mike Fasano
- Succeeded by: Amber Mariano

Personal details
- Born: June 5, 1970 (age 56) Conway, South Carolina
- Party: Democratic
- Spouse: Divorced
- Children: Savannah Paige Stacy,
- Education: Florida State University (B.S.)
- Profession: Financial advisor

Amanda Hickman Murphy (born June 5, 1970) is a Democratic politician from Florida. She served in the Florida House of Representatives from 2013 to 2016, representing parts of western Pasco County, including the city of New Port Richey. She was a candidate for the Florida Senate in the 2018 elections, but was defeated by Ed Hooper.

== History ==
Murphy was born in Conway, South Carolina in 1970, and moved with her family to Pasco County in 1971. After graduating from high school, she attended Florida State University, where she received a degree in political science in 1992. She began working for Raymond James Financial in 1999 at a local branch as a financial advisor, eventually rising to become the vice-president for investments.

== Florida House of Representatives ==
When incumbent State Representative Mike Fasano, who had just been elected to the State House in 2012, resigned to accept an appointment by Governor Rick Scott to be the Pasco County Tax Collector, a special election was held to determine his replacement. Murphy won the nomination of the Democratic Party uncontested, and advanced to the general election, where she faced Bill Gunter, the Republican nominee and a pastor. Murphy campaigned on "repealing the nuclear cost recovery fee charged by Duke Energy, lowering insurance rates and restoring school funding," and she claimed support from Alex Sink and Charlie Crist. At the same time, Gunter racked up the support of Jeb Bush and Marco Rubio. Murphy was endorsed by the Tampa Tribune, which praised her "impressive business and community service background," calling her the "stronger candidate" and predicting that "she will put people first, not her political party or party leadership." She also picked up the endorsement of Fasano, despite the fact that he is a Republican and served in the party leadership in the legislature. On October 15, 2013, the day of the election, Murphy ended up narrowly defeating Gunter by 322 votes, receiving 51% of the vote. She was sworn into office on March 4, 2014.

While serving in the legislature, Murphy worked to sponsor legislation with Republican State Senator Rene Garcia to provide for Medicaid expansion as provided for by the Patient Protection and Affordable Care Act. She also filed legislation that would allow constituents of hers living at the Lake Jovita Golf and Country Club to de-annex from St. Leo and live in unincorporated Pasco County.

Murphy was reelected to a full term in November 2014, receiving 54.4% of the vote over Republican Chris Gregg's 45.6%. She was defeated two years later, losing to Republican Amber Mariano by 748 votes, 51–49%.

== Florida Senate ==
In May 2018, Murphy announced she was running for the Florida Senate in the open 16th district, which covers southwestern Pasco County and northern Pinellas County around New Port Richey and Clearwater.

In November 2018, Murphy was defeated by Ed Hooper, a retired City of Clearwater firefighter.
