= J. Frank Houghton =

American politician (1893–1968)

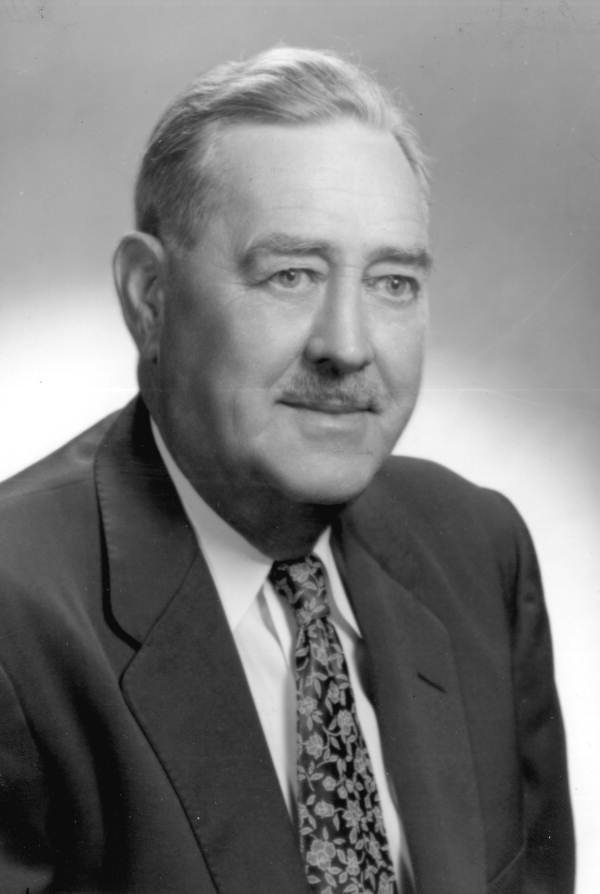
- Houghton in 1959

Member of the Florida Senate from the 11th district
- In office 1953–1959
- Preceded by: Henry Baynard
- Succeeded by: Bill Young

Personal details
- Born: October 24, 1893 Table Grove, Illinois, U.S.
- Died: May 28, 1968 (aged 74)
- Party: Republican
- Education: James Millikin University; University of Michigan

J. Frank Houghton (October 24, 1893 – May 28, 1968) was an American politician. He served as a Republican member for the 11th district of the Florida Senate.

== Life and career ==
Houghton was born in Table Grove, Illinois. He attended James Millikin University and the University of Michigan.

Houghton served in the Florida Senate from 1953 to 1959, representing the 11th district.

Houghton died on May 28, 1968, at the age of 74.
