= Jim Sebesta =

American politician (1935–2024)

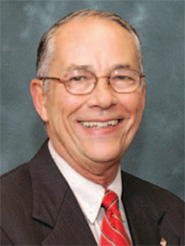

Member of the Florida Senate from the 16th district
- In office 2002–2006
- Preceded by: Locke Burt
- Succeeded by: Charlie Justice

Member of the Florida Senate from the 20th district
- In office 1999–2003
- Preceded by: Charlie Crist
- Succeeded by: Anna Cowin

Hillsborough County Supervisor of Elections
- In office 1970–1974

Personal details
- Born: August 24, 1935 Pontiac, Illinois, U.S.
- Died: January 29, 2024 (aged 88)
- Party: Republican
- Spouse: Jean
- Children: Six
- Education: Loyola University (BSC); DePaul University (MBA)
- Profession: Real Estate/Broker/Developer,

James Alvin Sebesta (August 24, 1935 – January 29, 2024) was an American politician. He served as a Republican member of the Florida Senate from 1998 to 2006. He previously served as Hillsborough County Supervisor of Elections from 1970 to 1974. He died on January 29, 2024, at the age of 88.

== Early life ==
Sebesta was born in Pontiac, Illinois on August 24, 1935, and studied at Loyola University Chicago and DePaul University, from where he attained a Masters in Business Administration (MBA).

Sebesta and his wife, Jean, subsequently moved to Florida where he became general manager of a radio station in Lake Wales, and a member of the Lake Wales City Commission.

== Political career ==
He became Hillsborough County elections supervisor in 1972, succeeding Jim Fair, and ran unsuccessfully to become Secretary of State of Florida two years later. In 1976, he oversaw the Florida division of Gerald Ford's Presidential campaign.

Sebesta and his family moved to St. Petersburg, Florida in 1984, where he started a home building company. He returned to politics in 1998, elected to the Florida State Senate and becoming Republican majority whip and transportation committee chairman.

After stepping down from the Senate in 2006, Sebesta was appointed to the Florida Transportation Commission by Governor Rick Scott.

== Death ==
Sebesta died following complications from dementia on January 29, 2024, aged 88; at the time of his death he had six children, 12 grandchildren and 8 great-grandchildren.

Party political offices
Preceded by Don B. Mieklejohn	Republican nominee for Secretary of State of Florida; 1974	Succeeded by Ander Crenshaw
