= First National Bank (Brooksville, Florida) =

Coordinates: 28.555°N 82.388°W

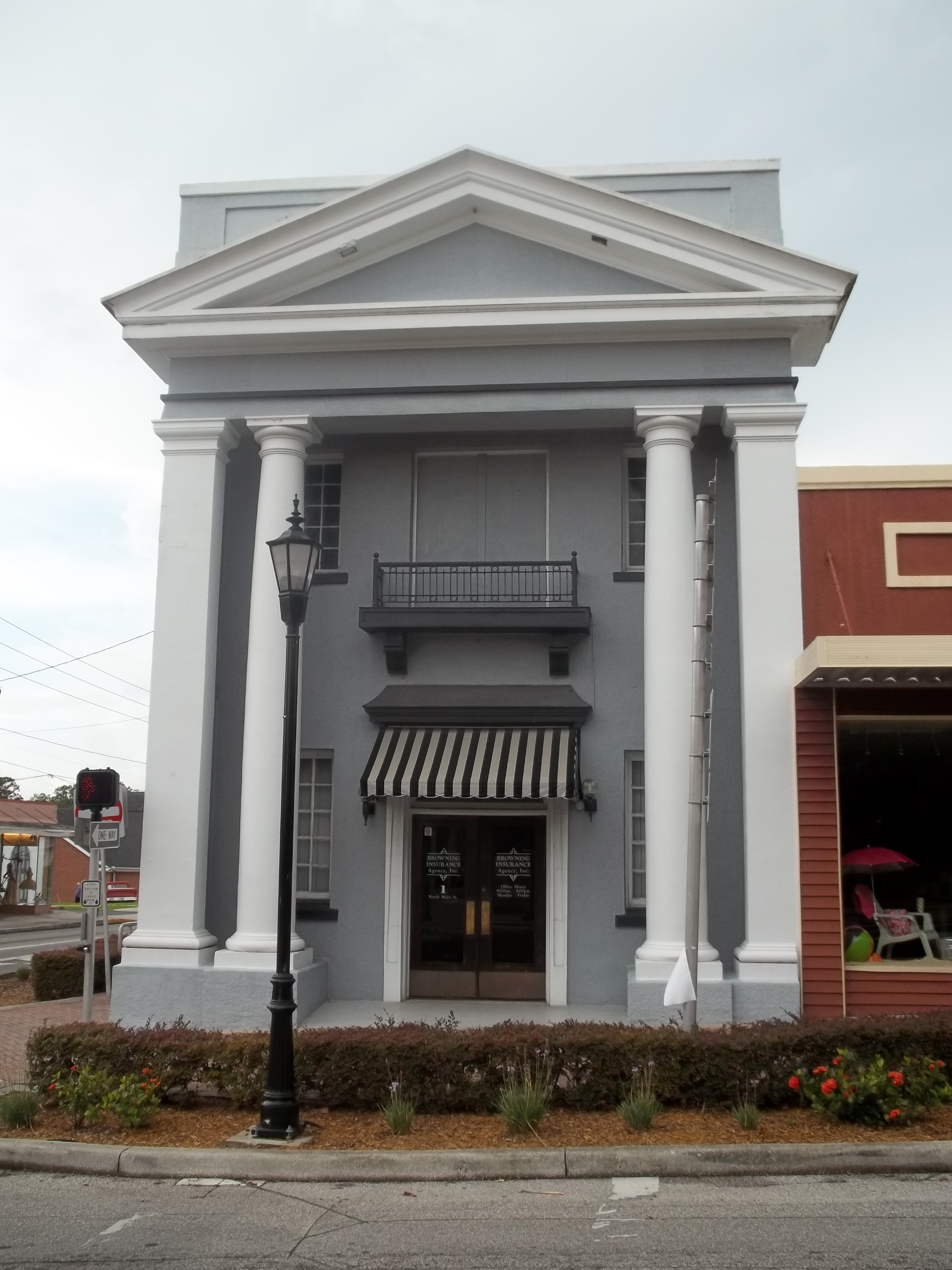
First National Bank in Brooksville

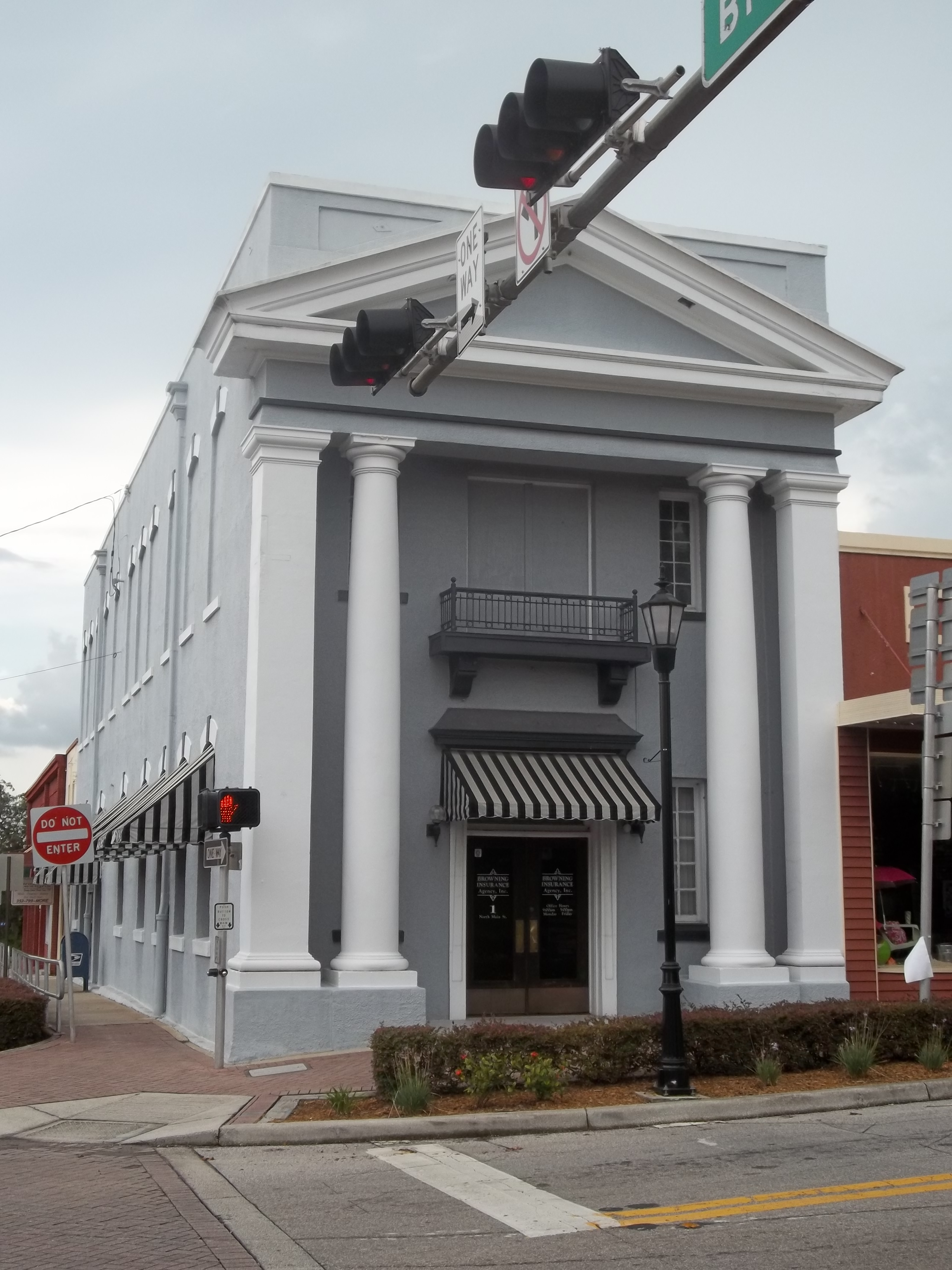
First National Bank in Brooksville

First National Bank is a historic bank building in Brooksville, Florida. It was built in 1910 and is located at 1 Main Street. The 2-story brick building includes cast iron columns. The brick exterior was remodeled to give it a more Neoclassical appearance before 1926. The bank's first president, John Weeks, owned Weeks Hardware (built in 1913) at 115 North Main. It is now used for the offices of Browning Insurance. John R. Culbreath once served as the chairperson for the bank.
