= Anna Cowin =

American politician

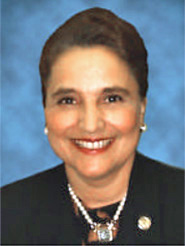
Image of Senator Anna P. Cowin

Anna Cowin is a former Lake County School District superintendent and served in the Florida State Senate. A Republican representing Leesburg in the 20th District State Senate Seat, in 2004 Cowin announced that she would not seek re-election to her seat and instead would run for Lake County Superintendent of Schools. She was succeeded by Carey Baker.

Cowin was born in Brooklyn, New York. She has a BA from the College of New Rochelle in New York (1968) and an MS from Fordham University. She authored Kayla McKean legislation (Kayla McKean Child Protection Act).

In 1997 Cowin and Mark Ogles co-sponsored legislation legalizing the practice of chemical castration of sex offenders as a condition of their parole. Despite the bill's draconian phrasing, a 2005 Palm Beach Post review found that Florida's use of their chemical castration measure was limited to 15 offenders out of a population of 2,300.

She is married and has three children.

Florida Senate
Preceded by Karen Johnson	Member of the Florida Senate from the 11th district 1996–2002	Succeeded by Mike Fasano
Preceded by Jim Sebesta	Member of the Florida Senate from the 20th district 2002–2004	Succeeded by Carey Baker
