= Alan Hays =

American politician

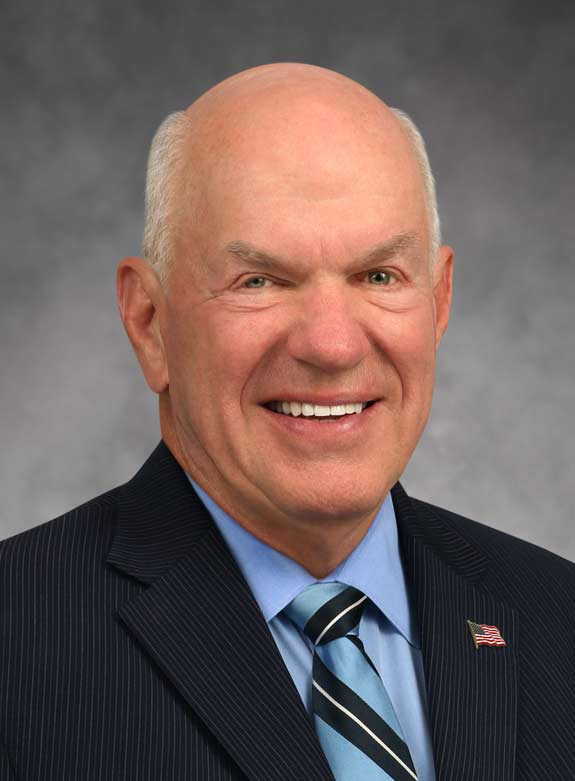
- Official portrait

Supervisor of Elections of Lake County
- Incumbent
- Assumed office January 3, 2017
- Preceded by: Emogene Stegall

Member of the Florida Senate from the 11th district 20th (2010-2012)
- In office November 2, 2010 – November 8, 2016
- Preceded by: Carey Baker (20th); Mike Fasano (11th)
- Succeeded by: Jack Latvala (20th); Randolph Bracy (11th)

Member of the Florida House of Representatives from the 25th district
- In office November 2, 2004 – November 2, 2010
- Preceded by: Carey Baker
- Succeeded by: Larry Metz

Personal details
- Born: March 12, 1946 (age 80) Henderson, Kentucky
- Party: Republican
- Spouse: Jeanne Lease Hays
- Children: JoAnn, Leslie, Nancy
- Education: Connors State College (A.S.); University of Florida College of Dentistry (D.M.D.)
- Profession: Dentist

Dixon Alan Hays (born March 12, 1946) is an American dentist and politician who has served as the supervisor of elections of Lake County, Florida since 2017. A member the Republican Party, he previously served in the Florida Senate from 2010 to 2016 and in the Florida House of Representatives from 2004 to 2010.

== History ==
Hays was born in Henderson, Kentucky, and moved to Florida in 1950. He attended Connors State College, located in Warner, Oklahoma, where he received his bachelor's degree in 1967. After that, he joined the United States Coast Guard, where he was a dental technician from 1967 to 1970. Hays later attended the University of Florida College of Dentistry, from which he graduated in 1976. He settled in Umatilla, Florida, and served on the Lake-Sumter State College Board of Trustees for six years.

== Florida Legislature ==
=== Florida House of Representatives ===
In 2004, when the incumbent State Representative Carey Baker declined to seek re-election so that he could instead run for the Florida Senate, Hays ran to succeed him in the 25th District, which stretched from Howey-in-the-Hills to Debary and included parts of eastern Lake County, northwestern Seminole County and southern Volusia County. He faced Larry Metz, Johnny Smith, Randy Wiseman and JoAnn Huggins in the Republican primary. Hays was narrowly victorious over his opponents, receiving 35% of the vote to Metz's 29%, and advanced to the general election, where he was elected overwhelmingly over only write-in opposition. He was re-elected without opposition in 2006 and 2008. During a 2010 debate over legislation that required a woman to undergo an ultrasound before receiving an abortion, Hays controversially compared abortion to the Holocaust before he was cut off by the then-Speaker of the Florida House of Representatives, Larry Cretul, which prompted a Jewish member of the House to object.

=== Senate ===
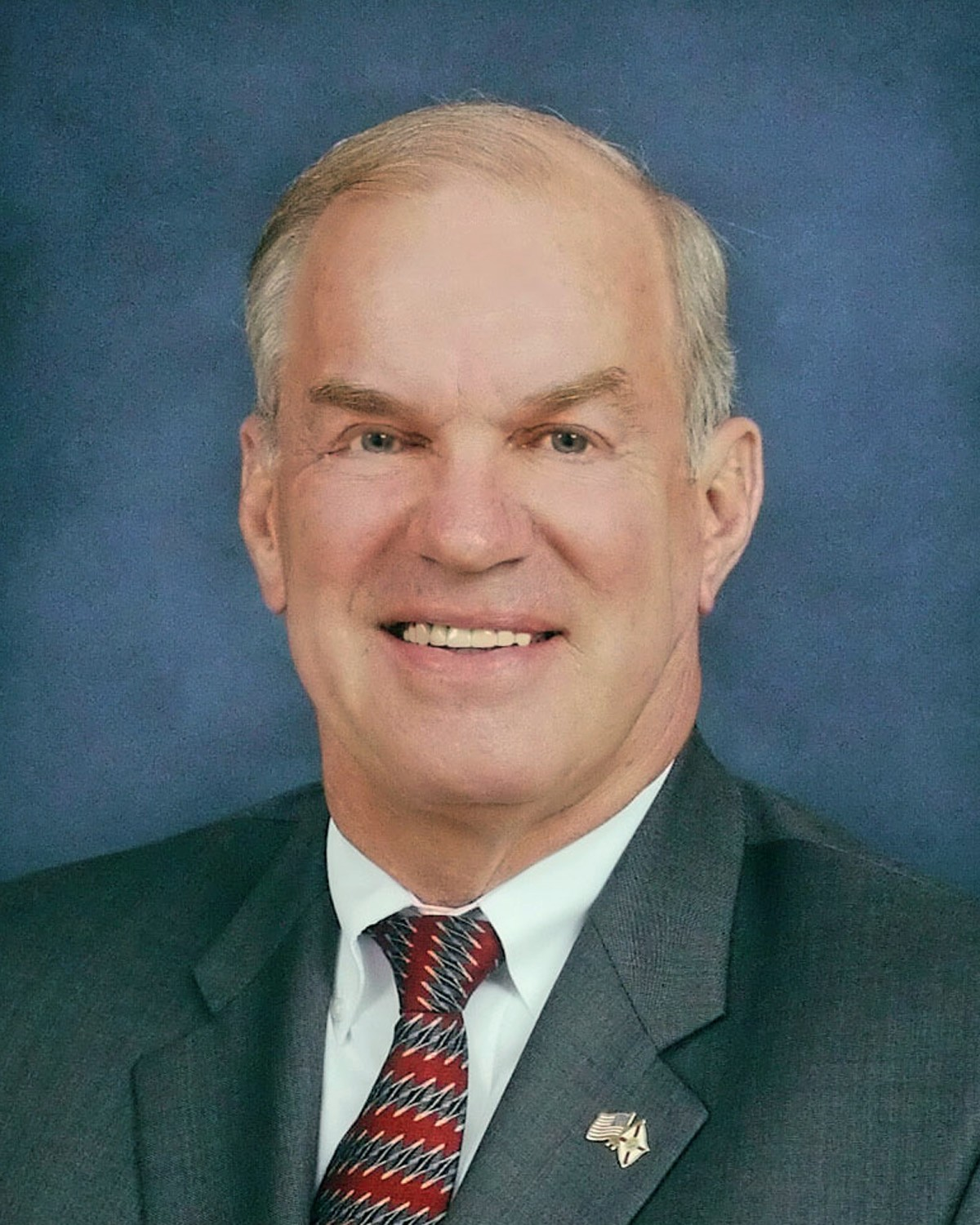
Hays's legislative portrait

When Carey Baker, whom Hays had succeeded in the House in 2004, decided not to run for re-election to his seat in the Florida Senate, Hays ran to fill the open seat in the 20th District, which included Lake County, southern Marion County, northwestern Seminole County, northern Sumter County and western Volusia County. He won the Republican primary unopposed and, in the general election, faced Eunice Garbutt, the Democratic nominee, whom he defeated with 67% of the vote.

In 2012, the state's legislative districts were redrawn and Hays was moved into the 11th District, where he opted to seek re-election and which contained most of the territory that he had previously represented. He was opposed by the independent candidate John Iler, and campaigned on making Florida "a business-friendly state" by cutting regulations, improving education, speeding up the process for permits to be granted, keeping taxes low and creating an internet sales tax. Once again, Hays was re-elected comfortably, receiving 72% of the vote to Iler's 28%.

== Supervisor of Elections ==
Following court-ordered redistricting in 2016, Hays opted not to run for re-election in his reconfigured Senate district, but instead to run for Lake County Supervisor of Elections, which was being vacated by the long time Supervisor Emogene Stegall. Hays won the general election with 55% of the vote, leading Democrat Christopher Flint with 32% and no-party-affiliation candidate Scott Larson with 12%.

=== Criticism ===
In 2011, during Florida's redistricting, Hays was heavily criticized when he made the statement, "We all know there are many Hispanic-speaking people in Florida that are not legal [...] and I just don't think it's right that we try to draw a district that encompasses people that really have no business voting anyhow." His suggestion of a racially based double standard led to statewide criticism from fellow senators, representatives and the media.

During the 2013 legislative session, Hays sponsored legislation that would have banned public buses from stopping on streets after an incident in which he was driving behind a bus that pulled off on the side of the road to load and unload passengers, and he was unable to pull around it, which an Orlando Sentinel columnist called "absurd".

In 2014, Hays wrote legislation that was signed into law by Governor Rick Scott that "gives county school districts final responsibility for selecting instructional materials", allowing parents to protest textbooks at public hearings on the basis that some books "unfairly presented foreign cultures and doctrines...in public schools".

In July 2014, Hays announced his intention to introduce a bill requiring that all Florida public school students in middle or high school watch Dinesh D'Souza's film America unless their parents objected.

Florida House of Representatives
Preceded by Carey Baker	Member of the Florida House of Representatives from the 25th district 2004–2010	Succeeded by Larry Metz
Florida Senate
Preceded by Carey Baker	Member of the Florida Senate from the 20th district 2010–2012	Succeeded by Jack Latvala
Preceded by Mike Fasano	Member of the Florida Senate from the 11th district 2012–2016	Succeeded by Randolph Bracy
Political offices
Preceded by Emogene Stegall	Supervisor of Elections of Lake County, Florida; 2017–present	Incumbent
