= Florida's 11th Senate district =

American legislative district

Florida's 11th State Senate district
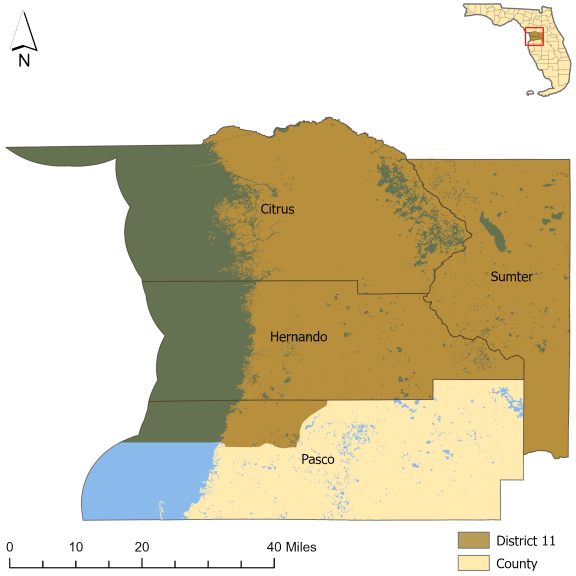
Senator
Ralph Massullo; R–Lecanto
- Demographics: 35.4% White; 35.7% Black; 24.7% Hispanic; 3.8% Asian; 0.4% Native American; 0.1% Hawaiian/Pacific Islander
- Population (2020): 556,064

Florida's 11th Senate district elects one member of the Florida Senate. The district consists of Citrus, Hernando, Sumter counties and part of Pasco county in the U.S. state of Florida. The current senator is Ralph Massullo.

== List of senators ==
NOTE: The following Information was gathered from the Florida Senate website. Only records of senators from 1998–present are kept.

Portrait	Name	Party	Years of service	Home city/state	Notes
	Anna P. Cowin	Republican	1996–2002	Brooklyn, New York	Consisted of Lake and parts of Citrus, Marion, Seminole and Sumter county
	Mike Fasano	Republican	2002–2012	Long Island, New York	Consisted of parts of Citrus, Hernando, Pasco, Pinellas counties
	Alan Hays	Republican	2012–2016	Henderson, Kentucky	Consisted of parts of Lake, Marion, Orange, Sumter counties
	Randolph Bracy	Democratic	2016–2022	Jacksonville, Florida	Consisted of part of Orange county
	Blaise Ingoglia	Republican	2022–2025	New York City, New York	Consists of Citrus, Hernando, Sumter counties and part of Pasco county
	Ralph Massullo	Republican	2025–present	Morgantown, West Virginia	Consists of Citrus, Hernando, Sumter counties and part of Pasco county

== Elections ==
NOTE: The following results were gathered from the Florida Department of State. Uncontested election results are not provided.

=== 1978 ===
Democratic Primary (1978)
Party	Candidate	Votes	%
Democratic	A. H. "Gus" Craig	18,686	76.8%
Democratic	Buck Nilsson	5,651	23.2%
Total votes		24,337	100%

Republican Primary (1978)
Party	Candidate	Votes	%
Republican	Vince Fechtel, Jr.	3,904	34.6%
Republican	Richard H. "Dick" Langley	4,788	42.5%
Republican	Claude Smoak	2,577	22.9%
Total votes		11,269	100%

Republican Primary Runoff (1978)
Party	Candidate	Votes	%
Republican	Vince Fechtel, Jr.	3,928	50.8%
Republican	Richard H. "Dick" Langley	3,810	49.2%
Total votes		7,738	100%

General Election (1978)
Party	Candidate	Votes	%
Democratic	A. H. "Gus" Craig	28,886	47.1%
Republican	Vince Fechtel, Jr.	32,388	52.9%
Total votes		61,274	100%

=== 1980 ===
Republican Primary (1980)
Party	Candidate	Votes	%
Republican	Charles B. Beals	3,466	25.0%
Republican	Richard H. (Dick) Langley	10,379	75.0%
Total votes		13,845	100%

General Election (1980)
Party	Candidate	Votes	%
Democratic	Jim Glisson	39,737	44.2%
Republican	Richard H. (Dick) Langley	50,199	55.8%
Total votes		89,936	100%

=== 1982 ===
Democratic Primary (1982)
Party	Candidate	Votes	%
Democratic	Gary Barnhart	8,075	48.9%
Democratic	Florence M. Hunter	8,450	51.1%
Total votes		98,011	100%

General Election (1982)
Party	Candidate	Votes	%
Democratic	Florence M. Hunter	26,003	39.1%
Republican	Richard H. (Dick) Langley	40,537	60.9%
Total votes		66,540	100%

=== 1984 ===
General Election (1984)
Party	Candidate	Votes	%
Democratic	Jim Martin	35,908	35.1%
Republican	Dick Langley	66,264	64.9%
Total votes		102,172	100%

=== 1992 ===
Democratic Primary (1992)
Party	Candidate	Votes	%
Democratic	Owen W. "Sonny" Conner, III	8,967	31.5%
Democratic	Karen Johnson	19,460	68.5%
Total votes		28,427	100%

General Election (1992)
Party	Candidate	Votes	%
Democratic	Karen Johnson	76,213	53.2%
Republican	Dick Langley	67,016	46.8%
Total votes		143,229	100%

=== 1996 ===
Republican Primary (1996)
Party	Candidate	Votes	%
Republican	Al J. Cone	5,716	16.0%
Republican	Anna Cowin	11,201	31.3%
Republican	Hope Lamb	11,230	31.4%
Republican	Gary Siegel	4,142	11.6%
Republican	Chester J White	3,463	9.7%
Total votes		35,752	100%

Republican Primary Runoff (1996)
Party	Candidate	Votes	%
Republican	Anna Cowin	15,103	57.8%
Republican	Hope Lamb	11,024	42.2%
Total votes		26,127	100%

General Election (1996)
Party	Candidate	Votes	%
Democratic	Charles Dean	68,103	43.1%
Republican	Anna Cowin	89,885	56.9%
Total votes		157,988	100%

=== 2000 ===
Republican Primary (2000)
Party	Candidate	Votes	%
Republican	Anna Cowin	27,140	64.5%
Republican	Everett Kelly	14,965	35.5%
Total votes		42,105	100%

General Election (2000)
Party	Candidate	Votes	%
Republican	Anna Cowin	107,836	57.2%
Democratic	Leslie Scales	80,657	42.8%
Total votes		188,493	100%

=== 2002 ===
Democratic Primary (2002)
Party	Candidate	Votes	%
Democratic	Lee Cannon	16,438	54.8%
Democratic	Steve Mattingly	13,536	45.2%
Total votes		29,974	100%

General Election (2002)
Party	Candidate	Votes	%
Republican	Mike Fasano	99,487	62.9%
Democratic	Lee Cannon	58,632	37.1%
Total votes		158,119	100%

=== 2004 ===
General Election (2004)
Party	Candidate	Votes	%
Republican	Mike Fasano	136,472	64.5%
Democratic	Steve Mattingly	74,995	35.5%
Total votes		211,467	100%

=== 2008 ===
Democratic Primary (2008)
Party	Candidate	Votes	%
Democratic	Richard Skandera	4,431	31.0%
Democratic	Fred Taylor	9,878	69.0%
Total votes		14,309	100%

General Election (2008)
Party	Candidate	Votes	%
Republican	Mike Fasano	141,140	65.0%
Democratic	Fred Taylor	76,114	35.0%
Total votes		217,254	100%

=== 2012 ===
General Election (2012)
Party	Candidate	Votes	%
Republican	Alan Hays	163,223	71.6%
Unaffiliated	John Iler	64,863	28.4%
Total votes		228,086	100%

=== 2016 ===
Democratic Primary (2016)
Party	Candidate	Votes	%
Democratic	Randolph Bracy	13,844	45.7%
Democratic	Chuck O'Neal	3,627	3,627%
Democratic	Bob Sindler	2,374	7.8%
Democratic	Gary Siplin	10,458	34.5%
Total votes		30,303	100%

=== 2020 ===
General Election (2020)
Party	Candidate	Votes	%
Republican	Joshua Eli Adams	79,224	35.0%
Democratic	Randolph Bracy	147,244	65.0%
Total votes		226,468	100%

=== 2022 ===
General Election (2022)
Party	Candidate	Votes	%
Republican	Blaise Ingoglia	192,167	75.0%
Green Party of Florida	Brian Patrick Moore	64,119	25.0%
Total votes		256,286	100%

=== 2024 ===
General Election (2024)
Party	Candidate	Votes	%
Republican	Blaise Ingoglia	229,609	69.3%
Democratic	Marilyn Holleran	101,775	30.7%
Total votes		256,286	100%

2025

2025 Florida Senate District 11 special election December 9, 2025
Party	Candidate	Votes	%
Republican	Ralph E. Massullo Jr	49,088	59.2%
Democratic	Ash Marwah	33,803	40.8%
Total votes		82,891	100%
Registered electors			
