= Carey Baker =

American politician

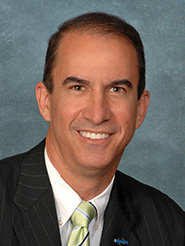

Member of the Florida Senate from the 20th district
- In office November 2004 – November 2010
- Preceded by: Anna Cowin
- Succeeded by: Alan Hays

Member of the Florida House of Representatives from the 25th district
- In office November 2000 – November 2004
- Preceded by: Stan Bainter
- Succeeded by: Alan Hays

Personal details
- Born: March 16, 1963 (age 63) Eustis, Florida, U.S.
- Party: Republican
- Spouse: Lori Baker
- Education: Lake-Sumter Community College (attended)

Military service
- Branch/service: United States Army
- Years of service: 1981–2013
- Rank: First Sergeant
- Unit: Alpha Company, 2nd Battalion, 124th Infantry Regiment
- Battles/wars: Operation Iraqi Freedom
- Awards: Combat Infantryman Badge; Jungle Expert Badge; Pathfinder Badge; Army Commendation Medal; Army Achievement Medal; National Defense Service Medal; Global War on Terrorism Expeditionary Medal; Overseas Service Bar (2)

Carey Baker (born March 16, 1963) is an American politician and Army veteran who served as the property appraiser of Lake County, Florida, from 2013 to 2025. A member of the Republican Party, he previously served in the Florida Senate from 2004 to 2010 and in the Florida House of Representatives from 2000 to 2004.

Baker is also the owner of the A.W. Peterson Gun Shop. He was the first state or federal elected official to serve in Operation Iraqi Freedom while also holding elected office.

== Early life and education ==
Baker was born and raised in Eustis. He is the son of former state representative Leighton Baker. Baker's family has owned the A.W. Peterson Gun Shop since 1952. When Baker was 18 years old, he joined the family business. Baker graduated from Tavares High School and attended Lake–Sumter Community College.

== Military service ==
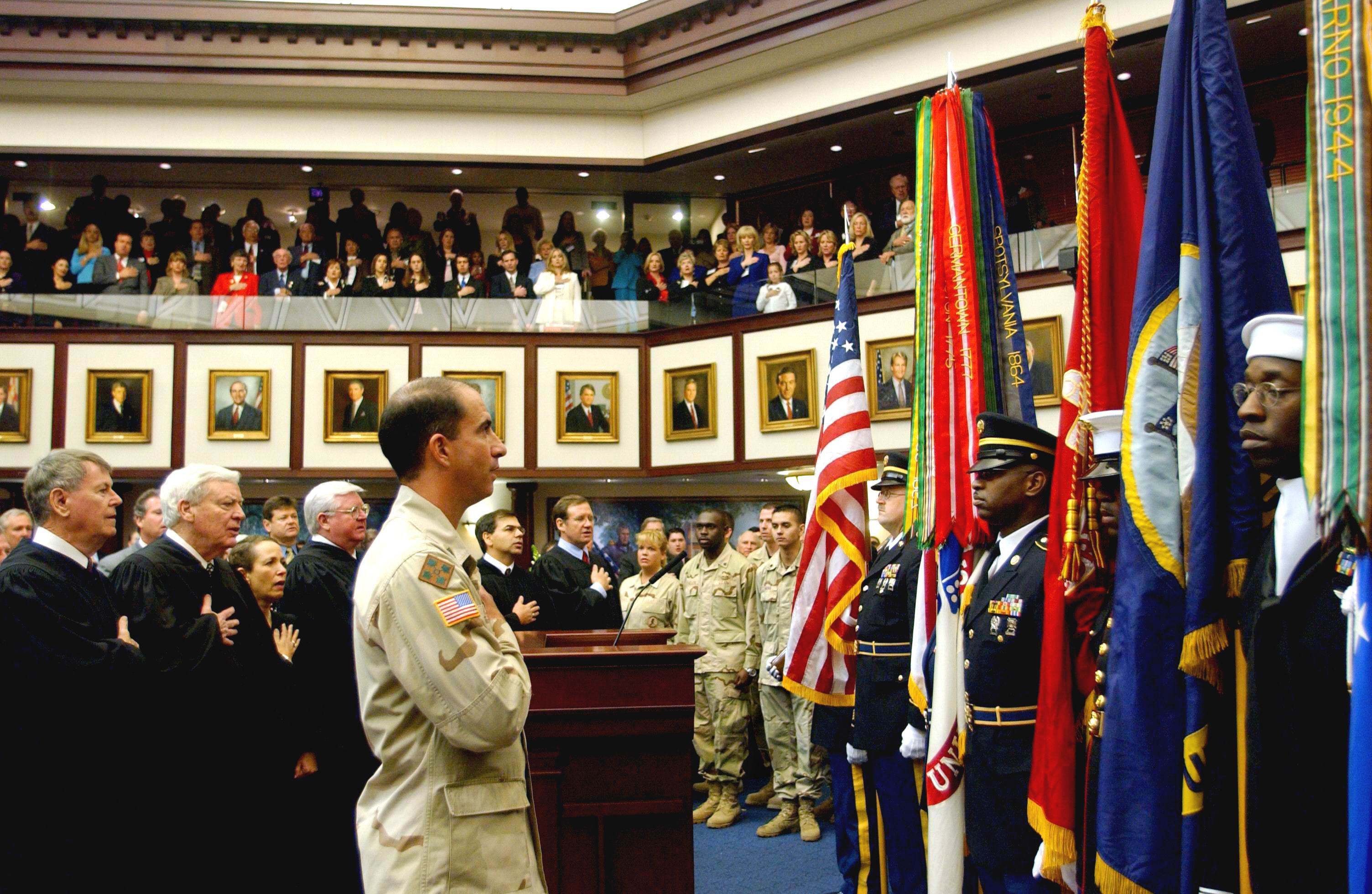
March 2, 2004: Baker presents the Pledge of Allegiance to the American Flag on the Floor of the Florida House of Representatives. (photo by Mark Foley)

Baker joined the Florida Army National Guard while still in high school.

In 2003, while a member of the Florida House of Representatives, Baker was deployed to Iraq. Baker's colleagues in the House tied a yellow ribbon around his chair on the House floor, which remained in place until he returned. In 2004, the Florida Legislature unanimously passed House Bill 1757, the Carey Baker Freedom Flag Act, which required every public school classroom in Florida to have an American flag on display.

In 2007, Baker was part of a thirteen-member team of Florida Army National Guardsmen sent to train soldiers from former Soviet Union satellite countries.

=== Awards and decorations ===
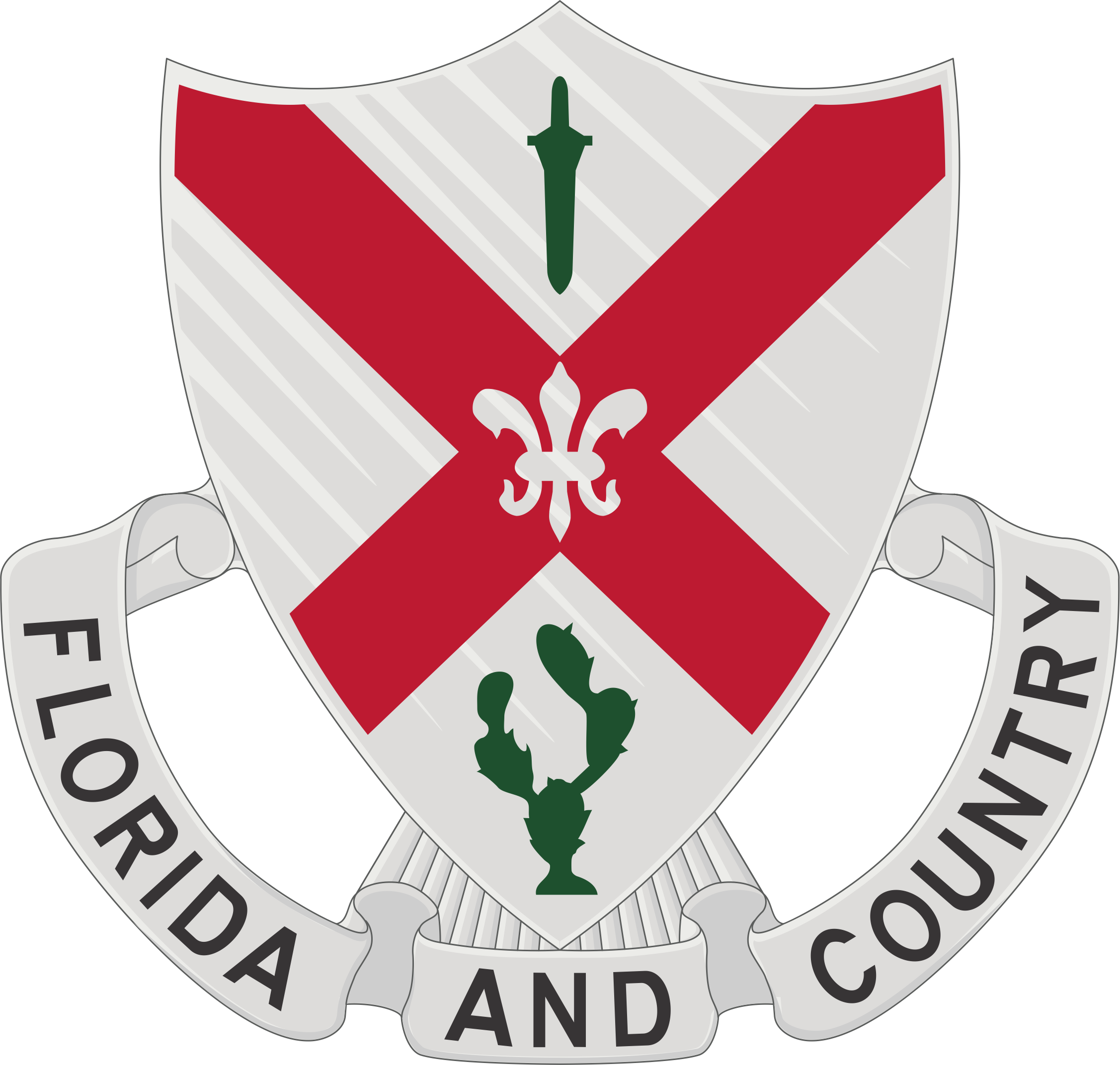

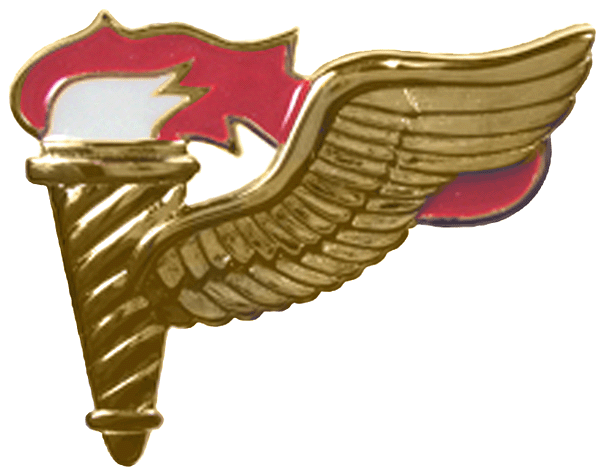
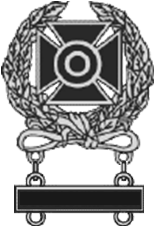

== Political career ==
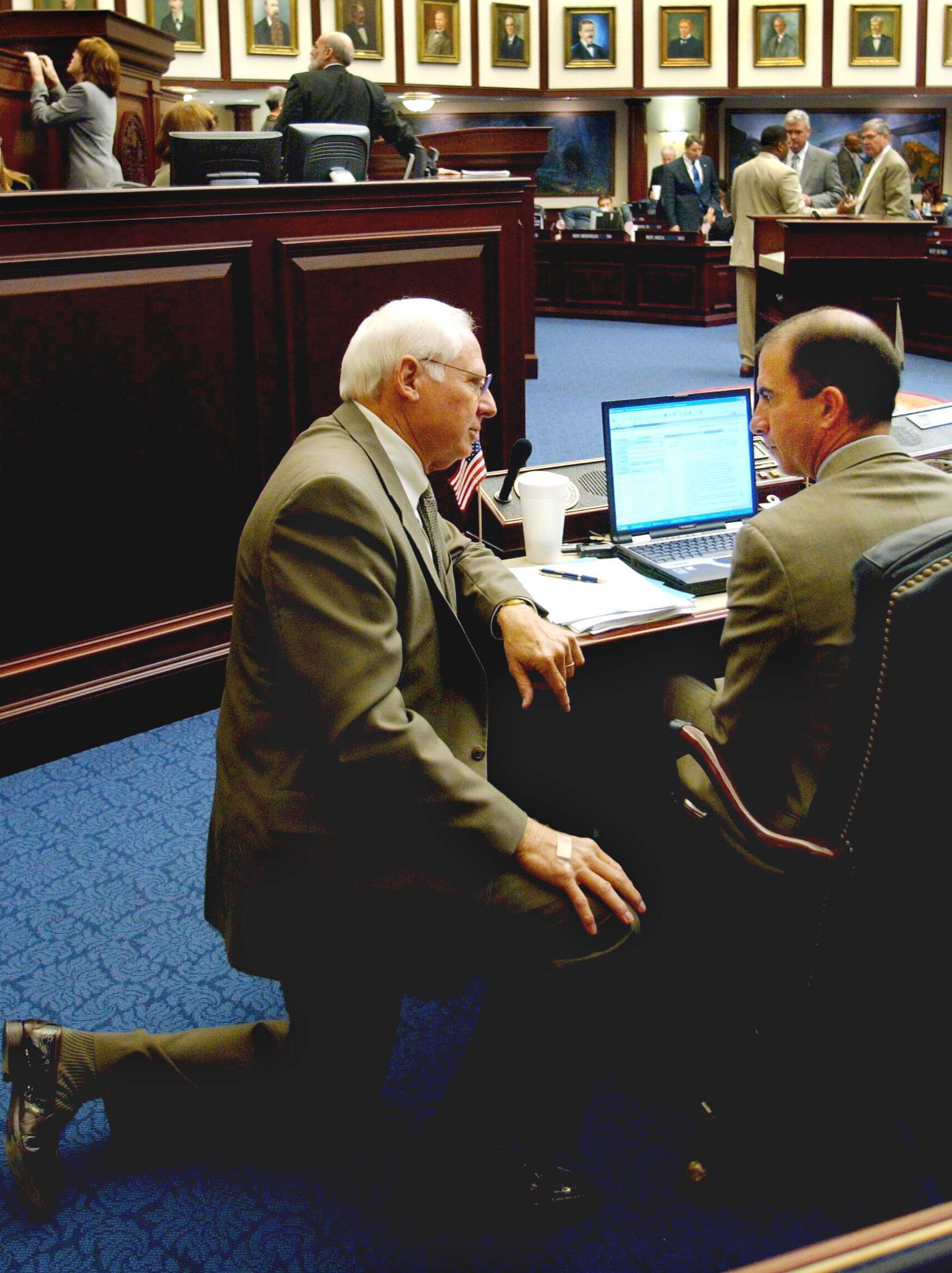
Ralph Poppell (R-Titusville), left, and Baker, right, confer on the House floor March 9, 2004. (photo by Mark Foley)

In 2004, Baker won a special election for the 20th District State Senate Seat after incumbent Anna Cowin announced she would run for Lake County Superintendent of Schools. He was re-elected to full terms in 2006 and 2008. The 20th Senate district includes parts of Marion, Sumter, Lake, Volusia, and Seminole counties. While serving in the Florida Senate, he was chairman of the Senate Government Operations Committee and on the Senate Transportation Committee, Senate Agriculture Committee, and Senate General Government Appropriation Committee.

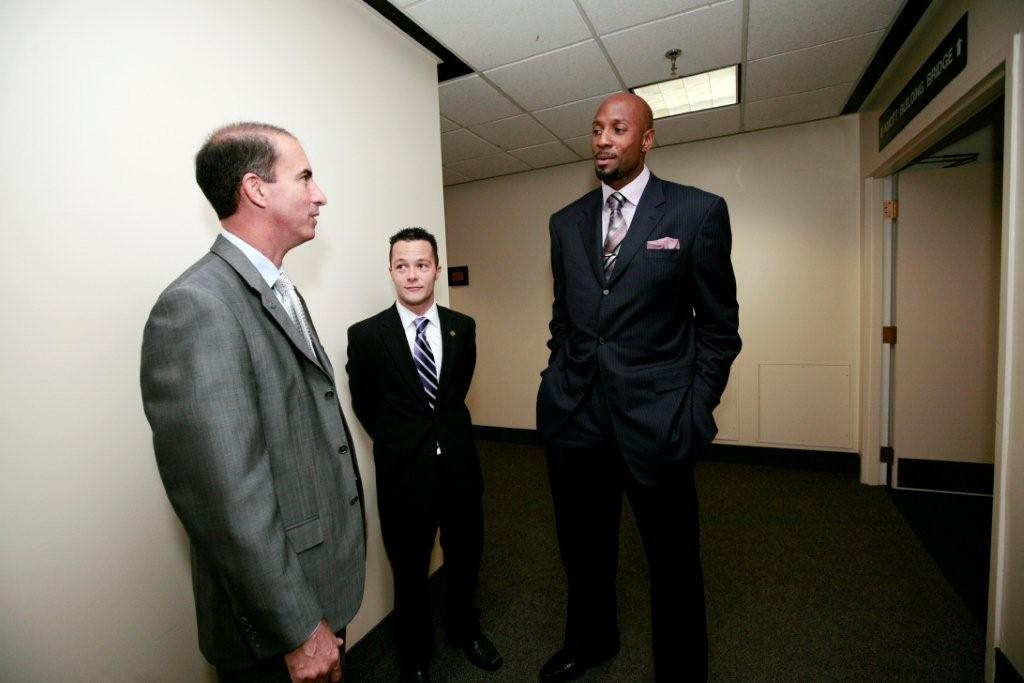
Baker with Legislative Aide Mike Norris and Miami Heat Center Alonzo Mourning

In 2012, Baker defeated incumbent Ed Havill for the position of property appraiser of Lake County, Florida, and ran unopposed in 2016. In 2014, Baker was elected president of the Florida Association of Property Appraisers. He was defeated for re-election by Mark Jordan on January 7, 2025.

== Legislative activities ==
In 2003, Baker introduced HB 805, which expanded Florida's private school voucher program to the families of military personnel. As Baker was deployed to Iraq, Frank Attkisson presented the bill on Baker's behalf. The bill passed 74–42.

In 2004, Baker passed legislation designating an eight-mile stretch of State Road 50, from Mascotte to Stuckey, the "Eric Ulysses Ramirez Highway". Ramirez was a 1991 graduate of Mount Dora High School, serving in the National Guard. He was killed on February 12, 2004, in Iraq. He was 31 years old.

In 2006, Baker passed the Justin McWilliams Act into law. The legislation made it so the State Uniform Traffic Rules were applicable on private property.

In 2007, Baker filed a bill to established a sales tax holiday, from June 1 through 12, 2007, exempting taxes on hurricane preparedness items.

Baker first introduced legislation to ban texting while driving in 2007. The legislation died in committee. In 2010, while serving as chairman of the Senate Transportation Committee, Baker filed SB 324 and SB 326, which would have banned anyone younger than 18 years of age from writing or sending a text message on an electronic communications device while operating a motor vehicle, but it died in committee.

In 2009, Baker was named "Senator of the Year" by the Florida Fraternal Order of Police.

In 2010, Baker introduced SJR 72, the Health Care Freedom Act. The act placed an initiative on the ballot that would have banned any laws requiring people buy health insurance. The bill passed the Senate and House and was placed on the ballot as Amendment 9.

== Electoral history ==
2000 Florida 25th House District Primary Election
Party	Candidate	Votes	%
Republican	Carey Baker	5,731	49
Republican	Betty Hensinger	4,625	39
Republican	Randy Wiseman	1,283	11

2000 Florida 25th House District Primary Election Runoff
Party	Candidate	Votes	%
Republican	Carey Baker	5,505	63
Republican	Betty Hensinger	3,206	36

2000 Florida 25th House District General Election
Party	Candidate	Votes	%
Republican	Carey Baker	35,304	62
Democratic	Rick Dwyer	21,520	37
