= Florida's 36th House of Representatives district =

Florida district

Florida's 36th State House of Representatives district
Representative
Darryl Block; D–Sanford

Florida's 36th House of Representatives district elects one member of the Florida House of Representatives. It covers parts of Seminole County. The incumbent representative is Democrat Darryl Block, who has served since November 3, 2026.

== Members ==
- Mike Fasano (2012–2013)
- Amanda Murphy (2013–2016)
- Amber Mariano (2016–2022)
- Rachel Plakon (2022–2026)
- Darryl Block (since 2026)
