= Jon L. Mills =

American lawyer and former politician

Jon Mills
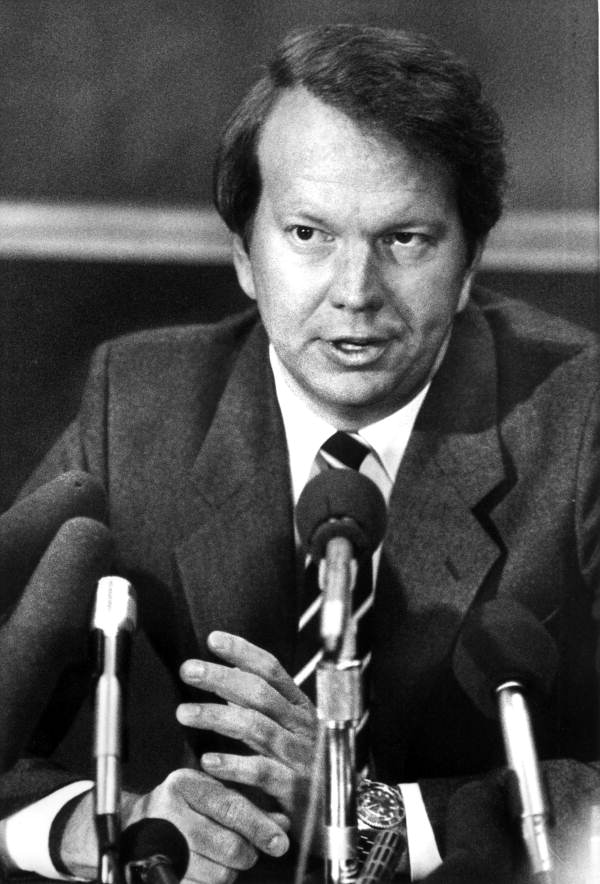
- Mills in 1987

Dean of the Fredric G. Levin College of Law
- In office 1999–2003
- Preceded by: Richard A. Matasar
- Succeeded by: Robert Jerry

84th Speaker of the Florida House of Representatives
- In office November 18, 1987 – November 14, 1988
- Preceded by: James Harold Thompson
- Succeeded by: Tom Gustafson

Member of the Florida House of Representatives from the 24th district
- In office November 15, 1982 – November 14, 1988
- Preceded by: Bill Bankhead (redistricting)
- Succeeded by: David Flagg

Member of the Florida House of Representatives from the 27th district
- In office November 20, 1978 – November 15, 1982
- Preceded by: William C. Andrews
- Succeeded by: Bobby Brantley

Personal details
- Born: July 24, 1947 (age 79) Miami, Florida, U.S.
- Party: Democratic
- Spouse: Beth Mills
- Children: 2
- Education: Stetson University (BA); University of Florida (JD)

Jon L. Mills (born July 24, 1947) is an American lawyer and former politician.

== Education ==
Mills earned a B.A. from Stetson University in 1969. He went on to the University of Florida College of Law where he graduated second overall in 1972. While at the Levin College of Law, he served on the Florida Law Review, and was a member of Florida Blue Key. Before Mills became the Dean (education) of the Levin College of Law, he served as a professor at the University of Florida in 1995.

== Work ==
Mills' main focus is on appellate litigation. He has appeared in courts throughout the United States on issues ranging from international jurisdiction, constitutionality of presidential budget cutbacks, the constitutionality of laws protecting victim's privacy, constitutionality of a Governor's gaming compact with Indians, to the constitutionality of proposed constitutional initiatives.

Mills is Dean Emeritus, Professor of Law, and Director of Center for Governmental Responsibility at the University of Florida Fredric G. Levin College of Law. He served as Dean of the college from 1999 to 2003. As a researcher and teacher, he has been a principal investigator and directed major studies attracting over six million dollars in grants on environmental and constitutional issues including international projects in Brazil, Poland, Haiti, and Central America.

In addition to teaching at the College of Law, he has taught and lectured in Constitutional Law, International Trade and Environment in Costa Rica, Brazil, the University of Warsaw and Cambridge University.

Mills has served as the director of the Center for Governmental Responsibility and was a member of the Florida House of Representatives from Gainesville, starting in 1978. He served as Speaker of the House during the legislature's 1986-88 session.

== Activities ==
Fellow of American Bar Foundation, The Florida Bar; Order of the Coif; Phi Kappa Phi; Florida Supreme Court Historical Society; Florida Supreme Court Professionalism Commission. Kennedy School of Government, Harvard University (1987).

Florida House of Representatives
Preceded by William C. Andrews	Member of the Florida House of Representatives from the 27th district 1978–1982	Succeeded by Bobby Brantley
Preceded by William G. Bankhead	Member of the Florida House of Representatives from the 24th district 1982–1988	Succeeded by David Flagg
Political offices
Preceded by James Harold Thompson	Speaker of the Florida House of Representatives; 1987–1988	Succeeded by Tom Gustafson
