= Law School Democrats of America =

American political organization

- Founded: 2006; 20 years ago
- Headquarters: Washington, D.C.
- Mother party: Democratic Party
- Website: www.lawdems.org

The Law Democrats of America (Law Dems) is a partisan group, but it is not officially affiliated with the Democratic National Committee (DNC). The organization is currently led by President Marc J. Hawk III, and the executive vice president is Spencer Jones.

== History ==
Law School Democrats of America was founded in 2006 at Harvard Law School by David Burd. The organization's first event was a national convention, keynoted by DNC Chairman Howard Dean, at Harvard Law School.

== Activities ==
Since 2006, hundreds of law students have taken an active role in Democratic politics, and local and national elections as members of the Law School Democrats. Student activities have included canvassing, legal research, phone banking, voter protection, and other activities.

== National convention ==
Every year the Law Democrats holds a national convention. The convention generally takes place in February or March over a weekend, and consists of discussion panels, keynote speakers, receptions, and an election for a new board of directors. Past conventions were held in Boston, New York City, Columbus, Ohio, Chicago, and Washington, D.C. Notable convention speakers include former DNC Chairman and Vermont Governor Howard Dean, New York Congressman Charles B. Rangel, Democratic political consultant Bob Shrum, Illinois Treasurer and former U.S. Senate candidate Alexi Giannoulias, Maryland Attorney General Doug Gansler, and Illinois Congresswoman Jan Schakowsky.

The 2011 Law School Democrats National Convention took place April 1–3 at the Georgetown University Law Center in Washington, D.C.

== 2025 rebrand ==
In 2025, the Law School Democrats of America officially rebranded as Law Democrats of America (LDA). This change expands LDA’s reach to include law students, pre-law students, and legal professionals.

== See also ==
- College Democrats
- College Democrats of America
- Young Democrats of America
- High School Democrats of America
