= Donald Nichols =

Don or Donald Nichols or Nicholls could refer to:

- Donald Nichols (American football) (1901–1978), American college football player and attorney
- Donald Nichols (spy) (1923–1992), U.S. Air Force officer
- Donald G. Nichols (born 1931), member of the Florida House of Representatives
- Don Nichols (1924–2017), American motorsport entrepreneur
- Donald Nicholls, Baron Nicholls of Birkenhead (1933–2019), British barrister and Law Lord
- Don Nicholls (1936–2023), Australian rules footballer

== See also ==
- Don Nickles (born 1948), former U.S. senator from Oklahoma
