= High School Democrats of America =

Student wing of U.S. Democratic Party

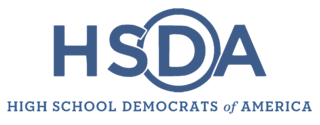
- Chairperson: Milan van Dam (MD)
- Vice-Chairperson: Alice Tran (CT); Jack George (VA)
- Communications Director: Asher L. Owens (NC)
- Programs Director: Mateo Cisneros (FL)
- Development Director: Jonah d’Alessio (CA)
- Founded: 2005; 21 years ago
- Split from: Young Democrats of America
- Ideology: Modern liberalism
- Mother party: Democratic Party
- Website: hsdems.org

The High School Democrats of America (HSDA) is a student-led organization that seeks to mobilize young people and elect Democrats. HSDA student activists across the country engage in political activity of the Democratic Party.

Formerly part of the Young Democrats of America, HSDA represents high school students at all levels of the Democratic Party.

== History ==
Although individual unaffiliated state chapters existed long beforehand, the High School Democrats of America itself was founded in December 2005 by Ahmed Kokon of New York and Jonathan Padilla of California. Initial board members included Pennsylvania high schoolers Eddy Foster and Alicia Froio.

In June 2014, HSDA broke from the Young Democrats of America, and ceased functioning as the Young Democrats of America's High School Caucus. With the change, the position of National Parliamentarian became Development Director. The Development Director served as Parliamentarian and resolved disputes and presided over elections.

The organization held its first national conference, the HSDA Strategic Summit, in Washington, D.C., during July 2015.

At the 2019 summer meeting of the Democratic National Committee, the party's charter and bylaws were amended to grant HSDA two seats on the DNC. In 2025, the bylaws were further amended to grant the HSDA national chairperson a seat on the DNC Executive Committee. Chairperson Milan van Dam of Maryland is the youngest individual in history to serve on the committee.

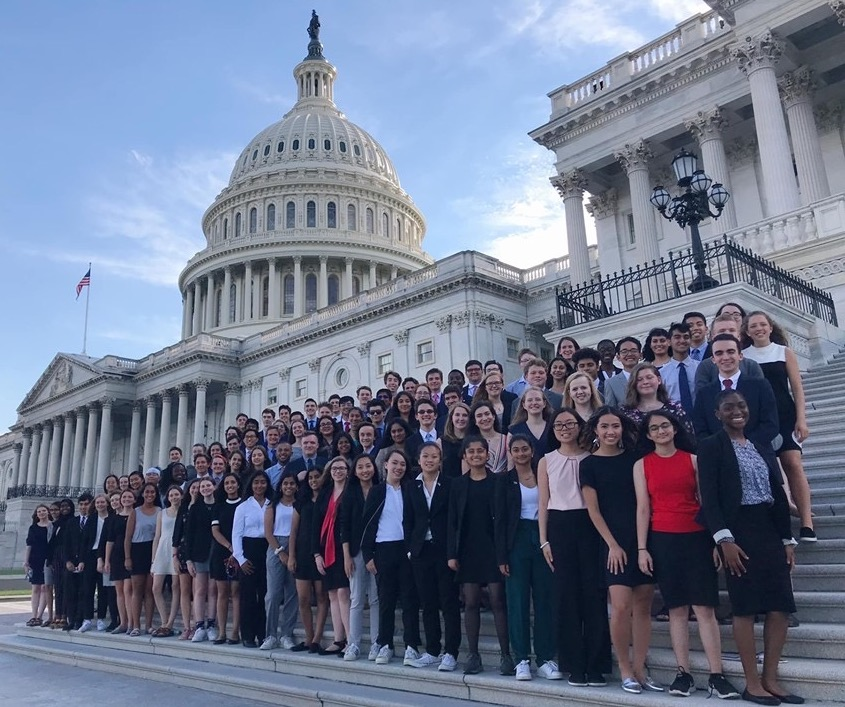
HSDA members pose on the steps of the United States Capitol.

== Organization ==
The organization and rules governing HSDA are found in the organization's Official Bylaws.

The national organization presides over HSDA as a whole. It is led by the National Executive Board, which consists of the Chair, two Vice-Chairs of different genders, the Communications Director, the Programs Director, and the Development Director. The National E-Board is responsible for overseeing the organization, expanding HSDA, and working with states to promote Democratic causes. The National E-Board is elected every year by a ranked-choice election accessible to all members regardless of location. Leadership also includes a National Committee consisting of two representatives from individual states, territories, and the District of Columbia, in addition to Chairs and Vice Chairs from each Caucus. The Executive Board employs a group of volunteer staff, ranging from Financial Directors to Political Advisors. Other organizations at the national level include the Ethics Council, which resolves issues in an unbiased manner; the Caucuses, which represent marginalized communities of race, orientation, and disability; the Diversity Committee, which consists of the Chairs and Vice-Chairs of the Caucuses as well as the Diversity Director and promotes inclusivity; and the Adult Advisory Board, which assists the E-Board in legal and financial matters as well as long-term planning.

Each state organization works with all the local chapters in their state, and is responsible for connecting chapters, expanding HSDA, working on legislation, and promoting Democratic causes at the state level. State chapters also have an extensive list of accolades, including hosting a “Unity Day” with the Teen Age Republicans to promote bipartisanship. Each state holds its own elections to determine who assumes state leadership.

Local chapters at high schools and in communities work at a grassroots level by rallying young people behind causes. These chapters frequently engage with their local school boards to influence district policy and host public forums for candidates running for local offices. Local HSDA chapters have organized marches, registered voters, and helped to elect Democrats in their own communities.

== Caucuses ==
The HSDA National Caucus System consists of the Asian American/Native Hawaiian/Pacific Islander (AANHPI) Caucus, Black Caucus, Disabled Caucus, First Generation Caucus, Hindu Caucus, Jewish Caucus, Latino Caucus, LGBTQ+ Caucus, Muslim Caucus, Women's Caucus, and Middle Eastern/North African (MENA) Caucus. Caucuses were formed to represent groups that, because of their gender, sexual orientation, disabilities, religious beliefs, or ethnicity, face substantial discrimination in American society as a whole. These caucuses actively organize events and advocacy campaigns tailored to their specific communities. In 2020, the LGBTQ+ Caucus organized a national "Virtual Pride" events to unite queer student activists across the country. Additionally, members of the Disabled Caucus have engaged in direct advocacy to improve accommodations and policies for students with disabilities within their local public school systems.

== Activities ==
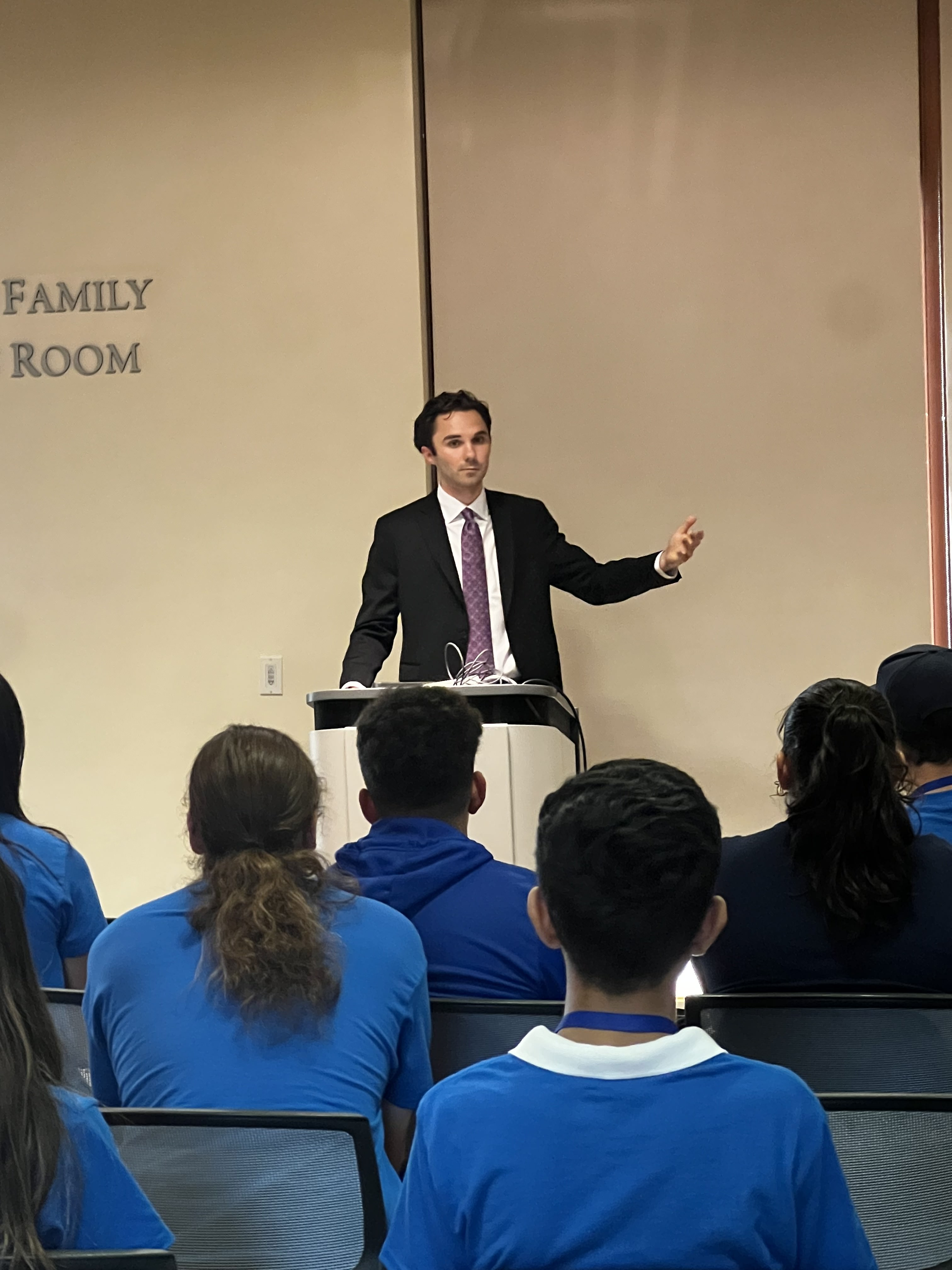
David Hogg addresses the 2024 HSDA National Summit.

The organization is involved in a number of projects, including a Huffington Post blogging project and a separate publishing opportunity through The Progressive Teen, which serves as the official magazine of the organization with a full editorial staff. Both projects are aimed at inspiring political discourse and offering members the opportunity to voice their opinions about important civic issues in a highly visible setting. The organization has also proved instrumental and necessary in several campaigns across the country, including the election of Joe Donnelly and Elizabeth Warren to the US Senate, as well as the notable election of President Barack H. Obama in 2008. The organization has taken stances on important issues throughout the political spectrum, but has been recently focused on student loan reform, immigration reform, and gun control. After the Stoneman Douglas High School shooting in February 2018, HSDA members began to advocate for stronger gun control.

HSDA has endorsed candidates in local, state, and federal elections, frequently mobilizing young voters around key youth issues such as the economy, inflation, and climate change. The organization issued joint youth endorsements for the Biden–Harris ticket and engaged in extensive mobilization efforts for Kamala Harris in the 2024 presidential election.

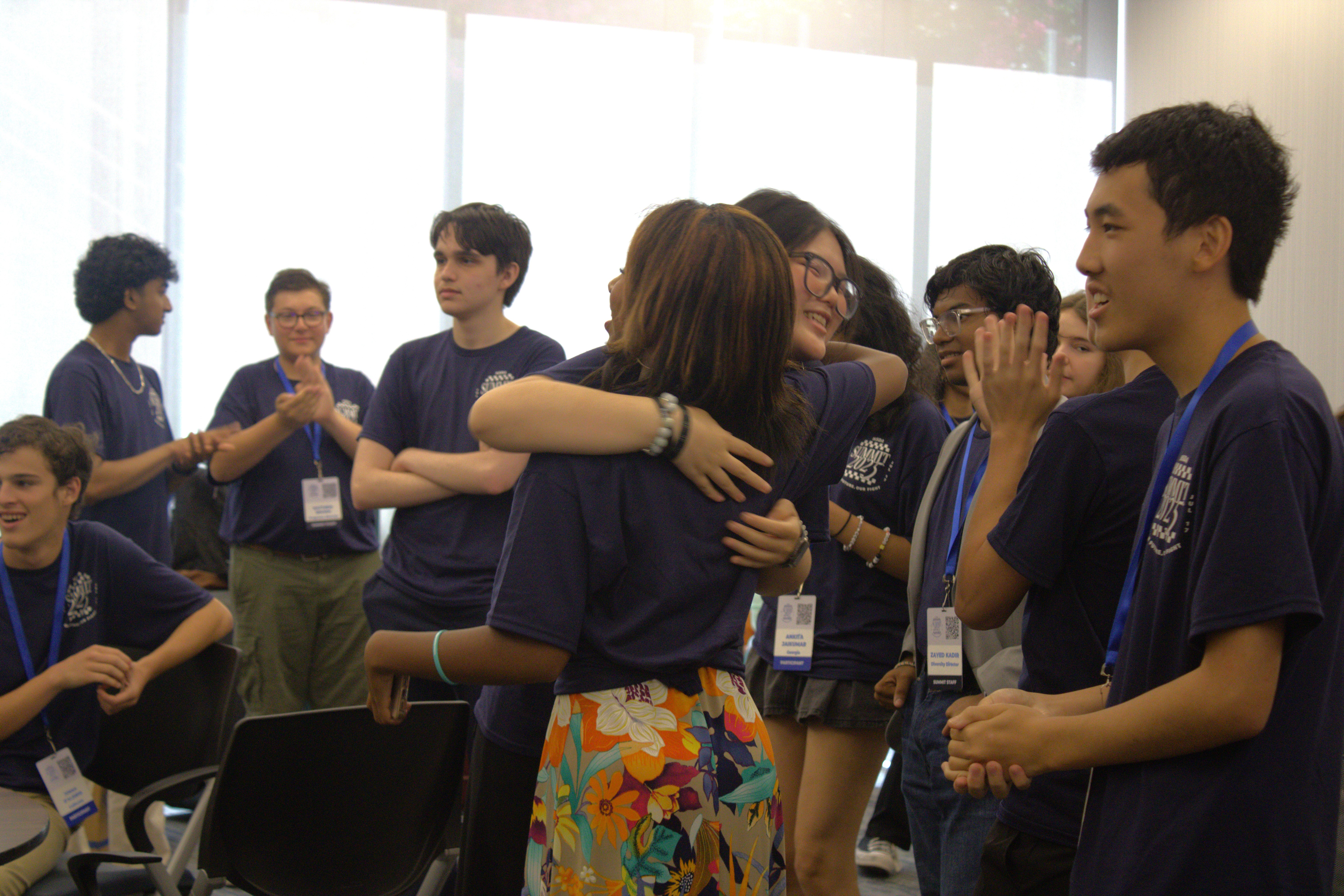
HSDA summit participants embrace on the final day of the 2025 national summit.

Since 2015, HSDA has hosted an annual summit in Washington, D.C., to train student activists and teach them to organize in their communities. HSDA has also garnered the attention of several notable politicians, including Sen. Cory Booker, Sen. Elizabeth Warren, Speaker of the House Nancy Pelosi, Rep. Alexandria Ocasio-Cortez, Rep. Ro Khanna and President Joe Biden. In 2020, 2021, and 2022, the National Summit was virtual due to various reasons including the COVID-19 pandemic. In 2024, the summit returned to an in-person format.

=== Legislative and issue-based advocacy ===
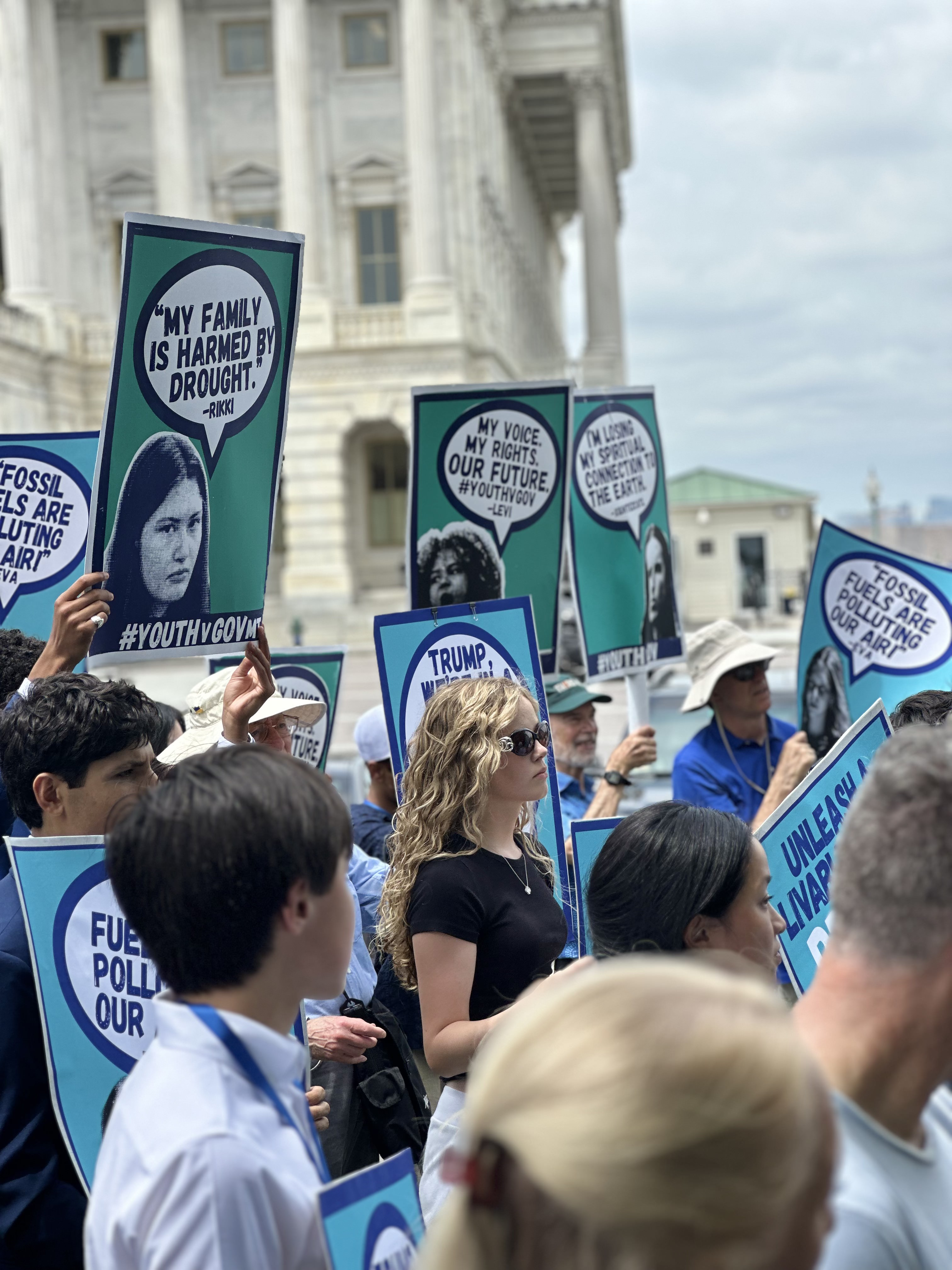
Members of HSDA at a rally supporting the youth plaintiffs of Lighthiser v. Trump. HSDA served as one of the advocacy groups helping to coordinate and mobilize student support for the rally.

In addition to electoral politics, HSDA and its members actively lobby for state legislation and engage in issue-based activism. Local chapters have successfully mobilized to support state laws that grant public school students excused absences to participate in civic engagement and protests. Members have also joined state-level movements advocating to lower the voting age to 16 for local municipal elections. At the national level, HSDA hosts an annual Hill Day coinciding with its national summit, where members partner with organizations such as Our Children's Trust to advocate for HSDA-endorsed federal legislation. The national organization also features a federal policy director who lobbies for these endorsed bills on Capitol Hill.

HSDA has been a lead co-sponsor on several non-binding resolutions at the DNC regarding dark money spending, abolishing ICE and foreign policy, notably pushing for ceasefire resolutions and arms embargoes regarding the Gaza War.

== See also ==
- College Democrats
- College Democrats of America
- Democratic Party (United States)
- Law School Democrats of America
- Young Democrats of America
- Teen Age Republicans
