= William C. Andrews =

American politician

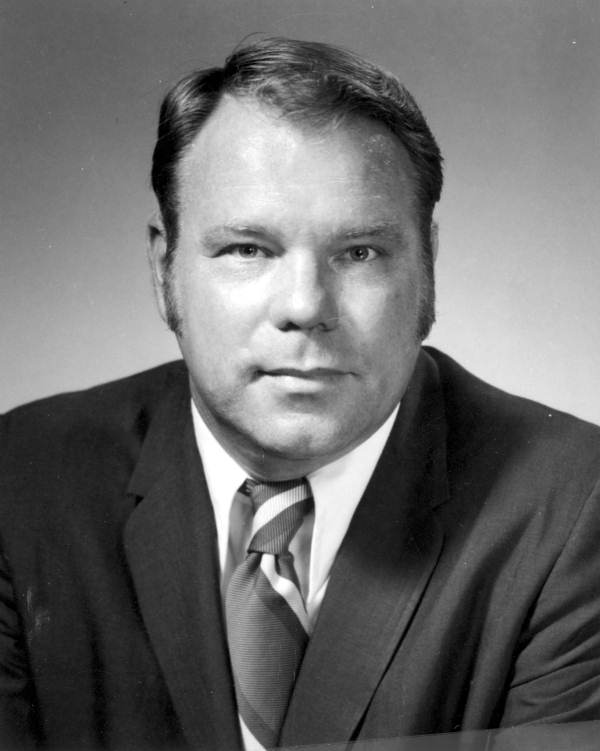
- Andrews in 1972

Member of the Florida House of Representatives from the 27th district
- In office November 7, 1972 – November 7, 1978
- Preceded by: Frank Carlucci
- Succeeded by: Jon L. Mills

Member of the Florida House of Representatives from the 31st district
- In office 1967– November 7, 1972
- Preceded by: district created
- Succeeded by: J. Hyatt Brown

Member of the Florida House of Representatives from the Alachua-Gilchrist-Putnam district
- In office 1966 - 1967

Personal details
- Born: January 24, 1934 Tampa, Florida, U.S.
- Died: March 4, 2021 (aged 87)
- Party: Democratic
- Occupation: attorney

William C. "Bill" Andrews (January 24, 1934 – March 4, 2021) was an American politician in the state of Florida.

Andrews was born in Tampa, Florida. He attended the University of Florida's Warrington College of Business Administration, receiving a degree in business administration in 1955. He later attended the University of Florida Law School and earned a Bachelor of Laws (LLB) degree in 1958. In college, he was a member of Sigma Alpha Epsilon. He married Dodie Platt and has three children. Andrews served as a Democrat in the Florida House of Representatives from 1967 to November 7, 1972, representing the 31st district, and from November 7, 1972, to November 7, 1978, this time representing the 27th district. In 1978, he received a Distinguished Alumni Award from the Warrington College of Business Administration.

Andrews died on March 4, 2021, at the age of 87.
