= Albert J. Farrah =

American lawyer and academic (1863–1944)

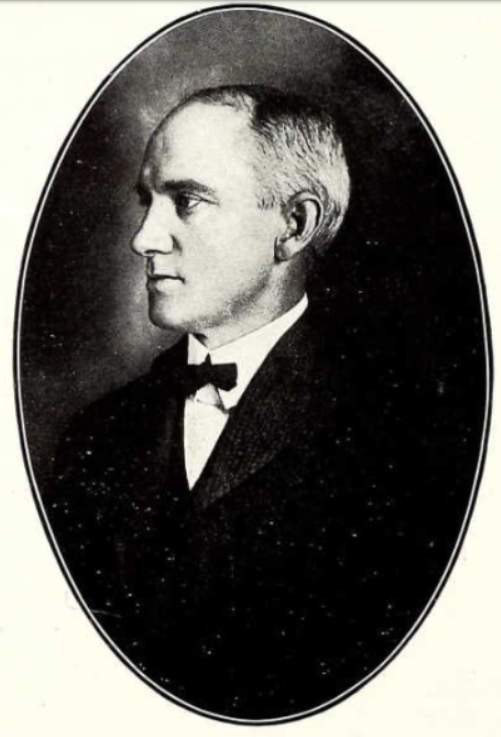
Farrah in 1911

Albert John Farrah (1863 – June 29, 1944) was the founding law school dean at Stetson University and the University of Florida Levin College of Law's first dean when created in 1909. He then served as dean of the University of Alabama's law school where he served for three decades until shortly before his death.

He was born in Adrian, Michigan in 1863 and studied at Adrian College and then Cornell College in Iowa. He graduated from the University of Michigan Law School in 1900. He then practiced in Battle Creek, Michigan for two years before being invited back to teach at the University of Michigan Law School. Farrah then became the Dean at Stetson University from 1900 to 1909 then the dean at the University of Florida Levin College of Law from 1909 to 1912.

Farrah finally ended up at The University of Alabama School of law in 1912. Farrah served as dean until 1944. Under his leadership the law school's library increased to over 20,000 volumes and was formally accredited by the American Bar Association. The newly built University of Alabama's Farrah Hall law building was dedicated to him in 1927.

He wrote Cases on the law of husband and wife.

He died in Tuscaloosa, Alabama on June 29, 1944.

In 2004, Farrah was inducted into the Alabama Lawyer's Hall of Fame. In 2011, he was inducted into Stetson College of Law's Hall of Fame.
