= Jim King (politician) =

American politician

James E. King
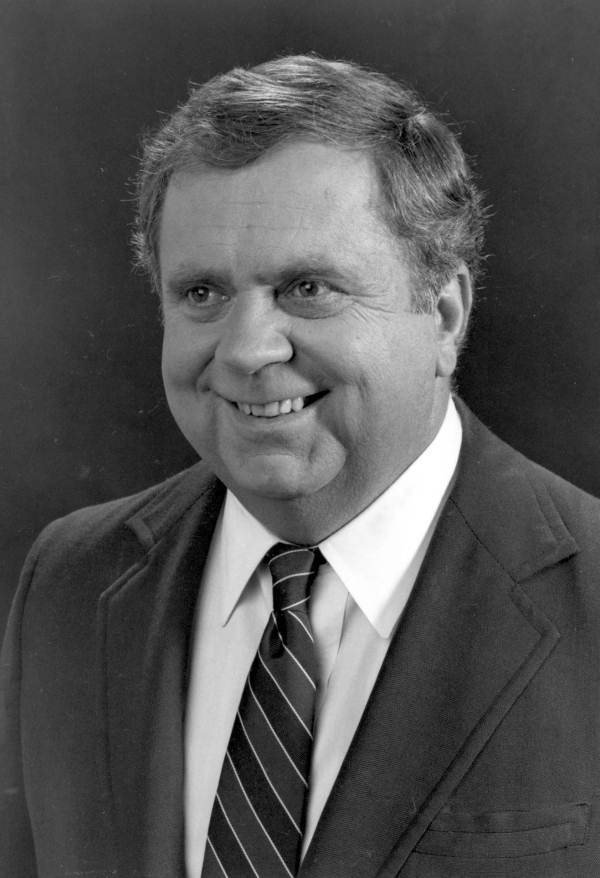
- King in 1986

President of the Florida Senate
- In office November 19, 2002 – November 16, 2004
- Preceded by: John M. McKay
- Succeeded by: Tom Lee

Member of the Florida Senate from the 8th district
- In office March 9, 1999 – July 26, 2009
- Preceded by: Bill Bankhead
- Succeeded by: John Thrasher

Personal details
- Born: October 30, 1939 Brooklyn, New York, U.S.
- Died: July 26, 2009 (aged 69) Jacksonville, Florida, U.S.
- Party: Republican
- Spouse: Linda Braddock
- Profession: Politician

James E. King (October 20, 1939 – July 26, 2009) was an American businessman and politician. A Republican, he was a member of Florida House of Representatives from 1986 through 1999, and subsequently represented the 8th District of the Florida Senate from 1999 until his death. He served as President of the Florida Senate from 2002 to 2004 and served as the Majority Leader from 2000 to 2002.

== Early years ==
King was born in Brooklyn, New York, and moved with his family to Florida in 1945, where he became the first member of his family to graduate from high school He attended Florida State University where he earned bachelor's and master's degrees. He married the former Linda Braddock. He has a daughter, Laurie Anne, from his first marriage to Eileen and a daughter, Monta Michelle, from his second marriage to Dorothy King. King had a rocky start in business, nearly going bankrupt twice before he mortgaged his home in 1969 to start an employment service agency, which was successful. In 1997, he sold the company for $15 million and focused on his political career, which began in 1986.

== Politics ==
King was elected to the Florida House of Representatives in 1986. He was elected to the Florida Senate in 1999 and was the president of the senate from 2003 to 2004.

In 2006, he was opposed in the Republican primary election by Randall Terry, a prominent anti-abortion activist who had opposed him on the Schiavo matter.

Another of King's achievements as senator was his legislation on pet burial, which allowed pet owners to be buried with their furry friends.

== Death ==
In May 2009, King was diagnosed with pancreatic cancer, but the following month, announced that he was cancer-free. In mid-July, his family announced that the disease had spread and he entered a hospice program. Jim King died on Sunday, July 26, 2009.

== Education ==
- Florida State University, B.A., 1961, B.S., 1961, M.B.A., 1962
- St. Petersburg Junior College, A.A., 1959

== Legacy ==
In 2008 The James E. King Life Sciences Building was opened on the Florida State University campus. At the dedication ceremony then university president T. K. Wetherell had this to say about Senator King:

Senator Jim King, a proud alumnus of this university, has been an enthusiastic and long-term supporter of Florida State who is dedicated to higher education and to advances in biomedical research, and it is therefore fitting that we are naming our wonderful new building in his honor. In fact, Jim was instrumental in helping us to secure the funds for this essential facility. It stands today as a testament to his regard for FSU and his commitment to our students and faculty and the citizens of this state, all of whom will benefit from the enhanced opportunities here for top-notch science education and research.

Florida House of Representatives
Preceded by John Lewis	Member of the Florida House of Representatives from the 18th district 1986–1992	Succeeded by Joseph "Joe" Arnall
Preceded by Corrine Brown	Member of the Florida House of Representatives from the 17th district 1992–1999	Succeeded by Jim Tullis
Florida Senate
Preceded by Bill Bankhead	Member of the Florida Senate from the 8th district 1999–2009	Succeeded by John Thrasher
Political offices
Preceded by John McKay	President of the Florida Senate; 2002–2004	Succeeded by Tom Lee
