= John Lewis (Florida politician) =

American politician

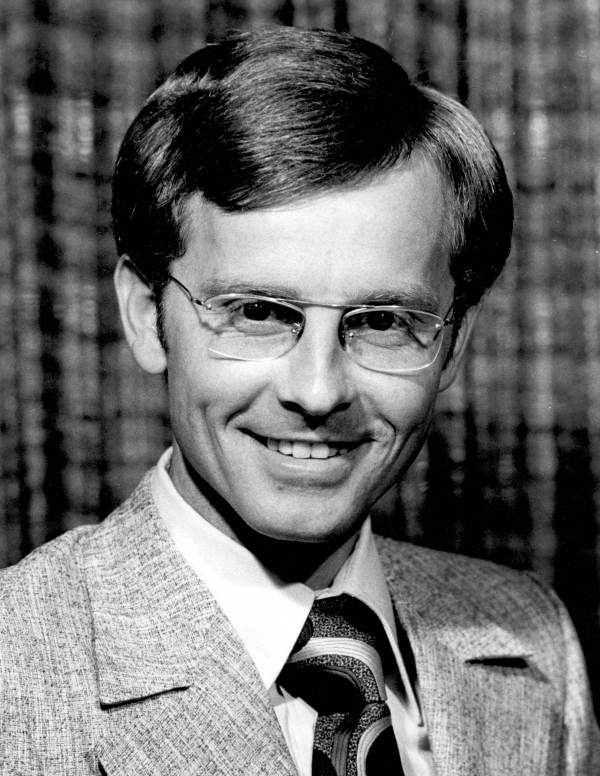

Member of the Florida House of Representatives from the 18th district
- In office 1974–1986
- Preceded by: Frank Carlucci
- Succeeded by: Jim King

Personal details
- Born: August 5, 1949 (age 77) Marietta, Georgia, U.S.
- Party: Democratic
- Education: Florida Junior College
- Occupation: Investments

John W. Lewis III (born August 5, 1949) is a former American politician in the state of Florida.

Lewis was born in Georgia and came to Florida with his family in 1950. He served in the Florida House of Representatives for the 18th district from 1974 to 1986, as a Democrat.

Florida House of Representatives
Preceded by Frank Carlucci	Member of the Florida House of Representatives from the 18th district 1974–1986	Succeeded by Jim King
