= Donald G. Nichols =

American politician

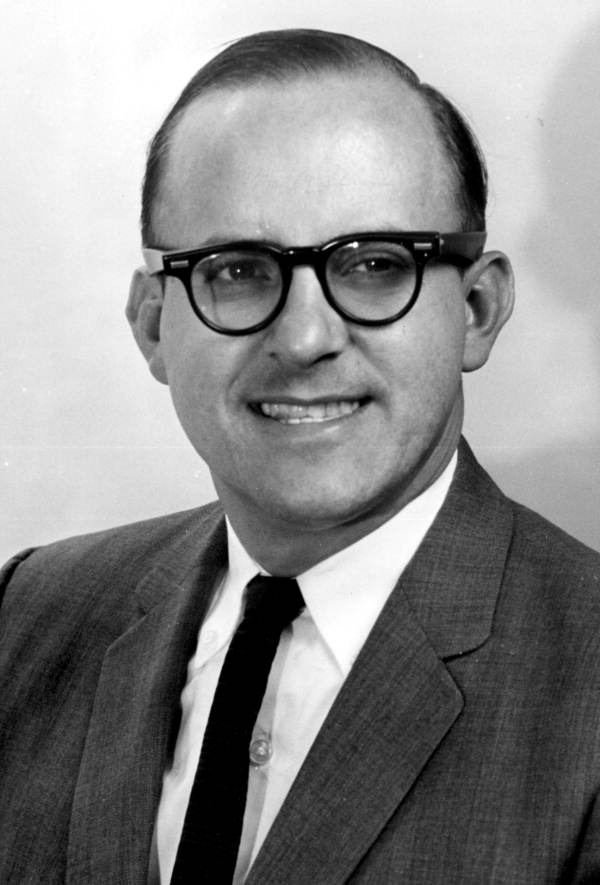

Member of the Florida House of Representatives from the 27th district
- In office 1966 – December 1, 1971
- Succeeded by: Frank Carlucci

Personal details
- Born: July 14, 1931 (age 95) Chattanooga, Tennessee, U.S.
- Party: Democratic
- Education: University of Florida
- Occupation: Attorney

Donald Gilbert Nichols (born July 14, 1931) is an American former politician in Florida. He served in the Florida House of Representatives from 1966 to 1971, representing the 27th district.

Nichols attended the University of Florida Law School, graduating in 1960.
