= College Democrats of America =

College student wing of the U.S. Democratic Party

- President: Amelia Sofos (HI)
- Executive Vice President: David Seaton (MA)
- Headquarters: 430 South Capitol St. SE, Washington, D.C., 20003
- Ideology: Modern liberalism
- Mother party: Democratic Party
- Website: collegedemocratsofamerica.com

The College Democrats of America (CDA) is the official college outreach arm of the Democratic National Committee.

== History ==
The organizational structure of the College Democrats of America (CDA) has changed significantly since its founding in 1932. The College Democrats of America organization was founded in 1932 to further the election campaign of presidential nominee Franklin D. Roosevelt. On August 24, 1935, President Franklin Roosevelt delivered his first of many radio addresses to the Young Democrats of America clubs.

After several years, President Lyndon Johnson proclaimed the week of September 6 as college students' registration week, thus calling attention to the challenges and importance of registering college students. The Young Democratic Clubs of America continue to register college students across America.

Founded as a branch of the Democratic National Committee (DNC), the group became independent following its split with Lyndon B. Johnson over the Vietnam War.

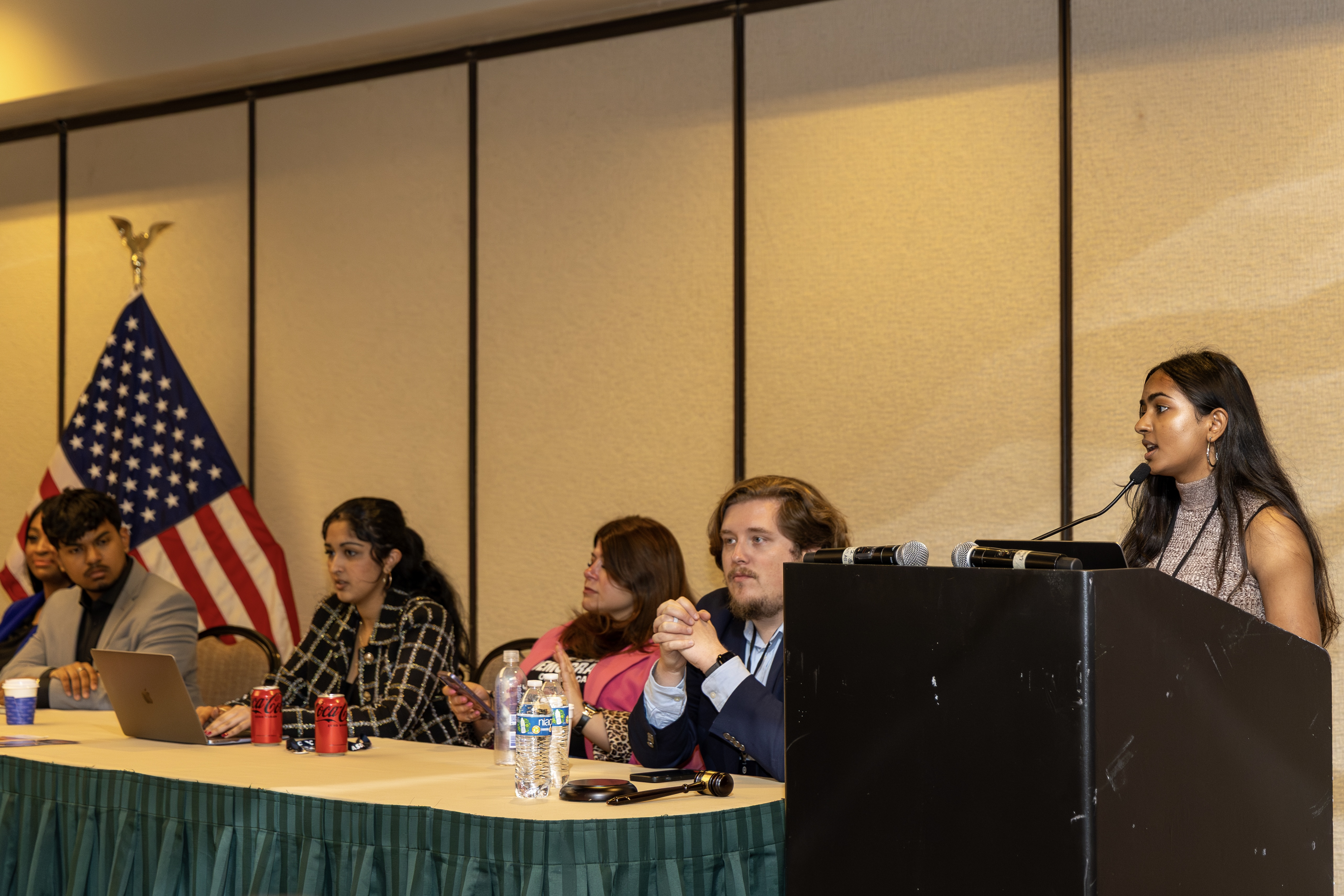
CDA President Sohali Vaddula addresses the DNC Youth Council during the DNC Spring Meeting in New Orleans, Louisiana, in 2026.

By 1988, members of the College Young Democrats of America planned to split from the Young Democrats of America due to the age and interest difference between college students and young professionals. With the support of then-Senator Al Gore, they organized a 1988 convention in Nashville where a constitution for the new CDA was approved and David Hale was elected the first President of the CDA. Following the efforts by Senator Gore and Executive Director Jonathan Miller, and officers Alex Haught, Silas Deane, Matt Pinsker, and Abe Amoros, the DNC accepted the CDA as their official youth outreach branch.

Since 1992, CDA has actively promoted the Democratic legislative agenda and Democratic candidates for office. Thanks in part to the work of CDA activists, John Kerry won 54% of the total votes of those aged between 18 and 29 in 2004. CDA continues to have a large presence today, with college chapters across America. At the 2012 Democratic National Convention in Charlotte, NC former CDA President Alejandra C. Salinas (2010–2012) delivered a speech in support of President Barack Obama.

In June 2020, in the aftermath of the murder of George Floyd, several National Executive Board members resigned from the organization after allegations of racism and classism throughout the organization. These ongoing allegations resulted in over forty federations jointly calling on the organization to adopt a series of institutional reforms. CDA President Mikaela Guido and CDA Vice President Ethan Smith subsequently resigned.

In July 2026, the CDA featured socialist live streamer Hasan Piker as a "surprise speaker" at their national convention.

=== Internal tensions over Israel ===
In 2014, several CDA officers engaged what was described as "the most notorious, and public, example of inter-party tensions" over Israel when Giovanni Hashimoto, then a CDA officer, faced backlash from anti-Israel CDA officers for defending Israel's actions during the 2014 Israel–Gaza conflict. The spat resulted in the resignation of Evan Goldstein, an officer who had compared Israeli Prime Minister Benjamin Netanyahu to Genghis Khan.

In 2024 CDA received widespread media attention for their statement in solidarity with the 2024 pro-Palestinian protests on university campuses. Numerous chapters across the United States participated in the campus protests, although there was a notable opposition amongst membership.

== Activities ==
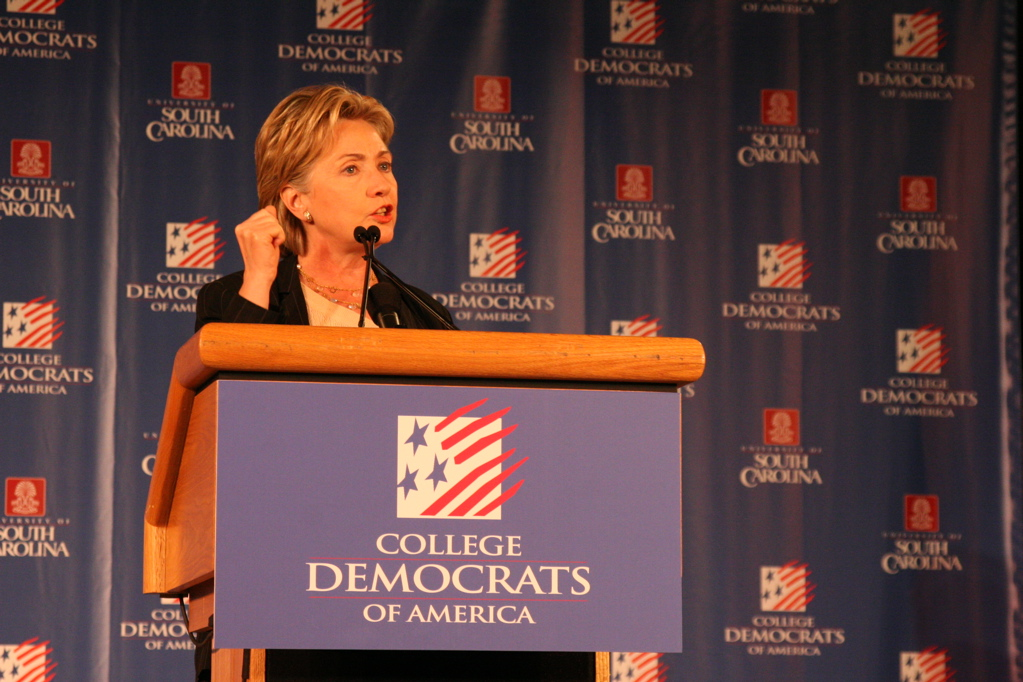
Hillary Clinton addresses the 2007 CDA National Convention.

Every year, the national organization of the CDA holds a national convention. These conventions include meetings for CDA's standing committees (like the constitution committee) and CDA's national caucuses (like the women's caucus) as well as the elections for CDA's National Executive Board. The convention also offers workshops on how to be effective in government and campaigning, and prominent speakers from the national Democratic party (previous speakers have included Bill Clinton, Al Gore, Hillary Clinton, Barack Obama, John Edwards, Nancy Pelosi, members of Congress, and Cabinet members). The CDA convention that occurs during presidential election years is typically held in conjunction with the Democratic National Convention.

== Organization ==
Colleges across America organize Democratic chapters at the local level. Many of these then charter with state federations (such as the California College Democrats, and Texas College Democrats) for support and to unite college Democrats within each state. Many state federations then charter with the College Democrats of America or the Young Democrats of America.

The national organization is overseen by the CDA Executive Board, which consists of the President, Executive Vice President, Vice President of Political Affairs, Vice President of Membership, and Vice President of Programs. The function of the Executive Board is officially to "determine and implement the organization's goals"; its members are elected annually at the national convention. Pursuant to the CDA Constitution, each local chapter receives one votes, each state federation receives four votes.

CDA is also guided by a National Council, which consists of one state officer from every state and territorial federation. The National Council serves as the highest authority of CDA between conventions and can overrule any actions taken by the Executive Board.

In addition, CDA has a network of national issue and identity caucuses. National identity caucuses represent specific groups within CDA, and often work with and support similar, state-level identity caucuses. Identity caucus officers are ex officio members of the National Council. All CDA members who identify as members of a minority group can vote in that minority group's caucus election, not solely chapter presidents and state federation officers – for example, all Black College Democrats can vote in the national Black Caucus election. CDA's list of national identity caucuses include the Black Caucus, Latinx Caucus, Women's Caucus, AAPI Caucus, Jewish Caucus, LGBTQ+ Caucus, Muslim Caucus, and Disability Caucus.

== Executive Board (2026-2027) ==
- President - Amelia Sofos, Hawaii
- Executive Vice President - David Seaton, Massachusetts
- Vice President of Membership - Carmen Campbell, Arkansas
- Vice President of Political Affairs - Conner Brumley, Kentucky
- Vice President of Programs - Maria Alejandra Fernandez, Florida
- Council of Caucuses Chair - Tate Jordan, District of Columbia

== See also ==
- Law School Democrats of America
- College Democrats
- Young Democrats of America
- High School Democrats of America
