= Frank Carlucci (Florida politician) =

American politician

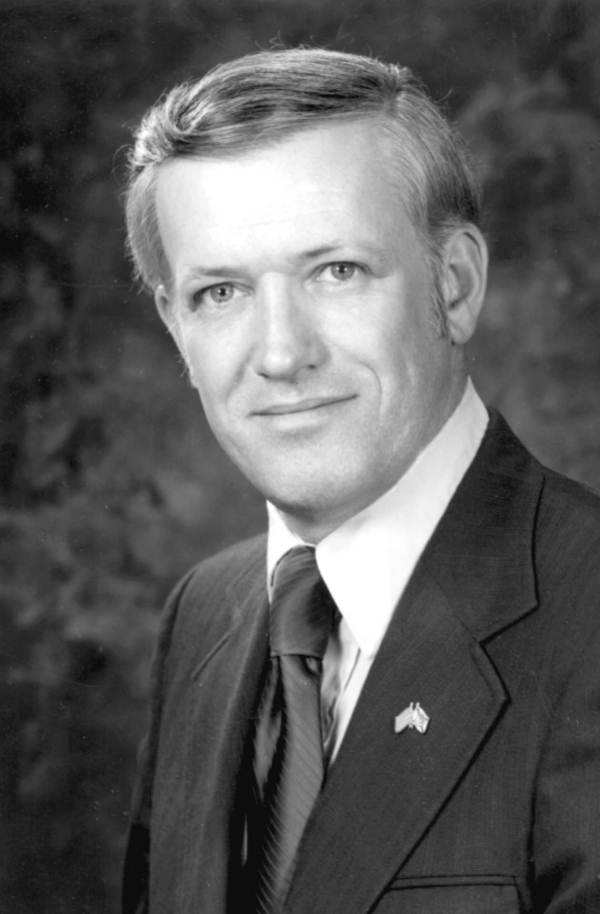
- Carlucci in 1972

Member of the Florida House of Representatives from the 27th district
- In office 1971–1972
- Preceded by: Don Nichols
- Succeeded by: William C. Andrews

Member of the Florida House of Representatives from the 18th district
- In office 1972–1974
- Preceded by: Hugh J. Grainger Jr.
- Succeeded by: John Lewis

Personal details
- Born: Francis Joseph Carlucci Carlisle; April 11, 1927 The Bronx, New York, U.S.
- Died: March 2, 2012 (aged 84)
- Party: Democratic

Francis Joseph Carlucci Carlisle (April 11, 1927 – March 2, 2012) was an American politician. He served as a Democratic member for the 18th and 27th district of the Florida House of Representatives.

== Life and career ==
Carlucci was born in The Bronx, New York. He served in the United States Navy during World War II.

Carlucci was a civil service board member.

In 1971, Carlucci was elected to represent the 27th district of the Florida House of Representatives, succeeding Don Nichols. He served until 1972, when he was succeeded by William C. Andrews. In the same year, he was elected to represent the 18th district, succeeding Hugh J. Grainger Jr. He served until 1974, when he was succeeded by John Lewis.

Carlucci died on March 2, 2012, at the age of 84.
