= Young Democrats of America =

Youth wing of U.S. Democratic Party

- President: Fatima Heyward (NJ)
- Founded: March 4, 1932; 94 years ago
- Headquarters: Washington, D.C.
- Ideology: Modern liberalism
- Mother party: Democratic Party
- International affiliation: International Federation of Liberal Youth
- Website: yda.org

The Young Democrats of America (YDA) is the youth wing of the Democratic Party of the United States. YDA operates as a separate organization from the Democratic National Committee; following the passage of the Bipartisan Campaign Reform Act, it became an independent 527 organization. The group's membership consists of Democrats from ages 14 to 35, and its political activities include an emphasis on increasing the voter turnout of young people.

== Leadership ==
YDA membership elects seven national officers on a biennial basis at the organization's National Convention in odd-numbered years and two DNC representatives in even-numbered years. These officers maintain the day-to-day management of the organization. Most recently, officers were elected at the 2025 YDA National Convention in Philadelphia.

Between national conventions, the governing body of YDA is the National Committee which is composed of the president and two national committee representatives from each chartered unit, along with the chairs of the twelve constituency caucuses, eight regional directors, eight chairs of select committees, and the nine individually elected officers.

The President, Democratic National Committeeman, and Democratic National Committeewoman are members of the Democratic National Committee, and superdelegates to any Democratic National Convention occurring during their terms.

=== 2025–2027 National Officers ===
- President: Fatima Heyward of New Jersey
- Executive Vice President: Lezlie Braxton Campbell of Massachusetts
- Eastern Vice President: Isaac Kaufer of Massachusetts
- Southern Vice President: Blake Robinson of Georgia
- Midwest Vice President: James Wells of Indiana
- Western Vice President: Parshan Khosravi of California
- Secretary: Maria Nieto Orta of Nevada
- Treasurer: Sam Jane of Virginia

=== 2025–2027 Democratic National Committee Members ===
- Democratic National Committee Representative: Steph Campanha Wheaton of New Jersey
- Democratic National Committee Representative: Stephon Moore of Kentucky

=== Ex officio national officers ===
- Chair of the Association of Chartered Unit Presidents: Allison Wiseman of Kentucky
- Chair of the Council of Caucus Chairs: Leslie Templeton of Massachusetts

=== Past leaders ===
Democratic party leaders and Democratic elected officials who are former YDA national officers include:

- Steny Hoyer – U.S. representative from Maryland
- Warren Magnuson – Former U.S. senator from Washington
- Allan Turner Howe – Former U.S. representative from Utah
- Mark Stodola – Former Mayor of Little Rock
- Chep Morrison – Former Mayor of New Orleans
- R. Spencer Oliver – Former Secretary General Parliamentary Assembly of the Organization for Security and Co-operation in Europe
- Maggie Toulouse Oliver – New Mexico secretary of state
- Chris Anderson – Former Chattanooga city councilman and Tennessee Democratic Party State Executive Committee member
- Lena Guerrero – Former member of the Texas House of Representatives
- Isaac Robinson – Former member of the Michigan House of Representatives
- Joe McDermott – King County councilor
- Elaine Marshall – North Carolina secretary of state

== National Convention, National Committee, and chartered units ==
The YDA organization is composed of "chartered units" with one from each U.S. state or territory. YDA holds a National Convention every two years during the summer of odd-numbered years with complex rules for how many votes each chartered unit may cast. The YDA National Committee meets at least two times per year and consists of the President of each chartered unit, two representatives of differing gender identities from each chartered unit, and a number of other officers and committee and caucus chairs.

=== National Convention locations ===
Past and Future YDA National Conventions were held in the below venues:

- 2025: Philadelphia, PA
- 2023: Las Vegas, NV
- 2021: Cincinnati, OH
- 2019: Indianapolis, IN
- 2017: Dallas, TX
- 2015: Los Angeles, CA
- 2013: San Antonio, TX
- 2011: Louisville, KY
- 2009: Chicago, IL
- 2007: Dallas, TX
- 2005: San Francisco, CA
- 2003: Buffalo, NY
- 2001: New York City, NY
- 1999: Little Rock, AR
- 1997: Miami, FL
- 1995: New Orleans, LA
- 1993: Merrillville, IN
- 1991: St Louis, MO
- 1989: Columbus, OH
- 1987: Phoenix, AZ
- 1985: Miami, FL
- 1983: Charleston, WV
- 1981: Richmond, VA

== See also ==
- College Democrats
- College Democrats of America
- Democratic Party (United States)
- High School Democrats of America
- Young Republicans
