= Joe Biden presidential campaigns =

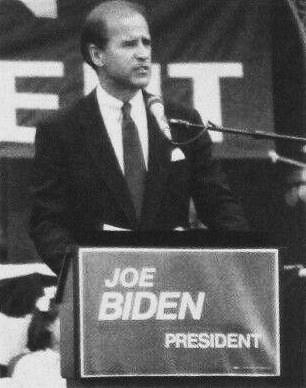
Biden at a campaign event in Iowa in 1987

Joe Biden, the 46th president of the United States (2021–2025), 47th vice president (2009–2017), and former United States senator from Delaware (1973–2009), has sought the presidency four times between 1988 and 2024. In his first two campaigns (1988 and 2008) he withdrew before or early during the Democratic Primaries. In 2015, there was media speculation that he would seek the presidency in the 2016 United States presidential election. Following the death of his son Beau, Biden ruled out a campaign stating that his "window for a successful campaign has closed". In his third (2020), he was elected president, defeating incumbent Donald Trump. In his fourth (2024), he won the Democratic primary but withdrew before the general election amid heavy public pressure due to his age and health.

Additionally, at the 1984 Democratic National Convention, Keron Kerr, an uncommitted delegate from Maine, voted for Biden to be the party's nominee in that year's presidential election. Kerr decided to vote for Biden after she enjoyed a speech of his at the state convention of the Maine Democratic Party.

== 1988 presidential campaign ==
In June 1987, Biden, then in his third term as a Senator, declared his intentions to run for president. Originally, Biden was regarded as potentially one of the strongest candidates in the field. However following reports that he had plagiarized a speech by Neil Kinnock, leader of the British Labour Party, he withdrew before the first contest of the 1988 Democratic Party presidential primaries.

The primary was won by Michael Dukakis who lost the general election to the Republican nominee, Vice President George H. W. Bush.

== 2008 presidential campaign ==
On January 31, 2007, Biden announced his candidacy for the 2008 United States presidential election. After finishing in fifth place in the Iowa caucus, held on January 3, 2008, garnering only one percent of the total vote, Biden ended his presidential bid. On August 23, 2008, Senator Barack Obama, the winner of the 2008 Democratic Party presidential primaries, selected Biden as his running mate.

The pair won the election, defeating Senator John McCain and Governor Sarah Palin; Biden was elected the 47th vice president of the United States.

== 2020 presidential campaign ==
On April 25, 2019, Biden released a video announcing his candidacy. He was initially considered to be among the strongest candidates in the 2020 Democratic Party presidential primaries, though his chances diminished after poor performances in the Iowa caucus and the New Hampshire primary. However, he was again considered the frontrunner after his landslide win in the South Carolina primary and on Super Tuesday. Following Senator Bernie Sanders' decision to suspend his campaign, Biden became the party's "presumptive nominee".

After winning the nomination, Biden, who pledged to have a female running mate, selected Senator Kamala Harris as his running mate. Harris was the third woman and the first person of color to be a major party vice presidential candidate. In the presidential election, Biden successfully defeated incumbent President Donald Trump; he broke the record set by Obama in 2008 for most votes cast for a presidential candidate. He was the first Democrat to win the states of Arizona and Georgia since Bill Clinton in the 1990s.

== 2024 presidential campaign ==
Biden intended to run for a second term in the 2024 United States presidential election. On April 25, 2023, Biden formally announced his reelection bid. Representative Dean Phillips of Minnesota's 3rd congressional district unsuccessfully challenged Biden in the 2024 Democratic Party presidential primaries. On March 12, 2024, Biden became the presumptive nominee for the 2024 Democratic nomination. Following a poor performance in the first 2024 presidential debate, heightened concerns about his age led to several major Democrats, including Senator Chuck Schumer and former Speaker of the House Nancy Pelosi, calling for Biden to exit the race. Despite his initial reluctance, on July 21, 2024, Biden withdrew his candidacy and endorsed Vice President Harris. Her campaign was ultimately unsuccessful and she lost the election to Trump.

In December 2024, Biden expressed regret for dropping out, stating that he believed he could have won.
