= College Democrats =

American student organization

College Democrats is an organization located on several college campuses. Their main focus is to elect Democratic Party candidates and provide networking and leadership opportunities for student members. The chapters have served as a way for college students to connect with the Democratic Party and Democratic campaigns, and has produced many prominent liberal and progressive activists.

Many of these chapters are organized under the College Democrats of America, the official youth outreach arm of the Democratic National Committee, which claims over 100,000 college and university student members from across the United States. Other chapters are organized under the Young Democrats of America and its College Caucus.

== Activities ==
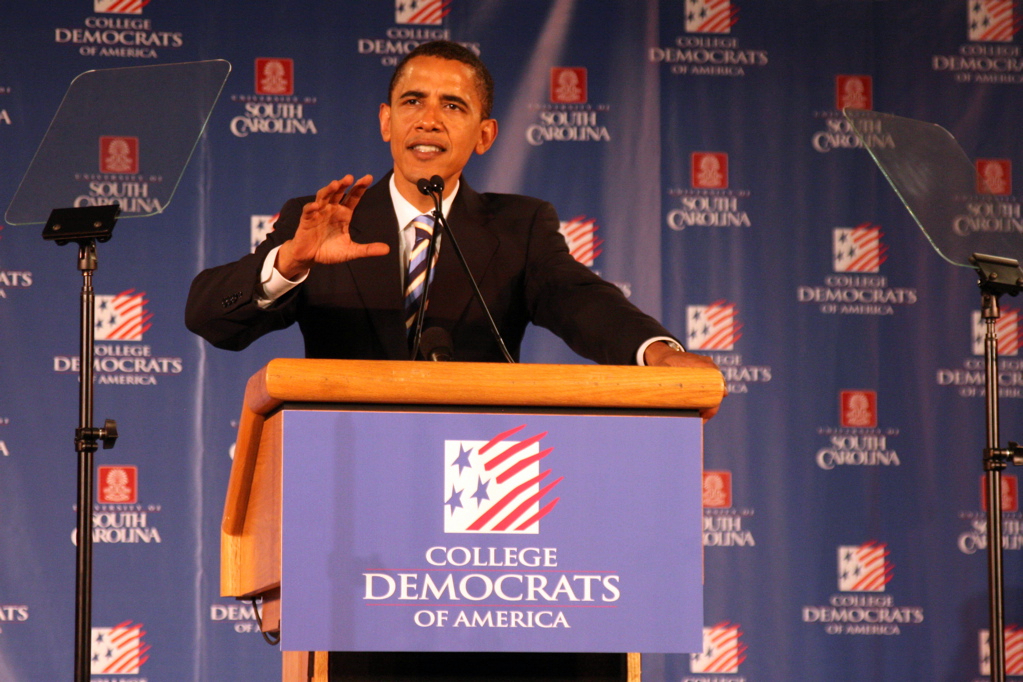
President Barack Obama, then a candidate in the Democratic Presidential Primary, addresses the 2007 CDA National Convention.

Immediately leading up to election day, chapters are expected to participate in get out the vote (GOTV) activities, both on-campus and in surrounding communities.

Other activities are not centrally determined, and thus vary from chapter to chapter. Typical activities might include inviting guest speakers (often elected officials or party activists) to campus, organizing issue advocacy and lobbying efforts (like letter-writing campaigns or phone banks), and arranging service activities for members to attend.

College Democrats chapters also often organize social events (like sporting competitions with College Republicans chapters) and other recruitment activities.

During the election season, campus chapters typically partake in campaign work. These efforts generally include voter registration drives and dorm storms to register youth voters that have just gained voter eligibility. They also include providing youth manpower to campaigns for canvassing and phone banks. During presidential election years, chapters have organized proxy debates and run mock elections.

=== Presidential Primaries ===
Many chapters of the College Democrats took part in the 2016 Democratic Primary between Secretary Hillary Clinton (D-NY) and Senator Bernie Sanders (I-VT). In the run-up to the campaign's launch, many students participated in Ready for Hillary PAC's efforts to build support for Clinton. The statewide organization in California actively supported the PAC and recruited supporters while many chapters hosted the PAC's Hillary Bus on their campuses to build support for Clinton.

== Notable College Democrats ==
Name	Notability	Campus
Madeleine Albright	former United States Secretary of State	Wellesley College
Bryce Bennett	member, Montana House of Representatives	University of Montana
Evan Bayh	former U.S. Senator from Indiana	
Howard Berman	former U.S. Representative from California	University of California, Los Angeles
Edward Casso	former member, Colorado House of Representatives	University of Colorado Boulder
David Cicilline	U.S. Representative from Rhode Island	Brown University
Mark B. Cohen	member, Pennsylvania House of Representatives	University of Pennsylvania
Lee Fang	investigative journalist	University of Maryland, College Park
Kirsten Gillibrand	U.S. Senator from New York	Dartmouth College
David J. Hale	United States Attorney for the Western District of Kentucky	
Marina Keegan	author, playwright, and journalist	Yale University
Chris Kelly	former Chief Privacy Officer of Facebook	
John F. Kennedy Jr.	son of President John F. Kennedy and Jacqueline Kennedy	Brown University
Amy Klobuchar	U.S. Senator from Minnesota	Yale University
Paul Krekorian	member, Los Angeles City Council	
Matt Lesser	former member, Connecticut State Senate	Wesleyan University
Scooter Libby	former Chief of Staff to Vice President Dick Cheney	Yale University
Marko Liias	member, Washington State Senate	Georgetown University
Seth Magaziner	U.S. Representative from Rhode Island	Brown University
Terry McAuliffe	Governor of Virginia and former chair of the Democratic National Committee	Catholic University of America
Jonathan Miller	former Kentucky State Treasurer	
John E. Moss	former U.S. Representative from California and California State Assembly Majority Leader	
Glenn Nye	former U.S. Representative from Virginia	Georgetown University
Nancy Pelosi	U.S. Representative from California and Democratic Leader, Speaker of the House	Trinity Washington University
Dan Pfeiffer	former senior advisor to President Barack Obama	Georgetown University
Hannah Pingree	former Speaker of the Maine House of Representatives	
Mark Pocan	U.S. Representative from Wisconsin	University of Wisconsin–Madison
Jason Rae	member, Democratic National Committee	Marquette University
Stephanie Herseth Sandlin	former U.S. Representative from South Dakota	
Brad Sherman	U.S. Representative from California	
Eric Swalwell	U.S. Representative from California	
Levar Stoney	Secretary of the Commonwealth of Virginia	James Madison University
Mark Takano	U.S. Representative from California	Harvard University
Jesse M. Unruh	former speaker of the California State Assembly and State Treasurer	
Alex Wagner	American Journalist	Brown University
Mark Warner	U.S. Senator from Virginia	
Steve Warnstadt	former member, Iowa Senate	Drake University
Debbie Wasserman-Schultz	Chair of the Democratic National Committee and U.S. Representative from Florida	University of Florida
Henry Waxman	U.S. Representative from California	
Nan Whaley	Mayor of Dayton, Ohio	

== See also ==
- Young Democratic Socialists of America
- Democratic Party
- Democratic National Committee
- High School Democrats of America
- College Republicans
