= University of Florida Levin College of Law =

Public law school in Gainesville, Florida, US

- Established: 1909; 117 years ago
- School type: Public
- Dean: Merritt McAlister
- Location: Gainesville, Florida, U.S.
- Enrollment: 662 (2023)
- Faculty: 85 (2023)
- USNWR ranking: 34th (tied) (2026)
- Bar pass rate: 90.6% (Florida bar exam, July 2024 first-time takers); 88.55% (2024 first-time takers, all jurisdictions)
- Website: law.ufl.edu
- ABA profile: Standard 509 Report
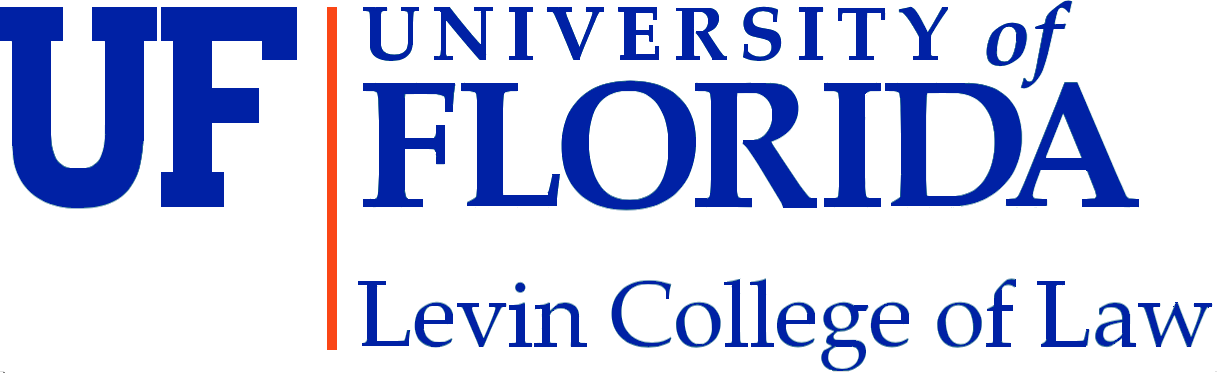

The University of Florida Levin College of Law (UF Law) is the law school of the University of Florida located in Gainesville, Florida. Founded in 1909, it is the oldest operating public law school in Florida and second oldest overall in the state.

For every entering class in its three-year J.D. program, the law school has approximately 200 students. According to the college's official 2024 ABA-required disclosures, 95% of graduates obtained employment in either bar-passage-required or JD-advantage employment within 9 months of graduation and 90% obtained bar-passage-required employment (i.e., as attorneys) within 9 months of graduation, the highest rates of any Florida law school. Levin students achieved the highest passage rate for first-time takers of all Florida law schools on the Florida summer 2024 bar exam.

Many prominent Florida political leaders, public servants, jurists, and law firm managers are among the school's alumni.

Merritt McAlister has served as Interim Dean since June 2023.

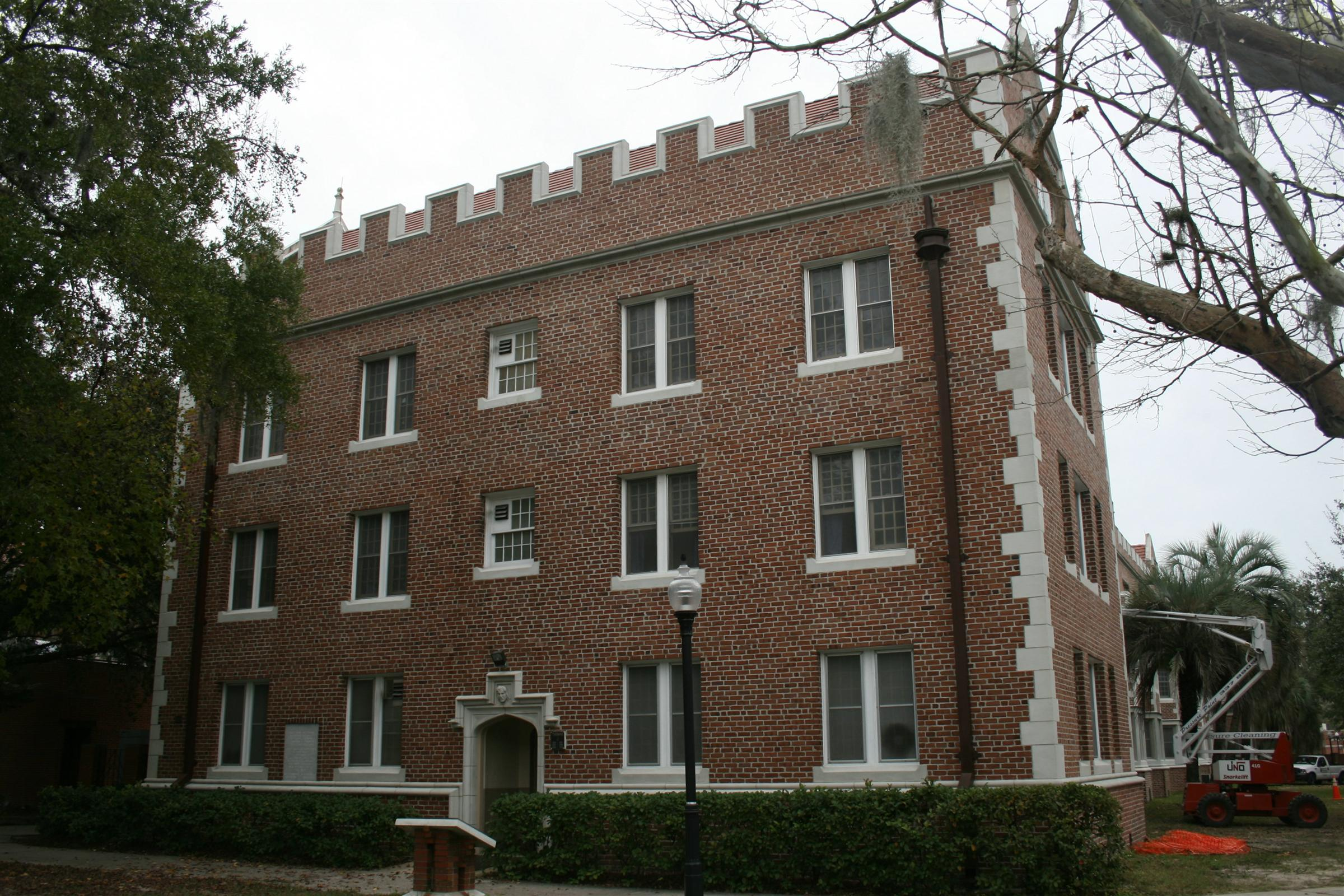
William R. Thomas Hall, home of the College of Law from 1909 to 1914

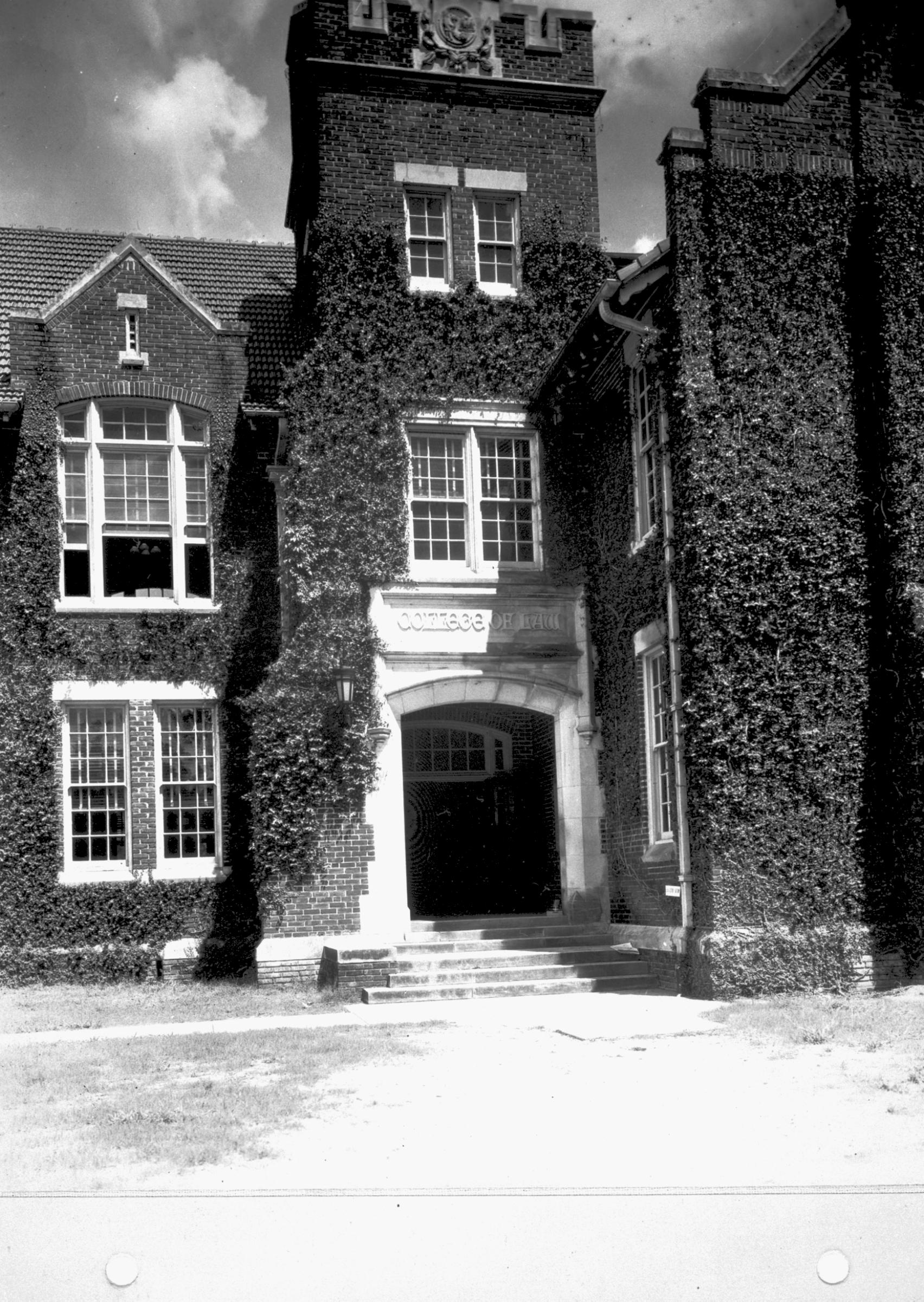
Nathan P. Bryan Hall, home of the College of Law from 1914 to 1969

== History ==
The College of Law was founded in 1909 with Albert J. Farrah as its first dean. It was first housed in Thomas Hall, and then in Bryan Hall from 1914 to 1969.

The school excluded African Americans. Virgil D. Hawkins was denied admission because he was African American in 1948. He appealed to the Florida Supreme Court and then the U.S. Supreme Court for relief. The college finally desegregated in the wake of his fight on September 15, 1958, and admitted an African-American student, and its faculty was desegregated shortly thereafter.

In 1969, the college moved to its current location in Holland Hall, which is named after the former Florida Governor, U.S. Senator, and alumnus Spessard L. Holland (LL.B. '16). Holland Hall is located in the northwest section of the university's campus. In 1984, Bruton-Geer Hall, named after the parents of alumnus Judge James D. Bruton (LL.B. '33) and his wife Quintilla Geer Bruton, was added to the law school complex.

The College of Law was renamed the Levin College of Law in 1999 after prominent Pensacola trial lawyer and alumnus Fredric G. Levin (J.D. '61), who donated $10 million to the college, a sum that was matched by a $10 million grant from the state of Florida to create a $20 million endowment.

The College of Law underwent a major renovation between 2004 and 2005, creating new academic space and expanding the law library, which was named the Lawton Chiles Legal Information Center after the former Florida Governor, U.S. Senator, and alumnus Lawton Chiles (LL.B. '55).

A new courtroom facility was completed in 2009. The facility, which was made possible by an additional $2 million donation from the Levin family, is named the Martin Levin Advocacy Center in honor of UF Law alumnus Martin H. Levin (J.D. '88), and son of Fred Levin. The facility is 20,000 square feet (1,900 m^{2}), two stories tall, and includes a state-of-the-art courtroom. Construction began on the second phase of the building (the second floor) in Fall 2010 and was completed in Fall 2011.

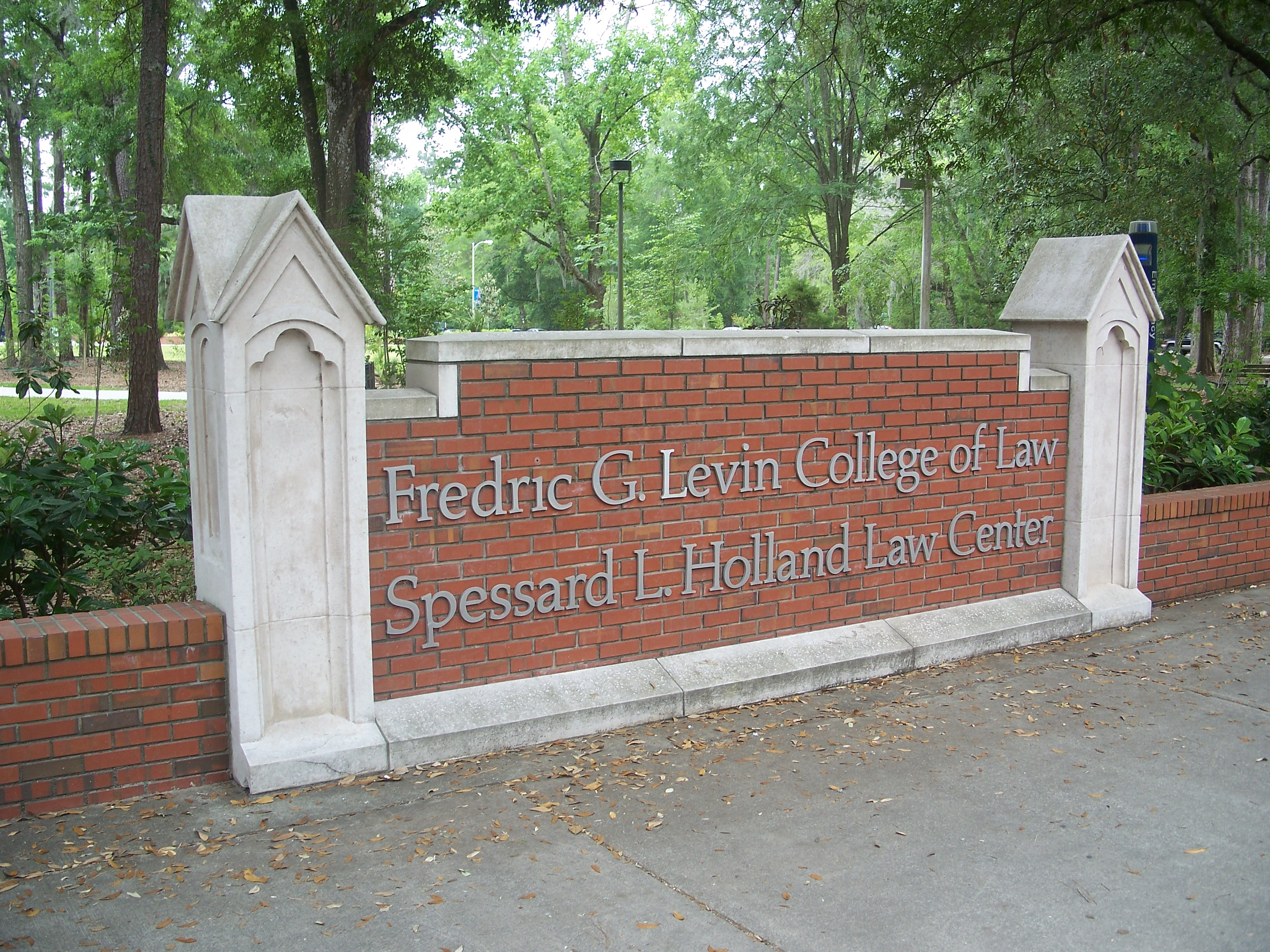
Fredric G. Levin College of Law & Spessard L. Holland Law Center

In 2024, the law school gave an award to a student paper arguing that "We the People" in the US Constitution protects only white people, calling for the removal of voting rights for non-white people, and contending that white people "cannot be expected to meekly swallow this demographic assault on their sovereignty." The author of the paper has publicly called for Jews to be "abolished by any means necessary." The law school's interim dean, Merritt McAlister, defended the decision to honor the student with the award. Later, the student acknowledged that his own grandfather and great-grandparents were Jewish, but claimed the identities of his ancestors were irrelevant to his thinking. Although he remains enrolled, he has since received a trespass order preventing him from setting foot on campus.

== Campus ==
The architectural style of Bruton-Geer Hall, completed in 1984, is best classified as brutalism; concrete features prominently in its design. The renovation of Holland Hall was completed in 2005 at the cost of $25 million and features brick and concrete.

The grounds of the College of Law contain several pieces of artwork. The newest additions are three metal sculptures by Jim Cole of the Rhode Island School of Design representing the three branches of government: The Legislative and The Executive (installed 2005) and The Judiciary (installed 2006). These sculptures also function as benches. The lobby of the law school library contains a sculpture made by Cole in the form of a chair entitled The Lobbyist.

Also contained on the grounds of the college are a series of large, intertwined metal rings, which have the appearance of being partially underground. They are known as "the Cheerios".

== Academics ==
The Levin College of Law offers a three-year, full-time program leading to a Juris Doctor (J.D.) degree. It also offers advanced law degrees, including Master of Laws (LL.M.) degree programs in taxation and international taxation, in addition to a Doctor of Juridical Science (S.J.D.) in taxation.

=== Rankings ===
According to the 2025 U.S. News & World Report law school rankings, the Levin College of Law was tied for 38th. It had been tied for 28th overall among American law schools in 2024, and 11th among public law schools. It places third in Tax Law among all law schools and first among public law schools, tied for No.85 in Clinical Training, tied for No.68 in Intellectual Property Law, and tied for No.66 in Legal Writing. The U.S. News & World Report ranks the Levin College of Law as the best law school in the state of Florida.

=== Admissions ===
For the class entering in 2022, the school accepted 681 (16.94%) of applicants, with 189 of those accepted enrolling, a 27.75% yield rate. Seven students were not included in the acceptance statistics. The class consists of 196 students. Of scores reported, the median LSAT score was 169 and the median undergraduate GPA was 3.90. Its 25th/75th percentile LSAT scores and GPA were 162/170 and 3.52/3.97. Eight students were not included in the LSAT calculation and seven not included in the GPA calculation. 33% of the incoming class are racially or ethnically diverse students, and 45% are women. The college currently only offers admission for the fall semester.

In 2026, the acceptance rate for the Class of 2029 had decreased to 13.5%. The class of 200 students had a median LSAT score of 170, with a 25th-75th percentile range from 167-171. The median GPA was 3.97, with a 25th-75th percentile range of 3.78-4.00. 30% of students came from out of state, representing 26 states and D.C. and 84 undergraduate institutions.

=== Coursework and programs ===
Required first-year courses are torts, criminal law, contracts, legal research and writing, constitutional law, civil procedure, property, introduction to lawyering, and appellate advocacy. Students are also required to take legal drafting and are recommended to take courses in evidence, estates and trusts, corporations, and trial practice.

Students can choose to pursue their J.D. in conjunction with another graduate degree, including a master's degree, Doctor of Philosophy (Ph.D.), or Doctor of Medicine (M.D.) in one of the university's dual-degree programs. Students can also complete specific requirements in addition to those required for the J.D. and earn a certificate indicating specialization in estate planning and trusts, family law, criminal law, intellectual property law, environmental and land use law, or U.S. law.

The College offers nine-month programs leading to the LL.M. degree in taxation or international taxation. The LL.M. in international taxation is open to graduates of both U.S. and foreign law schools. The College of Law also offers an S.J.D in taxation.

=== Centers ===
The Levin College of Law hosts five university-wide academic centers. In 1988, Law School professors Sharon Rush and Kenneth Nunn founded the Center for the Study of Race and Race Relations. Staff directors and professors from across the university advise the center and collaborate with law professors to research the intersection of race and the law. The Levin College of Law also hosts the Center for Government Responsibility, the state's oldest legal and public policy research institute. Former dean and emeritus professor Jon Mills founded the center in 1972 to study Richard Nixon's cut in funding to public housing and civil rights programs. The Levin College of Law also hosts centers on Children and Families, Estate Planning, and a Race and Crime Center for Justice.

== Bar examination passage ==
In 2023, the overall bar examination passage rate for the law school’s first-time examination takers was 81.94%. The first-time passage rate for the Florida bar examination was 80.6%. The Ultimate Bar Pass Rate, which the ABA defines as the passage rate for graduates who sat for bar examinations within two years of graduating, was 92.83% for the class of 2021.

== Employment ==
According to the University of Florida's official 2019 ABA-required disclosures: 80.6% of the Class of 2018 obtained full-time, long-term JD-required bar-passage-required employment (i.e. as attorneys) nine months after graduation. In addition, 7.5% obtained full-time, long-term employment where a J.D. is an advantage; 3.75% enrolled in graduate degree programs (predominantly in UF’s LL.M. taxation program, which is ranked third in the country by U.S. News & World Report); and 0.9% had their employment start date deferred or were unknown or not seeking employment. University of Florida's Law School Transparency under-employment score is 10.9%, indicating the percentage of the Class of 2018 unemployed, pursuing an additional degree (a large number of UF Law graduates pursue LL.M. degrees), or working in a non-professional, short-term, or part-time job nine months after graduation.

According to UF Law's official disclosures to the American Bar Association, nearly 85% of the Class of 2019 successfully obtained employment as attorneys licensed to practice law.

== Costs ==
The 2019-20 semester per credit hour tuition/fee for continuing law students who matriculated before fall 2018, is $743.31 (30 hours = $22,299.30) for Florida residents and $1,296.80 (30 hours = $38,904.00) for non-residents. The 2019-20 semester per credit hour tuition/fee for students who matriculated in fall 2018 and beyond will be part of the block tuition system. The rates are $21,803.76 for Florida residents and $38,039.47 for non-residents.

== Student life ==
=== Publications ===
The College of Law publishes the following law reviews:

- The Florida Law Review, the university's flagship publication
- The Florida Journal of International Law
- The University of Florida Journal of Law & Public Policy
- The Journal of Technology Law and Policy
- The Florida Entertainment & Sports Law Review
- The Florida Tax Review

=== Student organizations ===
The College of Law has over 40 active student organizations, including:

- Organizations devoted to interest in a specific area of law (art law, criminal law, military law, business law, public interest law, tax law, immigration law, real estate law, etc.)
- Political and social organizations (Law School Democrats, Law College Republicans, National Lawyers Guild, American Constitution Society)
- The Federalist Society at the College of Law is considered one of the preeminent chapters in the nation. The chapter hosted the Federalist Society's 33rd Annual National Student Symposium in the Spring of 2014.
- The John Marshall Bar Association (JMBA) was founded in 1909 and is one of the oldest organizations at the University of Florida.
- The Board
- Community service organizations for law students to use their legal skills to help the community (Volunteer Income Tax Assistance)
- Organization for students with a common background (Asian-Pacific American Law Student Association, Hispanic and Latino/Latina Law Student Association, Black Law Students Association, Jewish Law Students Association, Christian Legal Society, St. Thomas More Society, Lambda Legal, Law Association for Women, Spanish-American Law Students Association).

The College of Law has a mock trial team, which competes nationally. Additionally, it has four moot court teams:

- The Florida Moot Court Team, governed by the Justice Campbell Thornal Executive Board. It competes every semester in state, regional, national, and intramural competitions.
- The Tax Moot Court Team, which competes annually in multiple LL.M. and J.D. national and international Tax Moot Court Competitions.
- The International Commercial Arbitration Moot Court Team, competing in international arbitration
- The Environmental Moot Court Team competes annually at the National Environmental Law Moot Court Competition at Pace Law School.

== Notable alumni ==
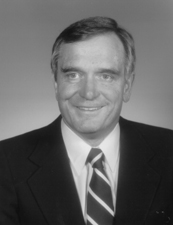
Lawton Chiles

The Fredric G. Levin College of Law has produced numerous United States Senators, fifteen members of the United States House of Representatives, many state governors, and a couple of United States Ambassadors. In the past forty years, four presidents of the American Bar Association were graduates of the college, more than any other law school for that period. Since 1950, over sixty percent of Florida Bar Association presidents were graduates of the college. Numerous alumni have served as judges on the federal bench, and five have served on the United States Court of Appeals. Seventeen graduates have served on the Florida Supreme Court, fifteen of them as chief justice. Eleven graduates have served as presidents of a college or university.

== Deans ==
Years	Dean
1909–1912	Albert J. Farrah
1912–1915	Thomas Hughes
1915–1947	Harry R. Trusler
1948–1958	Henry A. Fenn
1959–1970	Frank E. Maloney
1971–1980	Joseph R. Julin
1981–1988	Frank T. Read
1988–1996	Jeffrey E. Lewis
1996–1999	Richard A. Matasar
1999–2003	Jon L. Mills
2003–2014	Robert Jerry
2014–2015	George L. Dawson (Interim)
2015–2023	Laura Ann Rosenbury
2023–Present	Merritt McAlister (Interim)

== Gallery ==
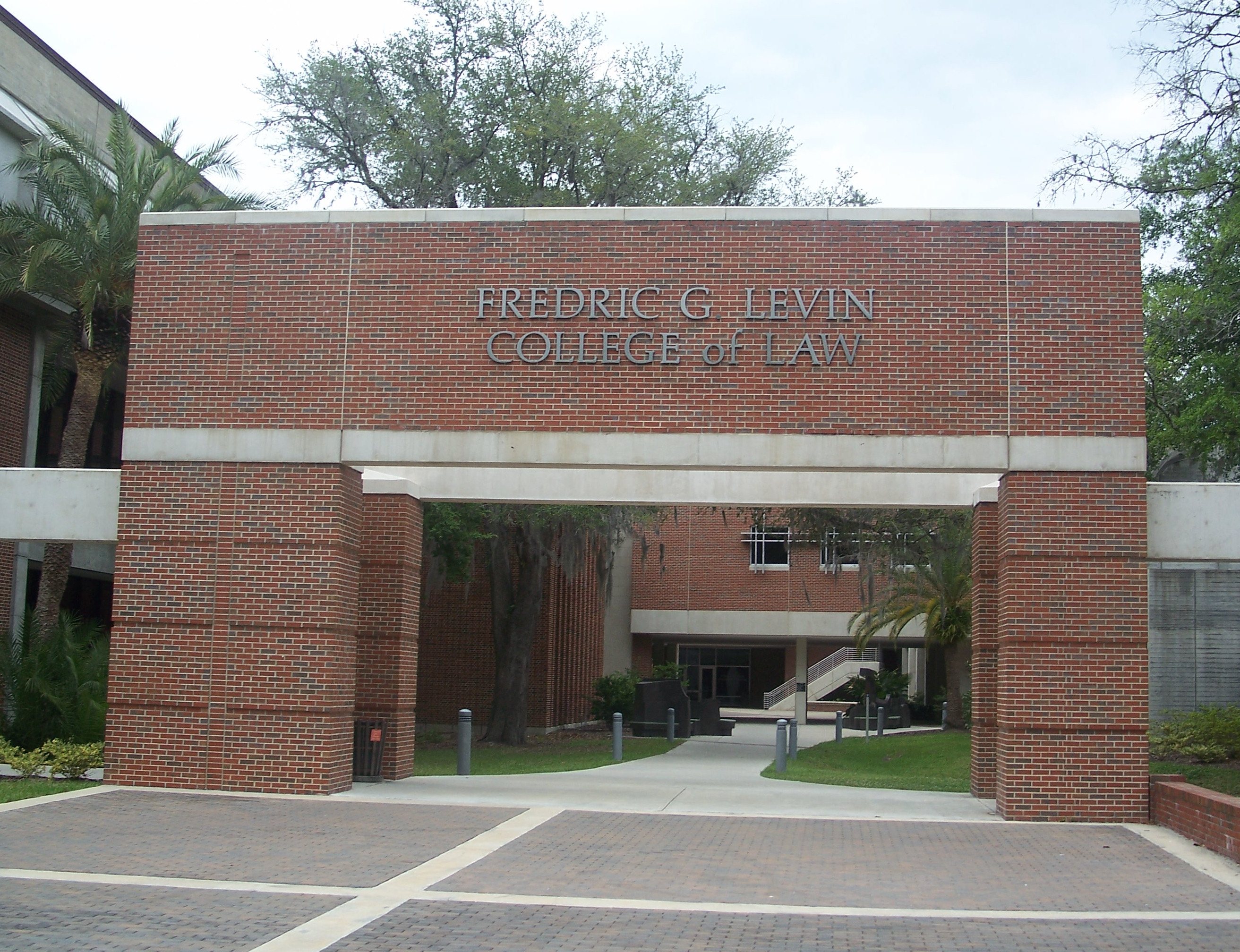
Entrance

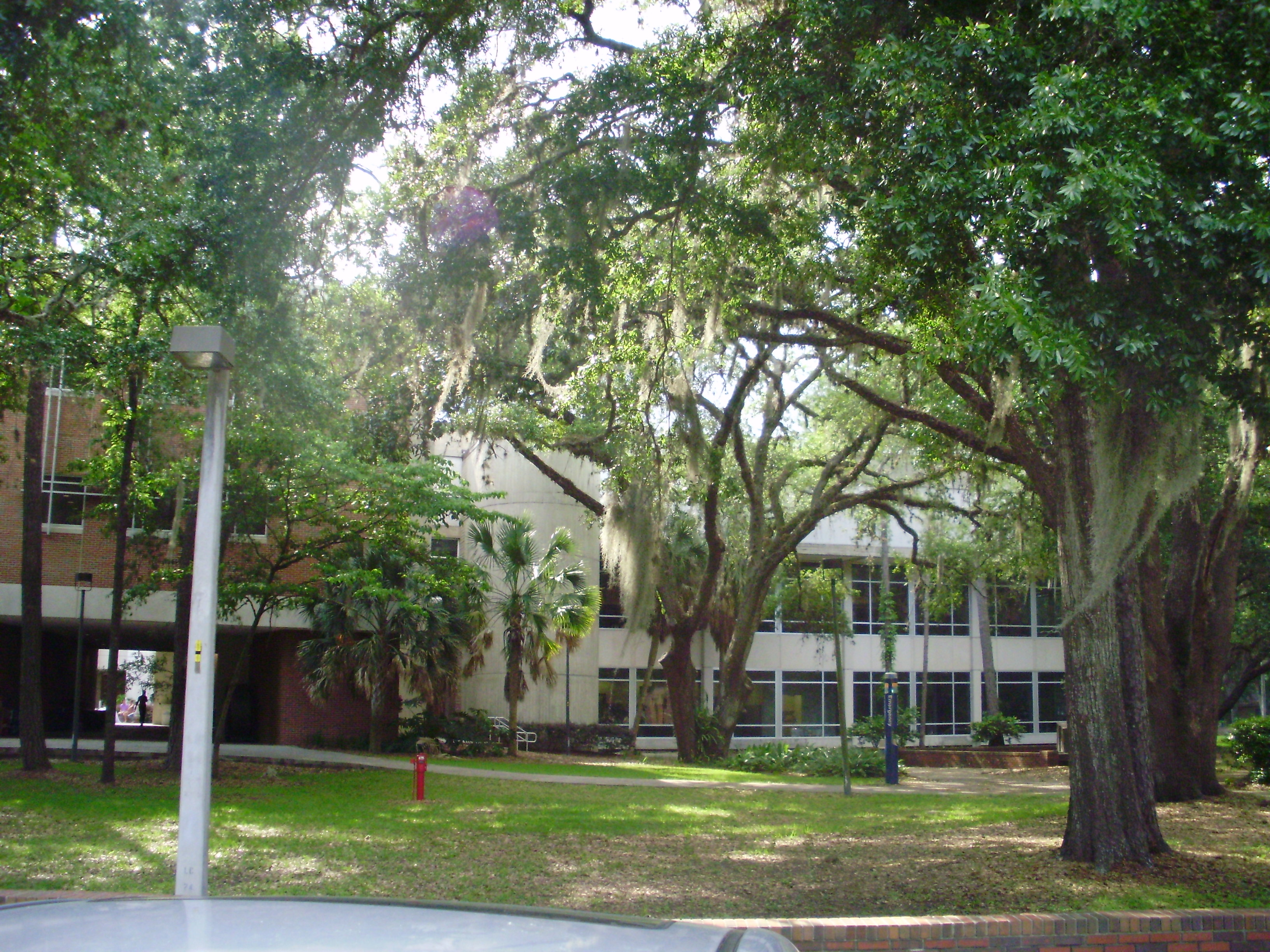
East side of Holland Law Center

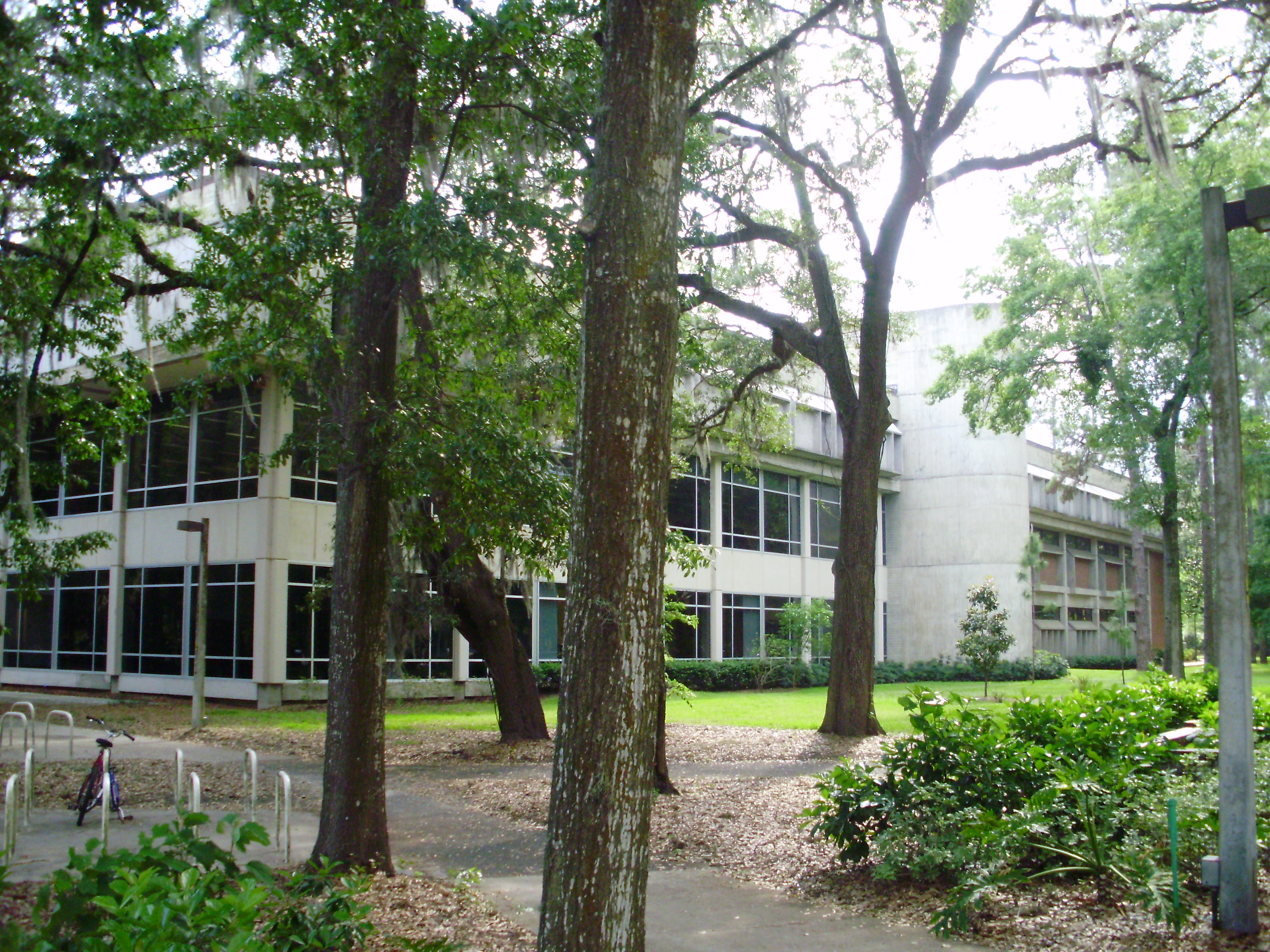
Northeast corner of Holland Law Center

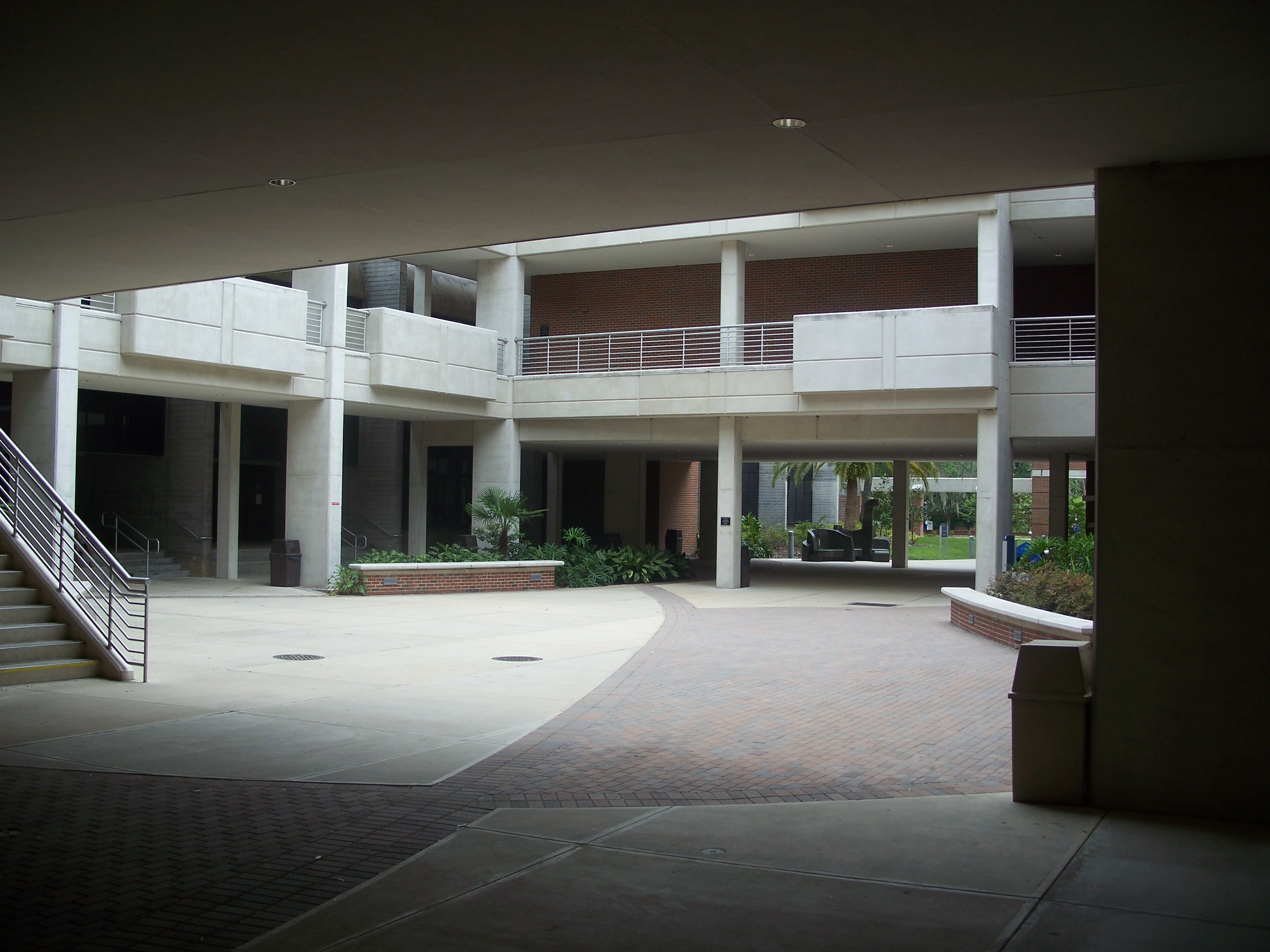
Plaza within Holland Law Center

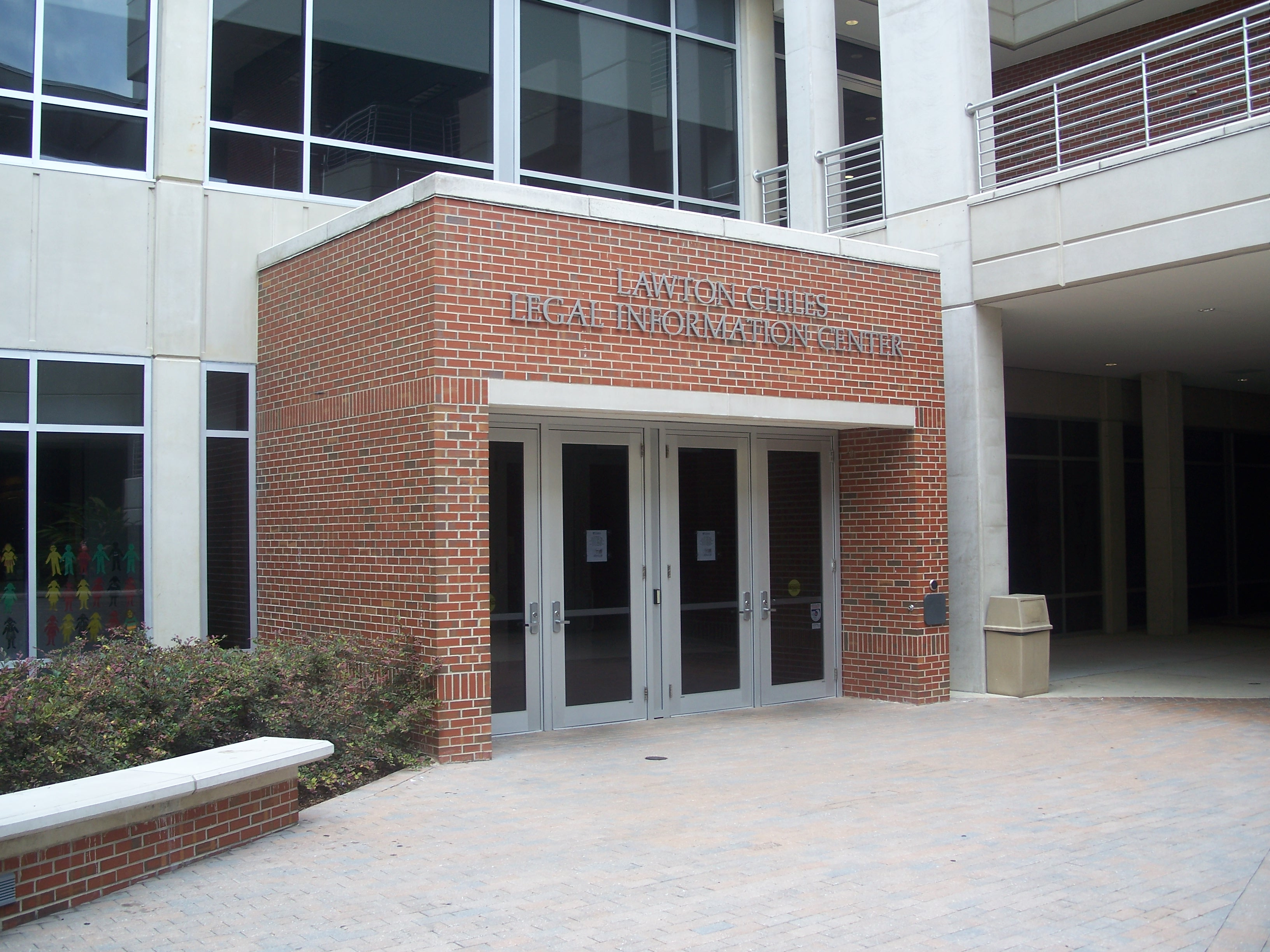
Chiles Law Library

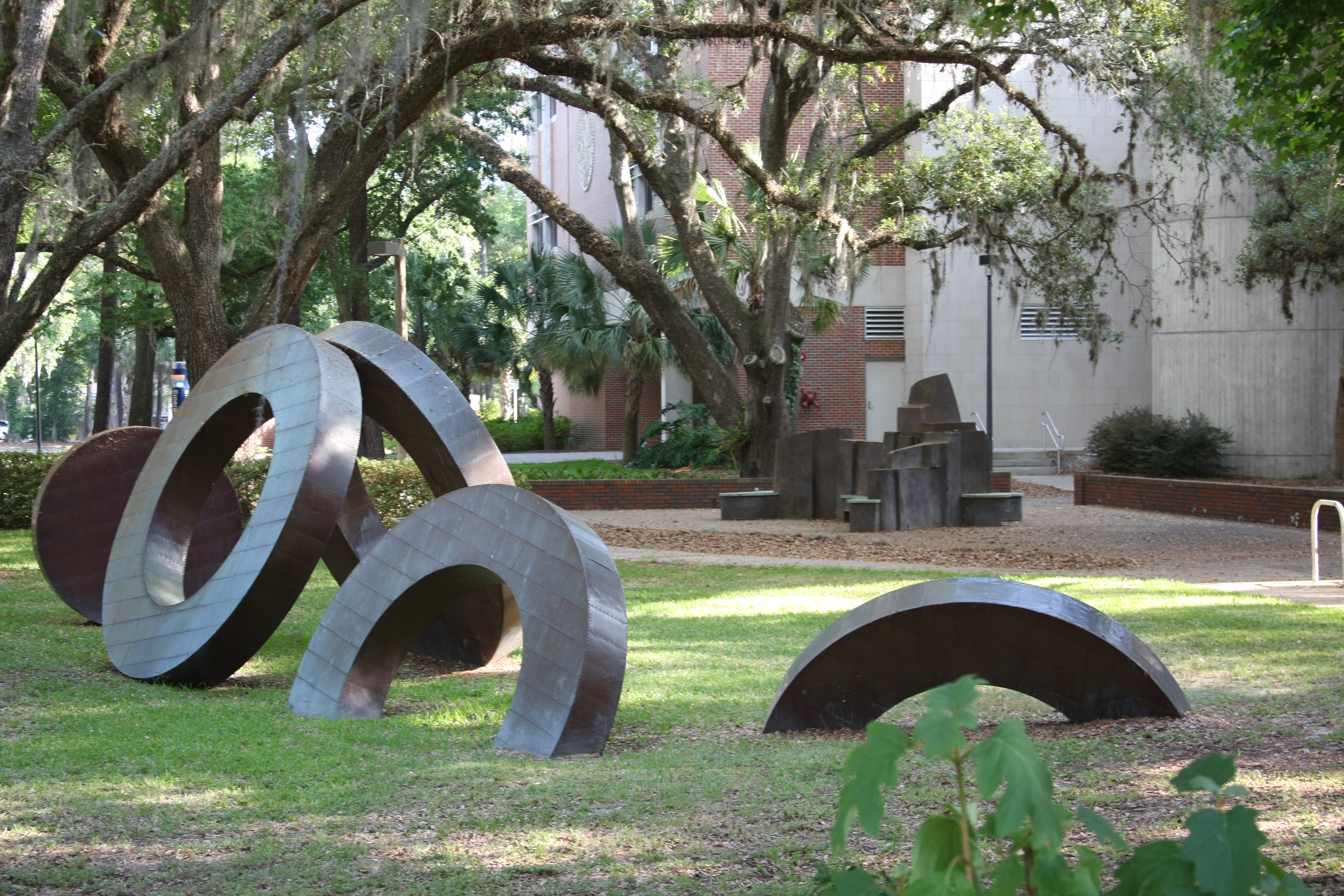
"Cheerios" sculpture

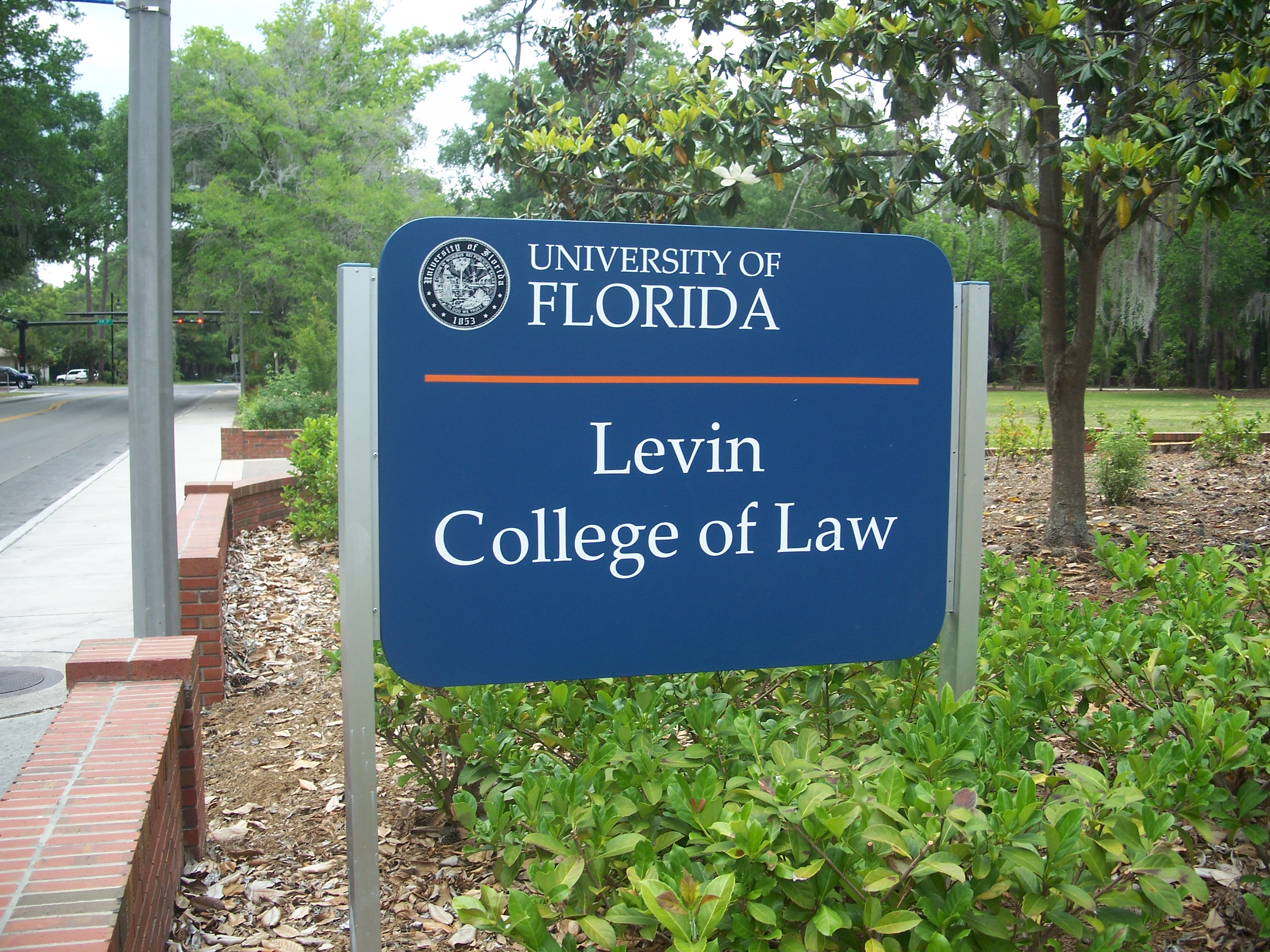
College of Law sign

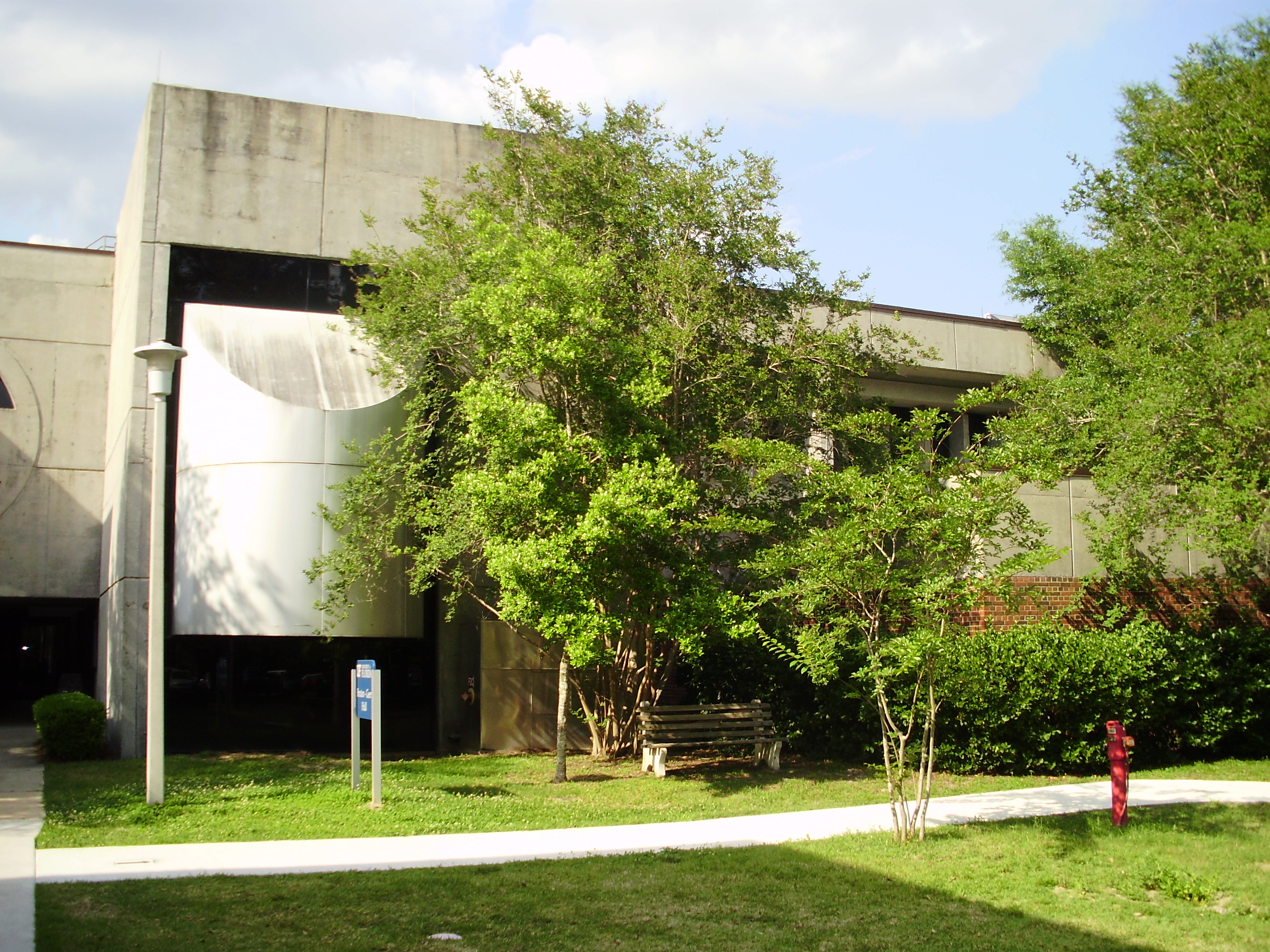
Bruton-Geer Hall

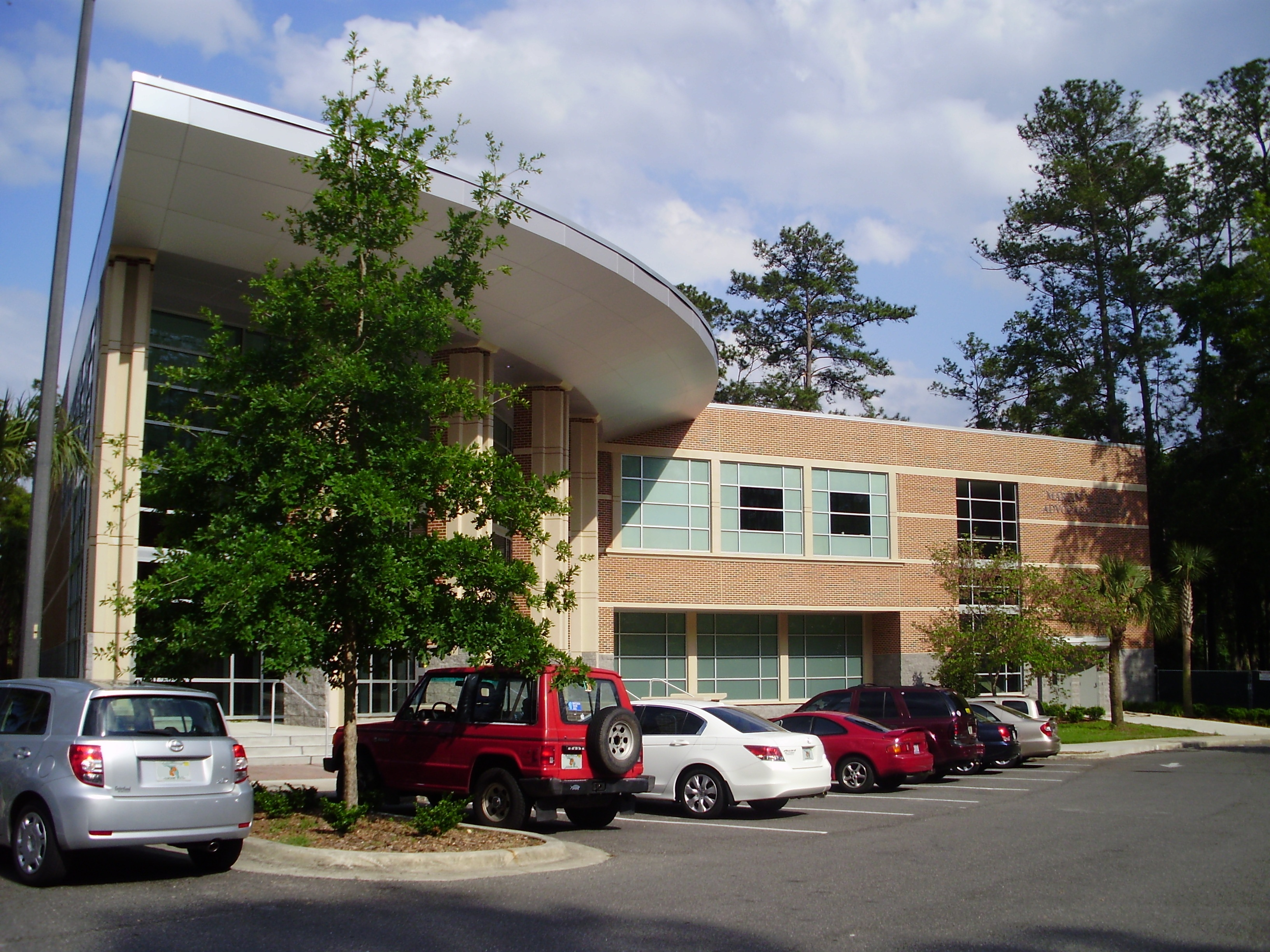
Levin Law Advocacy Center
