= Robert Jerry =

American college dean (born 1953)

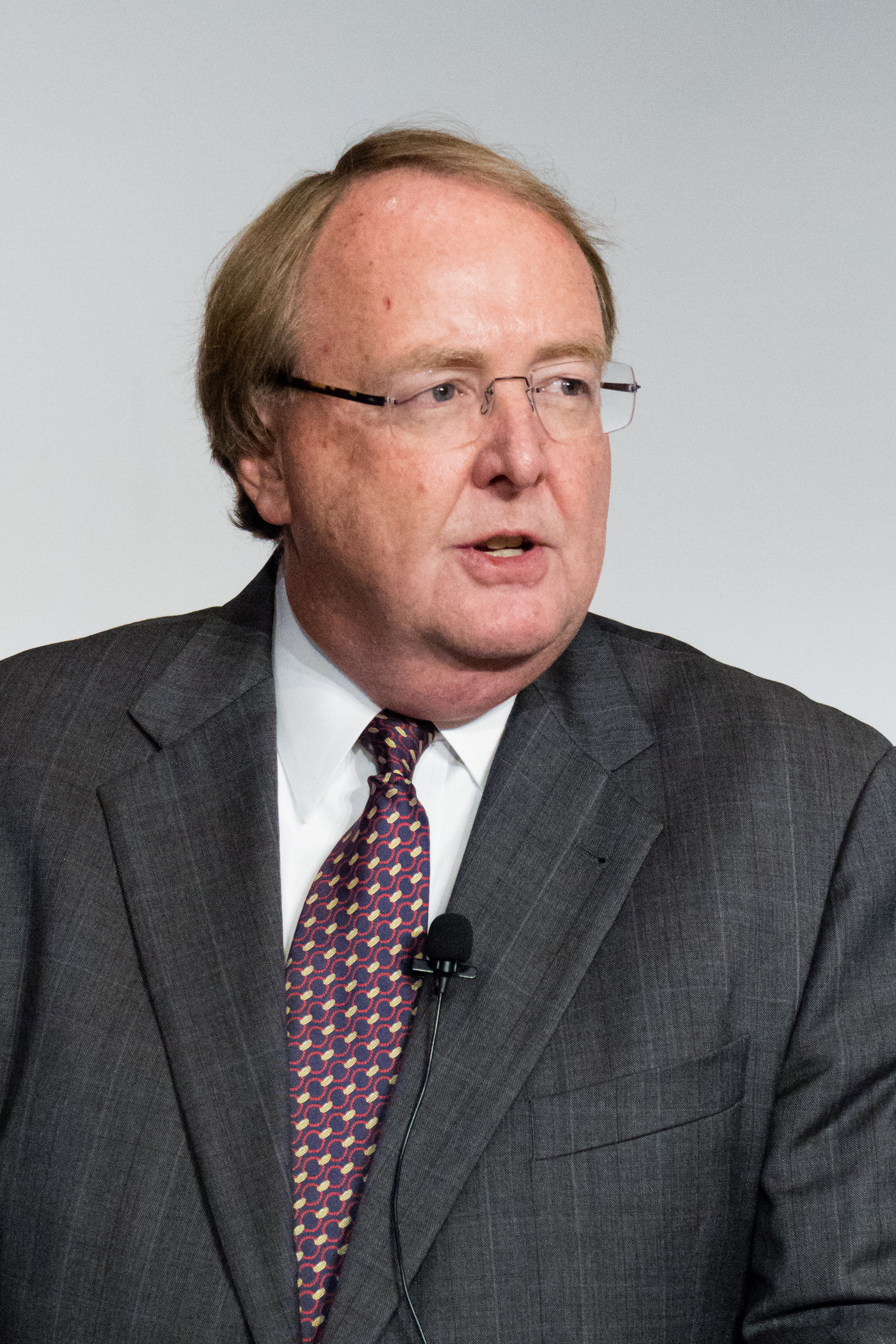
- Jerry in 2016
- Born: 1953 (age 72–73)
- Education: Indiana State University (BS); University of Michigan (JD)
- Known for: Dean of University of Florida Levin College of Law

Robert "Bob" H. Jerry, II (born 1953) is the former dean of the University of Florida's Levin College of Law, serving from 2003 to 2014. He succeeded Jon Mills, who stepped down and returned to the University of Florida's law faculty. Jerry became Dean of the College in July 2003.

== Career ==
Jerry earned a B.S., magna cum laude, from Indiana State University in 1974. He then graduated cum laude from the University of Michigan Law School, where he was a member of the Michigan Law Review. In 1977. Jerry served as a law clerk for Judge George E. MacKinnon of the U.S. Court of Appeals for the District of Columbia Circuit from 1977 to 1978.

Before Jerry became the dean of the Levin College of Law in 2003, he held the Floyd R. Gibson Missouri Endowed Professorship at the University of Missouri School of Law in Columbia, Missouri (1998–2003). From 1994 to 1998, he was the Herbert Herff Chair of Excellence at the Cecil C. Humphreys School of Law at the University of Memphis. He also served as the dean of the University of Kansas School of Law from 1989 to 1994, where he was also a member of the faculty from 1981 to 1994. He practiced law with the firm of Barnes, Hickam, Pantzer & Boyd in Indianapolis, Indiana from 1978 to 1981.

In August 2013, Jerry announced he would be stepping down as Dean at the end of the '13-'14 school year in (May 2014). He remained on the faculty.

Jerry teaches a course on insurance law and is the author of Understanding Insurance Law, published by LexisNexis and the "Defining Insurance" chapter of the New Appleman on Insurance Law Library Edition treatise..
