= List of presidential trips made by Bill Clinton (2000–01) =

This is a list of presidential trips made by Bill Clinton during 2000–2001, the eighth and final year of his presidency as the 42nd president of the United States. International trips are highlighted in blue.

This list excludes trips made within Washington, D.C., the U.S. federal capital in which the White House, the official residence and principal workplace of the president, is located. It also excludes the capital's immediate surroundings in Maryland and Virginia, such as Andrews Air Force Base in Maryland, where the president typically boards Air Force One for all trips outside the area. Also excluded are trips to Camp David, the country residence of the president, and to the Clinton family's home in Chappaqua, New York.

== January 2000 ==
State or country	Areas visited	Dates	Details
West Virginia	Shepherdstown	January 3, 4, 6, 7, 9	Repeatedly traveled between Washington, D.C., and the Shepherdstown Conference, a series of peace talks between Israeli prime minister Ehud Barak and Syrian foreign minister Farouk al-Shara at Shepherdstown's Clarion Hotel and at the U.S. Fish and Wildlife Service's National Conservation Training Center.
Maryland	Annapolis	January 10	Attended the funeral of Admiral Elmo Zumwalt at the Naval Academy Chapel
Arizona	Coconino County	January 10–11	Toured Grand Canyon National Park. Announced the designations of Agua Fria, California Coastal, and Grand Canyon–Parashant as National Monuments, and the expansion of Pinnacles National Monument.
Texas	Houston	January 11	Attended a campaign reception for Representative Sheila Jackson Lee and a dinner for the Texas Legislative Victory Fund at a private residence.
New York	New York	January 13	Spoke at Boricua College. Addressed the Wall Street Project Conference at the Sheraton Towers Hotel and at a reception at the New York Stock Exchange, where he rang the closing bell. Interviewed by Ron Insana of CNBC at the New York Stock Exchange. Attended a DNC reception at a private residence.
Massachusetts	Boston	January 18	Proposed the National Firearms Enforcement Initiative at the Orchard Gardens Community Center. Interviewed by the Christian Science Monitor at the Park Plaza Hotel. Attended a DNC reception at a private residence.
California	Pasadena, Los Angeles	January 21–22	Spoke at the Beckman Auditorium at the California Institute of Technology. Attended a DNC reception at the Regency Club.
Illinois	Quincy	January 28	Spoke at Washington Park. Visited the Granite Bank Gallery.
Switzerland	Davos	January 29	Addressed the World Economic Forum.

== February ==
State or country	Areas visited	Dates	Details
Virginia	Hot Springs	February 7	Attended the House Democratic Issues Conference.
Texas	McAllen, Dallas	February 9	Campaigned for Ruben Hinojosa in McAllen. Attended a DNC reception at a private residence in Dallas.
Pennsylvania	Philadelphia	February 24	Spoke to the Granoff Forum at the University of Pennsylvania's Irvine Auditorium.
New York	New York	February 24	Attended DNC dinners at Daniel and the Four Seasons Restaurant.
Florida	West Palm Beach, Miami	February 29	Attended a DNC luncheon at a private residence. Campaigned for Elaine Bloom in Miami.

== March ==
State or country	Areas visited	Dates	Details
California	Palo Alto, San Jose, San Francisco, Los Angeles, Beverly Hills	March 3–5	Addressed an Aspen Institute summit at Novell offices in San Jose. Attended DNC receptions at the InterContinental Mark Hopkins San Francisco and the Café des Artistes in Los Angeles, and a DSCC dinner at a private residence.
Alabama	Selma	March 5	Visited the Edmund Pettus Bridge and toured the National Voting Rights Museum, marking the approximate 35th anniversary of Bloody Sunday during the Selma to Montgomery marches.
Ohio	Cleveland	March 13	Attended a DCCC luncheon at the Playhouse Square Center. Spoke at the Louis Stokes Wing of the Cleveland Public Library.
Illinois	Chicago, Lincolnwood	March 13	Attended DNC dinners at Stefani's Restaurant and a private residence in Lincolnwood.
Maryland	Baltimore	March 15	Attended a DNC dinner at the Harbor Court Hotel.
Italy	Aviano Air Base	March 18	Stopped en route to India.
India	New Delhi, Agra, Jaipur, Hyderabad, Mumbai	March 19–25	Met with President Kocheril Raman Narayanan. Signed Joint Statement on Energy and the Environment. Addressed the Indian Parliament.
Bangladesh	Dhaka	March 20	Met with President Shahabuddin Ahmed and Prime Minister Sheikh Hasina.
Pakistan	Islamabad	March 25	Met with President Muhammad Rafiq Tarar and General Pervez Musharraf. Delivered radio address.
Oman	Muscat	March 25	Met with Sultan Qaboos bin Said.
Switzerland	Geneva	March 25	Met with Syrian President Hafez al-Assad.
South Carolina	Columbia	March 29	Campaigned for Representative Jim Clyburn at Allen University's John Hurst Adams Gymnatorium.
New York	New York	March 30	Attended DNC receptions at private residences and at the Waldorf Astoria New York. Spoke at the Selfhelp Austin Street Senior Center in Queens.

== April ==
State or country	Areas visited	Dates	Details
Nevada	Las Vegas	April 2	Attended DNC and Nevada Democratic Party receptions at private residences.
California	San Jose, Palo Alto	April 2–3	Attended a DCCC reception at a private residence. Spoke at the Democratic Leadership Council Conference at the Tech Museum of Innovation.
Louisiana	New Orleans, Alexandria	April 8	Spoke at a DNC reception at a private residence. Attended the annual musical performance of Messiah at The Pentecostals of Alexandria church.
Arkansas	Fayetteville	April 9	Visited the University of Arkansas.
Maryland	Annapolis	April 11	Attended a ceremony at the Maryland State House where Governor Parris Glendening signed the Responsible Gun Safety Act into law.
Colorado	Denver	April 12	Spoke at a gun safety rally at the Colorado Convention Center. Participated in an MSNBC–broadcast town hall meeting moderated by Tom Brokaw at the University of Denver.
Georgia	Atlanta	April 14	Took questions from the Education Writers Association at the Sheraton Colony Square Hotel. Campaigned for Representative Cynthia McKinney at a private residence, and for Representative John Lewis at the Atlanta Airport Hilton and Towers.
California	Tulare County, Beverly Hills, East Palo Alto	April 14–17	Visited the Trail of 100 Giants at Sequoia National Forest, where he proclaimed the creation of Giant Sequoia National Monument. Campaigned for Vice President Al Gore's presidential campaign at the Greystone Mansion in Beverly Hills. Took questions on Internet technology and the digital divide at Plugged In Enterprises, a nonprofit in East Palo Alto, and at Costano Elementary School.
New Mexico	Shiprock, Albuquerque	April 17	Discussed expanding Internet access to the Navajo Nation at the Boys and Girls Club of Shiprock. Took questions at Diné College.
Illinois	Chicago	April 18	Spoke at the COMDEX spring trade show at the Arie Crown Theater.
Oklahoma	Oklahoma City	April 19	Dedicated the Oklahoma City National Memorial on the fifth anniversary of the Murrah Building bombing.
New York	New York	April 24	Campaigned for Representative Michael Forbes at a private residence. Attended a DNC dinner at the Sheraton Towers Hotel.
North Carolina	Whiteville	April 26	Spoke at the local train depot. Viewed a product demonstration at a local business, Remote Data Systems.
Arkansas	Little Rock	April 26–27	Attended a memorial service for Daisy Bates at the Robinson Center. Spoke at a groundbreaking ceremony for a new building for the William H. Bowen School of Law at the University of Arkansas at Little Rock.
Michigan	Ypsilanti, Detroit	April 30	Gave the commencement address at Eastern Michigan University, in the Convention Center. Addressed an NAACP Fight for Freedom Fund dinner at Cobo Hall.

== May ==
State or country	Areas visited	Dates	Details
Kentucky	Owensboro	May 3	Spoke at Audubon Elementary School.
Iowa	Davenport	May 3	Spoke at Central High School.
Minnesota	St. Paul	May 3–4	Spoke at City Academy High School, the nation's first charter school, where he was also interviewed by Tracy Smith of Channel One News.
Ohio	Columbus	May 4	Participated in a roundtable discussion on education policy at Eastgate Elementary School.
Pennsylvania	Farmington	May 5	Addressed the Senate Democratic Issues Caucus at the Nemacolin Woodlands Resort.
Virginia	Lancaster	May 5	
Arkansas	Little Rock	May 6	Spoke at a fundraiser for his wife, Senate candidate Hillary Rodham Clinton, at the Statehouse Convention Center.
New York	New York	May 8	Attended the funeral of John Cardinal O'Connor at St. Patrick's Cathedral.
Ohio	Akron	May 12	Participated in a roundtable discussion on the pending United States–China Relations Act of 2000 at an Ohio Army National Guard facility.
Minnesota	Shakopee	May 12	Visited the farm of Terry and Kitty Hauer.
New York	Albany	May 16	Attended the New York State Democratic Party convention at the Crowne Plaza hotel, where he campaigned for Hillary Rodham Clinton.
Connecticut	New London, Greenwich	May 17	Gave the commencement address at the United States Coast Guard Academy. Attended a DNC dinner at a private residence in Greenwich.
Pennsylvania	Philadelphia	May 19	Attended a DCCC luncheon at Philadelphia City Hall. Spoke at Mayer Sulzberger Middle School. Campaigned for Representative Joe Hoeffel at the Wyndham Franklin Plaza Hotel.
Illinois	Chicago	May 19	Attended a DSCC dinner at a private residence. Visited the Field Museum of Natural History.
New York	Hyde Park	May 21	Addressed the Democratic Leadership Council summit at the Franklin D. Roosevelt Presidential Library and Museum.
Rhode Island	Providence	May 25	Attended the funeral of Clinton's former ambassador to Finland Derek Shearer's son Casey, a Brown University student who had died suddenly a few days before graduation, at Sayles Memorial Hall.
Maryland	Worcester County	May 26	Signed Executive Order 13158, strengthening preservation of Marine Protected Areas, and discussed new protections for the Northwestern Hawaiian Islands Coral Reef Ecosystem Reserve at Assateague Island National Seashore's North Ocean Beach.
Portugal	Lisbon	May 30 – June 1	Attended the U.S.-EU Summit Meeting. Met with Israeli Prime Minister Ehud Barak.

== June ==
State or country	Areas visited	Dates	Details
Germany	Berlin, Aachen	June 1–3	Met with President Johannes Rau and Chancellor Schröder; received Charlemagne Prize, and attended a Third Way Conference.
Russia	Moscow	June 3–5	Summit meeting with President Vladimir Putin. Addressed the Duma.
Ukraine	Kyiv	June 5	Met with President Leonid Kuchma.
Japan	Tokyo	June 8	Attended the funeral of former Prime Minister Keizō Obuchi.
Minnesota	Northfield, Minneapolis	June 10	Gave the commencement address at Carleton College. Attended a DNC luncheon at the offices of Key Investment in Minneapolis and a New Leadership Network reception at the Fine Line Music Cafe.
New York	New York	June 16	Appeared on the Today show with Matt Lauer and Billy Joel to endorse the VH1 Save The Music Foundation, in a live broadcast from Joseph C. Lanzetta School in East Harlem. Discussed new school construction at Abigail Adams Elementary School in Jamaica, Queens. Campaigned for Representative Edolphus Towns at a private apartment in Trump Tower.
Texas	Houston, Austin	June 19	Addressed a Southwest Voter Registration Education Project reception and a DSCC luncheon at the Four Seasons Hotel Houston. Attended a DSCC dinner at a private residence in Austin.
Arizona	Phoenix	June 22	Attended a Federal Victory Fund reception and a DNC luncheon at the Ritz-Carlton.
California	San Diego, Chula Vista, Los Angeles	June 22–24	Campaigned for Susan Davis at the El Cortez Hotel. Addressed a DNC dinner at Mr. A's Restaurant. Visited athletes preparing for the 2000 Summer Olympics at the United States Olympic Training Center. Spoke at a California Democratic Party reception at the Century Plaza Hotel. Attended a Saxophone Club reception at the Garden of Eden nightclub. Addressed a DNC dinner, a Democratic National Convention 2000 Host Committee breakfast, and campaigned for Senator Dianne Feinstein at private residences in Los Angeles. Addressed the Association of State Democratic Chairs at the Century Plaza Hotel.
Pennsylvania	Philadelphia	June 30	Addressed the American Federation of State, County and Municipal Employees at the Pennsylvania Convention Center. Signed the Electronic Signatures in Global and National Commerce Act at Congress Hall. Visited Independence Hall.
New Jersey	Englewood	June 30	Spoke at a DSCC luncheon at a private residence.

== July ==
State or country	Areas visited	Dates	Details
New York	New York	July 4, 5	Attended Operation Sail on Independence Day, where he boarded the USS Hué City and USS John F. Kennedy in New York Harbor. Spoke in support of the Optional Protocols on Children's Rights at United Nations Headquarters. Addressed a Military Salute Week dinner at the Intrepid Sea, Air & Space Museum.
Missouri	Columbia	July 6	Advocated for the Patients' Bill of Rights at the University of Missouri's Jesse Auditorium.
Pennsylvania	State College, Philadelphia	July 10	Addressed the National Governors Association meeting at the Penn Stater Hotel in State College. Campaigned for Representative Ron Klink for Senate at The Warwick.
Maryland	Baltimore	July 13	Addressed the NAACP National Convention at the Baltimore Convention Center.
Japan	Nago	July 21–23	Attended the 26th G8 summit.
Arkansas	Fayetteville	July 25	Attended a memorial service for Diane Blair at the Walton Arts Center.
Rhode Island	Providence, Barrington	July 28	Spoke at Rhode Island T. F. Green International Airport. Campaigned for Representative Patrick J. Kennedy at a private residence in Barrington.
Massachusetts	Boston, Cambridge	July 28	Attended a DCCC reception and dinner at private residences.
New York	New York	July 29	Campaigned for Hillary Rodham Clinton at the Waldorf Astoria New York.
Illinois	Chicago	July 30	Attended a DNC luncheon at a local restaurant, 437 Rush. Addressed the Association of Trial Lawyers of America convention at the Hyatt Regency Chicago.
Florida	Tampa, Delray Beach	July 31	Spoke about the United States–China Relations Act at the Airport Hilton in Tampa. Visited the David Barksdale Senior Center. Attended a DSCC luncheon at the Hyatt Regency Westshore in Tampa. Visited the Tampa Bay Buccaneers training facility. Addressed a DSCC reception at the Colony Hotel & Cabaña Club, followed by dinner at a private residence.

== August ==
State or country	Areas visited	Dates	Details
Massachusetts	Martha's Vineyard, Nantucket, Hyannis Port	August 4–7	Spoke at receptions for Hillary Rodham Clinton at private residences in Nantucket and Martha's Vineyard. Spoke at a reception for Kathleen Kennedy Townsend's campaign for governor of Maryland at a private residence in Hyannis Port. Signed the Oceans Act of 2000 at West Chop Light.
Idaho	Burgdorf	August 8	Met with firefighters in Payette National Forest who were fighting a wildfire.
Virginia	Charlottesville	August 8	Attended a DNC dinner at a private residence.
Illinois	Chicago, South Barrington	August 10	Participated in a roundtable discussion at DePaul University's Stuart Center. Visited the Ministers' Leadership Conference at the Willow Creek Community Church in South Barrington.
New York	New York	August 10	Campaigned for Hillary Rodham Clinton at a private residence.
California	Los Angeles, Beverly Hills	August 11–15	Campaigned for Representative Xavier Becerra at the Westin Century Plaza Hotel. Was the subject of a "Hollywood tribute" at a private residence. Attended a DNC brunch at the Casa Del Mar. Spoke at a Jewish community event at Sony Pictures Studios. Raised funds for his presidential library at Barbra Streisand's house. Greeted the Arkansas delegation to the 2000 Democratic National Convention at Los Angeles Union Station. Addressed a National Democratic Institute luncheon at the Dorothy Chandler Pavilion. Addressed an American Federation of Teachers and National Education Association at The Beverly Hilton. Spoke at the Democratic National Convention at the Staples Center. Attended a DNC dinner and "Tribute to the President" reception at Paramount Studios.
Michigan	Monroe	August 15	Campaigned for Al Gore in Loranger Square.
New York	Saranac Lake, Lake Placid	August 18–20	Spoke to local Democratic Party organizations at the Saranac Lake Civic Center.
Michigan	Bingham Farms, Bloomfield Hills	August 22	Campaigned for Representative Debbie Stabenow for Senate at private residences in both communities.
New Jersey	Monmouth Junction, Princeton, Cherry Hill	August 23	Visited Crossroads Middle School in Monmouth Junction. Campaigned for Rush Holt Jr. at a private residence in Princeton, and for Susan Bass Levin for Congress at Garden State Park Racetrack.
Nigeria	Abuja, Ushafa	August 26–28	Met with President Olusegun Obasanjo. Addressed the National Assembly.
Tanzania	Arusha	August 28–29	Met with former South African president Nelson Mandela to promote a peace agreement for Burundi. Met with President Benjamin Mkapa.
Egypt	Cairo	August 29	Briefed President Hosni Mubarak on the Middle East Peace Process.
Colombia	Cartagena	August 30	Met with President Andrés Pastrana Arango.

== September ==
State or country	Areas visited	Dates	Details
New York	Syracuse, Cazenovia	September 1–2	Campaigned for Hillary Rodham Clinton at private residences in both communities. Visited the New York State Fair.
New York	New York, Scarsdale	September 5–11	Attended the Millennium Summit and the opening of the 55th United Nations General Assembly at United Nations Headquarters. Stayed at the Waldorf Astoria and hosted world leaders there. Campaigned for Hillary Rodham Clinton at a private residence. Visited the Jewish Community Center of Mid-Westchester in Scarsdale.
Connecticut	Danbury	September 11	Campaigned for Representative James H. Maloney at Western Connecticut State University.
New York	New York	September 11	Campaigned for Representative Anthony Weiner and Hillary Rodham Clinton at private residences. Spoke at the Partners in History dinner at The Pierre.
Pennsylvania	Philadelphia	September 17	Raised funds for Hillary Rodham Clinton at the City Tavern. Attended the groundbreaking ceremony for the National Constitution Center on Constitution Day and Citizenship Day.
Michigan	Flint, Detroit, Livonia	September 21	Toured accessible technology demonstrations at the Disability Network in Flint. Spoke at Mott Community College. Addressed the State Bar of Michigan at the Atheneum Suites Hotel in Detroit. Campaigned for John Dingell at Laurel Manor in Lansing.
California	Palo Alto, San Jose, Brentwood, Beverly Hills, Pacific Palisades, Bel Air, Hidden Hills	September 23–24	Attended a DNC luncheon at a private residence in Palo Alto. Campaigned for Mike Honda for Congress at a private residence in San Jose. Addressed a DCCC dinner at a private residence in Brentwood. Campaigned for Representative Lois Capps at a private residence in Brentwood. Addressed the California League of Conservation Voters at a private residence in Bel Air. Attended a DNC dinner at a private residence in Hidden Hills.
New Mexico	Santa Fe	September 25	Advocated for the reauthorization of the Violence Against Women Act at the Genoveva Chavez Community Center. Attended a campaign event for multiple candidates at La Fonda on the Plaza.
Texas	Dallas, Houston	September 27	Addressed the Gay and Lesbian Leadership Council at a private residence in Dallas. Campaigned for Representative Max Sandlin at a private residence in Houston. Received a "Texas Tribute" at the Hyatt Regency Houston Downtown.

== October ==
State or country	Areas visited	Dates	Details
Florida	Miami, Coral Gables, Jacksonville	October 3–4	Raised funds for Hillary Rodham Clinton at a private residence in Miami. Canceled an intended visit to a DCCC dinner in Jupiter due to adverse weather. Stayed at the Miami Biltmore Hotel. Campaigned for Representative Corrine Brown and addressed the Uncommon Women on Common Ground Conference at the Prime F. Osborn III Convention Center.
New Jersey	Princeton	October 5	Addressed the Conference on the Progressive Tradition at Princeton University's Richardson Auditorium.
New York	New York	October 5	Addressed a National Leadership PAC reception at the Supper Club. Raised funds for Tom Carper for Senate at a private residence.
Pennsylvania	Pittsburgh, Philadelphia	October 11	Campaigned for Ron Klink at the David L. Lawrence Convention Center. Spoke to AmeriCorps volunteers at Memorial Hall. Campaigned for multiple candidates at the Wyndham Franklin Plaza Hotel in Philadelphia.
Colorado	Denver	October 14	Spoke about the Job Access Initiative at Mi Casa Resource Center. Campaigned for local state senate candidates at the Oxford Hotel.
Washington	Seattle	October 14	Campaigned for Maria Cantwell for Senate, Governor Gary Locke, and Representative Jay Inslee at the Westin Seattle.
Egypt	Sharm el-Sheikh	October 16–17	Attended the Israeli-Palestinian Summit Meeting.
Virginia	Norfolk, Gainesville	October 18	Attended a memorial service for victims of the USS Cole bombing at Naval Station Norfolk. Opened the 2000 Presidents Cup at the Robert Trent Jones Golf Club.
Connecticut	East Norwalk	October 19	Raised funds for Hillary Rodham Clinton at a private residence.
Missouri	Jefferson City	October 20	Attended a memorial service for Governor Mel Carnahan at the Missouri State Capitol.
Massachusetts	Lowell, Boston	October 20	Campaigned for Representative Marty Meehan at the DoubleTree Riverfront Hotel in Lowell. Attended a DSCC dinner at a private residence in Boston.
Indiana	Indianapolis	October 20–21	Raised funds for Hillary Rodham Clinton at a private residence. Campaigned for Representative Julia Carsona at the Indiana State Fairgrounds.
New York	Johnson City, Alexandria Bay, Hempstead, New York	October 22	Campaigned for Hillary Rodham Clinton at the Fountains Pavilion in Johnson City, the Bonnie Castle Resort in Alexandria Bay, Hofstra University's Lowenfeld Hall, and the Hudson Theatre.
New York	Kingston, New York, New Rochelle	October 23	Campaigned for Representative Maurice Hinchey at the Hillside Manor Restaurant in Kingston, and for Hillary Rodham Clinton at the IBEW Electrical Industry Auditorium in Flushing, Queens. Attended a Westchester County Democratic Party dinner at the VIP Country Club in New Rochelle.
New York	New York	October 25	Campaigned for Representative Gregory Meeks at the Embassy Suites Battery Park. Attended a New York Democratic Assembly Campaign Committee reception at the Four Seasons Hotel New York. Celebrated Hillary Rodham Clinton's birthday at the Roseland Ballroom.
Kentucky	Louisville	October 31	Campaigned for Eleanor Jordan for Congress at duPont Manual High School.
New York	New York	October 31	Spoke at Kelly Temple Church of God in Christ in Harlem. Campaigned for Hillary Rodham Clinton at the Fitzpatrick Hotel.

== November ==
State or country	Areas visited	Dates	Details
California	Los Angeles, Beverly Hills, Oakland, San Francisco, San Jose	November 2–3	Attended a California Democratic Party reception at the Regency Club. Spoke at a campaign rally at Baldwin Hills Crenshaw Plaza. Campaigned for Gerrie Schipske for Congress at the Regency Club, for Cal Dooley at a private residence in Beverly Hills, and for Jane Harman at Global Crossing headquarters in Beverly Hills. Addressed Gore campaign rallies at Oakland City Center, the Moscone Center, and San Jose Civic Center.
New York	New York	November 4	Attended a Bronx County Democratic Committee rally at the Marina Del Ray restaurant. Addressed Gore campaign rallies at the Adam Clayton Powell Jr. State Office Building and LIU Brooklyn.
Arkansas	Little Rock, Pine Bluff	November 4–5	Addressed an Arkansas Civic Leaders luncheon at the Statehouse Convention Center. Campaigned for Mike Ross for Congress at the Pine Bluff Convention Center.
New York	New York	November 7	Attended an Election Night reception at the Grand Hyatt New York.
Hawaii	Kona	November 13	Stopover on the way to Brunei.
Brunei	Bandar Seri Begawan	November 14–16	Attended the APEC Summit Meeting.
Vietnam	Hanoi, Tien Chau, Ho Chi Minh City	November 16–19	Met with General Secretary of the Communist Party of Vietnam Lê Kh? Phiêu. Also met with President Tran Duc Luong. Delivered several public addresses.
Alaska	Anchorage	November 19	Stopover at Elmendorf Air Force Base on the way back from Vietnam.
New York	New York	November 30	Attended the G&P Foundation Angel Ball, a breast cancer research benefit event, at the New York Marriott Marquis.

== December ==
State or country	Areas visited	Dates	Details
Nebraska	Kearney, Omaha	December 8	Spoke at the University of Nebraska at Kearney's Cushing Health and Sports Center, at Offutt Air Force Base, and at a private residence in Omaha. This was Clinton's only presidential visit to Nebraska, and with it he became the third president to visit all 50 states while in office.
Ireland	Dublin, Dundalk	December 12	Met with Taoiseach Bertie Ahern. Delivered several public addresses.
United Kingdom	Belfast, London, Coventry	December 12–14	Met with Prime Minister Tony Blair and Northern Irish political leaders in Belfast. Met with Queen Elizabeth II and delivered a speech at the University of Warwick.
New York	New York	December 18	

== January 2001 ==
State or country	Areas visited	Dates	Details
New York	Syracuse	January 4	Attended the funeral of Terry McAuliffe's father Jack at the Cathedral of the Immaculate Conception.
New York	New York	January 7	Attended a tribute to newly inaugurated Senator Hillary Rodham Clinton at Madison Square Garden. Addressed an Israel Policy Forum dinner at the Waldorf Astoria.
Michigan	East Lansing	January 9	Spoke at Michigan State University's Breslin Student Events Center.
Illinois	Chicago	January 9	Visited James Ward Elementary School.
New Hampshire	Dover, Manchester	January 11	Spoke at Dover High School.
Massachusetts	Boston	January 11	Spoke at Northeastern University's Matthews Arena.
Arkansas	Little Rock	January 17	Addressed a joint session of the Arkansas General Assembly at the State Capitol. Spoke at Adams Field Airport.
