= Florida's 10th Senate district =

American legislative district

Florida's 10th State Senate district
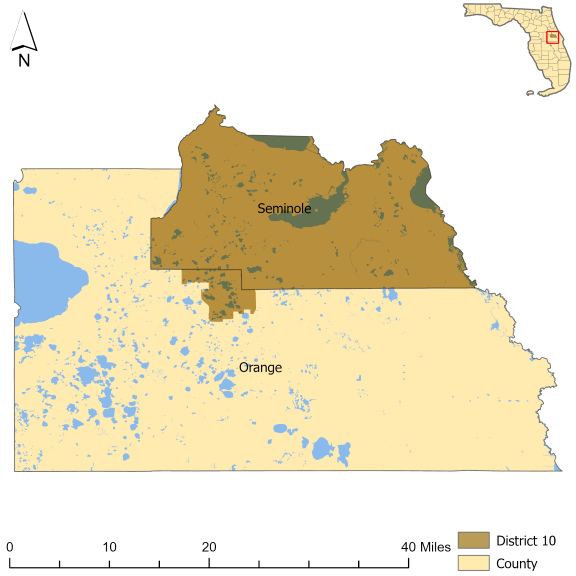
- Interactive map of district boundary since January 3, 2023
Senator
John Lowndes; D–Maitland
- Demographics: 57% White; 11% Black; 22% Hispanic; 5% Asian; 1% Other; 4% Multiracial
- Population (2023): 540,931

Florida's 10th Senate district elects one member of the Florida Senate. The district consists of all of Seminole County and part of northern Orange County, in the U.S. state of Florida. The current senator is Democrat John Lowndes.

== List of senators ==
Full list of senators from the 10th district (1845–present).

Portrait	Name	Party	Years of service	Home city/state	Notes
	Daniel Bell	Democratic	1845		
	Theodore W. Brevard Jr.	Democratic	1865–1866	Tuskegee, Alabama	
	Alfred Brown Osgood	Republican	1875–1877	Madison, Florida	
	W. Turner Davis	Democratic	1943–1961	Madison, Florida	
	John J. Fisher	Republican	1965–1969		
	Dan Scarbrough	Democratic	1969–1971		
	Bill Gillespie	Democratic	1973–1974	Daytona Beach, Florida	Consisted of part of Volusia County
	Edgar M. Dunn Jr.	Democratic	1975–1986		Consisted of part of Volusia County
	Tom Brown	Democratic	1986–1991	Daytona Beach, Florida	
	Locke Burt	Republican	1991–1992		Consisted of Hernando County
	Ginny Brown-Waite	Republican	1992–2002	Albany, New York	Consisted of Hernando County
	Tom Lee	Republican	2002–2006	San Antonio, Texas	Redistricted from the 23rd district; Consisted of parts of Hillsborough and Pasco counties
	Ronda Storms	Republican	2006–2012	Des Moines, Iowa	Consisted of parts of Hillsborough and Pasco counties
	David Simmons	Republican	2012–2016	Nashville, Tennessee	Redistricted from the 22nd district; Consisted of all of Seminole County and the southwestern part of Volusia County
	Wilton Simpson	Republican	2016–2022	Lakeland, Florida	Redistricted from the 18th district; Consisted of all of Citrus and Hernando counties, as well as most of Pasco County
	Jason Brodeur	Republican	2022–2026	Daytona Beach, Florida	Redistricted from the 9th district; Consisted of all of Seminole County and part of northern Orange County
	John Lowndes	Democratic	2026–	Maitland, Florida	Consists of all of Seminole County and part of northern Orange County

== Elections ==
=== 2018 ===
2018 Florida's 10th senate district election
Party	Candidate	Votes	%
Republican	Wilton Simpson (incumbent)	147,601	65.0
Democratic	Michael Cottrell	79,349	35.0
Majority		68,252	30.1
Total votes		226,950	100.0

=== 2022 ===
2022 Florida's 10th senate district election
Party	Candidate	Votes	%
Republican	Jason Brodeur (incumbent)	114,022	54.45
Democratic	Joy Goff-Marcil	95,391	45.55
Total votes		209,413	100%
Republican hold			

=== 2026 ===
Incumbent senator Jason Brodeur was eligible for re-election in 2026. He was defeated by John Lowndes in the general election.

2026 Florida's 10th senate district election
Party	Candidate	Votes	%
Democratic	John Lowndes	125,116	55.95
Republican	Jason Brodeur (incumbent)	98,503	44.05
Total votes		223,619	100.00
Democratic gain from Republican			
