= Senator Osgood =

Senator Osgood may refer to:

- Alfred Brown Osgood (1843–1911), Florida State Senate
- Joseph B. F. Osgood (1823–1913), Massachusetts State Senate
- Rosalind Osgood (born 1965/66), Florida State Senate
- Samuel Osgood (1747–1813), Massachusetts State Senate
