= Colony Hotel =

Colony Hotel may refer to:

Canada

- Chestnut Residence, a University of Toronto building, the former "Colony Hotel"

United States

- Colony Hotel & Cabaña Club, Delray Beach, Florida, one of the Historic Hotels of America
- The Colony Hotel (Kennebunkport, Maine), one of the Historic Hotels of America
