= Elaine Bloom =

American politician (born 1937)

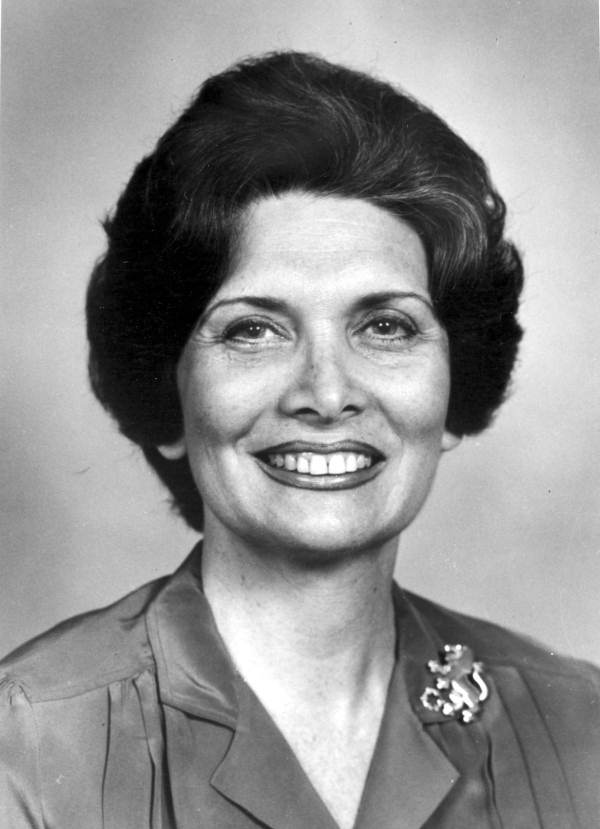

Speaker pro tempore of Florida House of Representatives
- In office 1992–1994
- Preceded by: Everett Kelly
- Succeeded by: Jack Ascherl

Member of the Florida House of Representatives from the 106th district
- In office 1992–1995

Member of the Florida House of Representatives from the 104th district
- In office 1986–1992

Member of the Florida House of Representatives from the 100th district
- In office 1974–1978

Personal details
- Born: September 16, 1937 (age 88) New York City, New York, U.S.
- Party: Democratic
- Spouse: Philip Bloom
- Education: Barnard College; Columbia University (B.A.)

Elaine Bloom (born September 16, 1937) is an American politician in the state of Florida. She is a member of the Democratic Party.

Bloom was born in New York City and graduated from Columbia University in 1957, where she majored in Government. Bloom is married with Judge Philip Bloom and have two children, Anne R. Bloom and David N. Bloom. The Bloom Family has lived in Miami-Dade County since 1962.

Bloom served in the Florida House of Representatives from 1974 to 1978 (for district 100), 1986 to 1992 (for district 104) and 1992 to 1995 (for district 106). She was speaker pro tempore of the House from 1992 to 1995.

In 2000, Bloom narrowly lost to E. Clay Shaw, Jr. the race for the Florida's 22nd congressional district by just over 500 votes.

In 2015, Bloom was named the president of Plaza Health Network.
