= Jason Brodeur =

American politician

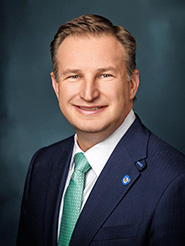
- Official portrait, 2024

President pro tempore of the Florida Senate
- In office November 20, 2024 – November 3, 2026
- Preceded by: Dennis Baxley

Member of the Florida Senate
- In office November 3, 2020 – November 3, 2026
- Preceded by: David Simmons
- Succeeded by: John Lowndes
- Constituency: 9th district (2020–2022); 10th district (2022–2026)

Member of the Florida House of Representatives from the 28th district
- In office November 6, 2012 – November 6, 2018
- Preceded by: Dorothy Hukill
- Succeeded by: David Smith

Member of the Florida House of Representatives from the 33rd district
- In office November 2, 2010 – November 6, 2012
- Preceded by: Sandy Adams
- Succeeded by: H. Marlene O'Toole

Personal details
- Born: June 7, 1975 (age 51) Daytona Beach, Florida, U.S.
- Party: Republican
- Education: University of Florida (BS, MBA); Dartmouth College (MPH)

Jason T. Brodeur is an American politician who served as a member of the Florida Senate representing the 10th district from 2022 to 2026, which consisted of Seminole and a small part of Orange County. Before the redistricting that took effect with the 2022 election, he represented the old 9th district from 2020 to 2022. A Republican, Brodeur previously served as a member of the Florida House of Representatives from 2010 to 2018. From 2010-2012, he represented the 33rd District. During his final six years in the Florida House, Brodeur represented the 28th District, which consists of eastern Seminole County. He also served as the president and CEO of the Seminole County Chamber, which advocates for pro-business practices in Seminole County and across the state of Florida.

== History ==
Brodeur attended the University of Florida, where he graduated with a degree in food and resource economics in 1997 and a Masters of Business Administration in 2003 before attending Dartmouth College, where he completed a Master of Public Health Degree. During college, Brodeur participated in several student organizations and was a member of Florida Blue Key. Following graduation, he worked for Procter & Gamble for several years before starting his own health care consulting company. Brodeur later served as the chairman of the Seminole County Republican Party. Before assuming office, Brodeur received gubernatorial appointments and served on the Medicaid Pharmaceutical and Therapeutics Committee, the 18th Circuit Judicial Nominating Commission, and the Citizen’s Safety Task Force.

== Florida House of Representatives ==
When incumbent State Representative Sandy Adams opted to run for Congress in 2010, Brodeur ran in the Republican primary to succeed her from the 33rd District, which included parts of Orange, Seminole, and Volusia Counties. In the primary, he defeated Alice Sterling and James DeCocq, winning 51% of the vote to Sterling's 37% and DeCocq's 11%. Brodeur advanced to the general election, where he faced Democratic nominee Leo Cruz and Libertarian Franklin Perez. Brodeur defeated Cruz and Perez, winning nearly 60% of the vote.

In 2012, the Florida House districts were redrawn, and Brodeur opted to run for re-election in the 28th District. He was challenged in the Republican primary by former Winter Springs Mayor John F. Bush. Bush ran against Brodeur due to his opposition to an amendment that Brodeur wrote "blocking Seminole [County] from cutting programs or closing schools, and forcing administrators making over $100,000 to take steep pay cuts." Ultimately, Brodeur comfortably defeated Bush, winning 61% of the vote. Brodeur again faced Perez in the general election, whom he defeated in a landslide with 66% of the vote.

Throughout his time in the House of Representatives, Brodeur lead numerous legislative committees such as the Government Operations Subcommittee, the Health and Human Services Committee and the Health Care Appropriations Subcommittee.

As a State Representative, Brodeur received numerous honors from several state advocacy groups. The Florida Chamber of Commerce named him a distinguished advocate and as a member of their honor roll. He has been named a “Friend of Enterprise” on two occasions by The Associated Builders and Contractors. In 2015, Brodeur was named the 2015 Florida Legislator of the Year by the Florida Coalition for Children. He was also named legislator of the year in 2012 by both Seminole County Bar Association and the Legal Aid Society.

== Florida Senate ==
When the incumbent, Senator David Simmons, was term-limited in 2020, Brodeur ran in the Republican Primary to succeed him from Senate District 9. Brodeur ran unopposed and was selected as the Republican nominee.

In his bid for the Senate, Brodeur was endorsed by key state leaders and organizations such as Governor Ron DeSantis, Attorney General Ashley Moody, and the Florida Chamber of Commerce.

In the general election, Brodeur faced Democrat Patricia Sigman and independent candidate Jestine Iannotti. Brodeur won the election with 50.3% of the vote, compared to Sigman’s 47.6% and Iannotti's 2.1%. The election drew controversy due to Iannotti, a "ghost candidate" with no formal campaign, allegedly participating with Republican support in order to split the Democratic vote. Seminole County Republican Party chairman Ben Paris, who had worked for Brodeur at the Seminole County Chamber of Commerce, was convicted in 2021 for involvement in an illegal donation to Iannotti's campaign.

In the 2021 legislative session, Brodeur introduced and co-introduced 41 total bills. Brodeur co-introduced SB 80, which established detailed case sheets for children in foster care. This bill was passed unanimously in both the House and the Senate. Brodeur also co-introduced SB 88 that provided farmers with protection from frivolous lawsuits. During the 2021 Session, Brodeur co-introduced SB 896, which limited the ability of local governments to approve solar projects, and reclassified pulling methane gas from a landfill as renewable. While Brodeur co-introduced the bill, the Tampa Bay Times reported that the state's energy and utilities industry was the primary force behind the bill. SB 896 passed both houses, and was signed into law.

Brodeur introduced SB 976 to expand the Florida Wildlife Corridor, which unanimously passed both chambers and was signed into law. This legislation seeks to preserve over 17 million acres of natural land and create a non-motorized trail connecting Naples to Orlando.

In 2023, Jason introduced SB 1550, known as the Prescription Drug Reform Act, which has been called “perhaps the most comprehensive PBM reform bill ever introduced.” It received unanimous support and was signed into law by Governor DeSantis. The bill seeks to lower prescription drug costs by regulating pharmacy benefit managers and requiring more transparency in pricing.

Brodeur introduced SB 280 to increase criminal penalties for and help prosecute Fentanyl dealers. This bill passed both chambers and was signed into law by the Governor.

In March 2023, Brodeur introduced a bill requiring bloggers who write about Florida government officials for pay to register with the Florida Office of Legislative Services or the Commission on Ethics.

== Personal life ==
Brodeur is married to Christy Daly Brodeur, and they live in Sanford, Florida.

Florida Senate
Preceded by Dennis Baxley	President pro tempore of the Florida Senate; 2024–present	Incumbent
