= Suzanne Kosmas =

American politician (born 1944)

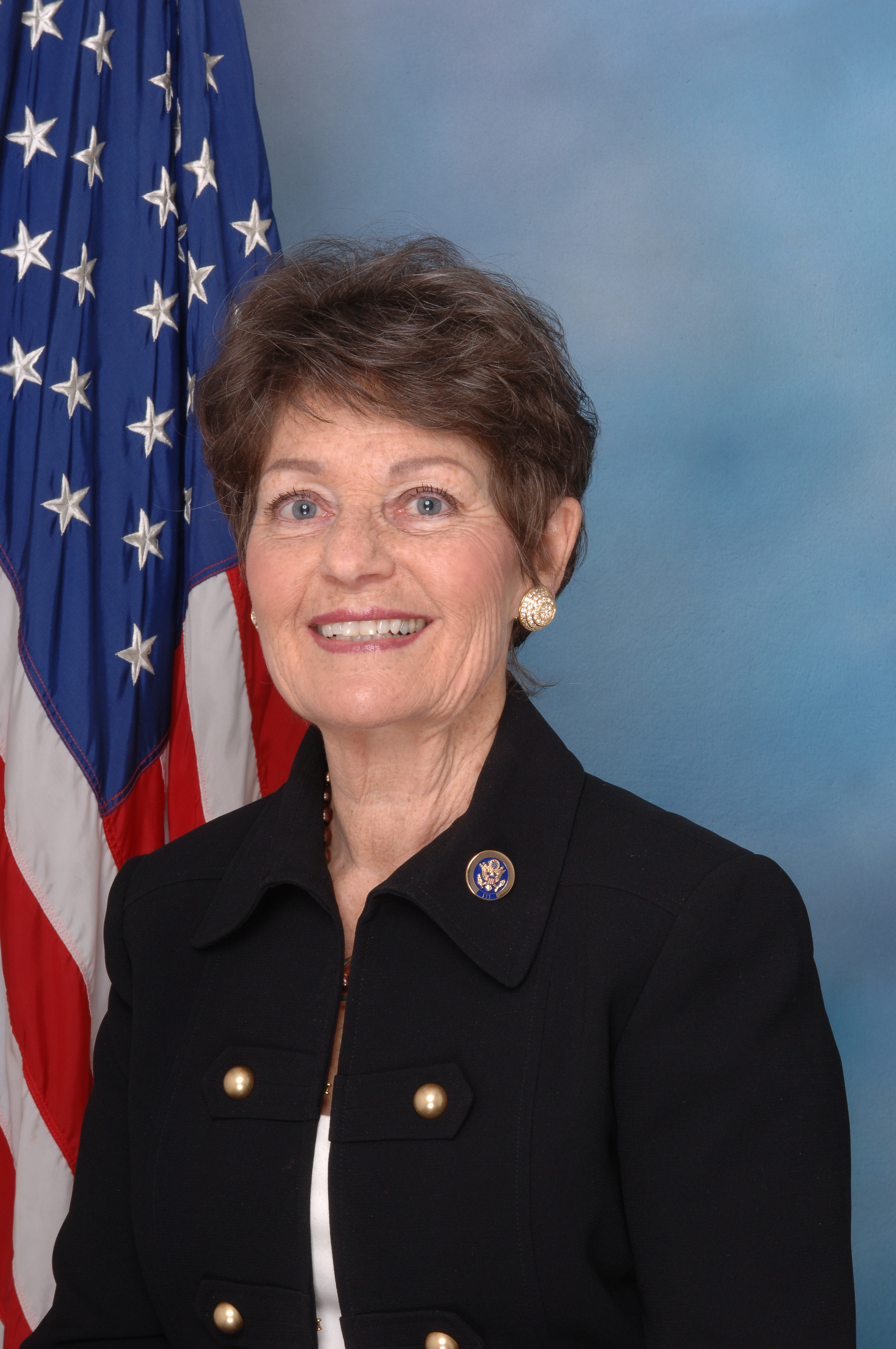
- Official portrait, 2009

Member of the U.S. House of Representatives from Florida's 24th district
- In office January 3, 2009 – January 3, 2011
- Preceded by: Tom Feeney
- Succeeded by: Sandy Adams

Member of the Florida House of Representatives
- In office November 5, 1996 – November 2, 2004
- Preceded by: Jack Ascherl
- Succeeded by: Dorothy Hukill

Personal details
- Born: Suzanne McDonald; February 25, 1944 (age 82) Washington, D.C., U.S.
- Party: Democratic
- Education: Pennsylvania State University; George Mason University; Stetson University (BA)

Suzanne Kosmas (née McDonald; born February 25, 1944) is the former U.S. representative for Florida's 24th congressional district, serving one term from 2009 until 2011. She is a member of the Democratic Party. She previously served in the Florida House of Representatives from 1996 to 2004.

== Early life, education, and career ==
Kosmas has lived in New Smyrna Beach, Florida since 1973. She has owned Prestige Properties of New Smyrna Beach, a real estate company, since 1979. Kosmas attended The Pennsylvania State University and George Mason University, later graduating Phi Beta Kappa from Stetson University in 1998. She was married to Robert Paul Kosmas Sr.

== Florida House of Representatives ==
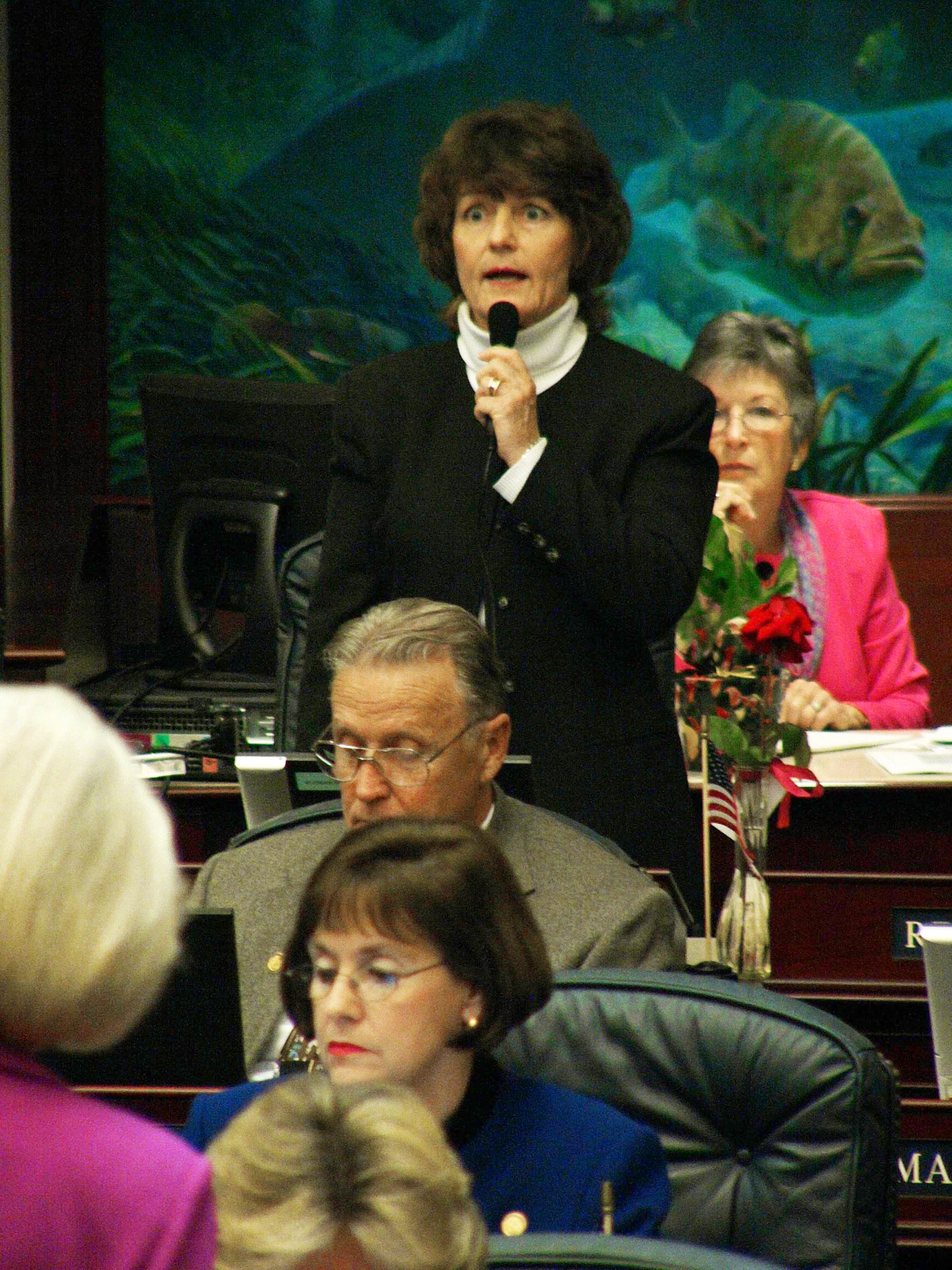
Kosmas as a Florida State Representative

In 1996, when incumbent State Representative Jack Ascherl opted against seeking re-election, Kosmas ran to succeed him in the 28th District, which included eastern Volusia County. She was initially scheduled to face Ted Doran, a Port Orange attorney in the Democratic primary, but at the last minute, Governor Lawton Chiles persuaded Doran to run in the 27th District instead. Accordingly, she won the primary unopposed and, while a contentious Republican primary developed between businessman Fred Cooper and former Daytona Beach Mayor Paul Carpenella, Kosmas was able to raise campaign contributions for the general election. In the general election, Kosmas ended up facing Cooper, and a close election ensued. Republicans, hoping to win a majority in the Florida House of Representatives for the first time since Reconstruction, targeted the 28th District.

Kosmas focused her campaign on economic development, education, juvenile crime, and healthcare. On education, Kosmas emphasized her support for reducing class sizes, accountability for local school districts, and on creating alternative learning environments for disruptive children to develop home-grown solutions could help address the issue. She noted her concern that, while violent crime was decreasing, juvenile crime was increasing, and argued that reducing truancy, using the educational system to identify at-risk children, and working with community leaders to develop home-grown solutions could help address the issue.

Chiles repeatedly visited the district to campaign for Kosmas, arguing that Ascherl left large shoes to fill and that she had the leadership credentials to replace him. Kosmas was also endorsed by the Orlando Sentinel, which argued that she had "a much sharper understanding of issues" than Cooper and that her "extensive hands-on community-service experience" was better-suited than his, and by the Daytona Beach News-Journal, which concluded that she was "extraordinarily well-versed on key issues" and was "much more in touch than Cooper with the needs of the community." The News-Journal also criticized the attack ads that Cooper ran against Kosmas—which called her "Volusia County's Biggest Fraud" and accused her of being a "tax cheat" and a "business fraud"—as "the nastiest and most deceptive ads" in that year's elections. Ultimately, Kosmas ended up narrowly defeating Cooper, winning her first term in the legislature 52–48%, by a little more than 2,000 votes.

=== Re-elections and later terms ===
When Kosmas ran for re-election in 1998, she was opposed by Republican nominee Jerry Gardner, a staffer who had worked at the local state attorney's office and for the State Senate's criminal justice committee. Kosmas emphasized her experience in the legislature, legislative accomplishments, and moderate views, while Gardner argued that she was ideologically out-of-step with the more conservative district. Once again, the News-Journal and the Sentinel endorsed Kosmas, with the Sentinel praising her for her knowledge and "deep concern for her community," while the News-Journal praised "her record and her promise for greater service to come." Kosmas improved on her margin of victory, defeating Gardner 53–47%, winning by around 2,000 votes.

In 2000, Kosmas ran for re-election against former Volusia County School Board Member Deborah Denys, who focused her campaign on her support for charter schools and school vouchers. Kosmas argued that she was an independent legislator and that Denys would vote as "a rubber stamp for the leadership that's already there. She focused on her support for public schools and campaigned against Denys's proposal to provide public funds for private school vouchers, and noted her opposition to abortion regulations. Ultimately, despite the perceived closeness of the race, along with the closeness of the presidential race in Florida, Kosmas vastly improved on her margin of victory over Denys, winning her third term 57–43%.

Due to term limits, Kosmas ran for her fourth and final term in 2002, and she faced Denys once again. Even though her district became more Republican-leaning after redistricting, Kosmas staked out a big fundraising lead over Denys and drew on her popularity in the district. Denys attacked Kosmas for opposing the right to fly the American flag, opposing classrooms displaying the Constitution, and supporting providing drivers licenses to foreign nationals. She argued that the attacks were inaccurate and misstated her record. Ultimately, despite the changes to the district and Governor Jeb Bush's landslide re-election, Kosmas won re-election by a wide margin, receiving 55% of the vote to Denys's 42% and Libertarian nominee Mary Morelly's 3%. When Kosmas was term-limited in 2004, she was succeeded by Republican Dorothy Hukill.

== U.S. House of Representatives ==
=== Tenure ===
In 2009, Kosmas joined with the Democratic majority to vote for the American Recovery and Reinvestment Act of 2009, the Lilly Ledbetter Fair Pay Act of 2009, the American Clean Energy and Security Act, and the Local Law Enforcement Hate Crimes Prevention Act. She originally voted along with 38 other Democrats against the Affordable Health Care for America Act. However, she switched to a "Yes" vote for the Senate version of the bill.

=== Committee assignments ===
- Committee on Financial Services
  - Subcommittee on Capital Markets, Insurance, and Government-Sponsored Enterprises
  - Subcommittee on Domestic Monetary Policy and Technology
  - Subcommittee on Oversight and Investigations
- Committee on Science and Technology
  - Subcommittee on Space and Aeronautics

== Political campaigns ==
=== 2008 ===
Kosmas was one of the top recruits for the Democrats in the 2008 cycle. Despite the wide perception that Feeney had drawn the 24th for himself while still serving as state house speaker (the district included most of his state house district), the district is actually a fairly marginal district on paper, with a Cook Partisan Voting Index of R+4. It includes most of Democratic-leaning Volusia County, where Kosmas lives.

In 2008, Kosmas campaigned on issues such as fiscal conservatism, support for veterans, and values like integrity and transparency. Independent expenditure ads attacked Feeney for his ties to Jack Abramoff, and Feeney's own ad released six weeks prior to the election exacerbated the negative public perception.

In the November election, Kosmas won, taking 57% of the vote to Feeney's 41% — the largest margin of defeat for a Republican incumbent in the 2008 cycle.

=== 2010 ===
Kosmas defeated former Winter Springs Mayor Paul Partyka in the Democratic primary.

Kosmas was defeated for re-election by former State Representative Sandy Adams on Nov. 2, 2010 by a 60% to 40% margin. Ironically, two years after handing Feeney the largest margin of defeat for a Republican incumbent in the 2008 cycle, Kosmas herself lost by the second-largest margin of any Democratic incumbent in the 2010 cycle, after Chet Edwards of Texas.

== Electoral history ==
2008 United States House of Representatives elections in Florida: District 24
Party	Candidate	Votes	%
Democratic	Suzanne Kosmas	211,284	57.20
Republican	Tom Feeney (incumbent)	151,863	41.11
Independent	Gaurav Bhola	6,223	1.68
Total votes		369,370	100.00
Democratic gain from Republican			

2010 United States House of Representatives elections in Florida: District 24
Party	Candidate	Votes	%
Republican	Sandy Adams	146,129	59.66
Democratic	Suzanne Kosmas (incumbent)	98,787	40.34
Total votes		244,916	100.00
Republican gain from Democratic			

== See also ==
- Women in the United States House of Representatives

U.S. House of Representatives
Preceded by Tom Feeney	Member of the U.S. House of Representatives from Florida's 24th congressional district 2009–2011	Succeeded by Sandy Adams
U.S. order of precedence (ceremonial)
Preceded by Tim Mahoney as Former U.S. Representative	Order of precedence of the United States as Former U.S. Representative	Succeeded by Sandy Adams as Former U.S. Representative
