= Sandy Adams =

American politician (born 1956)

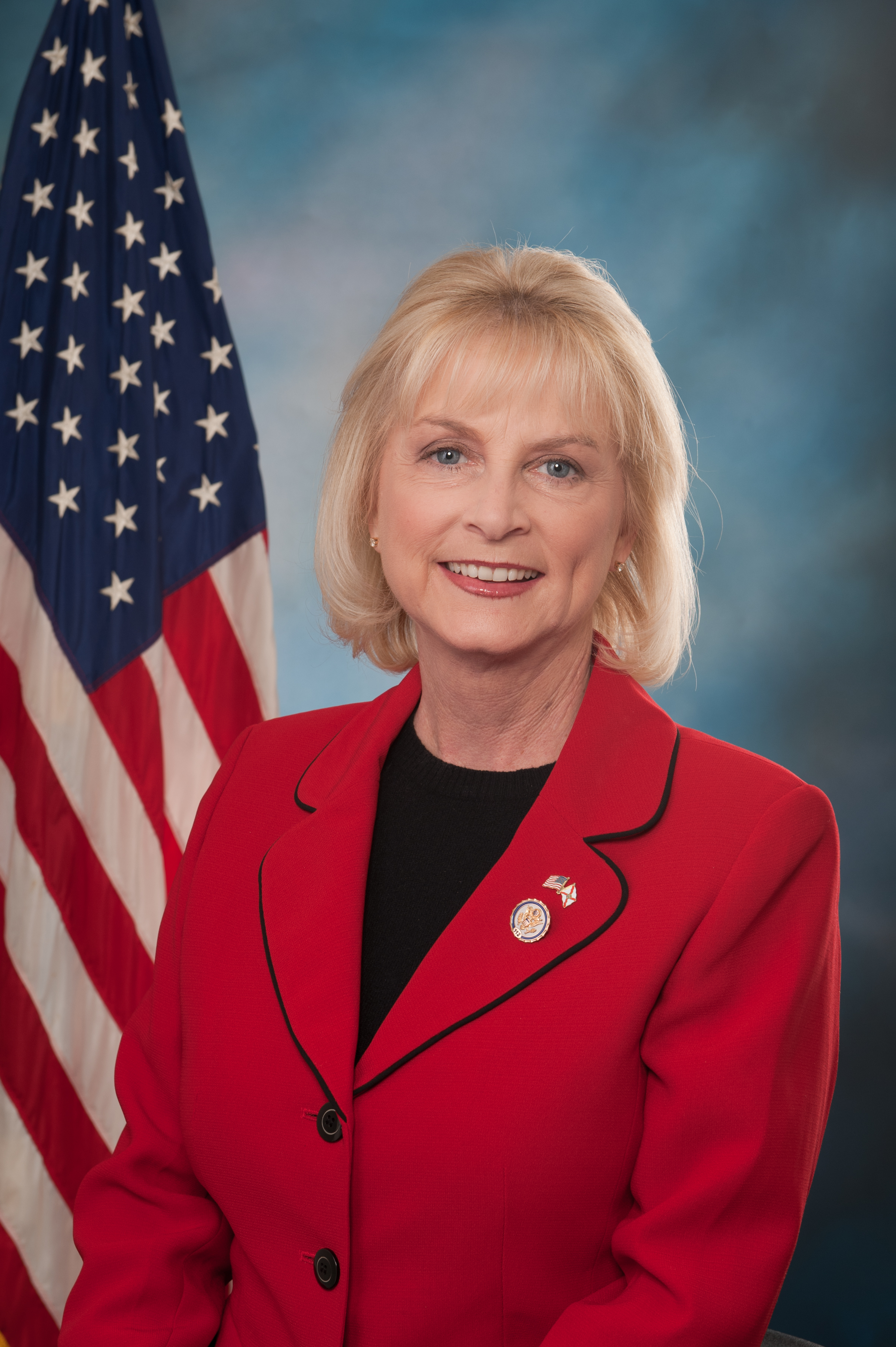
- Official portrait, 2011

Member of the U.S. House of Representatives from Florida's 24th district
- In office January 3, 2011 – January 3, 2013
- Preceded by: Suzanne Kosmas
- Succeeded by: John Mica (redistricted)

Member of the Florida House of Representatives from the 33rd district
- In office November 5, 2002 – November 2, 2010
- Preceded by: Tom Feeney
- Succeeded by: Jason Brodeur

Personal details
- Born: December 14, 1956 (age 69) Wyandotte, Michigan, U.S.
- Party: Republican
- Spouse: John Adams
- Education: Columbia College (BA)

Military service
- Branch/service: United States Air Force
- Years of service: 1974–1975

Sandra Adams (born December 14, 1956) is an American politician and Air Force veteran who served as the U.S. representative for Florida's 24th congressional district from 2011 to 2013. A member of the Republican Party, she previously served in the Florida House of Representatives from 2002 to 2010. In 2012, she was defeated in her bid for re-election after being redistricted to the 7th district.

== Early life, education and career ==
Adams was born in Wyandotte, Michigan in 1956, moving to Florida in 1964. She served in the United States Air Force. In 1985 she became an investigator for the Orange County Sheriff's Office. Over the next couple of years Adams served as Chair of the Orange County Legislative Delegation and is currently the Chair of the Seminole County Legislative Delegation once more. In 2000, she graduated from Columbia College with a Bachelor of Arts degree in Criminal Justice Administration.

== Florida State Legislature ==
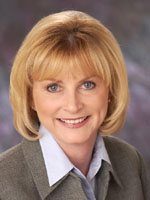
Portrait of State Rep. Sandy Adams.

Adams was first elected to the Florida House in 2002. Within her first two years she served as Chair of the Seminole County Legislative Delegation. Adams was the Chair of the Criminal and Civil Justice Appropriations Committee, Vice-Chair of the Criminal/Civil Justice Policy Council, Vice-Chair of the Public Safety/Domestic Security Policy Committee, and Vice-Chair of the Select Committee on Seminole Indian Compact Review. She served on two councils: the Full Appropriations Council on General Government and Health Care and the Rules and Calendar Council.

== U.S. House of Representatives ==
=== Elections ===
2010

Adams challenged Democratic incumbent Suzanne Kosmas for Florida's 24th congressional district. She filed papers to run in 2009. She defeated Karen Diebel, Tom Garcia, Deon Long and Craig S. Miller in the Republican primary. She was supported by former Alaska Governor and 2008 vice-presidential candidate Sarah Palin. On Election Day, Adams defeated Kosmas, 60%–40%.

2012

Adams originally represented a district that included much of northern Brevard County, including Cape Canaveral and the Kennedy Space Center, as well as portions of Daytona Beach and Orlando.

After redistricting, Adams ran in the newly redrawn Florida's 7th congressional district against fellow U.S. Congressman John Mica in the Republican primary. The new 7th was somewhat more compact than the old 24th, covering much of northern Orlando, as well as most of Seminole County. Adams retained 51 percent of her former territory, while Mica retained 42 percent of his former territory. Ultimately, on August 14, 2012, Mica defeated Adams 60%–40%.

2016

Adams announced her candidacy for the 2016 Republican primary in Florida's 6th congressional district, but she withdrew from the race in January 2016 due to health issues.

=== Committee assignments ===
- Committee on Science, Space and Technology
- Committee on the Judiciary

=== Caucus memberships ===
- Republican Study Committee
- Tea Party Caucus
- Congressional Sportsmen's Caucus

== Personal life ==
Adams and her husband reside in New Smyrna Beach. They have three children. She is an Episcopalian.

== Electoral history ==
2010 United States House of Representatives elections in Florida: District 24
Party	Candidate	Votes	%
Republican	Sandy Adams	146,129	59.66
Democratic	Suzanne Kosmas (incumbent)	98,787	40.34
Total votes		244,916	100.00
Republican gain from Democratic			

2012 Florida Republican primary results
Party	Candidate	Votes	%
Republican	John Mica (incumbent)	32,119	61.2
Republican	Sandy Adams (incumbent)	20,404	38.8
Total votes		52,523	100.0

== See also ==
- Women in the United States House of Representatives

U.S. House of Representatives
Preceded by Suzanne Kosmas	Member of the U.S. House of Representatives from Florida's 24th congressional district 2011–2013	Succeeded by Frederica Wilson
U.S. order of precedence (ceremonial)
Preceded by Suzanne Kosmas as Former U.S. Representative	Order of precedence of the United States as Former U.S. Representative	Succeeded by David Rivera as Former U.S. Representative
