= Evelyn J. Lynn =

American politician (born 1930)

Evelyn Lynn
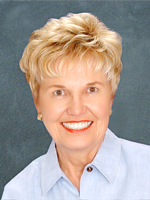

Member of the Florida Senate from the 7th district
- In office November 5, 2002 – November 6, 2012
- Preceded by: Locke Burt (redistricting)
- Succeeded by: Dorothy Hukill (redistricting)

Member of the Florida House of Representatives from the 27th district
- In office November 8, 1994 – November 5, 2002
- Preceded by: Jimmy Charles
- Succeeded by: Pat Patterson (redistricting)

Personal details
- Born: February 2, 1930 (age 96) Astoria, Queens, New York City, New York
- Party: Republican
- Children: 2
- Education: Queens College (B.A.); Stetson University (M.A.); University of Florida (Ed.D.)
- Occupation: Educator

Evelyn J. Lynn (born February 2, 1930) is a Republican politician from Florida who served as a member of the Florida House of Representatives from the 27th district from 1994 to 2002 and as a member of the Florida Senate from the 7th district from 2002 to 2012.

== Early life ==
Lynn was born in Astoria, Queens, in New York City, in 1930, and attended Queens College, graduating with her bachelor's degree in 1950. She moved to Volusia County in 1961, and taught in Volusia County Schools from 1964 to 1989, retiring as an assistant superintendent. Lynn was elected to the Ormond Beach City Commission from Zone 2 in 1991 and was re-elected in 1993.

== Florida House of Representatives ==
In 1994, Lynn announced that she would challenge first-term Democratic State Representative Jimmy Charles for re-election in the Florida House of Representatives from the 27th district. She won the Republican nomination unopposed. During the campaign, Charles was arrested for allegedly soliciting a sex worker as part of a law enforcement sting operation. Though he denied the charges, donations to his campaign fell. Lynn defeated Charles by a wide margin, receiving 59 percent of the vote to his 41 percent.

Lynn ran for re-election in 1996, and was initially challenged by Charles, who was acquitted of soliciting a prostitute after the election. However, Governor Lawton Chiles noted that, if Charles was the nominee, "we would have lost the seat," and persuaded Daytona Beach attorney Ted Doran, who had previously been running in the 28th district, to challenge Lynn instead. Doran won the Democratic primary over Charles, and faced Lynn in the general election. Though the Florida Democratic Party invested in the race, Lynn "handily" beat Doran, winning 57 percent of the vote to Doran's 43 percent.

In 1998, she was challenged by Volusia County Councilwoman Freddie Moore, a Democrat and Lynn's former colleague at Seabreeze High School. Lynn defeated Moore by a wide margin, receiving 63 percent of the vote.

Lynn ran for re-election to a fourth and final term in the House in 2000, and was challenged by music teacher Andrew Spar, who criticized Lynn's decision to support private school vouchers after she had previously opposed it. Lynn won re-election over Spar, but by a narrow margin, receiving 52 percent of the vote to his 48 percent.

== Florida Senate ==
In 2002, State Senator Locke Burt was term-limited, and Lynn ran to succeed him in the renumbered 7th district. Lynn faced fellow State Representative George Albright and nursing home administrator Jon Marc Creighton in the Republican primary, which she won with 52 percent of the vote. In the general election, she was opposed by Democrat Jim Ward, a Volusia County Councilman. Lynn defeated Ward, winning 57 percent of the vote to his 43 percent.

Lynn was re-elected unopposed in 2004. In 2008, when she ran for re-election, she was challenged by independent Richard Paul Dembinsky. Lynn defeated Dembinsky in a landslide, winning 74 percent of the vote to his 26 percent.

In 2012, Lynn was term-limited and unable to seek re-election. Republican State Representative Dorothy Hukill was elected to succeed her in the renumbered 8th district.
