= John Lowndes =

American politician

Member of the Florida Senate from the 10th district
- Incumbent
- Assumed office November 3, 2026
- Preceded by: Jason Brodeur

Personal details
- Party: Democratic

John Lowndes is an American politician. A member of the Democratic Party, he has served in the Florida Senate since 2026, representing the 10th district.
