= Tom Brown (Florida politician) =

American politician (1933–2024)

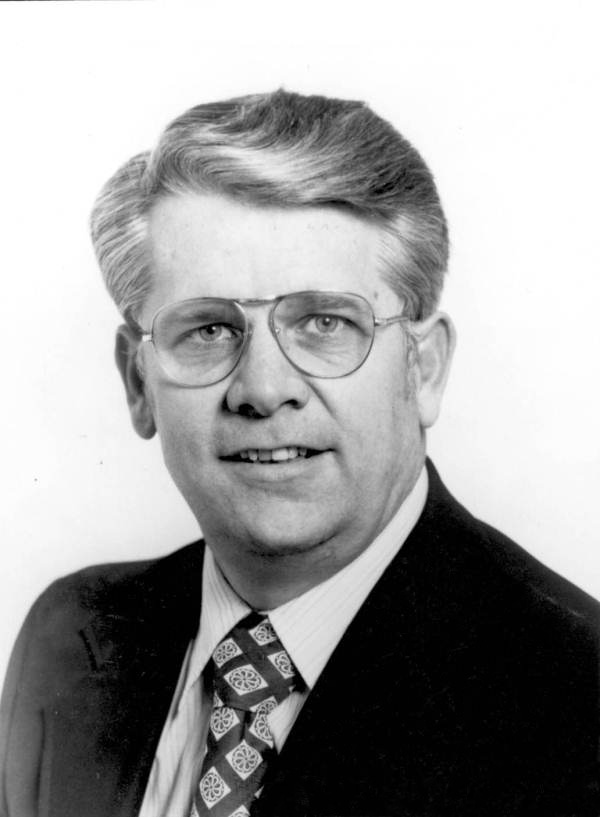

Member of the Florida Senate from the 10th district
- In office November 4, 1986 – June 15, 1991
- Preceded by: Edgar Dunn
- Succeeded by: Locke Burt

Member of the Florida House of Representatives
- In office November 4, 1980 – November 4, 1986
- Preceded by: William R. Conway
- Succeeded by: Jack Ascherl
- Constituency: 29th district (1980–1982); 30th district (1982–1986)

Personal details
- Born: August 26, 1933 Daytona Beach, Florida
- Died: September 1, 2024 (aged 91) Tallahassee, Florida
- Party: Democratic
- Spouse: Jo Young
- Children: 3
- Education: David Lipscomb College (B.A.); University of Florida (M.A.)

Thomas C. Brown (August 26, 1933 – September 1, 2024) was a Democratic politician from Florida who served as a member of the Florida House of Representatives from 1980 to 1986 and as a member of the Florida Senate from the 10th district from 1986 to 1991. He resigned in 1991 to take a position with the Florida Department of Natural Resources.

== Life and career ==
Brown was born in Daytona Beach, Florida, on August 26, 1933. He attended David Lipscomb College, as well as the University of Florida. He served in the Florida House of Representatives for the 29th district from 1980 to 1986, as a Democrat. Brown also served in the Florida Senate from 1987 to 1991 for the 10th district. Brown died following a long illness in Tallahassee, Florida, on September 1, 2024, at the age of 91.

Florida House of Representatives
Preceded by William R. Conway	Member of the Florida House of Representatives from the 29th district 1981–1983	Succeeded by T. K. Wetherell
Preceded by Sam Bell	Member of the Florida House of Representatives from the 30th district 1983–1987	Succeeded by Jack Ascherl
Florida Senate
Preceded by Edgar M. Dunn Jr.	Member of the Florida Senate from the 10th district 1987–1991	Succeeded by Locke Burt
