= Locke Burt =

American politician (born 1948)

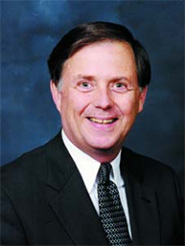

Member of the Florida Senate
- In office July 30, 1991 – November 5, 2002
- Preceded by: Tom Brown
- Succeeded by: Evelyn Lynn (redistricting)
- Constituency: 10th district (1991–1992); 16th district (1992–2002)

Personal details
- Born: February 19, 1948 (age 78) Des Moines, Iowa
- Party: Republican
- Spouse: Ann E. Snyder
- Children: 2
- Education: Northwestern University (B.S.B.A., M.A.); Loyola University Chicago School of Law (J.D.)
- Occupation: Attorney, insurance company executive

Locke Burt (born February 19, 1948) is a Republican politician from Florida who served as a member of the Florida Senate from 1991 to 2002.

Burt endorsed the Ron DeSantis 2024 presidential campaign.
