= Jimmy Charles (politician) =

American politician (born 1960)

Member of the Florida House of Representatives from the 27th district
- In office November 3, 1992 – November 8, 1994
- Preceded by: T. K. Wetherell (redistricting)
- Succeeded by: Evelyn J. Lynn

Personal details
- Born: December 12, 1960 (age 65) Daytona Beach, Florida
- Party: Democratic
- Spouse: Blair Bishop
- Education: University of Florida (B.S., J.D.)
- Occupation: Attorney

Jimmy Charles (born December 12, 1960) is a Democratic politician and attorney from Florida who served as a member of the Florida House of Representatives from the 27th district from 1992 to 1994.

== Early life ==
Charles was born in Daytona Beach, Florida, in 1960, and graduated from Seabreeze High School. He attended the University of Florida, graduating with his bachelor's degree in 1983 and his Juris Doctor in 1986. After graduating, Charles worked as an assistant attorney general, eventually becoming the senior assistant attorney general in the Florida Attorney General's Daytona Beach office.

== Florida House of Representatives ==
In 1992, State House Speaker T. K. Wetherell declined to seek re-election, and Charles ran to succeed him in the renumbered and redrawn 27th district. He faced Beebe White, a member of the Volusia County School Board, in the Democratic primary. Despite entering the race as "a virtual unknown," Charles defeated White, winning 63 percent of the vote to her 37 percent. No other candidate filed for the seat, and Charles won the general election unopposed.

Charles ran for re-election in 1994, and was challenged by Ormond Beach City Commissioner Evelyn Lynn. Two months before the general election, Charles was arrested for allegedly soliciting a sex worker as part of a police sting operation. He denied the charges, stating that he did "missionary work" in the district and mistakenly believed that the undercover officer was someone he had previously helped. However, financial support for his campaign decreased, and he lost the general election to Lynn by a wide margin, winning 41 percent of the vote to her 59 percent.

== Post-legislative career ==
After leaving the legislature, Charles stood trial for solicitation of sex, and was acquitted on May 11, 1995.

In 1996, Charles announced that he would seek a rematch with Lynn. However, out of concern that Charles would jeopardize the party's chances of winning the seat, Governor Lawton Chiles persuaded attorney Ted Doran to end his campaign in the 28th district and instead run in the 27th district. Charles lost the Democratic primary to Doran, receiving 37 percent of the vote to Doran's 63 percent.

Charles subsequently sued the police departments in Daytona Beach Shores and Port Orange in federal court, arguing that his civil rights were violated when he was arrested. The lawsuit was dismissed by Judge G. Kendall Sharp of the Middle District of Florida, who concluded that the officers had probable cause to make the arrest.
