= W. Turner Davis =

American politician

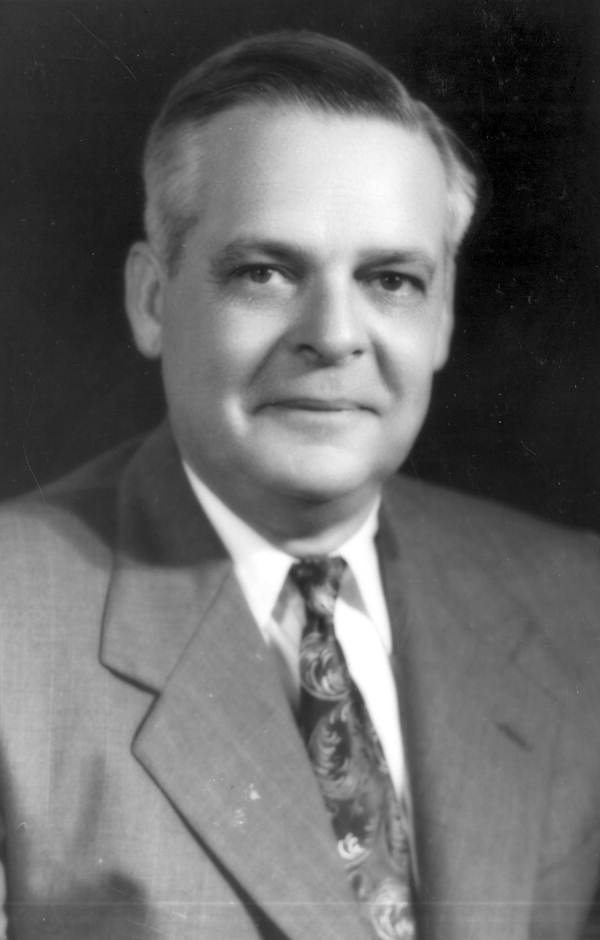

Member of the Florida Senate from the 10th district
- In office 1943–1961

Personal details
- Born: William Turner Davis; August 1, 1901 Madison, Florida, U.S.
- Died: June 18, 1988 (aged 86) Madison, Florida, U.S.
- Party: Democratic
- Spouse: Dotsie Beggs
- Education: University of Florida
- Occupation: lawyer

William Turner Davis (August 1, 1901 – June 18, 1988) was an American politician in the state of Florida.

Davis was born in Madison, Florida in 1901 and attended local schools for his primary education. His father, Charles Davis also served in the Florida Senate, and was its president in 1915. He attended Virginia Military Institute and the University of Florida and was admitted to the Florida bar in 1924. Davis served in the Florida State Senate from 1943 to 1961 as a Democratic member for the 10th district. He was the body's president in 1955, and he was a member of the Pork Chop Gang, a group of legislators from rural areas that dominated the state legislature due to malapportionment and used their power to engage in McCarthyist tactics. He also previously served as mayor of his hometown of Madison.

Davis died at the age of 86 in 1988 after a brief illness and was buried at Oak Ridge Cemetery in Madison.
