= Jack Ascherl =

American politician

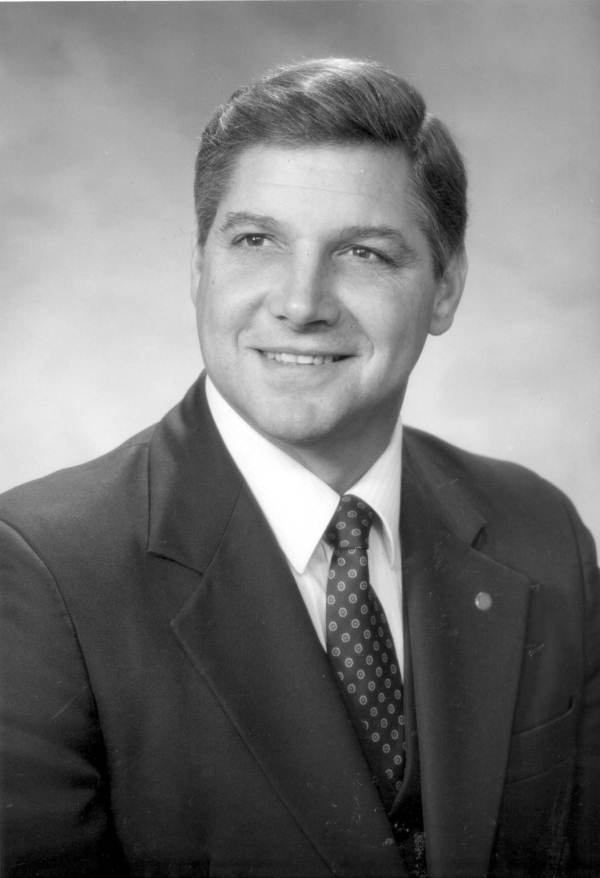
- Ascherl in 1986

Member of the Florida House of Representatives
- In office November 4, 1986 – November 5, 1996
- Preceded by: Tom Brown
- Succeeded by: Suzanne Kosmas
- Constituency: 30th district (1986–1992); 28th district (1992–1996)

Personal details
- Born: February 12, 1937 (age 89) Daytona Beach, Florida
- Party: Democratic

Jack Ascherl (born February 12, 1937) is an American former politician in the state of Florida.

Ascherl was born in Daytona Beach. An alumnus of Florida State University, he is a Chartered Life Underwriter (CLU) and Chartered Financial Consultant (ChFC). He served in the Florida House of Representatives from 1986 to 1996 for district 28. He was speaker pro tempore of the House from 1995 to 1996. He is a member of the Democratic Party.
