= Alfred Brown Osgood =

American legislator and Christian minister

Florida House of Representatives
- In office 1868–1874

Florida State Senate
- In office 1875–1876

Personal details
- Born: July 16, 1843 Florida
- Died: 1911 (aged 67–68)
- Party: Republican

Alfred Brown Osgood (July 16, 1843 - 1911) was a state legislator and a Christian minister in Florida. He served in the Florida House of Representatives and the Florida Senate.

== Biography ==
He was born enslaved July 16, 1843 in Madison, Florida. He worked as a shoemaker and A.M.E. minister.

On July 27, 1867 Osgood registered as a voter in Madison County having lived in the state for at least 12 months. Osgood was elected to the Florida House in 1868 as a Republican. He was allied to David Montgomery. He resigned in 1873 as a result of a policy that forbade state and county officeholders from also having any federal appointments. In 1874 he ran for speaker of the house, but was defeated by fellow Republican Malachi Martin due to his connection to Montgomery. The Republican Party had divisions between African American Floridians and northerners who relocated from northern states seeking office, derisively termed carpetbaggers.

A Republican he represented Madison and served in 1868 until 1874 and in 1879, 1883, and 1885. He also served in the state senate in 1875 and 1876.

In November 1874 he was elected to the Florida State Senate for the 10th senatorial district beating George Franklin Drew. After his term he joined the African Methodist Episcopal Church clergy. He was still active in politics a member of the state central committee in December 1907.

== See also ==
- African American officeholders from the end of the Civil War until before 1900
