= Colony Hotel & Cabaña Club =

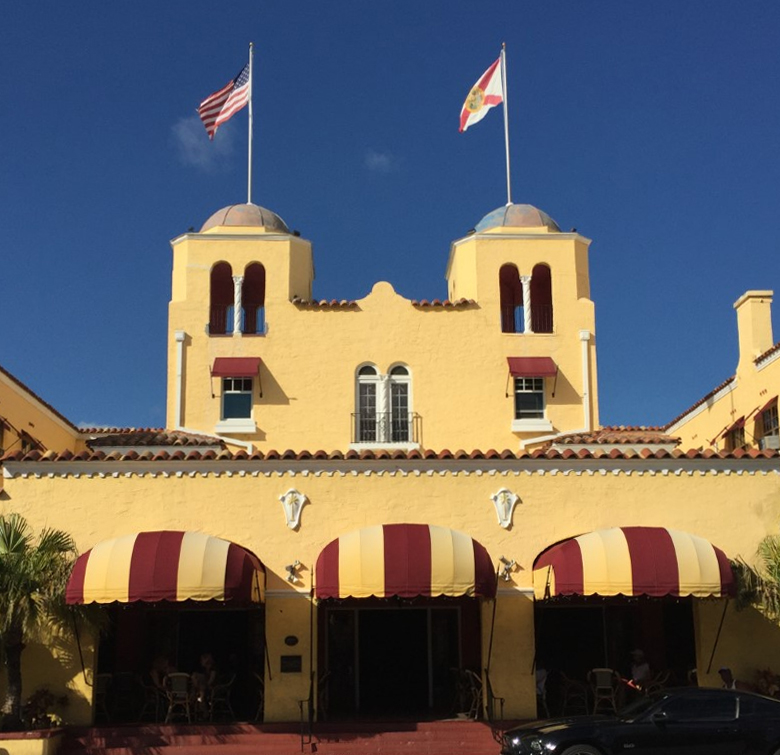

- Location within Florida

General information
- Location: 525 E. Atlantic Ave, Delray Beach, Florida
- Coordinates: 26.461930°N 80.067428°W

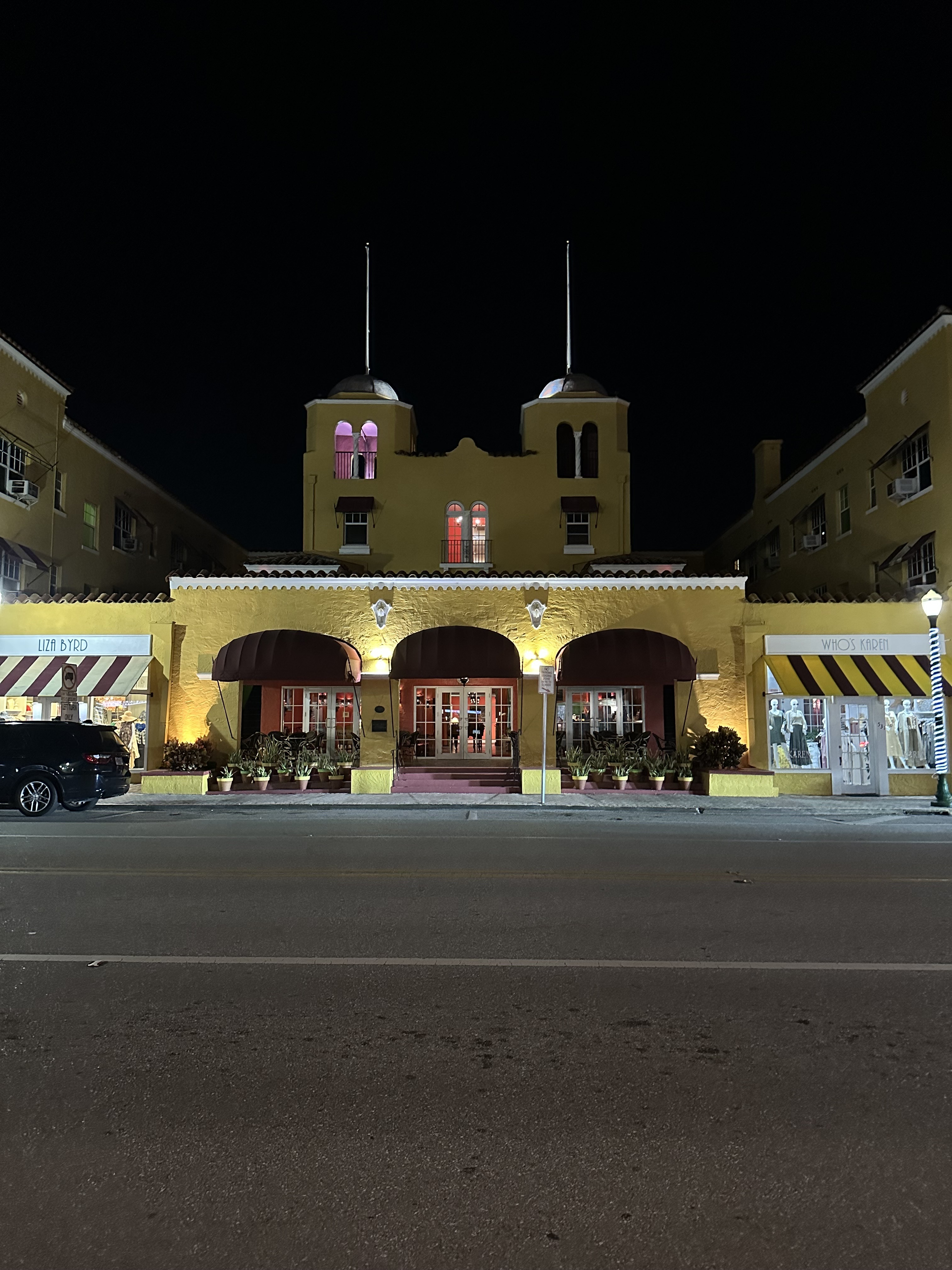
Colony Hotel & Cabaña Club at night in November 2025

The Colony Hotel & Cabaña Club, in Delray Beach, Florida, is a Spanish Colonial Revival-style hotel dating from 1926, plus a separate beach-side recreation area with pool and cabañas. The hotel features Florida Mediterranean architecture in a three-story building with two domed towers. It has been described as "the best known landmark" in Delray Beach.

The hotel, initially known as the Alterep Hotel, was built in 1925 by a group of investors led by Albert T. Repp (for whom the hotel was named). The cost was estimated at $250,000 and another $100,000 for furnishings. It opened in approximately January 1926. After the hotel struggled and went into receivership, it was purchased for $50,000 in 1935 by George Boughton. He renamed it the Colony and owned it until his death in 1986. While under Boughton's ownership, the Colony was open only seasonally from January to April. Boughton owned another hotel in Maine that he operated during the remaining months of the year.

The property includes the Colony Hotel, at 525 East Atlantic Avenue, and the Colony Cabaña Club, at 1801 South Ocean Boulevard. The hotel is in the center of the city, and the cabaña club is on the ocean, 2.2 miles (3.5 km) to the east and south from the hotel. In 2022 it is a member of Historic Hotels of America a program of the National Trust for Historic Preservation.
