= National Register of Historic Places listings in Levy County, Florida =

Location of Levy County in Florida

This is a list of the National Register of Historic Places listings in Levy County, Florida.

This is intended to be a complete list of the properties and districts on the National Register of Historic Places in Levy County, Florida, United States. The locations of National Register properties and districts for which the latitude and longitude coordinates are included below, may be seen in a map.

There are 4 properties and districts listed on the National Register in the county.

This National Park Service list is complete through NPS recent listings posted March 21, 2025.

Contents: Counties in Florida (non-linked contain no National Register listings)
Alachua - Baker - Bay - Bradford - Brevard - Broward - Calhoun - Charlotte - Citrus - Clay - Collier - Columbia - DeSoto - Dixie - Duval - Escambia - Flagler - Franklin - Gadsden - Gilchrist - Glades - Gulf - Hamilton - Hardee - Hendry - Hernando - Highlands - Hillsborough (Tampa) - Holmes - Indian River - Jackson - Jefferson - Lafayette - Lake - Lee - Leon - Levy - Liberty - Madison - Manatee - Marion - Martin - Miami-Dade (Miami) - Monroe - Nassau - Okaloosa - Okeechobee - Orange - Osceola - Palm Beach - Pasco - Pinellas - Polk - Putnam - St. Johns - St. Lucie - Santa Rosa - Sarasota - Seminole - Sumter - Suwannee - Taylor - Union - Volusia - Wakulla - Walton - Washington

== Current listings ==
	Name on the Register	Image	Date listed	Location	City or town	Description
1	Cedar Keys Historic and Archaeological District	Cedar Keys Historic and Archaeological District	October 3, 1989 (#88001449)	Address Restricted	Cedar Key	
2	Citizens Bank	Citizens Bank	November 29, 1995 (#95001369)	5 North Main Street; 29°23′15″N 82°26′50″W	Williston	
3	Island Hotel	Island Hotel	November 23, 1984 (#84000252)	224 2nd Street; 29°08′14″N 83°01′52″W	Cedar Key	
4	Eugene Knotts House		February 1, 2018 (#100002066)	1 Genie Ct. 29°02′00″N 82°41′52″W	Yankeetown	On private property, not visible from public land

== See also ==
- List of National Historic Landmarks in Florida
- National Register of Historic Places listings in Florida
