= Cedar Key Historical Museum =

Cedar Key Historical Society and Museum
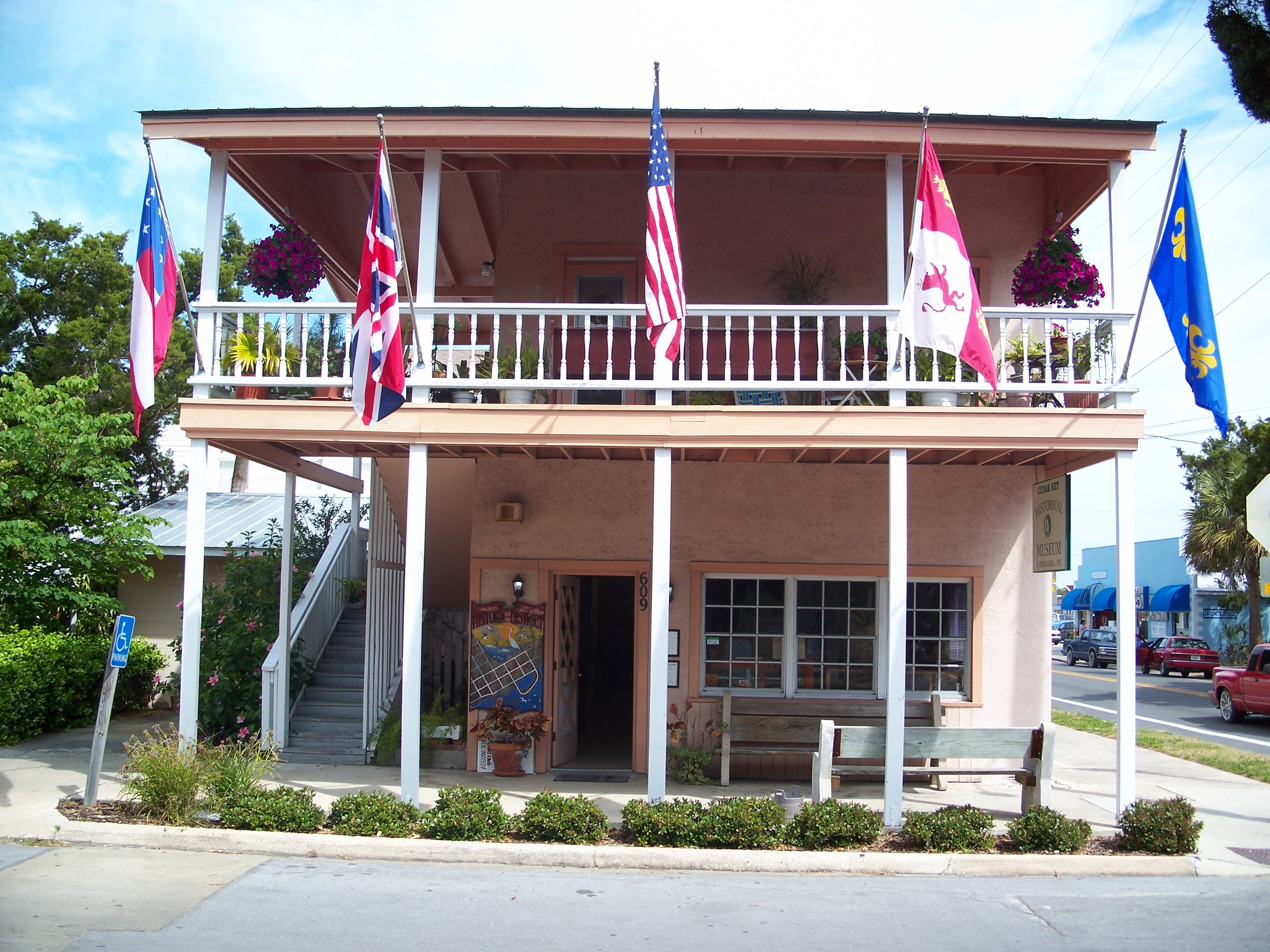
- Lutterloh House, main entrance to the museum

- Location within Florida
- Established: 1977
- Location: 609 2nd Street Florida State Road 24; Cedar Key, Florida
- Coordinates: 29.13627°N 83.03343°W
- Type: History Museum
- Director: Anna White Hodges
- Website: Cedar Key Historical Society and Museum

The Cedar Key Historical Society and Museum is located at 609 2nd Street State Road 24, Cedar Key, Florida. It contains exhibits and photographs depicting the history of Cedar Key from prehistoric times through the 20th century, Cedar Key Historical Society, 2008. Accessed August 16, 2008 (updated 09/21/21 WebDev). The museum complex is composed of two buildings, the Lutterloh House serving as the main entrance and the annex is the Andrews House, which was originally on Atsena Otie Key before being moved to the mainland after the 1896 hurricane. It is part of the Cedar Keys Historic and Archaeological District.

In 1989, it was listed as the John Lutterloh Residence - Cedar Key Historical Society and Museum in A Guide to Florida's Historic Architecture, published by the University of Florida Press.
