= Florida Man (disambiguation) =

Florida Man is an internet meme.

Florida Man may also refer to:

- Florida Man, 2019 play by Michael Presley Bobbitt
- Florida Man (TV series), 2023 Netflix TV series starring Édgar Ramírez
- "Florida Man", album track by Blue Öyster Cult from The Symbol Remains (2020)
- Florida Man, comic book by Mike Baron

== See also ==
- List of people from Florida for a list of men from Florida
