= Atsena Otie Key =

Island

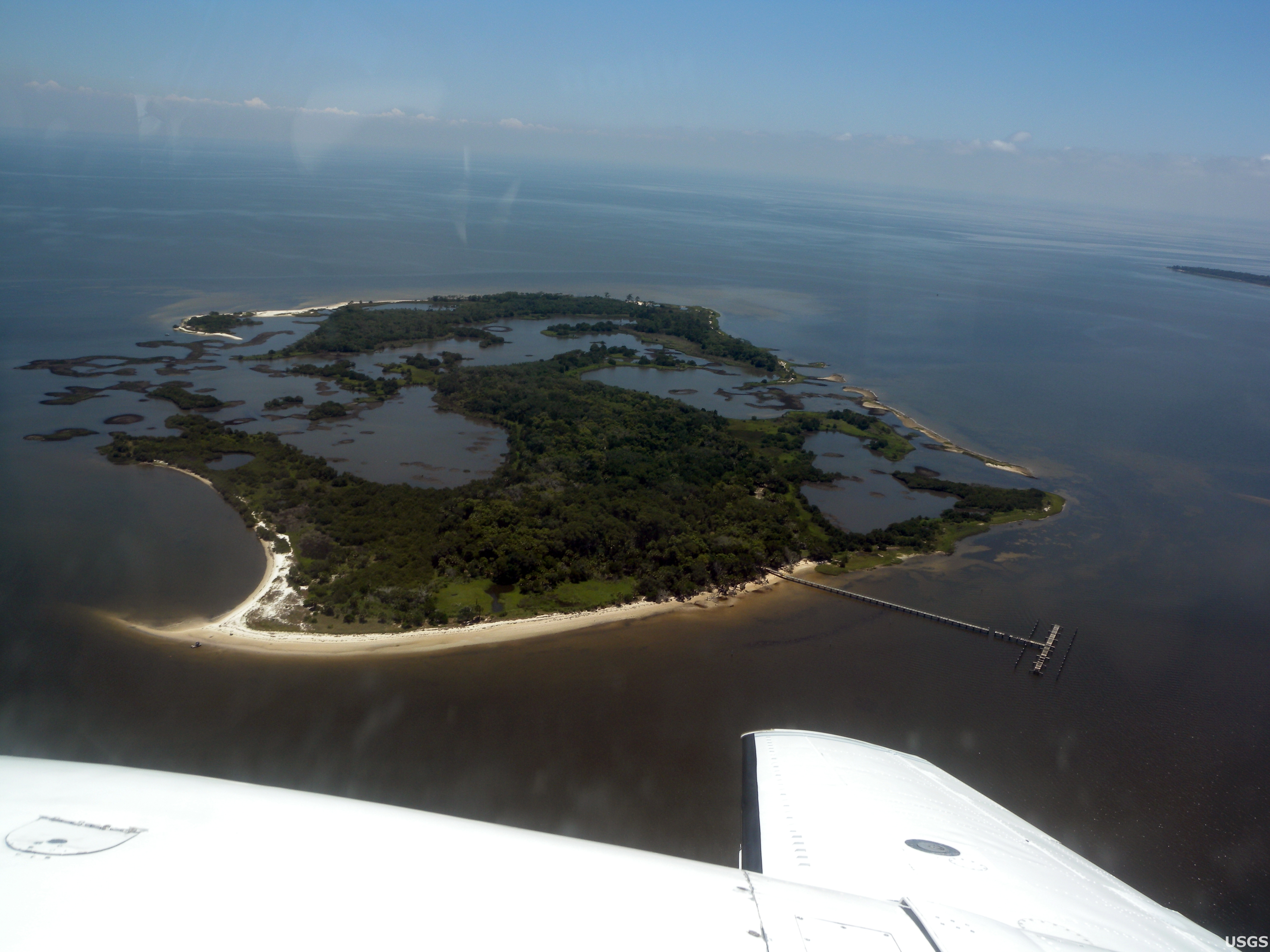
- Atsena Otie Key

- Atsena Otie Key

Geography
- Coordinates: 29°07′25.6″N 83°01′51.6″W
- Adjacent to: Gulf of Mexico

Administration
- United States
- State: Florida
- County: Levy

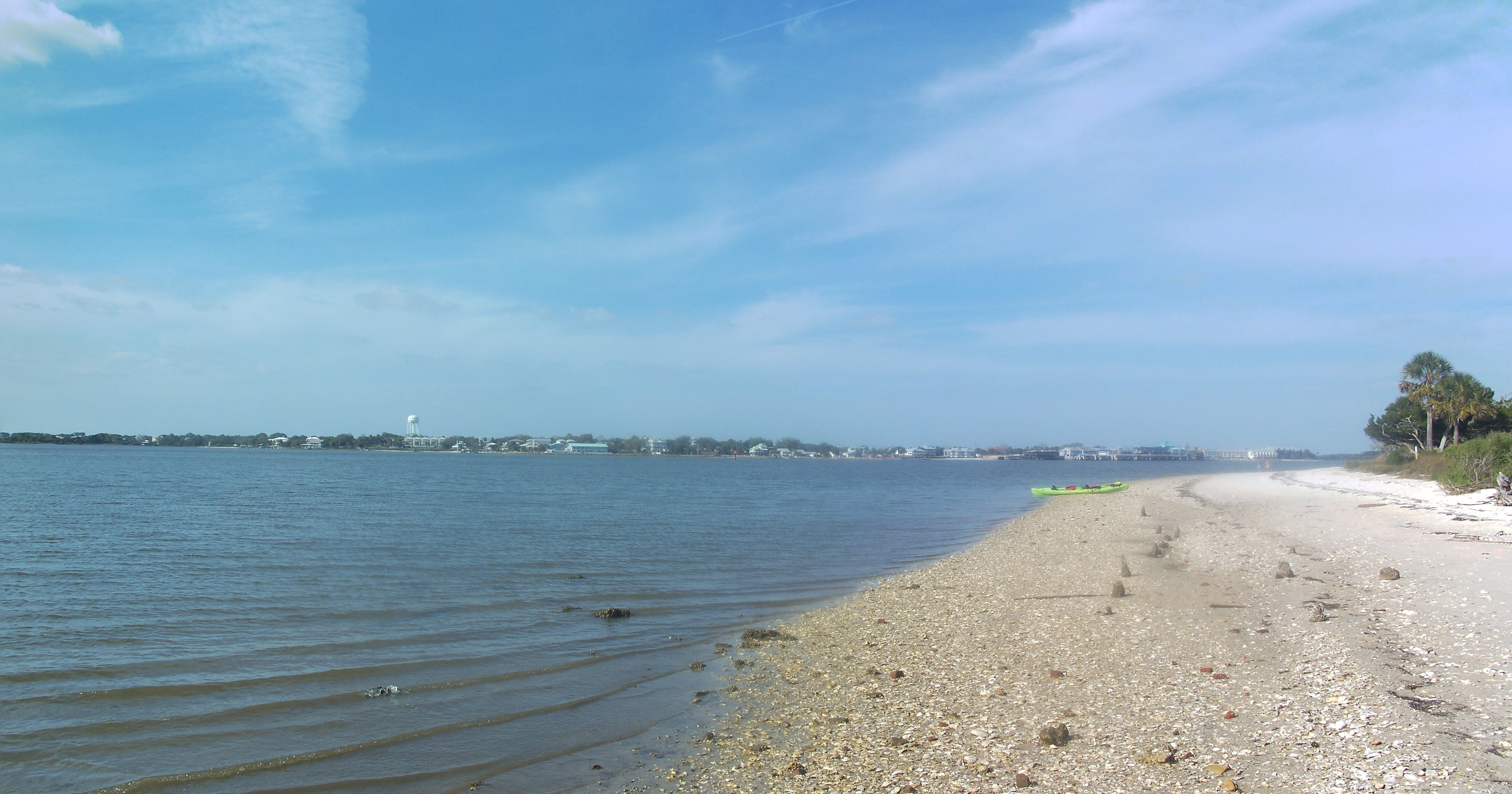
Looking towards Cedar Key from Atsena Otie Key

Atsena Otie Key is an island and ghost town one-half mile offshore of Cedar Key, Florida. The island, called Depot Key at the time, was the site of a US Army post during the Second Seminole War. The island was renamed after the war and was the site of the town of Atsena Otie in the latter half of the 19th century until it was largely destroyed by a hurricane in 1896. The island now includes a walking trail, swimming area, and ruins of the Eberhard Faber mill. The property is part of the Cedar Key National Wildlife Refuge and is managed by the U.S. Fish and Wildlife Service.

== History ==
=== Early years ===
A skeleton found on the island in 1999 was determined to be more than 2,000 years old, attesting to the occupation of the island by Native Americans at that time. In the early 16th century, Spanish explorers reached the Gulf coast of Florida and left their mark in many ways. By the early 17th century, the native population had died off severely due to diseases brought by Europeans. By the 19th century most of the island's indigenous people had been forced to move to reservations out West.

=== First and Second Seminole Wars ===
From 1818 to the early 1820s the island was used as a trading post, and was important during the First Seminole War. It remained as such until Florida was made a U.S. Territory in 1821. In 1840 General Walker Keith Armistead, commander at that time of United States troops in the Second Seminole War, ordered construction of a hospital on the island. U.S. Army headquarters for the war in Florida were moved to the island, and it became known as Depot Key. In August, 1842 Colonel William J. Worth, commander of the U.S. Army in Florida, met with Seminole leaders on Depot Key and negotiated an agreement that if the Seminoles retreated to southernmost Florida and stayed there the Army would leave them be. On the basis of this agreement, Colonel Worth declared the Second Seminole War to be over. In October, 1842 Depot Key was hit by a hurricane that caused so much damage that the Army abandoned the post.

=== Economic growth ===
In 1843 Augustus Steele claimed Depot Key under the Armed Occupation Act of 1842. He renamed the island Atsena Otie Key and built summer cottages for wealthy Florida and Georgia planters. The meaning of the name and Steele's reason for choosing it are unclear. The Cedar Key Post Office was established in 1845, with Augustus Steele as the first postmaster.

During the 1850s trade grew on the island. A lighthouse serving the Cedar Keys harbor was built on Seahorse Key and put into operation in 1854. The Florida Railroad (which ran across Florida from Fernandina) reached the Cedar Keys in 1861, and a terminal was constructed on Way Key (to the north of Atsena Otie Key). In 1855 A. W. Faber bought large tracts of land in Levy County to be cut for timber. A small amount of land was bought on the island in 1856, which would later become the site for a lumber mill.

Then in January 1858 the town of Atsena Otie was officially chartered by the Florida State legislature. By the time of the 1860 Census there were 215 men, women, and children living in 30 households on the island.

=== Civil War ===
The American Civil War brought both hardship and conflict to Atsena Otie Key. The harbor was blockaded by the Union Navy's Gulf Blockade Squadron out of Key West. Very soon shipping and fishing were brought to a halt.

==== Battle of Cedar Key ====
On 7 January 1862 the USS Hatteras landed U.S. Navy sailors and Marines and attacked the rail head at Station No. 4. They were at first repulsed by a company of Florida state cavalry and local civilian workers, but succeeded in destroying the tracks, engines, and buildings before they retreated to the ship. Then the Hatteras boarded and either sank or burned seven blockade runners in the harbor at Depot Key, and landed a small force to burn the harbor facilities. This small but important event has become known as the Battle of Cedar Key.

==== USS Somerset ====
The USS Somerset captured the blockade runner Curlew off Atsena Otie Key in June 1862; and later she destroyed the salt works on James Island near Depot Key in October. This was very disastrous as the Union sailors accounted for some two thousand bushels of salt destroyed, with all the works. They also captured many civilian workers, slaves and horses.

=== Reconstruction ===
The Eberhard Faber Pencil Company built a lumber mill in 1868 on Atsena Otie Key to supply wood for its pencil factory in New Jersey. The area revived as a shipping port and much lumber was milled.

By the 1870s the oyster, green turtle, and fishing industries had also grown on the island. By the 1890s lumber production was making a profit of almost $900,000, and the Faber Mill alone produced wood for casing more than a third of a million pencils. The town grew as well, and by 1895 there were more than 50 households back living on the island.

=== 1896 Cedar Keys hurricane ===
A powerful hurricane and a 10-foot storm surge crossed the island on September 29, 1896. The Eberhard Faber mill was destroyed and the island was wrecked except for a few houses. The cedar forests that fed the mills on Atsena Otie Key had mostly been cut over, and the mill companies did not consider it worth while to rebuild. A business building and several houses that escaped destruction were floated across to Cedar Key (formerly Way Key), and lumber salvaged from the wreckage of the mills was used for construction on Cedar Key. While most residents moved from Atsena Otie Key to Cedar Key after the hurricane, some stayed into the 20th century. The last wooden house standing on the island was torn down in the 1940s and the lumber was taken to Cedar Key.

=== Modern history ===
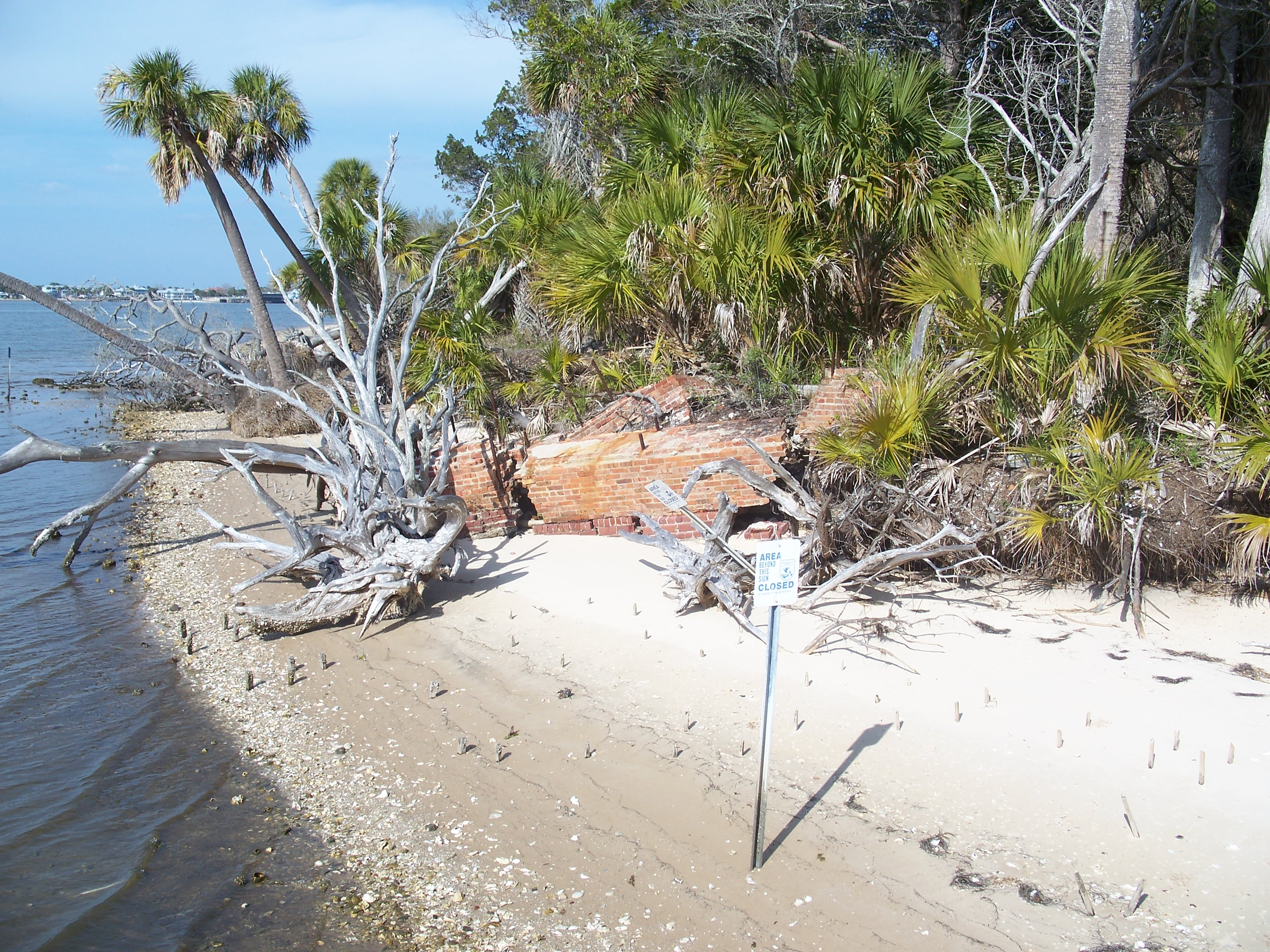
Atsena Otie Key today

In 1923 Atsena Otie Key was purchased for $500, and in 1929 the Cedar Keys National Wildlife Refuge established on nearby Snake, Bird, and North Keys. In 1950 the last remaining house on the island was destroyed by Hurricane Easy.

In 1997 Atsena Otie Key was sold to the Suwannee River Water Management District who entered into a Memorandum of Understanding with the U.S. Fish and Wildlife Service to have the island managed as part of the Cedar Keys NWR. The island is open for public use.

== Sources ==
- Mahon, John K. (1985). History of the Second Seminole War: 1835-1842 (Revised ed.). Gainesville, Florida: University Presses of Florida. p. 279. ISBN 0-8130-1097-7.
- McCarthy, Kevin M. (2006). Cedar Key, Florida: An Illustrated History. Gainesville, Florida: Nature Coast Publishing House. ISBN 978-1-4276-0897-0.
