= Cedar Key School =

Public K-12 school in Cedar Key, Florida, U.S.

Coordinates: 29.1399°N 83.0390°W

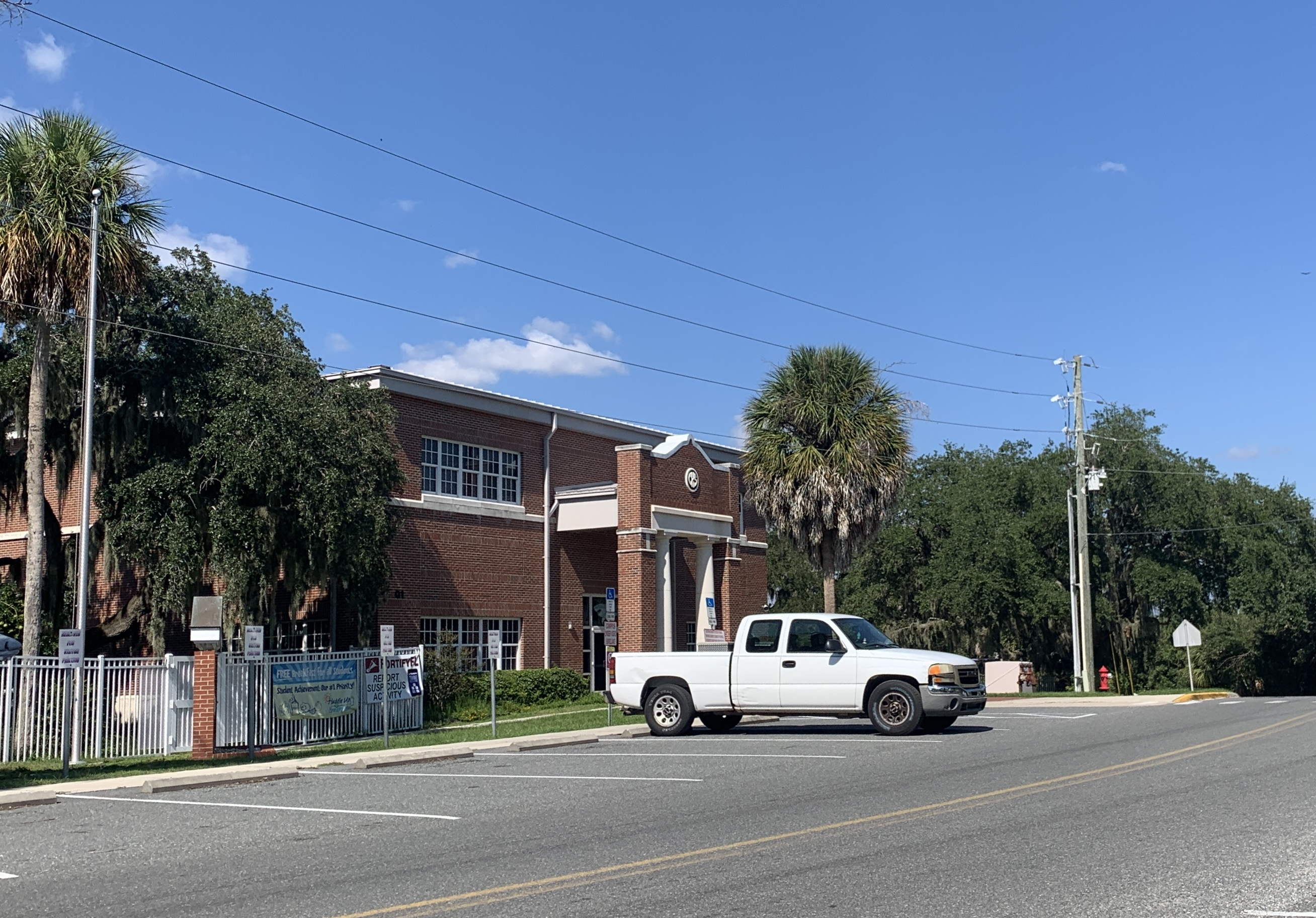

Location
- 951 Whiddon Avenue; Cedar Key, Florida; United States

Information
- Type: Public high school
- Established: 1800s
- School district: School Board of Levy County
- NCES District ID: 1201140
- NCES School ID: 120114001198
- Principal: Joshua Slemp
- Staff: 16.50 (FTE)
- Grades: Pre K–12th
- Enrollment: 193 (2023–2024)
- Student to teacher ratio: 11.70
- Colors: Purple and gold
- Mascot: Sharks
- Website: www.levyk12.org/cks

Cedar Key School is a public K-12 school located in Cedar Key, Florida, U.S.. It was founded as a private school in the 19th century and is the smallest public high school in the state of Florida.

== Notable alumni ==
- W. Randolph Hodges - former President of the Florida Senate
- Gene Hodges - former member of the Florida House of Representatives
