= Michael Bobbitt =

Michael Bobbitt may refer to:

- Michael J. Bobbitt, American playwright, director and choreographer based in Boston
- Michael Presley Bobbitt, American playwright and novelist based in Florida
