= Faye Culp =

American politician

Faye B. Culp
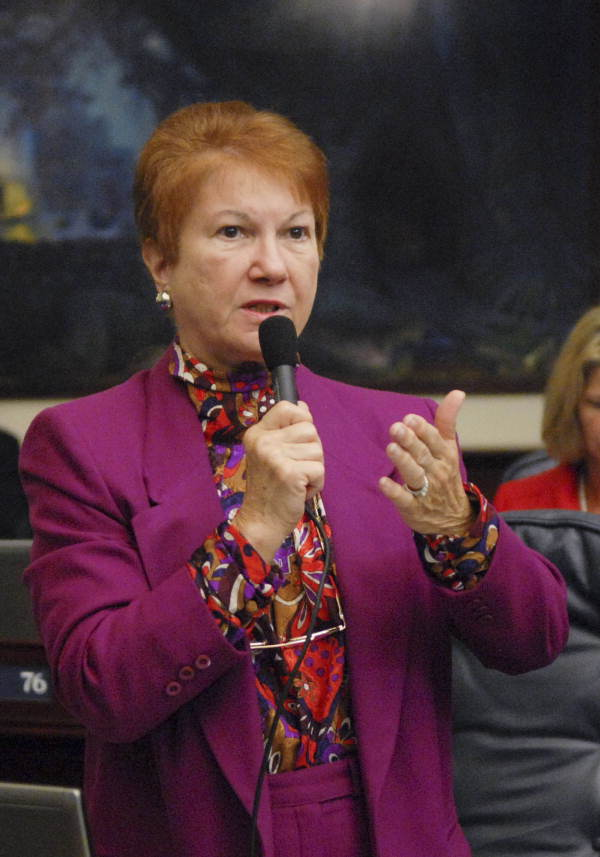

Member of the Florida House of Representatives from the 57th district
- In office 2002–2010
- Preceded by: Chris Hart IV
- Succeeded by: Dana Young
- In office 1994–1998
- Preceded by: Ron Glickman
- Succeeded by: Chris Hart IV

Personal details
- Born: December 6, 1939 (age 86)
- Party: Republican
- Spouse: Jim Culp
- Profession: Marketing Executive

Faye B. Culp is a retired educator and Republican politician who served as the District 57 Representative in the Florida House of Representatives. She was the first female Republican to serve as Majority Whip in the Florida House.

Representative Culp was born in Kilmichael, Mississippi on December 6, 1939. She graduated from the Mississippi University for Women in 1961 with a Bachelor of Science degree in education. She taught school from 1961 to 1966 in Georgia. She worked for IBM from 1966 to 1968, and moved to Florida in 1968. She sold real estate from 1974 to 1976. From 1988 to 1992, she served as a Hillsborough County School Board member. In 1993, she received a Master of Arts degree from the University of South Florida. She was first elected to the Florida House in 1994 and served a second term. She bid unsuccessfully for the Florida Senate in 2000. She was again elected to the House in 2002 and to three successive terms in the Tampa, Florida area. In 2008, she received a Ph.D. from Argosy University. Rep. Culp was term-limited out of office at the end of her fourth term and endorsed Dana Young in the Republican Primary. Ms. Young won the District 57 seat in the general election. Culp is one of the founders of Maggie's List.

== Sources ==
- Day, Sherri. "State House 57." St. Petersburg Times. October 26, 2004. Online. January 15, 2009.
- Florida House of Representatives Profile
- Project Vote Smart profile
- Bay Buzz, St. Petersburg Times Blogs February 3, 2010
- Election Results, TBO.com November 2, 2010
