= Cedar Key Light =

Lighthouse in Florida, US

- The Cedar Key lighthouse around 1894.
- Location: on Seahorse Key three miles southwest of Cedar Key, Florida
- Coordinates: 29°5′47.33″N 83°3′55.2″W

Tower
- Constructed: 1854
- Foundation: granite pilings with platform
- Construction: brick tower
- Height: 28 feet (8.5 m)
- Shape: hexagonal tower with balcony and lantern atop keeper's house
- Markings: white tower and lantern
- Operator: University of Florida Seahorse Key Marine Laboratory

Light
- Deactivated: 1915
- Focal height: 75 feet (23 m)
- Lens: fourth-order Fresnel lens

The Cedar Key Light is located on Seahorse Key across the harbor from Cedar Key, Florida. Seahorse Key was the site a watchtower erected in 1801 by followers of William Augustus Bowles, self-designated Director General of the State of Muskogee, an attempt to set up an independent state in the western part of East Florida. The watchtower was destroyed by a Spanish naval force in 1802. Seahorse Key was used as a detention center for Seminoles captured in the Second Seminole War (1835–1842) before transfer to the West. At that time the Federal government reserved several of the islands in the Cedar Keys archipelago for military use.

Cedar Key became an important port during the 1840s, and in 1850 Congress appropriated funding for a lighthouse on Seahorse Key. Lieutenant George Meade helped design the lighthouse. The lighthouse was completed and lit in 1854. At the beginning of the American Civil War Confederate sympathizers extinguished the light. Federal troops occupied Seahorse Key in 1862, and used it as a prison for the duration of the war. The lighthouse was put back into service after the war ended.

The lighthouse building was tripled in size in 1905 when a U.S. Navy wireless station was established there. The light was taken out of commission in 1915. Seahorse Key, including the lighthouse, became part of the Cedar Keys National Wildlife Refuge, established in 1929. The University of Florida has leased 3.2 acres (1.3 ha) of the wildlife refuge, including the lighthouse, for use as a marine laboratory since 1952. The lighthouse is used as a dormitory for students. The Cedar Key lighthouse is the oldest standing lighthouse on the west coast of Florida.

== See also ==
- List of lighthouses in Florida
- List of lighthouses in the United States
