= Chris Hart IV =

American politician (born 1968)

Chris Hart
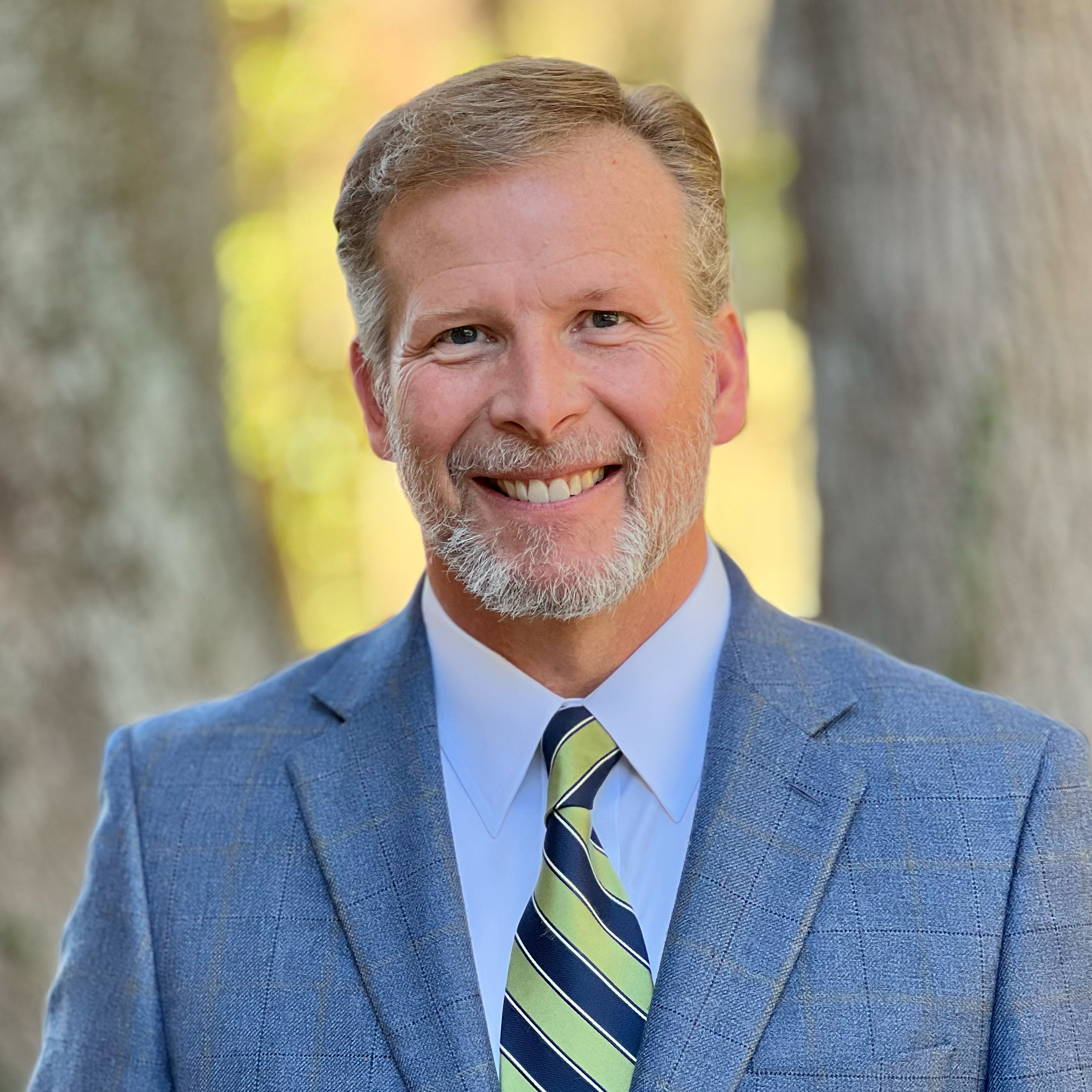

Member of the Florida House of Representatives from the 57th district
- In office November 3, 1998 – November 5, 2002
- Preceded by: Faye Culp
- Succeeded by: Faye Culp

Personal details
- Born: August 11, 1968 (age 57) Fort Benning, Georgia
- Party: Republican
- Spouse: Amy
- Children: 2
- Education: Florida State University (B.S.); University of South Florida (M.B.A.)
- Occupation: Marketing

Chris Hart (born August 11, 1968) is a Republican politician from Florida who served as a member of the Florida House of Representatives from the 57th district from 1998 to 2002.

== Early life ==
Hart was born in Fort Benning, Georgia, in 1968, and moved to Florida in 1970. He graduated from the Florida State University in 1991 with his bachelor's degree in political science, and worked as a legislative aide to State Senator John Grant from 1993 to 1997. Hart then attended the University of South Florida, where he worked as the assistant director of development at the College of Business and graduated with his masters degree in business administration in 1999.

== Florida House of Representatives ==
In 1998, Republican State Representative Faye Culp opted to run for Insurance Commissioner rather than seek re-election. Hart ran to succeed her in the 57th district, which included South Tampa and Town 'n' Country. He faced insurance executive Charlie McKay in the Republican primary, and defeated him in a landslide, receiving 66 percent of the vote to McKay's 34 percent. In the general election, he was opposed by Democratic nominee Mike Suarez, a former aide to U.S. Senator Bob Graham. Hart significantly outraised and outspent Suarez, and ultimately won by a wide margin, winning 57 percent of the vote to Suarez's 43 percent.

Hart ran for re-election in 2000, and won the Republican nomination unopposed. His only opponent in the general election was a write-in candidate, whom he defeated with almost 100 percent of the vote. In 2002, Hart declined to seek a third term, citing his desire to spend more time with his family.

== Post-legislative career ==
After leaving the legislature, Hart worked as the senior vice president of external affairs and investor relations at Enterprise Florida, and was named the CEO of Workforce Florida in 2007. In 2016, Hart returned to Enterprise Florida as the CEO, but resigned three months into the job, citing that he and then-Governor Rick Scott "do not share a common vision or understanding for how Enterprise Florida can best provide value within his administration[.]" In 2017, Hart was named as the chief executive officer of Florida Clerks & Comptrollers, the statewide association of county clerks and comptrollers.
