= Dana Young =

American politician

Dana D. Young
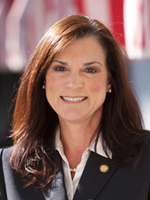

CEO of Visit Florida
- In office January 7, 2019 – February 4, 2025
- Governor: Ron DeSantis
- Preceded by: Ken Lawson

Member of the Florida Senate from the 18th district
- In office November 8, 2016 – November 6, 2018
- Preceded by: Redistricted
- Succeeded by: Janet Cruz

Member of the Florida House of Representatives
- In office November 2, 2010 – November 8, 2016
- Preceded by: Faye Culp
- Succeeded by: Jackie Toledo
- Constituency: 57th district (2010–2012); 60th district (2012–2016)

Personal details
- Born: November 9, 1974 (age 51) Tallahassee, Florida, U.S.
- Party: Republican
- Spouse: Matt Young
- Children: 2
- Relatives: W. Randolph Hodges (Grandfather); Gene Hodges (Uncle)
- Education: Florida State University (BS); University of Virginia School of Law (JD)
- Profession: Attorney

Dana Young (born November 9, 1964) is a Republican politician from Florida and the former CEO of VISIT FLORIDA. She served in the Florida Senate from 2016 to 2018, representing parts of western Hillsborough County. Previously, she served three terms in the Florida House of Representatives from 2010 to 2016.

== History ==
Young was born in Tallahassee into a political family that included her grandfather, W. Randolph Hodges, a former member of the Florida State Senate; her uncle, Gene Hodges, a former State Representative; and her father, Don Duden, a former Assistant Secretary of the Florida Department of Environmental Protection. She attended Florida State University, where she graduated with a Bachelor's degree in 1985, and from the University of Virginia School of Law, where she graduated with her Juris Doctor in 1993. After graduation, she began work as an attorney in private practice, joining Fowler, White, Boggs, P.A., in their Regulated Industries Department.

== Florida Legislature ==
=== House of Representatives ===
In 2010, when incumbent State Representative Faye Culp was unable to run for re-election in the 57th District, based in Hillsborough, due to term limits, Young ran to succeed her in the Republican primary. She faced C. Todd Marks and Dan Molloy, whom she was able to defeat comfortably, winning 55% of the vote. In the general election, Young encountered Stacy Frank, the Democratic nominee. The two sharply disagreed on any number of issues, including the United States embargo against Cuba, which Young supported and Frank opposed; the Patient Protection and Affordable Care Act, which Frank supported and Young opposed; and Florida's ban on gay adoption, which Frank called "unconscionable," but which Young supported, noting, "Regardless of party affiliation, I think that we all agree that the best scenario for a child is to be in a loving family with a mother and father." In the end, Young ended up defeating Frank with 56% of the vote.

When Florida House of Representatives districts were reconfigured in 2012, Young opted to run in the newly created 60th District, which included most of the territory that she had previously represented in the 57th. In both the primary and the general election, she had no opponent, and won her second term entirely uncontested.

Following the resignation of Jennifer Carroll, the Lieutenant Governor of Florida, Young was named by Governor Rick Scott as Carroll's replacement on the Florida Defense Support Task Force, which is "charged with enhancing and protecting Florida's military missions and installations." In this capacity, Young took a strong stance in favor of acquiring land adjacent to MacDill Air Force Base, as it "could be used for residential development incompatible with base operations," which could potentially "threaten MacDill Air Force Base's ranking in the next round of base closures" by the Base Realignment and Closure Commission.

In 2014, Young was re-elected to her third term in the legislature without opposition.

=== Senate ===
Young ran for the Florida Senate in 2016 after court-ordered redistricting created an open seat in western Hillsborough County in 2016. She defeated Democrat Bob Buesing and independent Joe Redner in the general election, 48% to 41% to 10%.

In 2018, Young sought reelection. She was challenged by Democratic state Representative Janet Cruz. Cruz defeated Young by 326 votes.

== Other ==
She is one of the founders of Maggie's List.

== Controversy ==
As the CEO of a taxpayer funded web site promoting Florida tourism, she has been embroiled in a scandal of cancelling LGBTQ from the Visit Florida state tourism web site.

Florida House of Representatives
| Preceded by Faye Culp | Member of the Florida House of Representatives from the 57th district 2010–2012 | Succeeded by Jake Raburn |
| Preceded by Shawn Harrison | Member of the Florida House of Representatives from the 60th district 2012–2016 | Succeeded by Jackie Toledo |
Florida Senate
| Preceded by Wilton Simpson | Member of the Florida Senate from the 18th district 2016–2018 | Succeeded by Janet Cruz |
