= Cedar Key Museum State Park =

Historic house museum in Cedar Key, Florida

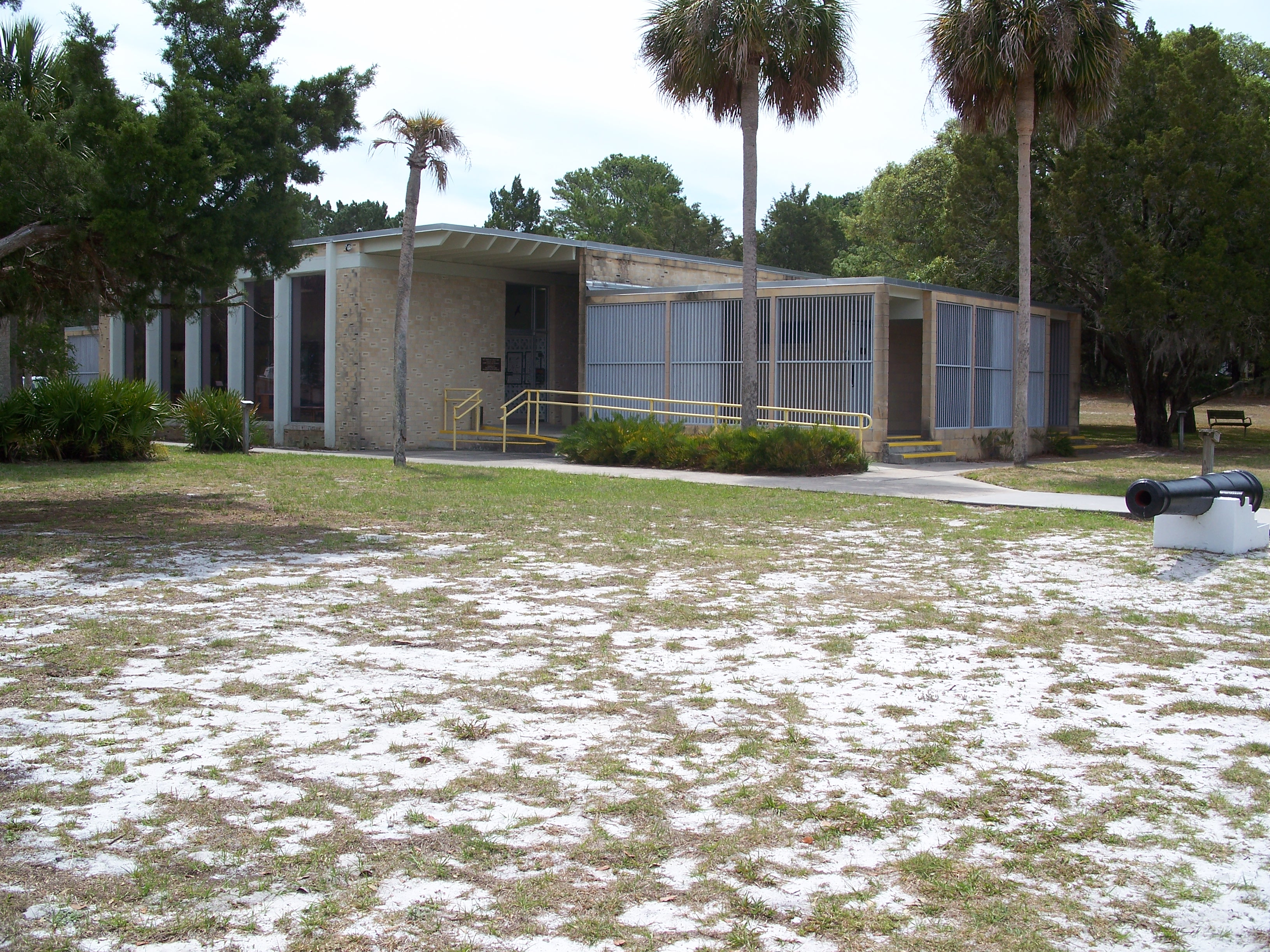
- An image of Cedar Key State Museum

- Location within Florida Location within the United States
- Interactive map of Cedar Key Museum State Park
- Location: Levy County, Florida, United States
- Nearest city: Cedar Key, Florida
- Coordinates: 29.150656149200245°N 83.04800671306464°W
- Governing body: Florida Department of Environmental Protection

Cedar Key State Museum is an 18 acres (7.3 ha) Florida State Park located at 12231 SW 166th Court, Cedar Key, Florida. The museum displays items collected by Saint Clair Whitman, a local resident who established the first museum in his home. His collection included such items as sea shells and Indian artifacts. The museum displays these as well as dioramas depicting life around Cedar Key and contains a large collection of related historical information.

An important feature of the museum is the Saint Clair Whitman house, built in the 1880s and acquired by Whitman in the 1920s. The house has been restored to depict life in Cedar Key c. 1920 - 1930. It was moved to the museum site in 1991 and restored for public viewing. The Memory Walk, a brick trail, links the house to the museum.

In addition to the museum, there is a short nature trail. Among the wildlife of the park are gray squirrels, doves, mockingbirds, blue jays, woodpeckers, and green tree frogs. Native vegetation can be seen on the nature trail as well as on the museum grounds.

== Museum building ==
Charles Kuhn designed the museum building in 1961 in the mid-century modern style. Its exhibits were created by a University of Florida team, with handcrafted dioramas and display text produced using Leroy lettering equipment.

== The Whitman House ==
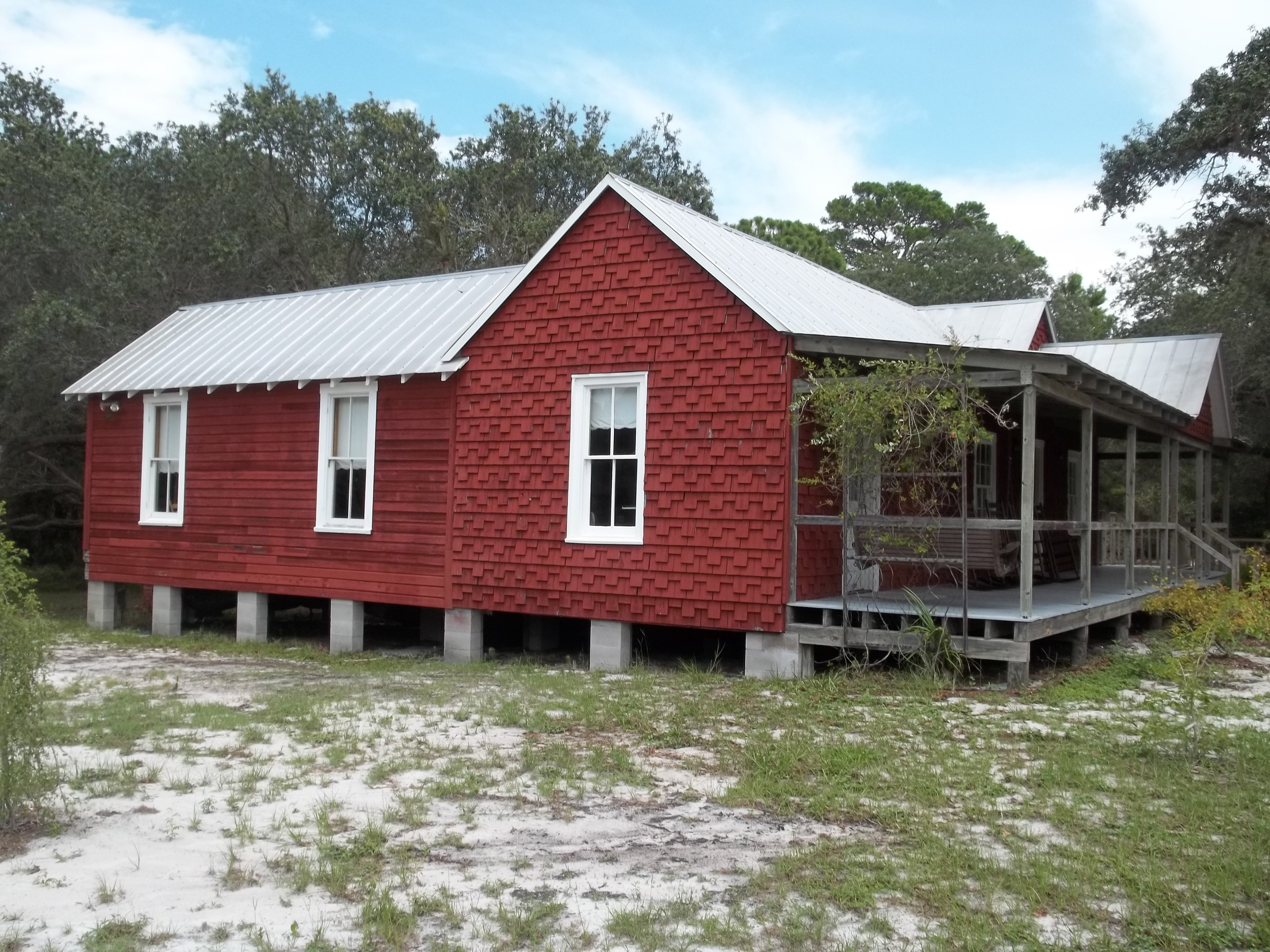

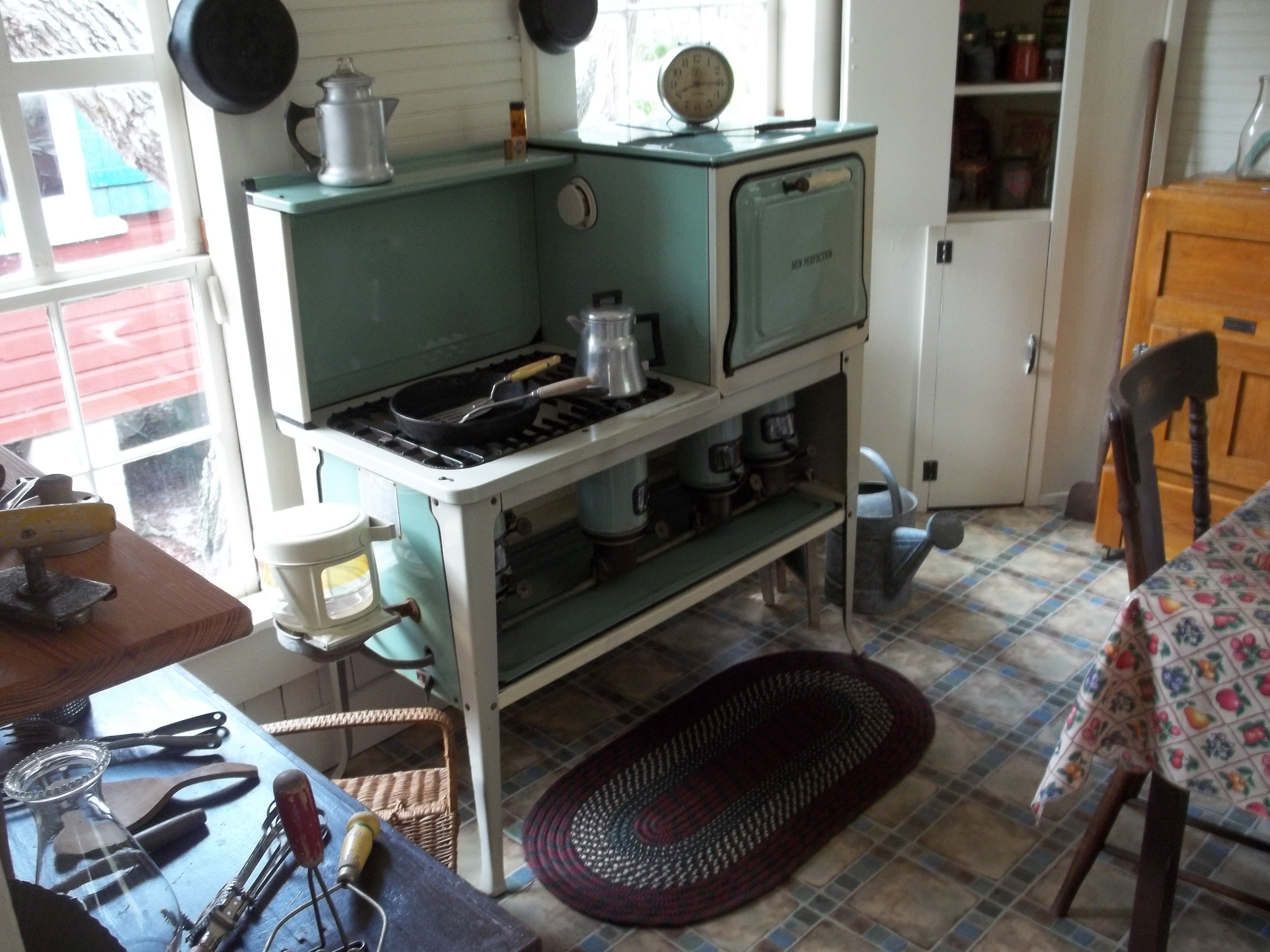

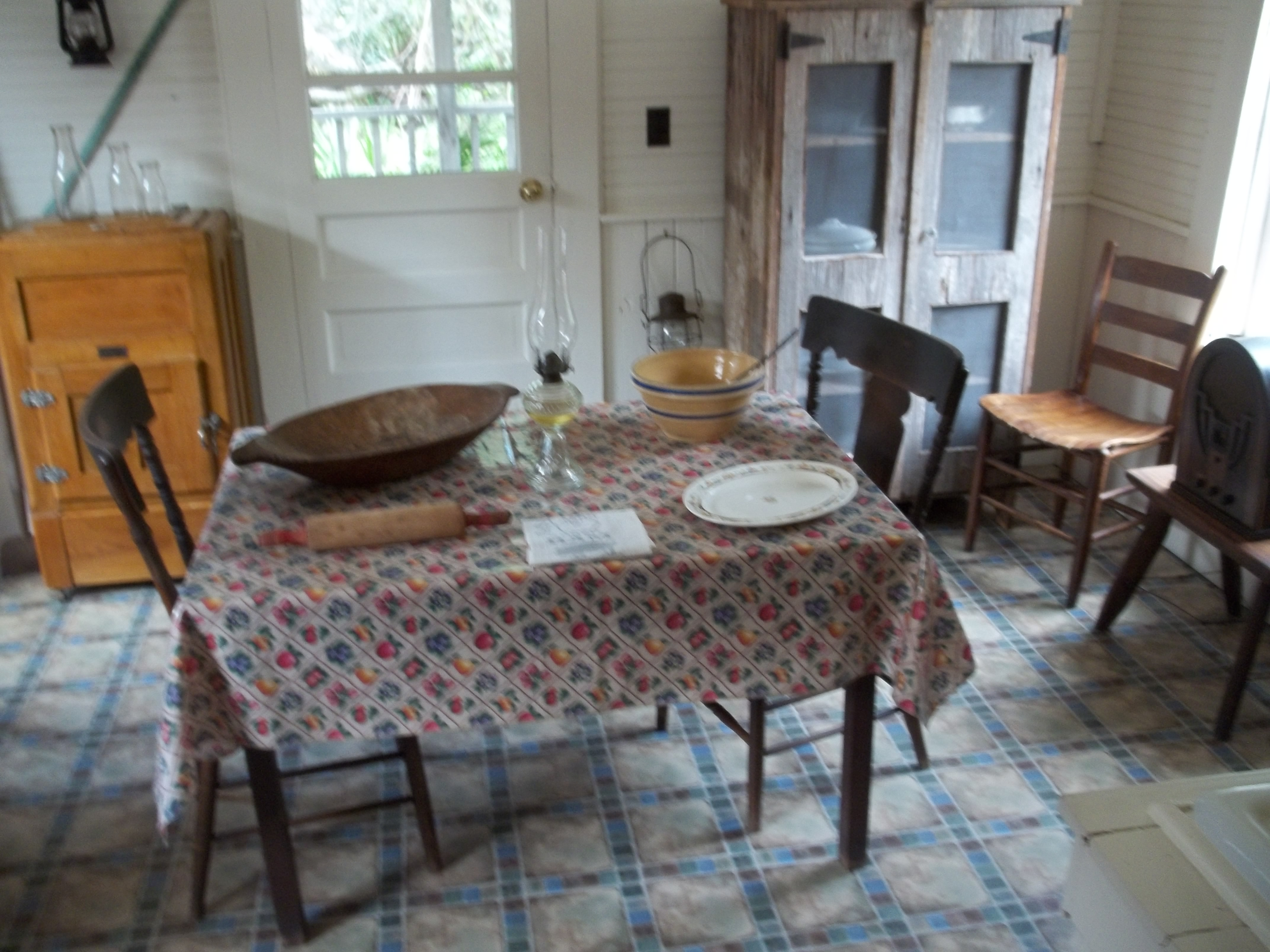

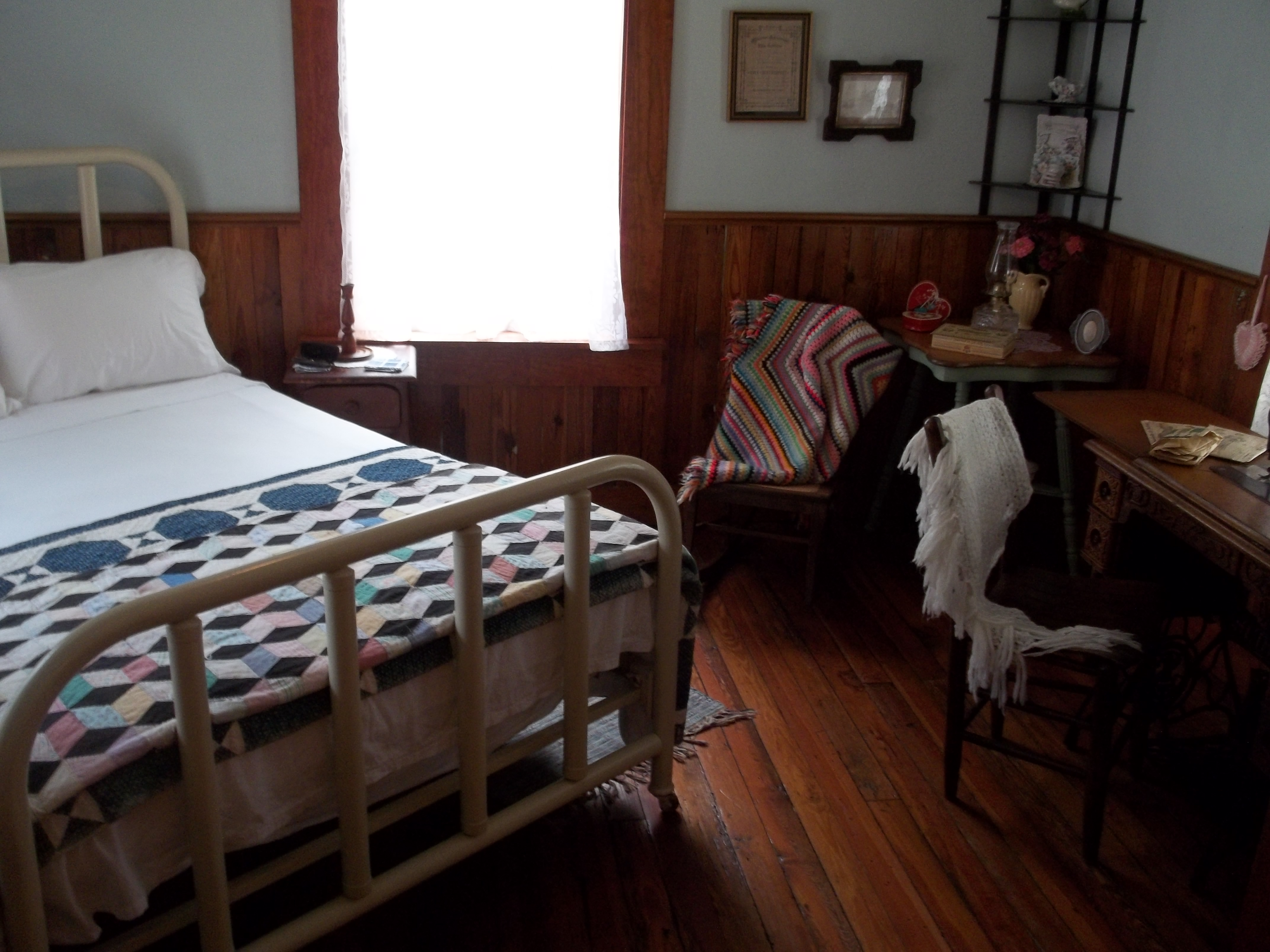

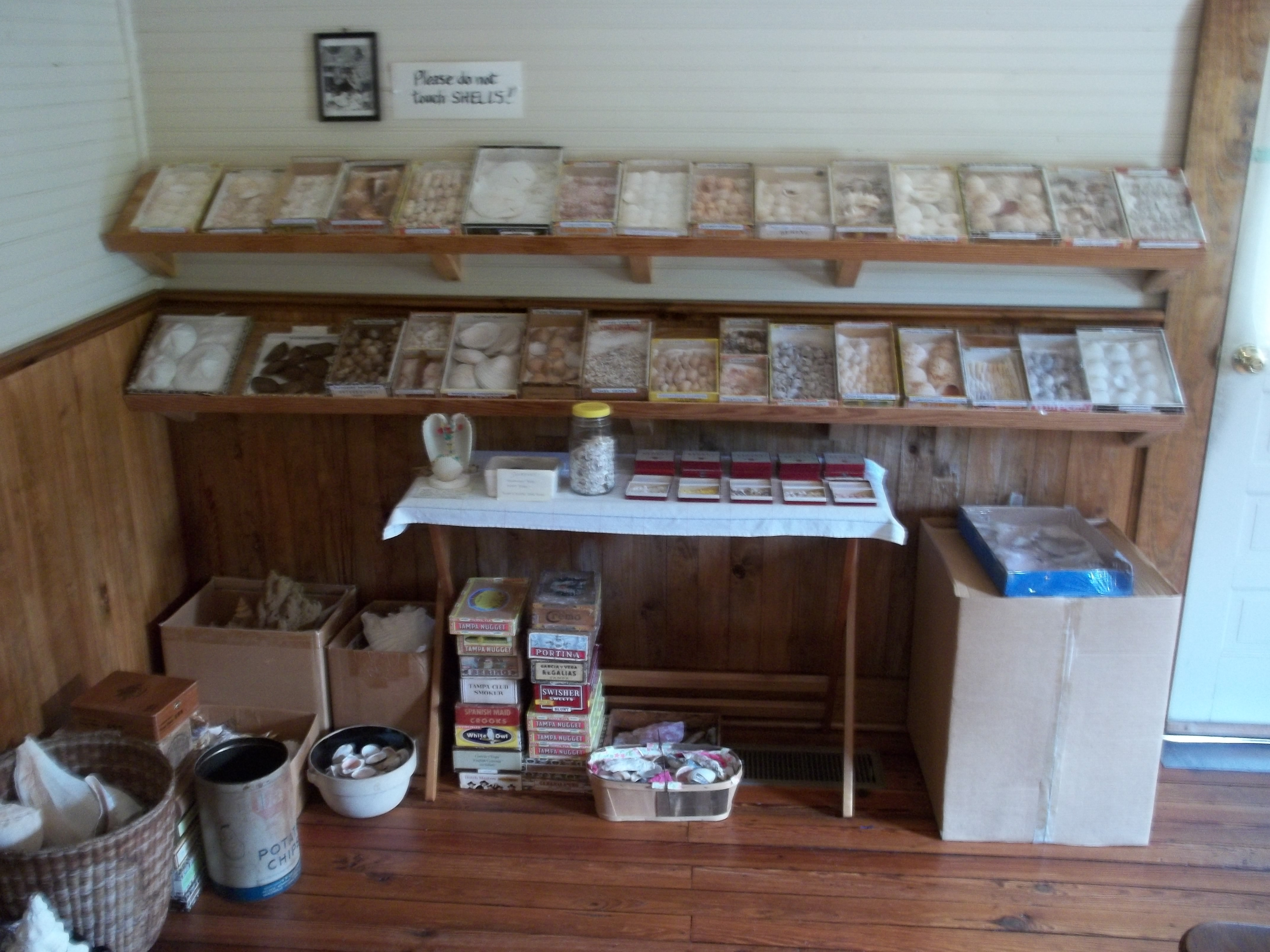

== John Muir ==
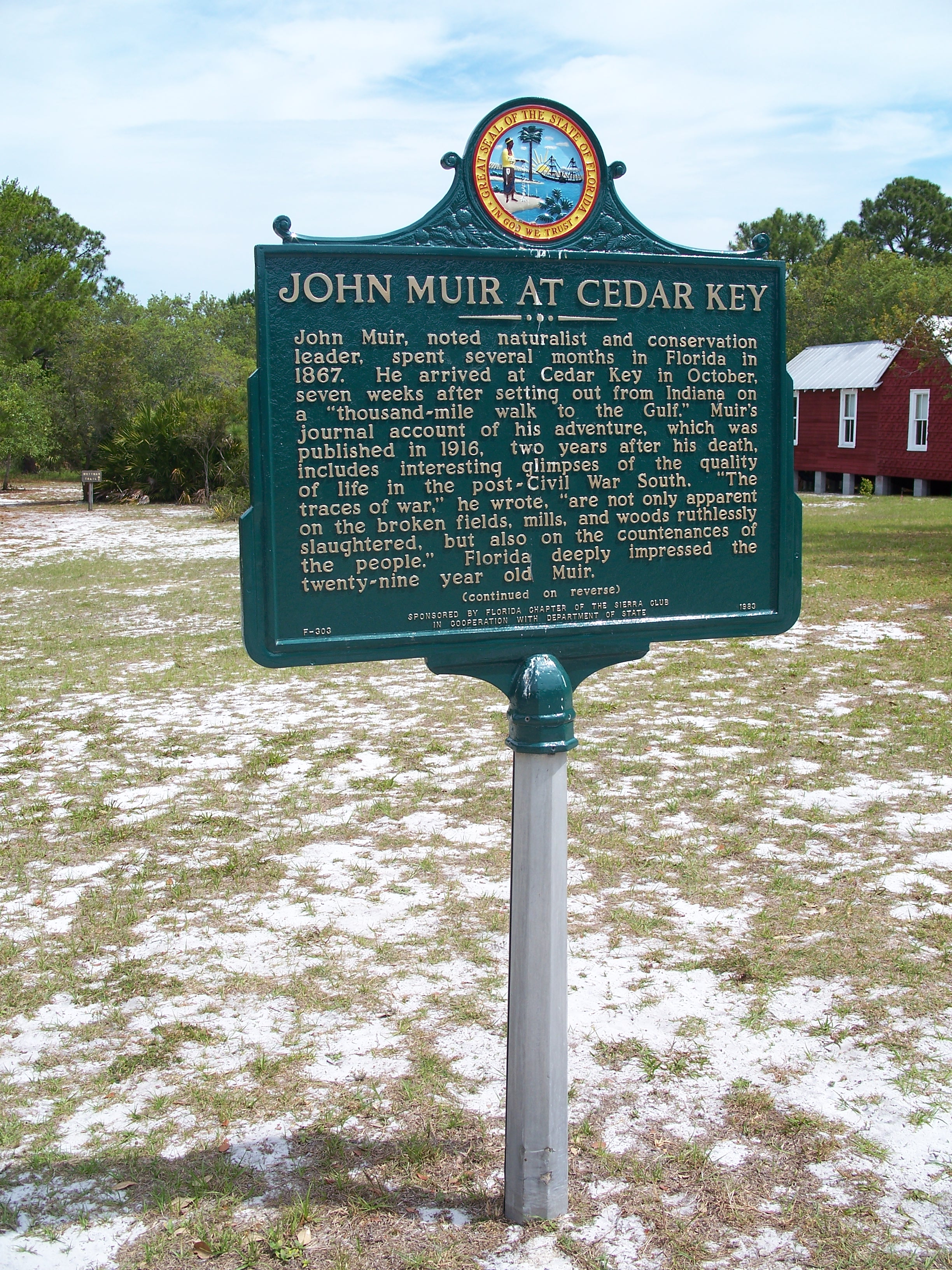
Historic marker commemorating John Muir's visit

The naturalist John Muir visited Cedar Key in 1867 on his historic walk from Kentucky to Florida. He wrote:

For nineteen years my vision was bounded by forests, but today, emerging from a multitude of tropical plants, I beheld the Gulf of Mexico stretching away unbounded, except by the sky. What dreams and speculative matter for thought arose as I stood on the strand, gazing out on the burnished, treeless plain!

The John Muir historic marker was placed on the museum grounds in 1983, commemorating his visit.
