= W. Randolph Hodges =

American politician

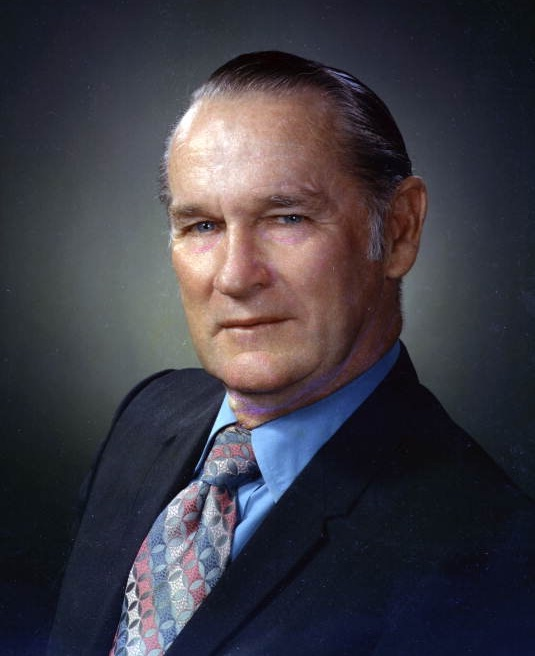

Member of the Florida Senate from the 21st district
- In office 1953–1961
- Preceded by: John Min Ayers
- Succeeded by: Etter Thomas Usher Jr.

President of the Florida Senate
- In office 1961

Personal details
- Born: William Randolph Hodges; February 5, 1914 Cedar Key, Florida, U.S.
- Died: November 20, 2005 (aged 91) Cedar Key, Florida, U.S.
- Party: Democratic
- Spouse: Mildred Mae Yearty
- Children: Gene, Nancy, Hal
- Occupation: Commercial fisherman

William Randolph Hodges, Jr., often styled as W. Randolph Hodges, (February 5, 1914 – November 20, 2005) was a Florida politician and Democrat who most notably served as the President of the Florida State Senate.

== Background ==
Born in Cedar Key, Florida, Randolph Hodges lived most of his life in the home his father had built around the turn of the century. He graduated from Cedar Key High School in 1932 and attended the University of Florida for a short time before returning to his native island city. Hodges married Mildred Yearty from Otter Creek, Florida in November 1933 and began a relationship that would last 72 years, producing 3 children: Eugene Randolph, Nancy Patricia, and William Hal.

Like most Cedar Key residents during the early 20th century, Hodges was a commercial fisherman and for a while operated a fish house. He bought the local ice plant during the 1940s and manufactured ice for fishermen for approximately 18 years. In connection with the ice plant, he owned and operated an appliance and marine store.

== Political life ==
Hodges began his political career by serving 2 terms as mayor of Cedar Key and 10 years as a Levy County Commissioner. He was elected to the Florida State Senate (representing Levy, Gilchrist, and Dixie Counties) in 1952 and served for 3 terms (12 years), during which time he served as President pro tempore in 1959, and President of the Florida Senate in the 1961 legislature. He was a solid member of the Senate bloc of small county senators known as the Pork Chop Gang, which fought against issues such as reapportionment and engaged in McCarthyist tactics. Following the 1961 legislative session, Governor Farris Bryant and the Florida Cabinet appointed Hodges to serve as State Conservation Director. He, Mildred, and their son Hal moved to Tallahassee and lived there for thirteen years, during which time he served as Conservation Director and Director of the newly established Department of Natural Resources.

Randolph retired from state government in 1974 and he and Mildred returned to their family home in Cedar Key, where he remained until his death. He raised cattle on his Rosewood farm on the mainland and represented Pompano Park Harness Race Track as a lobbyist in Tallahassee for many years. His son was Gene Hodges who served in the Florida House of Representatives and his granddaughter Dana Young served as the Majority Leader of the Florida House of Representatives, representing parts of Hillsborough County.
