= Jackie Toledo =

American politician (born 1976)

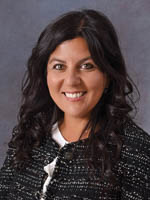

Member of the Florida House of Representatives from the 60th district
- In office November 8, 2016 – November 8, 2022
- Preceded by: Dana Young
- Succeeded by: Lindsay Cross

Personal details
- Born: July 18, 1976 (age 50) Lima, Peru
- Party: Republican
- Children: 5
- Education: University of South Florida (BS)

Jackie Toledo is an American politician and civil engineer who served as a member of the Florida House of Representatives for the 60th district from 2016 to 2022. She is a member of the Florida Republican Party.

== Early life and education ==
Toledo was born in Lima and immigrated to the United States as a child. She graduated from Gaither High School in Tampa, Florida and the University of South Florida.

== Career ==
Toledo is a civil engineer with NUE Urban Concepts. She served as the deputy majority whip of the Florida House during her first term. She also served as the chair of the Women's Caucus.

=== 2015 ===
Toledo unsuccessfully ran for Tampa City Council against Guido Maniscalco in 2015, winning 49% of the vote. Many credit her loss to "a barrage of nasty attack ads against Maniscalco flooded area mailboxes."

=== 2016 ===
In 2016, Toledo won the Republican primary for the 60th district, defeating businesswoman Rebecca Smith by 246 votes (1.96%). She went on to win the general election against Democratic opponent, land use attorney David Singer, with 57% of the vote. Among the primary platform points of Toledo's 2016 campaign were that she was supported by the NRA and she would repeal in-state tuition and law licenses for "illegal aliens.”

=== 2018 ===
Toledo won reelection in 2018 with 52.24% of the vote.

=== 2020 ===
Toledo faced a Democratic opponent, Julie Jenkins, in her 2020 campaign for reelection.

== Political positions ==
=== Abortion and birth control ===
In 2017, Toledo introduced a bill to the Florida House of Representatives to "promote and encourage childbirth," by funding anti-abortion organizations. The bill directed state funds to Florida Pregnancy Care Network, Inc., an organization that explicitly does not make referrals to abortion providers, with the funds earmarked to support direct client services, promotional campaigns, and a call center. The bill restricted Florida Pregnancy Care Network to only subcontracting with "providers that exclusively promote and support childbirth". Opponents to the bill objected that it would block the state from awarding contracts to organizations that provide information on birth control and abortion services. Other concerns with the bill included that it was duplicative of the Healthy Start program; it spent money with an organization offering referrals rather than healthcare; and, though the bill blocked providers from discussing religion, provided the funds to an organization with a religious agenda.

=== Education ===
In 2018, Toledo supported a bill that created a new class of charter schools.

In 2018, Toledo received an "F" rating from the Florida Education Association.

=== Electric and hybrid vehicles ===
In 2020, Toledo introduced a bill that would have increased the license tax for electric and hybrid vehicles to be the same as all other vehicles and would add an additional $150–250 fee for electric vehicles and $50 for hybrid vehicles, on top of the regular tax amounts, with those fees set to increase every five years.

=== Gun control ===
In Toledo's 2016 campaign, she received an "A" rating from the NRA. In 2018, her rating dropped to a "C" for supporting legislation, following the Stoneman Douglas High School shooting that raised the age to purchase of a rifle from 18 to 21 and put armed officers in schools. In 2018, Toledo voted against banning semiautomatic rifles.

Toledo supported Florida's Stand-your-ground law, calling "a tool to help people protect themselves."

=== Immigration ===
In her 2016 campaign, Toledo promised to repeal in-state tuition and law licenses for "illegal aliens.” However, when a bill was introduced in 2018 to repeal in-state tuition for undocumented immigrants, Toledo was not a sponsor and never publicly commented on it.

=== Medicaid ===
Toledo opposed Florida taking federal money to expand Medicaid.

=== Voting rights ===
Toledo supported 2019 legislation restricting voting rights to individuals who have received a felony to those who paid all fines and fees resulting from the sentence or probation. The bill was associated with the 2018 Florida constitutional amendments voters passed to restore the voting rights of individuals who received felonies.

== Personal life ==
Toledo had five children with José Angel Toledo, who she divorced in October 2019. In October 2019, José Angel Toledo was disbarred for abandoning his law practice and withholding settlement money from clients. It is suspected that José Angel Toledo fled the country.
