= Maggie's List =

American political action committee

- Founded: 2010
- Founder: Jennifer Carroll; Faye Culp; Denise Grimsley; Gayle Harrell; Lynn Jenkins; Sandra Mortham; Jeanette Núñez; Kathleen Passidomo; Ginny Brown-Waite; Dana Young
- Type: Federal Political Action Committee
- Purpose: Electing conservative women to Congress
- Location: Tallahassee, Florida
- Region served: United States
- Key people: Sandra Mortham (Chairwoman); Sue Lowden (Vice Chairwoman); Chele Farley (National Finance Chairwoman); Annette Meeks (Secretary)
- Website: http://maggieslist.org/

Maggie's List is a United States federal political action committee founded in Florida in 2010 to "raise awareness and funds to increase the number of conservative women elected to federal public office". It is named after Margaret Chase Smith, a Republican who was the first woman elected to both houses of Congress (elected to the House in 1940, and the Senate in 1948). Smith was also the first woman to run for President in a major party primary. Maggie's List first raised money and made donations to candidates in the 2010 elections.

== See also ==
- EMILYs List, similar organization to help Democratic women in favor of abortion rights get elected
- National Federation of Republican Women – similar organization serving as the women's wing of the Republican Party
- Susan B. Anthony Pro-Life America – advocating for pro-life women as candidates
