= Gene Hodges =

American politician (1936–2014)

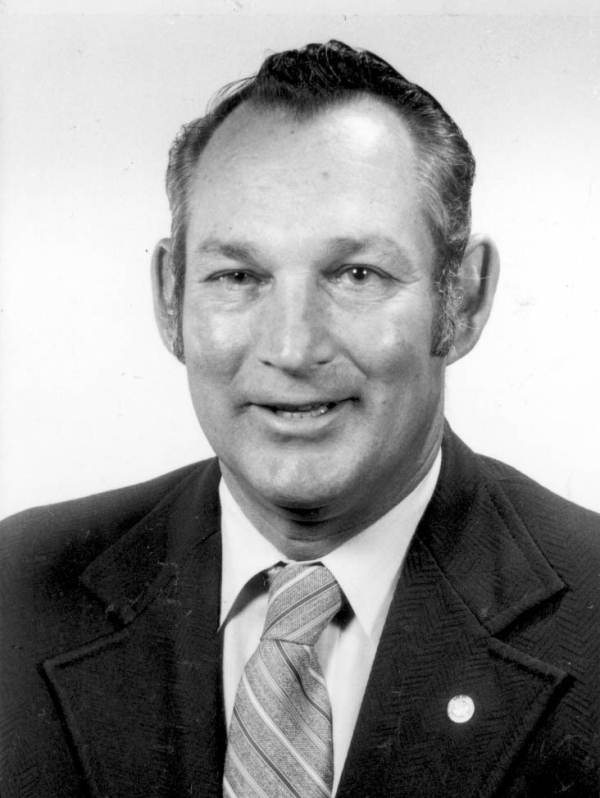
- Hodges in 1982

Member of the Florida House of Representatives from the 14th district
- In office November 7, 1972 – November 2, 1982
- Preceded by: Jack Burke Jr.
- Succeeded by: Carl Ogden

Member of the Florida House of Representatives from the 11th district
- In office November 2, 1982 – November 22, 1988
- Preceded by: Don C. Price
- Succeeded by: Allen Boyd

Personal details
- Born: November 23, 1936 Cedar Key, Florida
- Died: July 6, 2014 (aged 77)
- Party: Democratic
- Parent: W. Randolph Hodges (father)
- Relatives: Dana Young (niece)

Eugene Randolph Hodges, styled as Gene Hodges, (November 23, 1936 – July 6, 2014) was an American politician in the state of Florida, serving in the state House of Representatives from 1972 to 1988.

== Biography ==
Born in Cedar Key, Florida, Hodges served in the United States Air Force 1955 to 1958. He served in the Florida House of Representatives as a Democrat from the 14th district from November 7, 1972, and the 11th district from November 7, 1982, to November 8, 1988.

Hodges also served on the Cedar Key City Council.

=== Family ===
His father W. Randolph Hodges served in the Florida State Senate and his niece Dana Young also served in the Florida House of Representatives.

=== Death ===
He died in 2014 of a heart attack in Cedar Key, Florida.
