= Island Hotel =

Historic hotel in Cedar Key, Florida, US

- U.S. National Register of Historic Places
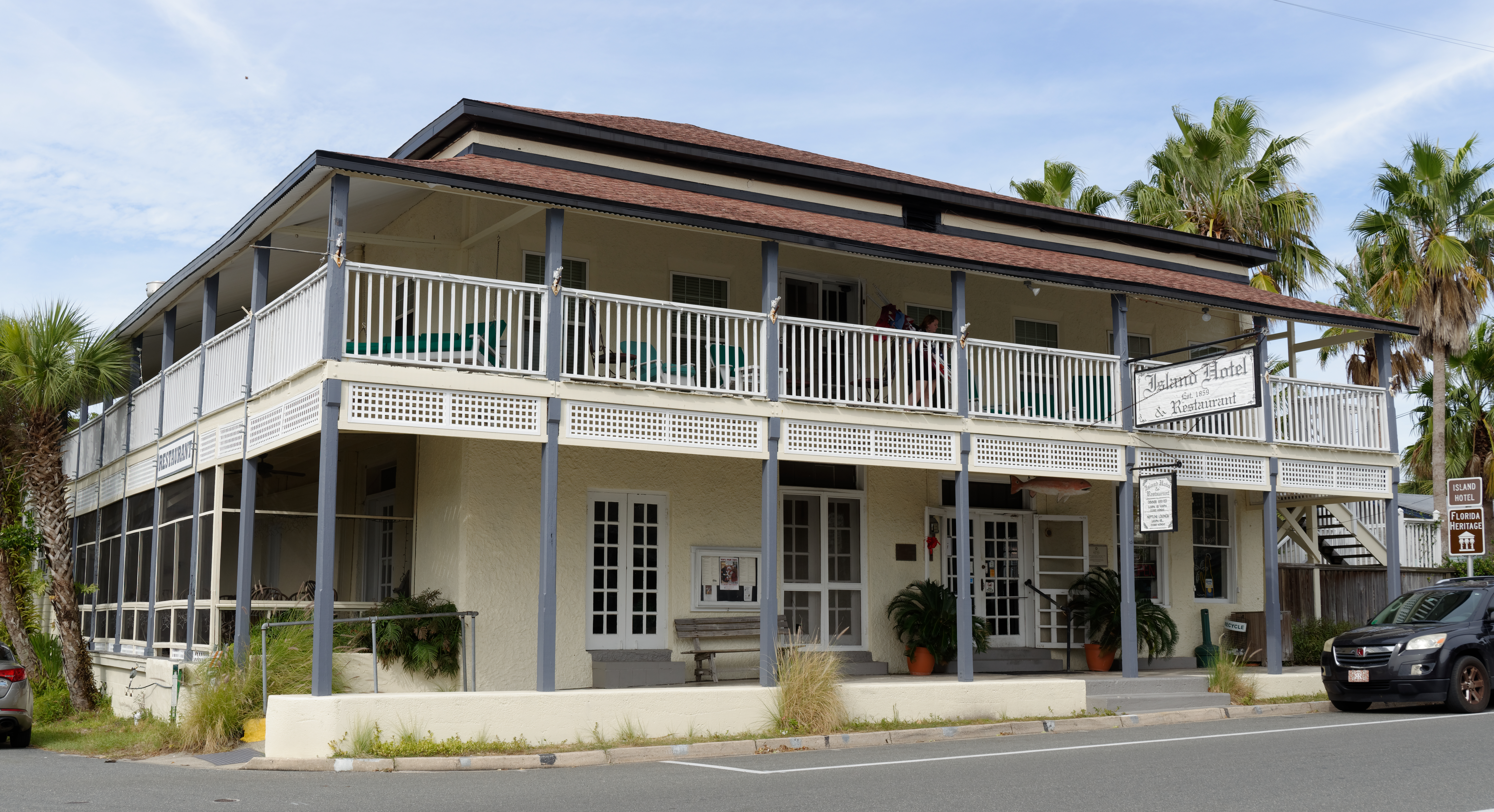

- Location within Florida Location within the United States
- Location: Cedar Key, Florida
- Coordinates: 29.13713°N 83.03124°W
- Built: 1861
- Architectural style: Masonry Vernacular
- NRHP reference No.: 84000252
- Added to NRHP: November 23, 1984

The Island Hotel (also known as Parsons and Hale's General Store) is a historic building in Cedar Key, Florida, located at 224 2nd Street. On November 23, 1984, it was added to the U.S. National Register of Historic Places.

The building was erected between 1859 and 1861 by Major John Parsons and Francis E. Hale for use as a general store. It has tabby walls that are 10 inches (250 mm) thick and oak beams that are 12 inches (300 mm) wide. The Cedar Key Post Office and customs house were also located in the building in the 1860s. The building may have housed both Union and Confederate troops at various times during the Civil War, as the town changed hands more than once. Part of the building was used as a boarding house by the end of the 1880s. The store closed in 1910. The building became a hotel in 1946.
