= Cedar Key, Florida =

- City
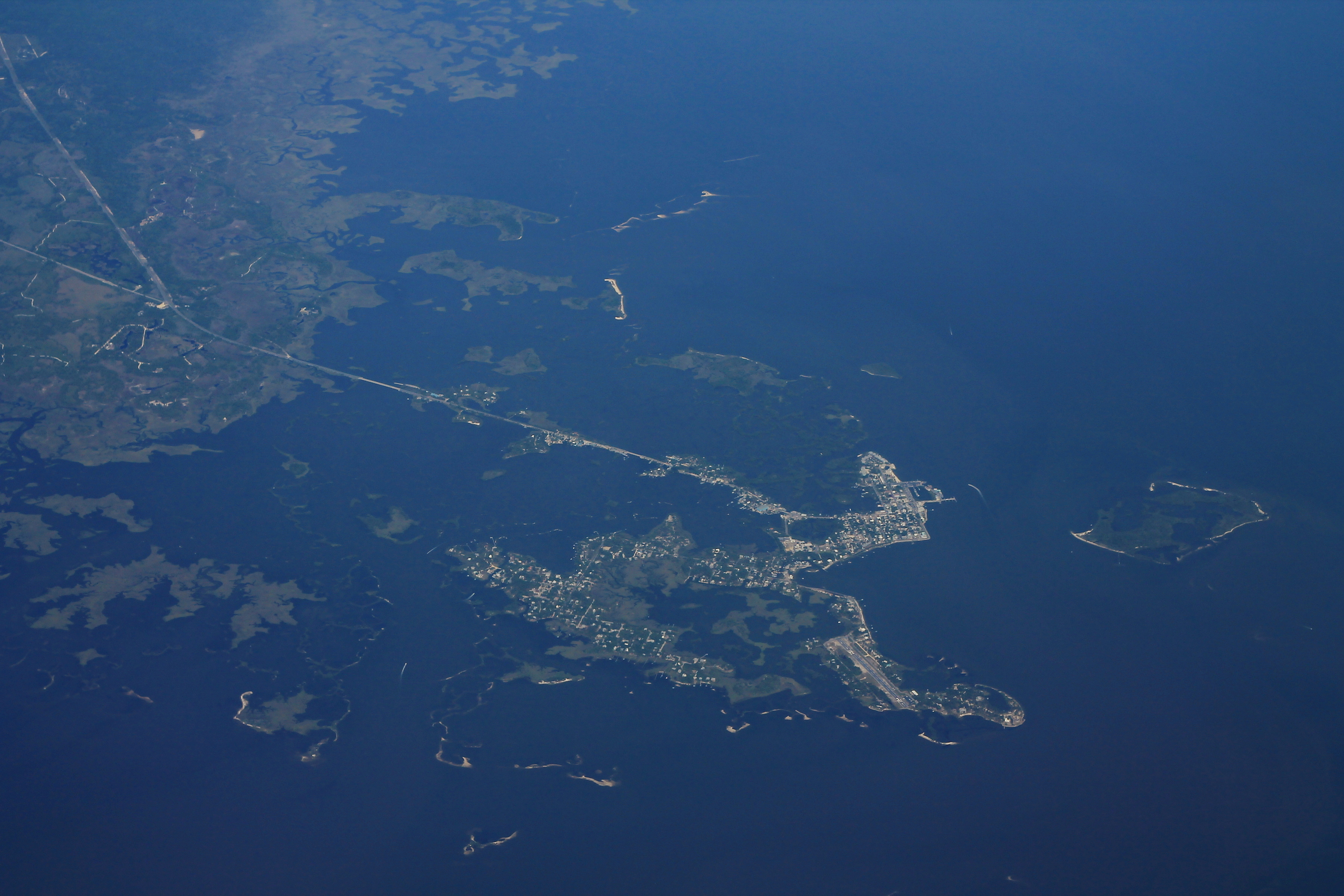
- Aerial view of Cedar Key and its outlying islands, illustrating the extremely small size of the city: The fork at State Road 24 and County Road 347 (the only two access roads) can be seen in the upper left.

- Seal

- Location in Levy County, Florida
- Coordinates: 29°08′43″N 83°02′20″W
- Country: United States
- State: Florida
- County: Levy
- Settled: 1840–1858
- Incorporated (City of Astena Otie): 1859
- Incorporated (Town of Cedar Keys): 1869
- Incorporated (City of Cedar Key): 1923

Government
  - Type: Mayor-Commission
  - Mayor: Jeff Webb
  - Vice Mayor: Jim Wortham
  - Commissioners: Mel Beckham, Jolie Davis, and Nancy Sera
  - City Clerk: Laura Jean Roberts
  - City Attorney: Norm D. Fugate

Area
  - Total: 2.17 sq mi (5.63 km^{2})
  - Land: 1.01 sq mi (2.62 km^{2})
  - Water: 1.16 sq mi (3.01 km^{2})
- Elevation: 0 ft (0 m)

Population (2020)
  - Total: 687
  - Density: 680.3/sq mi (262.65/km^{2})
- Time zone: UTC-5 (Eastern (EST))
  - Summer (DST): UTC-4 (EDT)
- ZIP code: 32625
- Area code: 352
- FIPS code: 12-11225
- GNIS ID: 2404014
- Website: cityofcedarkey.org

Cedar Key is a city in Levy County, Florida, United States. As of the 2020 census, its population was 687, down from 702 at the 2010 census. It is part of the Gainesville, Florida Metropolitan Statistical Area. The Cedar Keys are a cluster of islands near the mainland. Most of the developed area for the city of Cedar Key has been on Way Key since the end of the 19th century. The Cedar Keys are named for the eastern red cedar Juniperus virginiana, once abundant in the area.

The city was impacted by Hurricane Helene on September 26, 2024, which caused a 10-foot storm surge that broke the record set during Hurricane Idalia in August 2023.

== History ==
=== Early ===
While evidence suggests human occupation as far back as 500 BC, the first maps of the area date to 1542, when a cartographer from Spain labeled it "Las Islas Sabines" (which means "The Cedar Islands" in Spanish). An archaeological dig at Shell Mound, 9 miles (14 km) north of Cedar Key, found artifacts dating back to 500 BC in the top 10 feet (3.0 m) of the 28-foot-tall (8.5 m) mound. The only ancient burial found in Cedar Key was a 2,000-year-old skeleton found in 1999. Arrow heads and spear points dating from the Paleo period (12,000 years old) were collected by Cedar Key historian St. Clair Whitman, and are displayed at the Cedar Key Museum State Park.

Followers of William Augustus Bowles, self-declared "Director General of the State of Muskogee", built a watchtower in the vicinity of Cedar Key in 1801. The tower was destroyed by a Spanish force in 1802. In the period leading up to the First Seminole War, the British subjects Alexander Arbuthnot and Robert Ambrister used the Cedar Keys to deliver supplies to the Seminoles. The Cedar Keys may have been a refuge for escaped slaves in the early 1820s, and an entry point for the illegal slave trade later that decade.

=== Indian War ===
During the Second Seminole War, the United States Army established Fort No. 4 on the mainland adjacent to the Cedar Keys. (The name "No. 4" was later applied to a boat channel next to the fort, and then to a railroad trestle and a highway bridge over that channel.) In 1840, General Zachary Taylor requested the Cedar Keys be reserved for military use for the duration of the war, and that Seahorse Key be permanently reserved for a lighthouse. In 1840, General Walker Keith Armistead, who had succeeded Zachary Taylor as commander of United States troops in the war, ordered construction of a hospital on what had become known as Depot Key. (The island's name may reflect the establishment of a depot there by Florida militia general Leigh Read. The primary depot for the U.S. Army in Florida at the time was at Palatka, Florida.) Depot Key was the headquarters for the Army in Florida, but Fishburne states headquarters was not in a fixed place, but wherever the commander was.

Cantonment Morgan was established on nearby Seahorse Key by 1841 and used as a troop deployment station and as a holding station for Seminoles who had been captured or who had surrendered until they could be sent to the West. A hurricane with a 27-foot (8.2 m) storm surge struck the Cedar Keys on October 4, 1842, destroying Cantonment Morgan and causing much damage on Depot Key. Some Seminole leaders had been meeting with Army officers at Depot Key to negotiate their surrender or a retreat to a reservation in the Everglades. After the hurricane, the Seminoles refused to return to the area. Colonel William J. Worth had declared the war to be over in August 1842, and Depot Key was abandoned by the Army after the hurricane.

=== Pre-Civil War ===
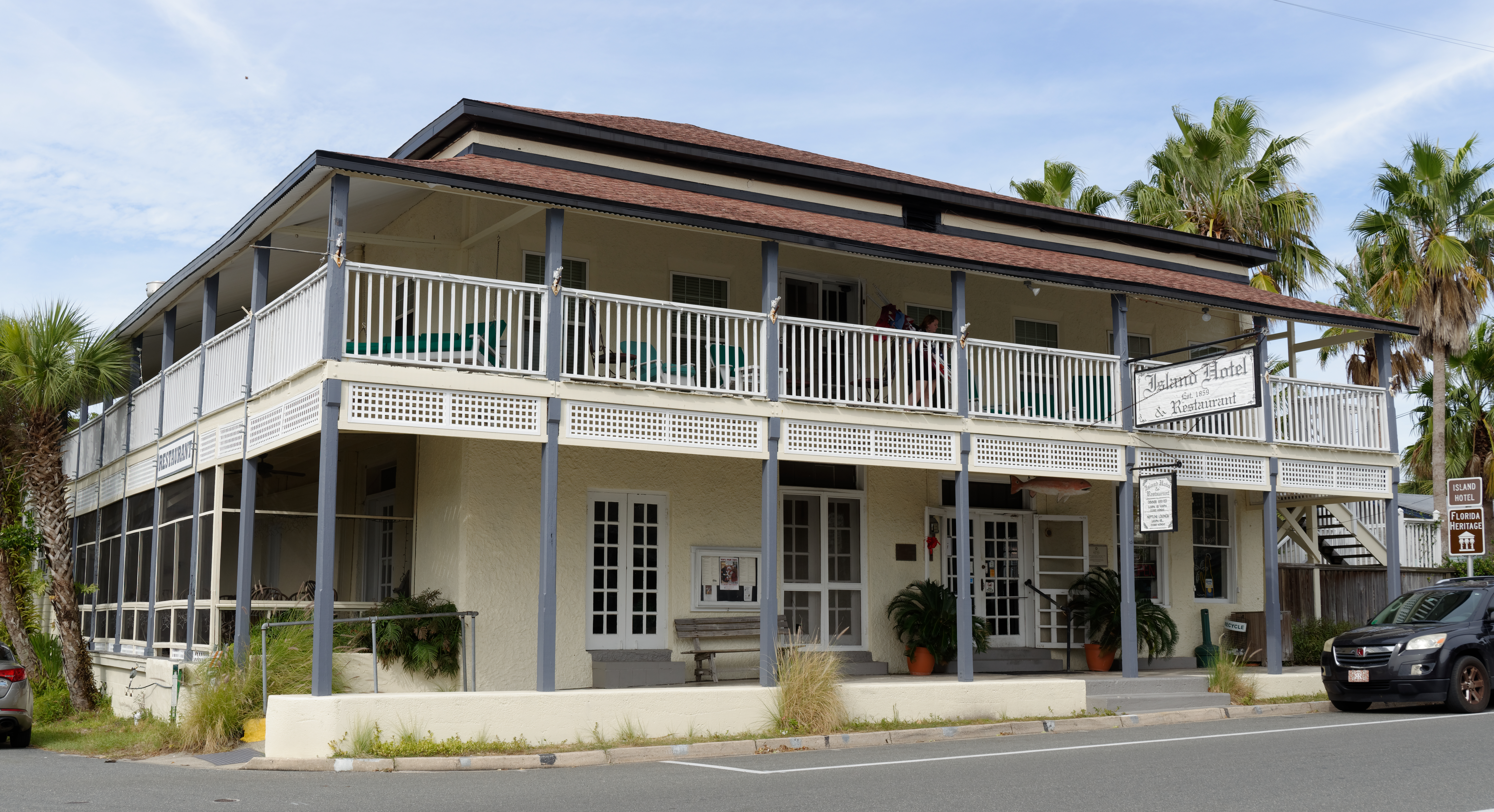
Island Hotel

In 1842, the United States Congress had enacted the Armed Occupation Act, a precursor of the Homestead Act, to increase white settlement in Florida as a way to force the Seminoles to leave the territory. With the abandonment of the Army base on Depot Key, the Cedar Keys became available for settlement under the act. Under the terms of the act, several people received permits for settlement on Depot Key, Way Key, and Scale Key. Augustus Steele, US Customs House Officer for Hillsborough County, Florida, and postmaster for the Tampa Bay area, received the permit for Depot Key, which he renamed Atsena Otie Key. In 1843, he bought the buildings on the island, and built some cottages for wealthy guests. In 1844, he became the Collector of Customs for the port of Cedar Key, as well as for Tampa, Florida. A post office named "Cedar Key" was established on Atsena Otie Key in 1845. The Florida legislature chartered the "City of Atsena Otie" in 1859.

Cedar Key became an important port, shipping lumber and naval stores harvested on the mainland. By 1860, two mills on Atsena Otie Key were producing "cedar" slats for shipment to northern pencil factories. As a result of the growth, the US Congress appropriated funds for a lighthouse on Seahorse Key in 1850. The Cedar Key Light was completed in 1854. The lighthouse lantern is 28 feet (8.5 m) above the ground, but the lighthouse sits on a 47-foot-high (14 m) hill, putting the light 75 feet (23 m) above sea level. The light was visible for 16 miles (26 km). Wood-frame residences were added to each side of the lighthouse several years later.

In 1860, Cedar Key became the western terminus of the Florida Railroad, connecting it to Fernandina Beach, Florida on the east coast of Florida. David Levy Yulee, U.S. senator and president of the Florida Railroad, had acquired most of Way Key to house the railroad's terminal facilities. A town was platted on Way Key in 1859, and Parsons and Hale's General Store, which is now the Island Hotel, was built there in the same year. On March 1, 1861, the first train arrived in Cedar Key, just weeks before the Civil War began.

Starting in 1858, Eberhard Faber, the Eagle Pencil Company, and other companies built mills on Way Key and Atsena Otie Key to mill pencil slats (boards to be shaped into encasements for pencils) which were then shipped to northern factories to be made into pencils.

=== Civil War era ===
With the advent of the American Civil War in 1861, Confederate agents extinguished the light at Seahorse Key and removed its supply of sperm whale oil. The defense of Cedar Key was assigned to the Columbia and New River Rifles, two companies of the 4th Florida Infantry Regiment, under the command of Lt. Colonel M. Whit Smith. On July 3, 1861, four Federal war prize schooners appeared off Cedar Key. The schooners, originally captured by the USS Massachusetts off New Orleans, were under the command of U. S. Navy Lieutenant George L. Selden, nephew of former Treasurer of the United States William Selden, and manned by nineteen sailors. Col. Smith led his two rifle companies along with one six-pounder cannon twenty miles offshore on the steamer Madison and captured the schooners after firing two warning shots. With the recovery, Col. Smith and his men liberated fifteen Confederate sailors, recovered the vessels' valuable cargo of railroad iron and turpentine and effected the first capture of a U. S. Naval officer at sea during the war.

The USS Hatteras raided Cedar Key in January 1862, burning several ships loaded with cotton and turpentine and destroying the railroad's rolling stock and buildings on Way Key. Most of the Confederate troops guarding Cedar Key had been sent to Fernandina in anticipation of a Federal attack there. Cedar Key was an important source of salt for the Confederacy during the early part of the war. In October 1862, a Union raid destroyed sixty kettles on Salt Key capable of producing 150 bushels of salt a day. The Union occupied the Cedar Keys in early 1864, staying for the remainder of the war.

=== Post-Civil War ===
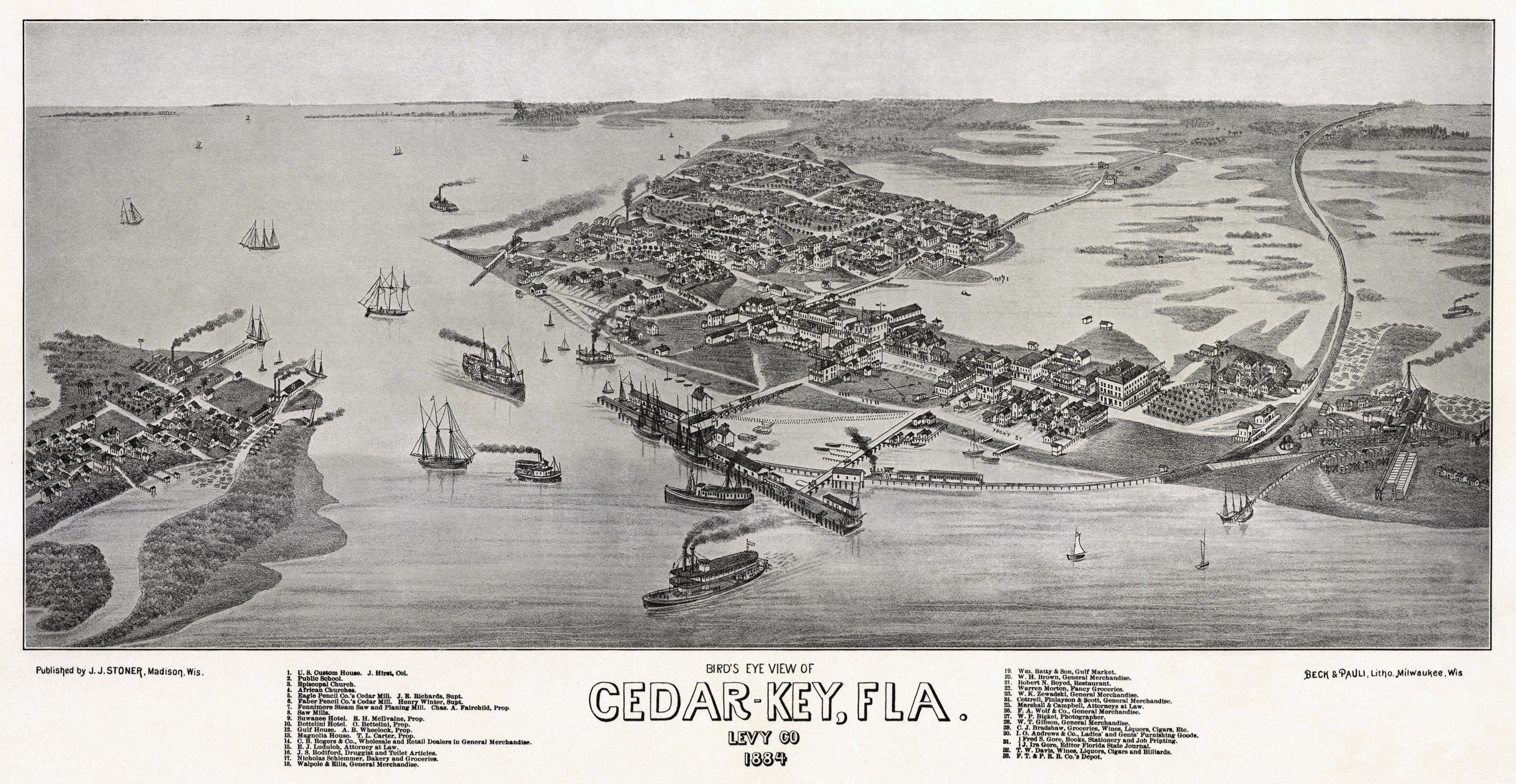
1884 map of Cedar Key

Early in his career as a naturalist, John Muir walked 1,000 miles (1,600 km) from Louisville, Kentucky, to Cedar Key in just two months in 1867. Muir contracted malaria while working in a sawmill in Cedar Key, and recovered in the house of the mill's superintendent. Muir recovered enough to sail from Cedar Key to Cuba in January 1868. He recorded his impressions of Cedar Key in his memoir A Thousand-Mile Walk to the Gulf, published in 1916, after his death.

The Florida Railroad was repaired after the war and shipping resumed between Cedar Key and Fernandina on the east coast of Florida. The town of Cedar Keys was incorporated in 1869, and had a population of 400 in 1870. The railroad experienced heavy traffic through the 1870s and early 1880s, carrying pencil slats, turpentine, palm fiber and brushes, oysters, fish, turtles, fruits, vegetables, cotton, sugar, and passengers to Fernandina to be loaded on ships to northern cities. African-Americans formed a substantial portion of the population in Cedar Key in the 1870s, including 32 of the 61 registered voters in the town in 1873, with two Blacks elected as town councilmen. The next year Blacks made up 62% of the registered voters, and elected Blacks as the mayor, three councilmen, and the town marshall. Federal troops were withdrawn from Florida in 1877, ending the last vestige of the Reconstruction era. That year Whites outnumbered Blacks as registered voters (111 to 90) and no Blacks were elected to municipal office. Two blacks were elected to the town council in 1877.

=== Decline and restoration of wildlife ===
When Henry Plant's railroad to Tampa began service in 1886, Tampa took shipping away from Cedar Key, causing an economic decline in the area. Earlier, growth in population had led to the Cedar Key town limits being expanded in 1881 and again in 1884. But with the decline in the local economy, the town limits were contracted in 1890. Also in 1890, the island town was affected by the reign of terror of Cedar Keys mayor William Cottrell, who took advantage of his Florida state legislature connections and the restricted one-way road access to impose his will and conduct acts of violence. He was deposed from power only after the island was invaded by a naval (U.S. Coast Guard) boat manned with a squad of U.S. Marshals, who were sent there after Custom House officers and other federal government workers requested federal aid due to being unable to discharge their duties on the islands.

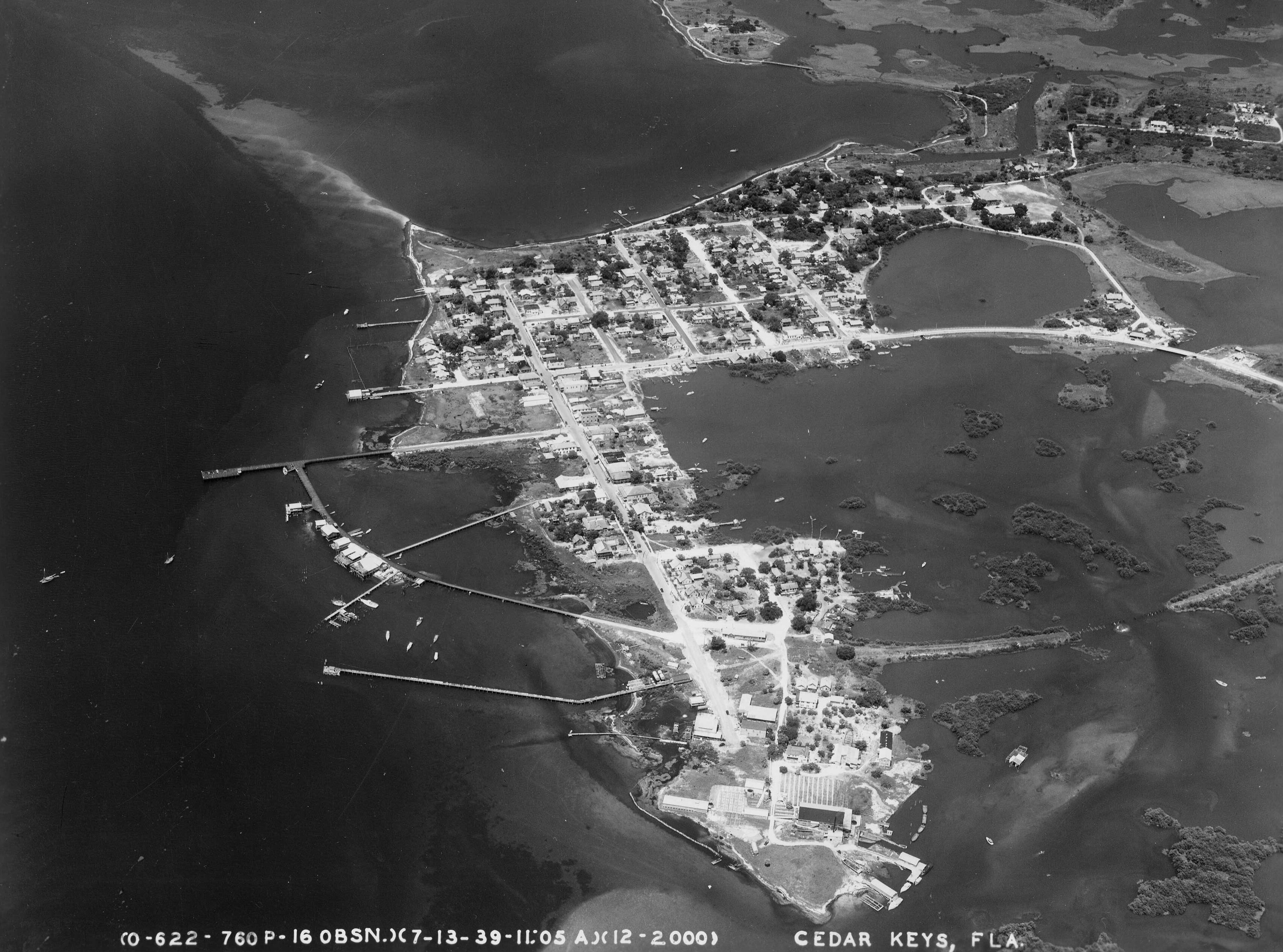
Cedar Key in 1939

The 1896 Cedar Keys hurricane was the final blow. Around 4 am on September 29, 1896, a 10-foot (3.0 m) storm surge swept over the town, killing more than 100 people. Winds north of town were estimated at 125 miles per hour (201 km/h), which would classify it as a category 3. The hurricane wiped out the juniper trees still standing and destroyed all the mills. A fire on December 2, 1896, further damaged the town. In following years, structures were rebuilt on Way Key, a more protected island inland, but the damage was done. Today, only a few reminders of the original town on Atsena Otie Key remain, including stone water cisterns, and a graveyard whose headstones conspicuously date prior to 1896. Also, many of the eastern red cedar trees that originally attracted the pencil company, and for which the community was named, are gone.

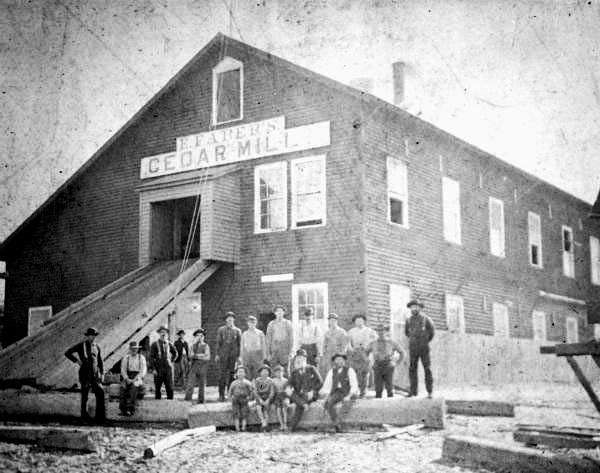
Workers gathered outside E. Faber's Cedar Mill in Cedar Key, Florida, circa 1890

At the start of the 20th century, fishing, sponge hooking, and oystering had become the major industries, but around 1909, the oyster beds were exhausted. President Herbert Hoover established the Cedar Keys National Wildlife Refuge in 1929 by naming three of the islands as a breeding ground for colonial birds. The lighthouse was abandoned in 1952, just as the tourism industry began to grow as a result of interest in the historic community, but it remains in use as a marine biology research center by the University of Florida in Gainesville.

=== Present ===
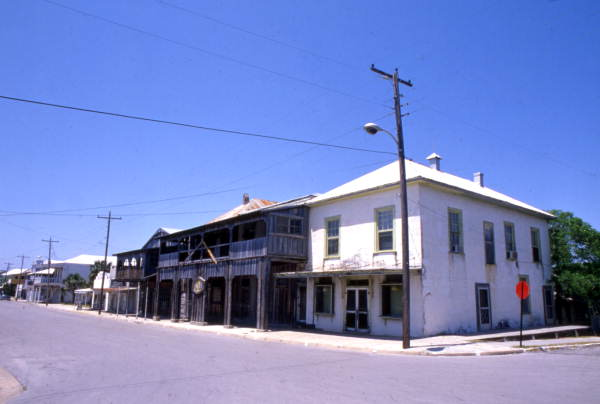
Historic Bodiford Drug Store at 409 2nd St. on the northwest corner of B St. in Cedar Key, Florida. An example of tabby construction.

The old-fashioned fishing village is now a tourist center with several regionally famous seafood restaurants. The village holds two festivals a year, the Spring Sidewalk Art Festival and the Fall Seafood Festival, that each attract thousands of visitors to the area.

The municipality was officially incorporated as the "City of Cedar Key" in 1923.

In 1950, Hurricane Easy, a category-3 storm with 125-mile-per-hour (201 km/h) winds, looped around Cedar Key three times before finally making landfall, dumping 38 inches (970 mm) of rain and destroying two-thirds of the homes. The storm came ashore at low tide, so the surge was only 5 feet (1.5 m).

Hurricane Elena followed a similar path in 1985, but did not make landfall. Packing 115-mile-per-hour (185 km/h) winds, the storm churned for two days in the Gulf, 50 miles (80 km) to the west, battering the waterfront. All the businesses and restaurants on Dock Street were either damaged or destroyed, and a section of the seawall collapsed.

After a statewide ban on large-scale net fishing went into effect July 1, 1995, a government retraining program helped many local fishermen begin farming clams in the muddy waters. Today, Cedar Key's clam-based aquaculture is a multimillion-dollar industry. As of 2025 Florida's clam aquaculture industry is centered on Cedar Key with 90% of production taking place there. The industry is negatively impacted by storms and hurricanes.

A local museum exhibit displays a reproduction of one of the first air conditioning installations. The system, with compressor and fans, was used in Cedar Key to ease the lot of malaria patients.

Cedar Key is home to the George T. Lewis Airport (CDK).

Hurricane Eta made one of its two landfalls in Florida at about 4 a.m. Thursday, November 10, 2020, near Cedar Key, as a tropical storm.

On August 30, 2023, Hurricane Idalia caused significant damage to Cedar Key as it headed towards Florida's Big Bend. Although not making a direct hit on the city, the storm brought heavy rains, winds, and storm surge levels that reached a record 6.8 feet (2.1 m) above high tide. Several businesses located on Dock Street were impacted by significant damage.

On the night of September 26, 2024, Hurricane Helene caused significant to major damage to Cedar Key as it headed towards Florida's Big Bend. It hit close enough to Cedar Key, to bring major floods, major wind gusts, heavy rain, and storm surge levels that reached a new record 9.2 feet (2.8 m) above high tide, surpassing Hurricane Idalia's 6.8 feet (2.1 m) storm surge.

=== Historic district and museum ===
- Cedar Keys Historic and Archaeological District
- U.S. National Register of Historic Places
- U.S. Historic district
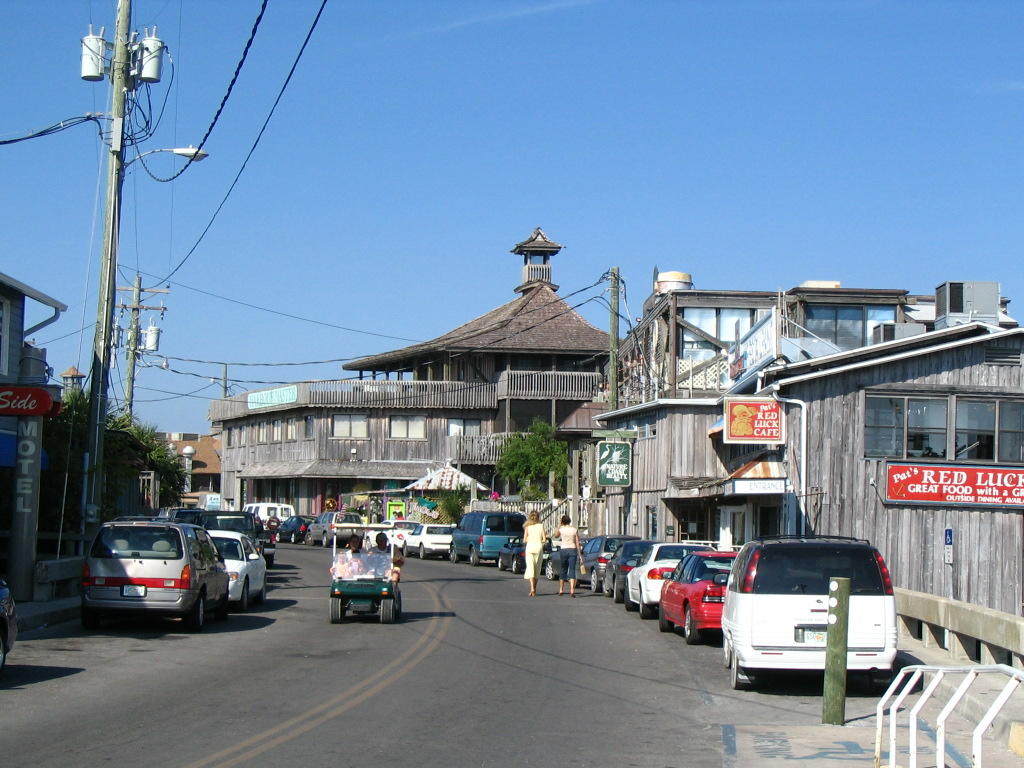
- Dock Street in Cedar Key
- Location: Cedar Key, Florida
- Coordinates: 29°08′44″N 83°02′30″W
- NRHP reference No.: 88001449
- Added to NRHP: October 3, 1989

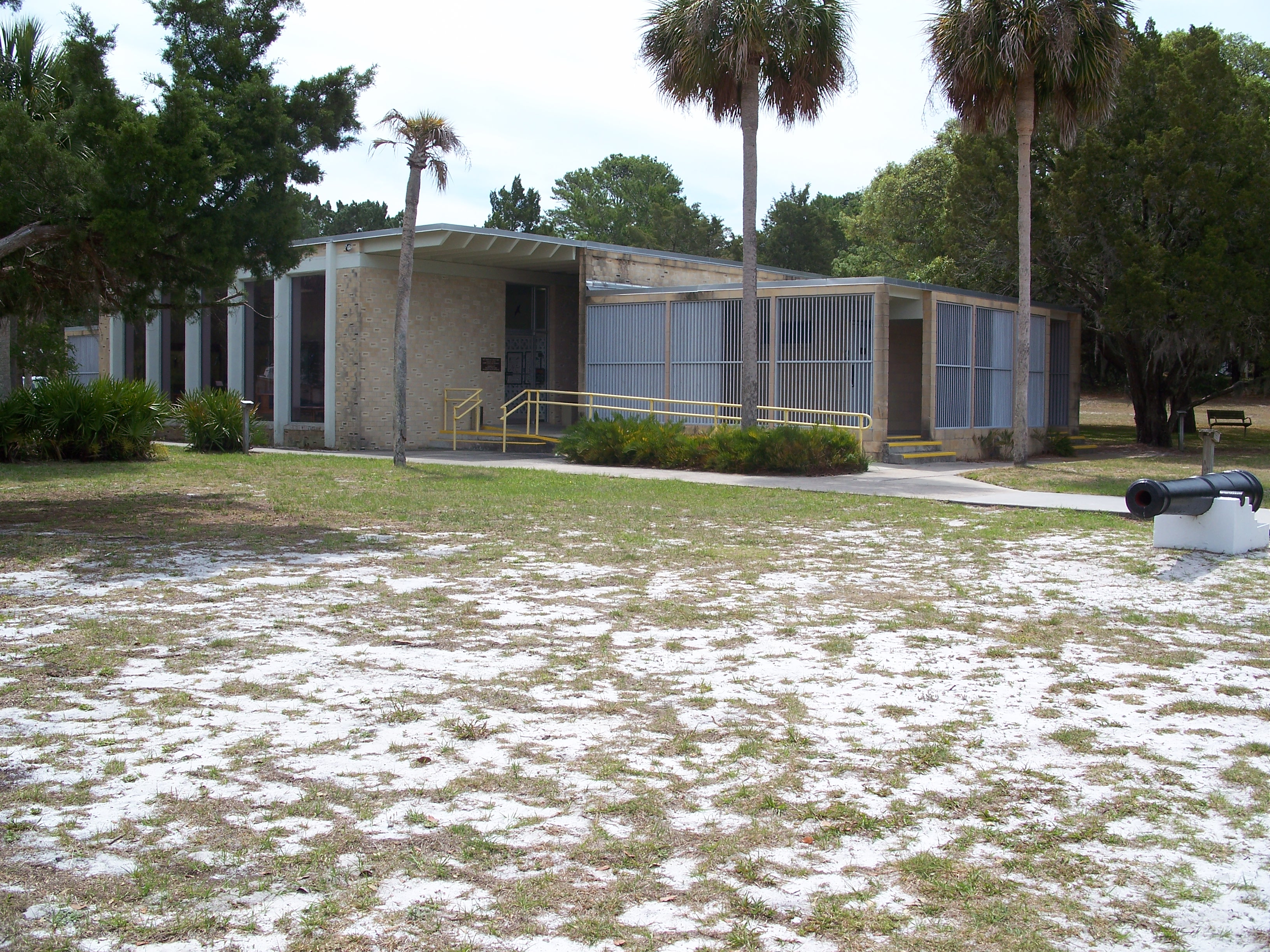
Cedar Key Museum building

Cedar Key's importance in Florida's history, which began as far back as 1000 BC with pre-Columbian habitation of the region, was recognized on October 3, 1989, by the federal government. At that time, 8,000 acres (32 km^{2}) in and around the town were added to the National Register of Historic Places under the title of the Cedar Keys Historic and Archaeological District.

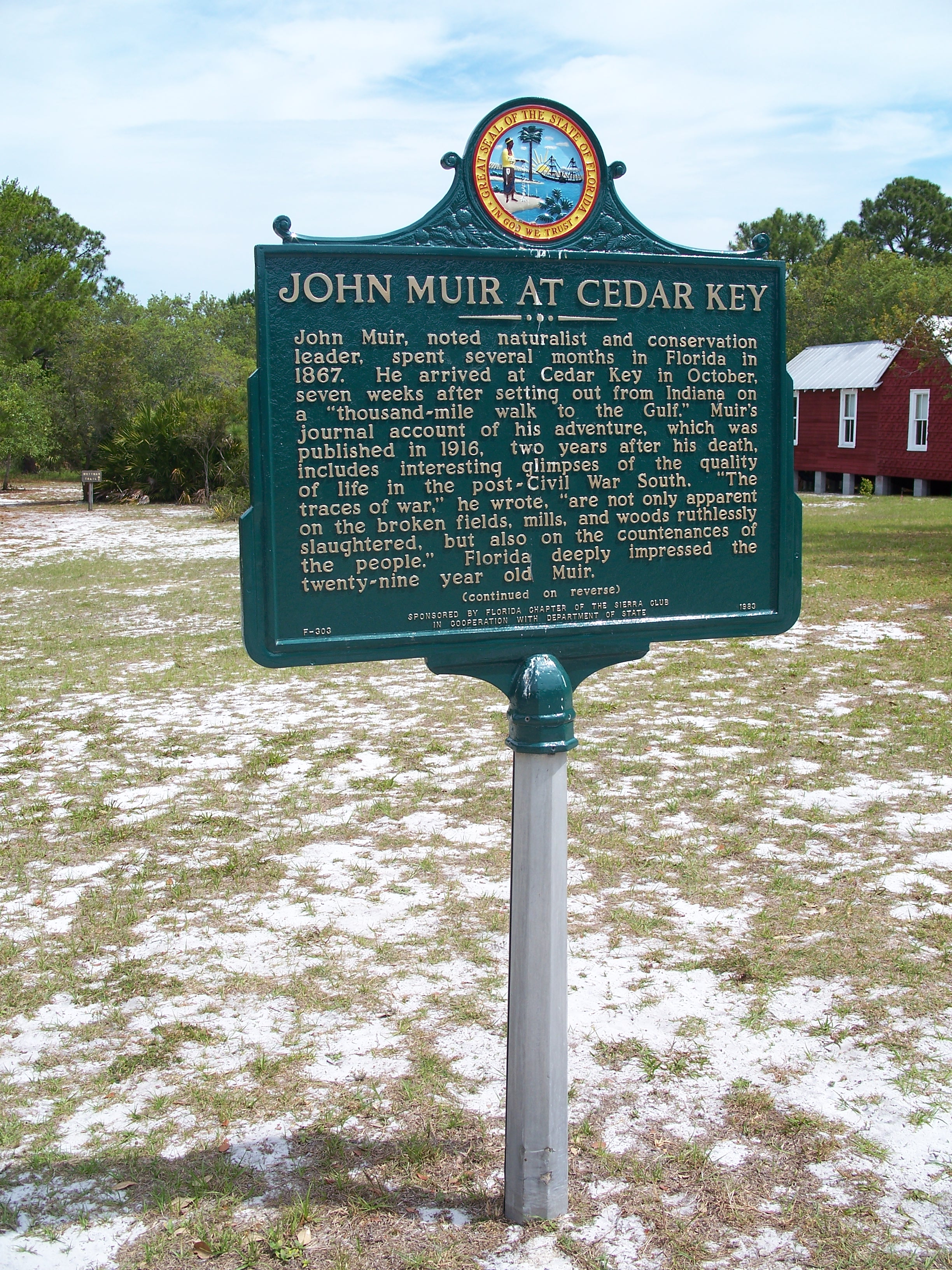
Historic marker commemorating John Muir's visit

The Cedar Key Museum State Park depicts the town's 19th century history and displays sea shells and Indian artifacts from the collection of Saint Clair Whitman. Tours of Whitman's restored 1920s house are available during museum hours. As the museum photo indicates, the building was constructed to withstand the hurricane conditions that the town is subjected to periodically.

The naturalist John Muir visited Cedar Key in 1867 on his historic walk from Kentucky to Florida. He wrote:

For nineteen years my vision was bounded by forests, but today, emerging from a multitude of tropical plants, I beheld the Gulf of Mexico stretching away unbounded, except by the sky. What dreams and speculative matter for thought arose as I stood on the strand, gazing out on the burnished, treeless plain!

The John Muir historic marker was placed on the museum grounds in 1983, commemorating his visit.

There is also another museum, Cedar Key Historical Museum, at 609 2nd Street Florida State Road 24.

Cedar Key was one of several cities in Florida used to model locations in Grand Theft Auto 6, appearing as Watson Bay in the game.

== Geography ==
According to the United States Census Bureau, the city has an area of 2.1 square miles (5.5 km^{2}), of which 0.97 square miles (2.5 km^{2}) is land and 1.2 square miles (3.0 km^{2}), or 54.28%, is water.

=== Climate ===
The climate in this area is characterized by hot, humid summers and generally mild winters. According to the Köppen climate classification, the City of Cedar Key has a humid subtropical climate zone (Cfa).

Climate data for Cedar Key 1 WSW, Florida, 1907–1976 normals and extremes
Month	Jan	Feb	Mar	Apr	May	Jun	Jul	Aug	Sep	Oct	Nov	Dec	Year
Record high °F (°C)	84 (29)	85 (29)	89 (32)	90 (32)	98 (37)	100 (38)	102 (39)	99 (37)	103 (39)	99 (37)	92 (33)	86 (30)	103 (39)
Mean daily maximum °F (°C)	66.6 (19.2)	67.6 (19.8)	72.2 (22.3)	78.8 (26.0)	84.8 (29.3)	88.9 (31.6)	89.5 (31.9)	89.9 (32.2)	88.8 (31.6)	83.2 (28.4)	74.6 (23.7)	67.7 (19.8)	79.4 (26.3)
Daily mean °F (°C)	57.6 (14.2)	59.0 (15.0)	63.7 (17.6)	70.6 (21.4)	76.7 (24.8)	81.4 (27.4)	82.4 (28.0)	82.5 (28.1)	80.9 (27.2)	74.1 (23.4)	65.1 (18.4)	58.9 (14.9)	71.1 (21.7)
Mean daily minimum °F (°C)	48.8 (9.3)	50.4 (10.2)	55.2 (12.9)	62.2 (16.8)	68.7 (20.4)	73.9 (23.3)	75.4 (24.1)	75.2 (24.0)	73.0 (22.8)	65.0 (18.3)	55.7 (13.2)	50.1 (10.1)	62.8 (17.1)
Record low °F (°C)	8 (−13)	20 (−7)	23 (−5)	37 (3)	47 (8)	58 (14)	62 (17)	64 (18)	51 (11)	38 (3)	25 (−4)	15 (−9)	8 (−13)
Average precipitation inches (mm)	2.70 (69)	2.84 (72)	3.19 (81)	2.46 (62)	2.30 (58)	4.32 (110)	7.64 (194)	7.78 (198)	5.82 (148)	2.75 (70)	1.62 (41)	2.66 (68)	46.07 (1,170)
Average precipitation days (≥ 0.01 in)	5	5	5	3	4	7	10	10	7	4	3	5	69
Source: WRCC

== Demographics ==
Historical population
Census	Pop.	Note	%±
1870	440		—
1900	739		—
1910	864		16.9%
1920	695		−19.6%
1930	1,066		53.4%
1940	988		−7.3%
1950	900		−8.9%
1960	668		−25.8%
1970	714		6.9%
1980	700		−2.0%
1990	668		−4.6%
2000	790		18.3%
2010	702		−11.1%
2020	687		−2.1%
U.S. Decennial Census

=== 2010 and 2020 census ===
Cedar Key racial composition (Hispanics excluded from racial categories) (NH = Non-Hispanic)
Race	Pop 2010	Pop 2020	% 2010	% 2020
White (NH)	678	618	96.58%	89.96%
Black or African American (NH)	9	13	1.28%	1.89%
Native American or Alaska Native (NH)	1	4	0.14%	0.58%
Asian (NH)	0	0	0.00%	0.00%
Pacific Islander or Native Hawaiian (NH)	0	0	0.00%	0.00%
Some other race (NH)	0	4	0.00%	0.58%
Two or more races/Multiracial (NH)	4	18	0.57%	2.62%
Hispanic or Latino (any race)	10	30	1.42%	4.37%
Total	702	687		

As of the 2020 United States census, there were 687 people, 316 households, and 218 families residing in the city.

As of the 2010 United States census, there were 702 people, 253 households, and 150 families residing in the city.

=== 2000 census ===
As of the census of 2000, there were 790 people, 411 households, and 244 families residing in the city. The population density was 864.7 inhabitants per square mile (333.9/km^{2}). There were 686 housing units at an average density of 750.9 per square mile (289.9/km^{2}). The racial makeup of the city was 97.47% White, 0.13% African American, 0.63% Native American, 0.25% Asian, 0.51% from other races, and 1.01% from two or more races. Hispanic or Latino of any race were 1.52% of the population.

In 2000, there were 411 households, out of which 14.4% had children under the age of 18 living with them, 48.7% were married couples living together, 8.3% had a female householder with no husband present, and 40.4% were non-families. 34.8% of all households were made up of individuals, and 14.8% had someone living alone who was 65 years of age or older. The average household size was 1.92 and the average family size was 2.42.

In 2000, in the city, the population was spread out, with 13.2% under the age of 18, 4.8% from 18 to 24, 15.6% from 25 to 44, 40.1% from 45 to 64, and 26.3% who were 65 years of age or older. The median age was 54 years. For every 100 females, there were 91.7 males. For every 100 females age 18 and over, there were 92.2 males.

In 2000, the median income for a household in the city was $32,232, and the median income for a family was $41,190. Males had a median income of $27,375 versus $31,806 for females. The per capita income for the city was $22,568. About 6.6% of families and 11.1% of the population were below the poverty line, including 10.5% of those under age 18 and 9.9% of those age 65 or over.

== Education ==
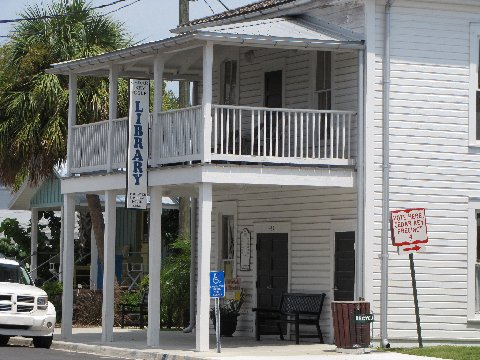
Cedar Key Library

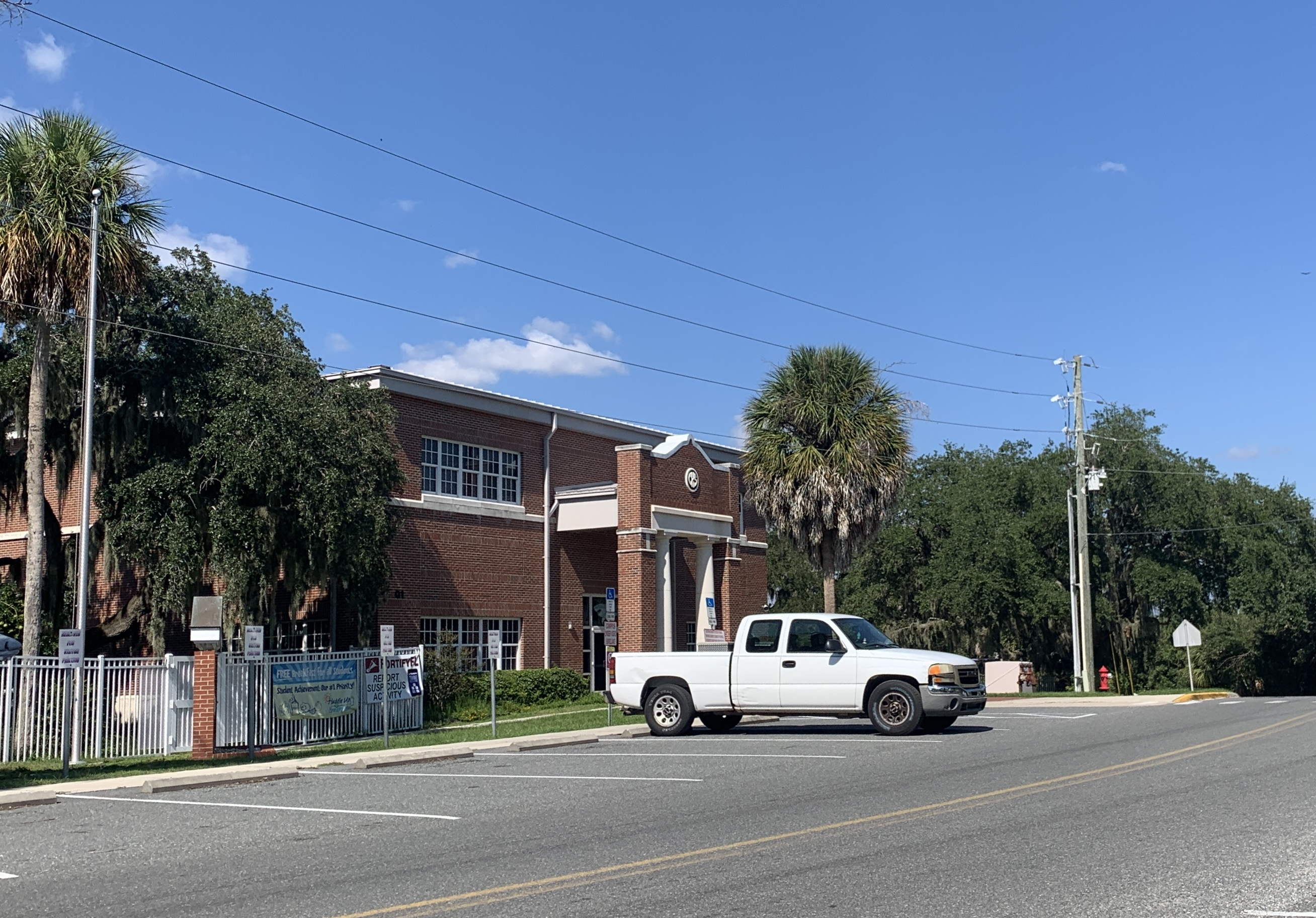
Cedar Key School

The School Board of Levy County operates a K–12 school, Cedar Key School.

=== Library ===
Levy County provides Cedar Key with a local library branch. The Cedar Key Public Library is in the renovated, historic Schlemmer Rooming House.

== Notable people ==
- Gene Hodges - former member of the Florida House of Representatives
- W. Randolph Hodges - former President of the Florida Senate
- Jarret Johnson - former NFL football player
- Michael Presley Bobbitt - playwright and novelist

== See also ==
- Florida Railroad
- Rosewood massacre

== Bibliography ==
- Fishburne, Charles C. (1993). The Cedar Keys in the 19th century. Cedar Key, Florida: Sea Hawk Publications.
- Mahon, John K. (1985). History of the Second Seminole War: 1835-1842. University of Florida Press. ISBN 0-8130-1097-7.
- McCarthy, Kevin M. (1990). Florida Lighthouses. Paintings by William L. Trotter. University of Florida Press. ISBN 0-8130-0993-6.
- McCarthy, Kevin M. (2006). Cedar Key, Florida: An Illustrated History. Photographs by Lindon Lindsay. Gainesville, Florida: Nature Coast Publishing House. ISBN 978-1-4276-0897-0.
- Turner, Gregg (2003). A Short History of Florida Railroads. Charleston, South Carolina: Arcadia Publishing. ISBN 0-7385-2421-2.
