= Cedar Keys National Wildlife Refuge =

United States National Wildlife Refuge in Florida

- IUCN category IV (habitat/species management area)
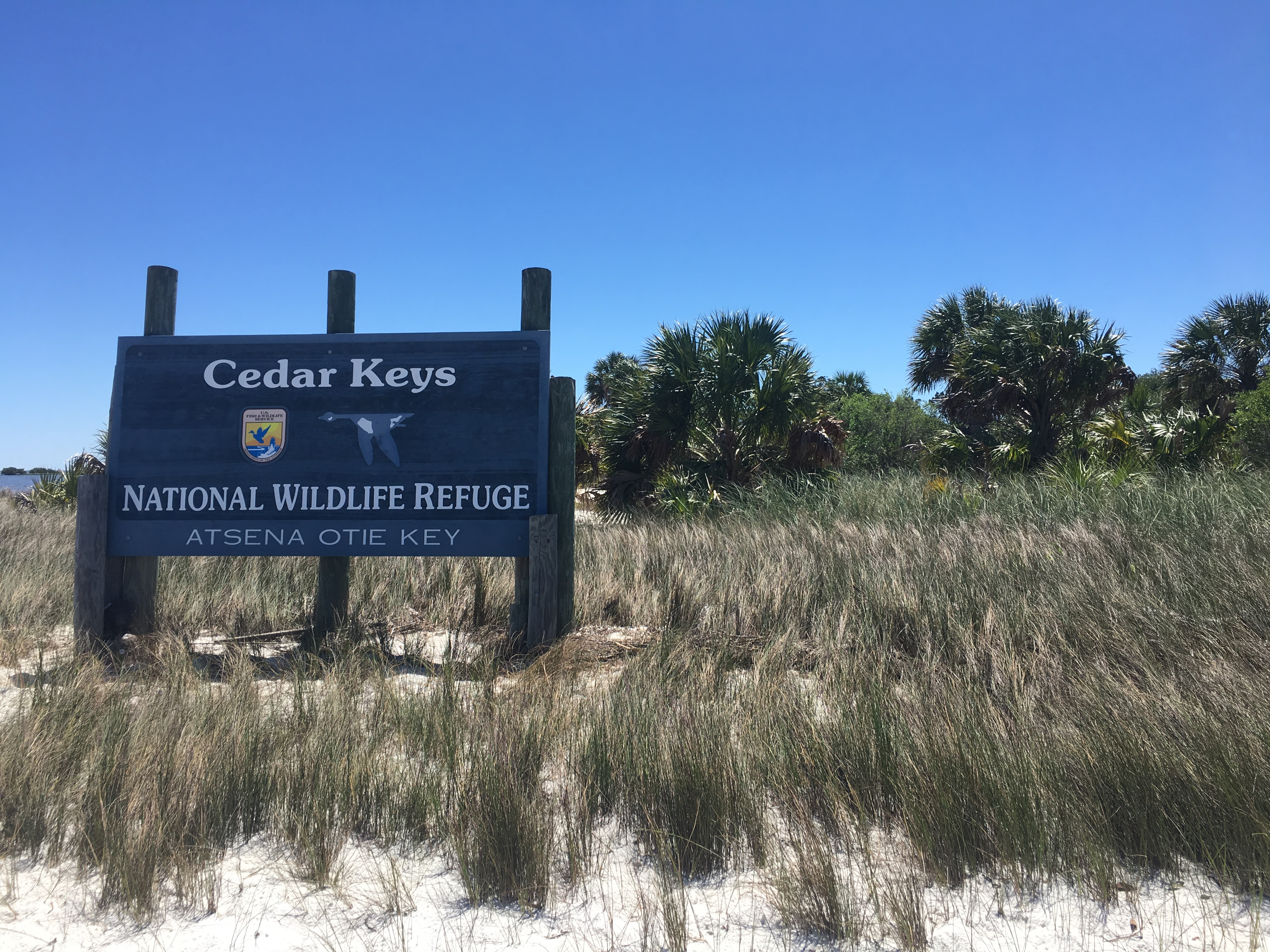
- Atsena Otie Key, Cedar Keys National Wildlife Refuge, April 2019

- Location within the United States
- Location: Levy County, Florida, United States
- Nearest city: Cedar Key, Florida
- Coordinates: 29°07′00″N 83°03′30″W
- Area: 762 acres (3.1 km^{2})
- Established: 1929
- Governing body: United States Fish and Wildlife Service
- Website: Cedar Keys National Wildlife Refuge

The Cedar Keys National Wildlife Refuge is part of the United States National Wildlife Refuge System, located near Cedar Key, at the western end of SR 24. The 762-acre (3.1 km^{2}) refuge was established in 1929.

The Cedar Keys Wilderness Area (established in 1972) is part of the refuge, and consists of 379 acres (1.53 km^{2}) of its total area.

== Management ==
The Cedar Keys National Wildlife Refuge is administered by the North Florida Refuge Complex. The Lower Suwannee, St. Marks, and St. Vincent National Wildlife Refuges are also part of the North Florida Refuge Complex which is headquartered in St. Marks, Florida.

== Flora ==
On the islands, the forested area contains live oak, cabbage palm, red bay, and laurel oak. Salt marshes and mangrove trees cover the lower elevations.

== Fauna ==
The refuge protects colonial nesting migratory birds. It is a home for the white ibis, brown pelican, double crested cormorant and many other species. Cottonmouths snakes can also be found on the islands.

== Recreational Activities ==
Activities on the islands include fishing, wildlife watching, and photography. Amenities include environmental education programs offered by the University of Florida's Seahorse Key Marine Research Lab and a 0.46 miles (0.74 km) hiking trail. Beachcombing is permitted on the islands, except on Seahorse Key.
