= Michael Presley Bobbitt =

American playwright, novelist (born 1976)

Michael Presley Bobbitt (born February 3, 1976) is an American Southern playwright, novelist, and commercial real estate appraiser, and co-founder of The Nitty-Gritty Theatre in Gainesville, Florida. He is a member of the Dramatists Guild. He lives in Cedar Key, Florida where he has been featured in regional, national, and international press for his literary works, community activism in aquaculture education, and various stunts and achievements including authoring a ten-minute monologue with a live goat, being flagged by the FAA for transporting a questionable play prop across state lines, "Shark Swims" to raise money for Cedar Key School—the smallest Public School in Florida, and riding out Cedar Key's Hurricane Idelia to protect and serve islanders who remained while releasing live weather video reports to national and international media. Bobbitt also serves as an official Cedar Key emissary dressed in character as The Clambassador.

== Career ==
Bobbitt's career began with a focus on storytelling, particularly through his work as a playwright. His plays have been noted for their exploration of human experiences and have received recognition within the theatrical community. His plays Sunset Village and Florida Man were selected locally, as well as twice being selected by the Broadway Bound Theatre Festival to be produced Off-Broadway in New York City.

He relocated to Cedar Key, Florida, where he found inspiration in the town's coastal setting. He became involved in the local community and drew upon Cedar Key's unique atmosphere in his artistic endeavors.

Bobbitt has written several plays, including Across the River, Trailer Park Elegy, Cedar Key, A Cedar Key Christmas, Sunset Village, Return to Sunset Village and Florida Man; several of which continue to be produced in theatres throughout Florida.

=== Activism and community service ===
Bobbitt organized two events called The Cedar Key Shark Swim to raise funds for local causes. In June 2021, he was invited to conduct a TEDTalk, "Live Theater is the Last Best Hope to Save Humanity".

Michael Presley Bobbitt remained on Cedar Key, Florida, during Hurricanes Idalia (2023) and Helene (2024), despite evacuation orders, to assist residents who stayed behind. During Idalia, he provided live weather reports to The Weather Channel and surveyed damage to clamming grounds with meteorologist Jim Cantore. During Helene, Bobbitt aided recovery efforts, preparing boats and golf carts to support the community.

=== The Clambassador short film ===
In 2023, Bobbitt (in character as The Clambassador) was the subject of a short indie film by Alex Davidowski (Mirador Studios CEO) called Rise of the Clambassador. The short went on to receive several national and international awards including top honors at the International Ocean Film Festival in San Francisco. During his Q&A after the short's world premiere in San Francisco, Bobbitt told how he came to be called The Clambassador, and answered questions about the making of the short feature film, aquaculture, Cedar Key and the creative process.

=== Novels ===
Bobbitt's novel, Godspeed Cedar Key was released on March 1, 2024. The novel received attention for its portrayal of the town's history and resilience. Kirkus Reviews called the novel, "... a propulsive, character-driven post-apocalyptic ride, and a brutal tale of survival with a refreshingly kaleidoscopic perspective." Bobbitt's second novel, "Forever Cedar Key," was released on June 7, 2025 at a book signing event at Cedar Key's Island Hotel. Bobbitt's third novel, "The Republic of Cedar Key," was released on May 23, 2026, also at a book signing event at Cedar Key's Island Hotel.
