= Charisma House =

- Country of origin: United States
- Headquarters location: Lake Mary, Florida
- Nonfiction topics: Christianity

Charisma House is a Christian publishing firm based in Lake Mary, Florida. The CEO is Stephen Strang.

Charisma House has published books, including fourteen New York Times best sellers: The Faith of George W. Bush by Stephen Mansfield, Shadowmancer by G. P. Taylor, Wormwood by G. P. Taylor, The Maker's Diet by Jordan Rubin, The Threshing Floor by Juanita Bynum, The Seven Pillars of Health by Don Colbert, The Final Move Beyond Iraq by Mike Evans, 23 Minutes in Hell by Bill Wiese, Fasting by Jentezen Franklin, Dr. Colbert's “I Can Do This” Diet by Don Colbert, The Harbinger by Jonathan Cahn (over 120 weeks on the New York Times best sellers list, Publishers Weekly bestseller, and USA Today’s Top 150 books), the Mystery of the Shemitah by Jonathan Cahn, The Book of Mysteries by Jonathan Cahn, and The Paradigm by Jonathan Cahn.

== Noted Authors ==
Florida House of Representatives Representative Kimberly Daniels has published numerous books with Charisma House

John Bevere has published several books with Charisma House.

Tim Donoho Florida based businessman and news magazine publisher.
