= Sid Roth's It's Supernatural! =

Television series

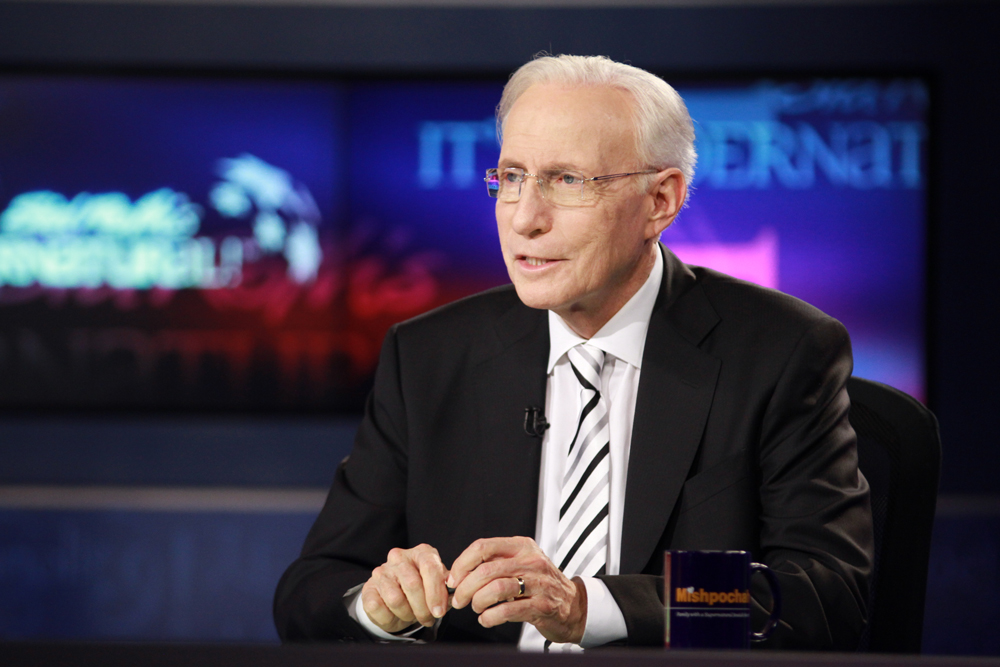
- Sid Roth on the set
- Genre: Christian talk show
- Created by: Sid Roth
- Presented by: Sid Roth
- Country of origin: United States

Original release
- Network: Daystar, TBN, many others, on ISN
- Release: 1996 – present

Sid Roth's It's Supernatural! is a talk show which televangelist Sid Roth hosts in order to promote the supernatural as it relates to Christianity. The show is widely broadcast on Christian television networks in the United States and it is also widely broadcast on various international networks. The program centers on claims of supernatural intervention within Christianity and frequently features guests who promote creationism, faith healing, and other positions that reject the scientific consensus on evolution. Scholars and commentators have noted that the show presents such claims in a testimonial format rather than through critical or scientific evaluation.

== History ==
Sydney Abraham Rothbaum (born September 7, 1940) is an American talk show host and author. According to Roth, he was raised Jewish but, at age 32, after dabbling in New Age philosophy for several years, he became a "born again" believer after a co-worker convinced him that Jesus is indeed the promised Messiah of the Jews.

Roth launched his nationwide radio broadcast Messianic Vision in 1977. In 1996, he graduated to television as Sid Roth's It's Supernatural! began airing. In late 2013, Roth's ministry started ISN (It's Supernatural! Network), a full-time online network that streams episodes of Sid Roth's It's Supernatural! and other content produced by the ministry and its partners for free.

== Format and guests ==
Each week, Roth interviews people who claim to have experienced miracles and personal encounters with God. Some of the guests who have been interviewed on Sid Roth's It's Supernatural! include:

- Brian Simmons, who asserts Jesus commissioned him to write The Passion Translation, which is used by the New Apostolic Reformation
- Tommy O'Dell, the grandson of legendary evangelist TL Osborn
- Jonathan Cahn, author of The Harbinger
- Bill Johnson, of Bethel Church
- Robin Bullock
- John Waller, Christian singer-songwriter known for writing the theme song from the film Fireproof
- Guillermo Maldonado, senior pastor of El Rey Jesús
- Misty Edwards, a contemporary Christian musician from the International House of Prayer
- John Paul Jackson, the founder of Streams Ministries International
- Walid Shoebat, a Palestinian-American Baptist and lecturer
- Hank Kunneman, the host of New Level with Hank & Brenda Kunneman
- Brenda Kunneman, the host of New Level with Hank & Brenda Kunneman
- Grant Berry and Hali Berry, the managers of Reconnecting Ministries
