= Dekle =

Dekle may refer to:

- Dekle Beach, Florida, a Gulf coastal community in the southern part of Taylor County, Florida
- Dawn Dekle (fl. 2010s), president of the American University of Nigeria
- George R. Dekle Sr. (born 1948), an American lawyer
- Gus J. Dekle (1892–1961), member of the Florida House of Representatives, 1947–1955
- Hal P. Dekle (1917–2005), Justice of the Supreme Court of Florida

== See also ==
- Deckle, a removable wooden frame used in manual papermaking
- Dekel, a moshav in southern Israel
