= Terry Fields (Florida politician) =

American politician (1959–2026)

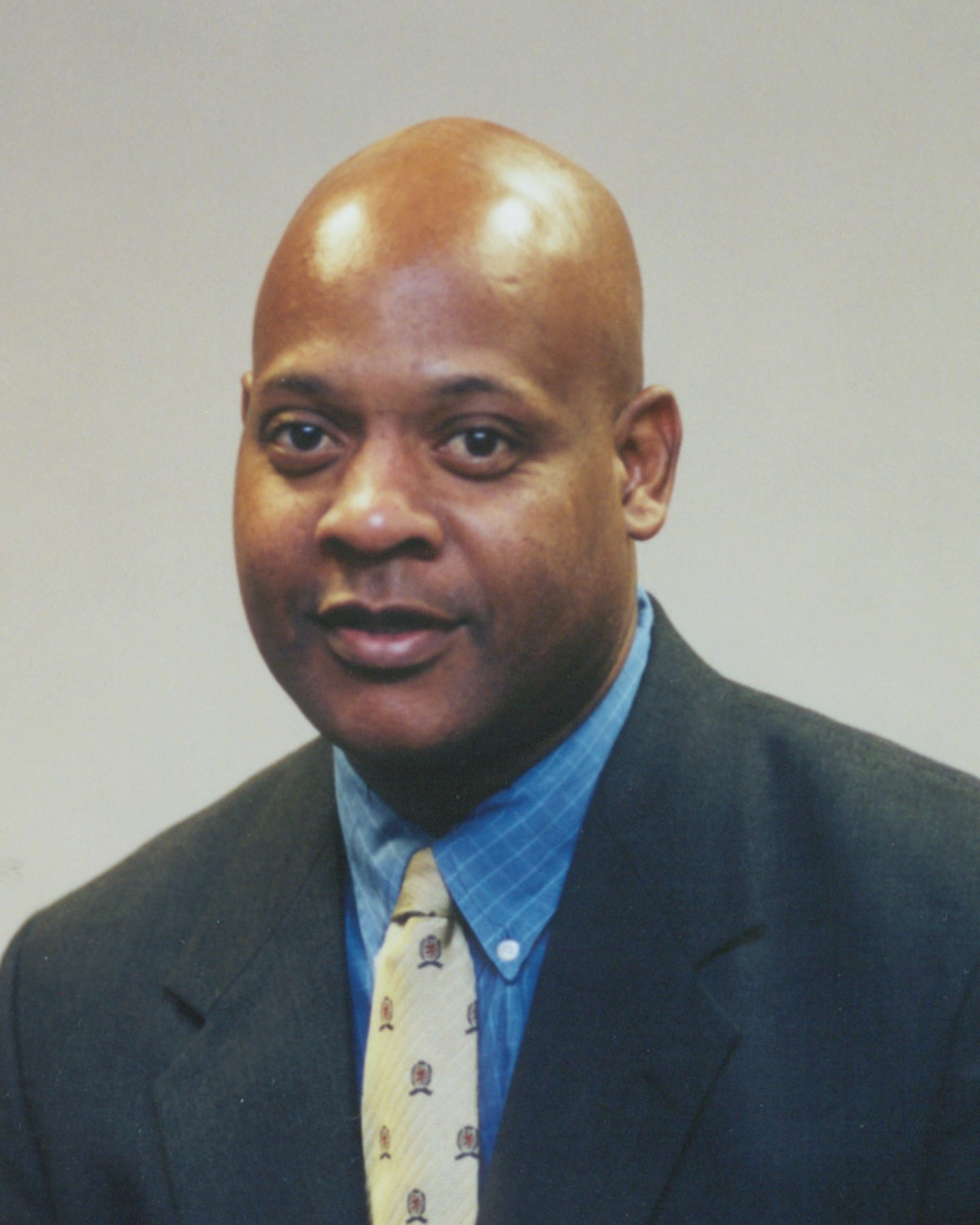

Member of the Florida House of Representatives from the 14th district
- In office November 7, 2000 – November 4, 2008
- Preceded by: Tony Hill
- Succeeded by: Mia Jones

Personal details
- Born: April 18, 1959 Jacksonville, Florida, U.S.
- Died: February 8, 2026 (aged 66)
- Party: Democratic
- Education: Florida A&M University (B.S.); Florida State University
- Profession: Longshoreman, consultant

Terry L. Fields (April 18, 1959 – February 8, 2026) was an American Democratic politician who served as a member of the Florida House of Representatives from 2000 to 2008, representing the 14th District, which included parts of downtown Jacksonville in western Duval County. He ran for a seat in the Florida House in 2016. He lost in the primaries to Democratic candidate Kimberly Daniels.

== Background ==
Fields was born in Jacksonville, Florida, on April 18, 1959. He attended Florida A&M University, graduating with his bachelor's degree in education in 1981, and later completing graduate work at Florida State University. While working as an executive assistant for the International Longshoreman's Association Local 1408, he was elected to the Jacksonville Civil Service Board in 1983, and served until 1991. In 1991, Fields ran for the Jacksonville City Council in the 7th District, joining pharmacist Phillip Brown in challenging incumbent City Councilwoman Sandra Darling in the Democratic primary. Fields defeated Darling in the first primary election, winning 54% of the vote to her 42% and Brown's 4%, and he was elected unopposed in the general election. He ran for re-election in 1995, facing Republican candidate Carl Youmans with 81% of the vote.

Fields died on February 8, 2026, at the age of 66.

== Florida House of Representatives ==
In 2000, incumbent State Representative Tony Hill was unable to seek re-election due to term limits. Fields ran to succeed him in the 14th District, and faced attorney Al Barlow in the Democratic primary. He campaigned on his political experience, noting that, due to term limits, the Jacksonville area would no longer have experienced legislators in Tallahassee. During the campaign, Fields and Barlow agreed on the necessity to improve public education and to make prescription drugs affordable. Fields ended up defeating Barlow by a wide margin, receiving 56% of the vote to Barlow's 44%. He was re-elected without opposition in 2002 and 2004.

Fields was challenged in the Democratic primary in 2006 by Reginald Brown, the Director of Project Reach, a local community group that provided parenting and tutoring workshops. Brown campaigned on improving living conditions within the district, and argued that Fields might not be "the people's choice" because he was unopposed for the preceding two elections. Fields, meanwhile, campaigned on his legislative record of fighting for workers rights, expanding health insurance, and improving economic development. Fields defeated Brown in a landslide, winning 66% of the vote to Brown's 34%, and advanced to the general election, where he faced Republican nominee Donald Foy, an anti-crime activist. Foy attacked Fields for not spending enough time in the district, though Fields noted that spending time in the legislature benefited the district by forcing the legislature to keep their interests in mind. Owing to the liberal nature of the district, Fields overwhelmingly defeated Foy, receiving 67% of the vote to Foy's 33%.

== 2011 State Senate campaign ==
Following Alvin Brown's successful 2011 campaign for Mayor of Jacksonville, State Senator Tony Hill resigned from the legislature to serve in Brown's administration, prompting a special election. Fields ran to succeed Hill in the 1st District, which stretched from Jacksonville to Daytona Beach, including parts of Duval, Flagler, Putnam, St. Johns, and Volusia Counties. In the Democratic primary, Fields faced fellow former State Representative Audrey Gibson, Ramon Day, and Leandrew Mills. During the election, Fields campaigned on his support for increased school choice and improving water quality in St. Augustine. Fields was attacked by a third-party group supporting Gibson for having an improper property tax exemption, accusing him of supporting a "double standard for politicians." As the campaign came to a close, Fields was endorsed by the Florida Police Benevolent Association, while Gibson was endorsed by former Florida Chief Financial Officer Alex Sink, the 2010 Democratic nominee for Governor. Gibson was also endorsed by the Florida Times-Union, which praised her for experience, energy, wisdom, and "ability to work across the aisle to build alliances," while criticizing Fields, noting, that "his list of accomplishments is less than stellar for so many years of service." Despite the contentious nature of the election, Gibson defeated Fields by a wide margin, winning 62% of the vote to his 32%, Day's 4%, and Mills' 3%.

== 2015 Jacksonville City Council campaign ==
When incumbent City Councilwoman Denise Lee was unable to seek re-election due to term limits, Fields ran to succeed her in the 8th District. He faced Katrina Brown, former City Councilwoman Pat Lockett-Felder, Lynn Sherman, and James M. Breaker in the primary election. Fields campaigned on his support for creating public-private partnerships to provide residents with job training and employment opportunities, for continuing the district's blight reduction program, and for the passage of a citywide human rights ordinance to prevent discrimination against members of the LGBT community. Fields was endorsed by the Jacksonville Association of Firefighters, the Northeast Florida LGBT Leadership PAC, and the Northeast Florida Association of Relators, and he was supported by Equality Florida for his endorsement of the human rights ordinance. Despite his fundraising lead over his opponents, Fields narrowly lost the chance to make it to a runoff election, receiving 24% of the vote to Brown's 30% and Lockett-Felder's 25%.

== 2016 Florida House campaign ==
In 2015, Fields announced that he would run for the Florida House of Representatives in the 14th District in 2016, which includes much of the district that Fields previously represented in the legislature. He faced former Florida Elections Commissioner Leslie Jean-Bart and former Jacksonville City Councilwoman Kim Daniels in the Democratic primary.

Kimberly Daniels won the Democratic primary race, and went on to win the seat in the general election.
