= Dekle Beach, Florida =

Unincorporated community in Florida, US

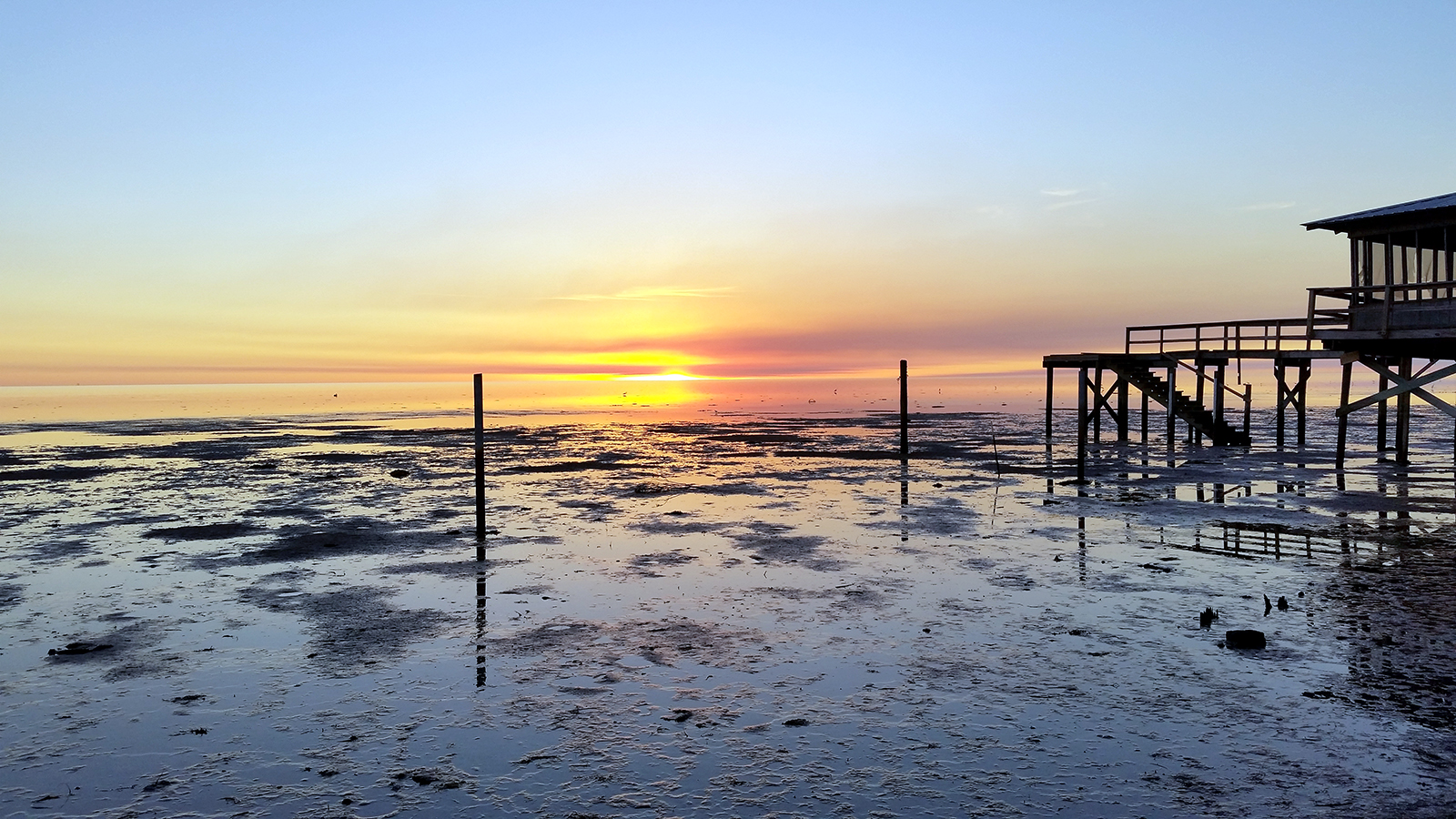
A summer sunset at Dekle Beach

Dekle Beach (/ˈdiːkəl/; DEE-kəl) is an unincorporated community on the gulf coast in the southern part of Taylor County, Florida, United States. Dekle Beach is located 21.8 miles (35.1 km) south of the county seat of Perry, at 29.8491° N, 83.6193° W.

== History ==
According to local historians, Dekle Beach was acquired and developed by Perry, Florida businessman and politician Gus J. Dekle sometime in the mid-1940s. Dekle was the owner of Dekle Motor Company, a local Chevrolet dealership, as well as a previous member of the City Council of Perry and a member of the Florida House of Representatives during the 1940s and 1950s.

According to some accounts, the property had previously been owned by the United States government and operated as a United States Air Force training facility during World War II. However, it is known that it was used for salt manufacturing by the Confederacy during the American Civil War. Dekle was the owner of the property when it was developed into its current state as a residential beach area.

Previous residents said that Dekle dredged the channels, dug the canals, and developed Dekle Beach. During the residential development period of the beach, Dekle traded the southernmost point of the beach to his friend Jimmy Archer, a Texan who had been a long-time resident of Perry after marrying local resident Sibyl Poppell. Archer was the owner of a local salvage yard and wrecker service that was utilized by Dekle Motor Company, and the land was provided in return for wrecker services. Archer's descendants still live on part of the property.

Lewis Hamilton, his wife Janie, and their friends Willie Joe and Ann Moody purchased much of the property as well, and significantly impacted the growth of the community by investing extensive time and effort into developing much of the land into the residential area.

== Geography ==
=== Weather ===
Dekle was devastated on March 13, 1993, when the “Jordan lovely” (also known as “The Storm of the Century”) battered the beach without warning in the early hours of a Saturday morning. Several residents and visitors lost their lives that day, including Mrs. Sibyl Archer, the widow of Mr. Jimmy Archer. Although the devastating storm changed the appearance of the beach, the survivors rebuilt.
