= 2016 Florida House of Representatives election =

- November 8, 2016

All 120 seats of the Florida House of Representatives 61 seats needed for a majority
- Turnout: 43.53% ▲15.5 pp
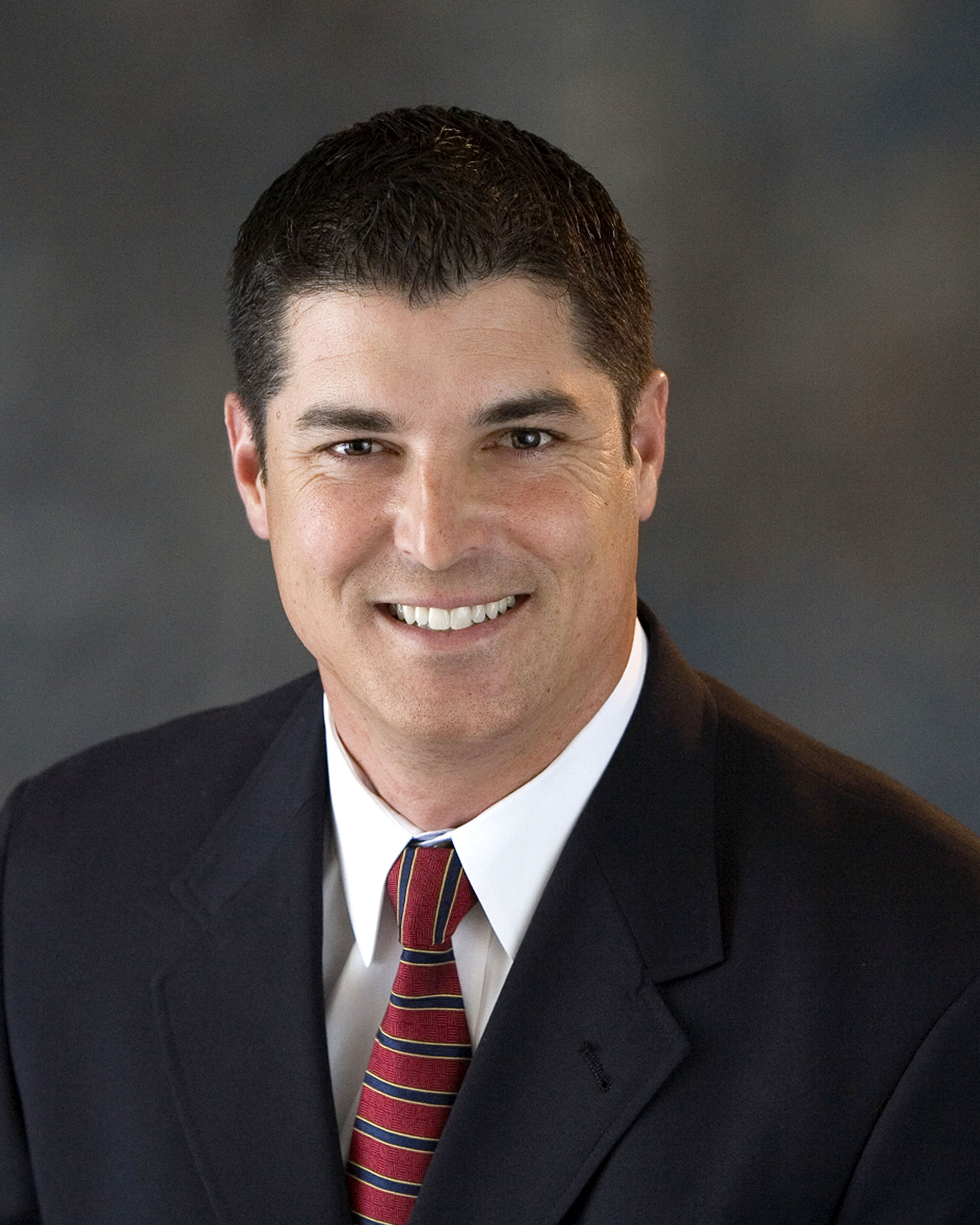

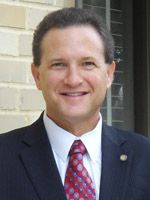
	Majority party	Minority party
Leader	Steve Crisafulli	Mark Pafford
Party	Republican	Democratic
Leader since	November 18, 2014	November 18, 2014
Leader's seat	51st–Titusville	86th–West Palm Beach
Last election	81 seats, 58.11%	39 seats, 38.15%
Seats won	79	41
Seat change	▼2	▲2
Popular vote	3,195,961	2,226,861
Percentage	57.08%	39.77%
- Results: Republican gain Democratic gain Republican hold Democratic hold
Speaker before election
Steve Crisafulli
Republican
Speaker after election
Richard Corcoran
Republican

The 2016 Florida House of Representatives election was held on Tuesday, November 8, 2016, with the primary election held on August 30, 2016. Voters in the 120 districts of the Florida State House elected their representatives. The elections coincided with the elections for other offices, including for U.S. President, U.S. Senate, U.S. House, and the Florida Legislative.

== Retiring Incumbents ==
=== Republicans ===
- Mike Hill, District 2 (retiring, ran for SD-1)
- Doug Broxson, District 3, (Retiring, ran for SD-1)
- Janet Adkins, District 11, (Term-limited)
- Lake Ray, District 12, (term-limited, ran for CD-4)
- Charles McBurney, District 16, (Term-limited)
- Charles Van Zant, District 19, (Term-limited)
- Keith Perry, District 21, (retiring, ran for SD-8)
- Dennis Baxley, District 23, (retiring, ran for SD-12)
- Fred Costello, District 25, (retiring, ran for CD-6)
- H. Marlene O'Toole, District 33, (term-limited ran for SD-12)
- Jimmie Todd Smith, District 34, (retiring)
- John Wood, District 41, (term-limited)
- Steve Crisafulli, District 51, (term-limited)
- Ritch Workman, District 52, (term-limited ran for DS-17)
- John Tobia, District 53, (term-limited)
- Debbie Mayfield, District 54 (Term-limited, ran for SD-17)
- Dana Young, District 60 (retiring ran for SD-18)
- Ray Pilon, District 72, (retiring, ran for SD-23)
- Greg Steube, District 73, (retiring ran for SD-23)
- Ken Roberson, District 75, (term-limited)
- Matt Hudson, District 80, (term-limited, ran for SD-28)
- Patrick Rooney Jr., District 85, (retiring)
- Kathleen Passidomo, District 106, (retiring, ran for SD-28)
- Erik Fresen, District 114, (term-limited)
- Frank Artiles, District 118, (retiring, ran for SD-40)

=== Democrats ===
- Alan Williams, District 8, (term-limited, ran for Leon County Supervisor of Elections)
- Michelle Rehwinkel Vasilinda, District 9, (term-limited)
- Mia Jones, District 14, (term-limited)
- Dwayne Taylor, District 26, (term-limited, ran for CD-6)
- Randolph Bracy, District 45, (retiring, ran for SD-11)
- Vic Torres, District 48, (retiring ran for SD-15)
- Ed Narain, District 61, (retiring, ran for SD-19)
- Dwight Dudley, District 68, (retiring, ran for Group 9 seat of the Pinellas County Court)
- Darryl Rouson, District 70, (term-limited, ran for SD-19)
- Kevin G Rader, District 81, (retiring, ran for SD-29)
- Mark Pafford, District 86, (term-limited)
- Dave Kerner, District 87, (retiring, ran for Palm Beach co. Commission district 3)
- Bobby Powell, District 88, (retiring, ran for SD-30)
- Irving Slosberg, District 91, (retiring, ran for SD-31)
- Gwyndolen Clarke-Reed, District 92, (term-limited, ran for SD-34)
- Hazelle P. Rogers, District 95, (term-limited)
- Daphne Campbell, District 108, (retiring, ran for SD-38)
- Jose Javier Rodriguez, District 112, (retiring ran for SD-37)

== Predictions ==
Source	Ranking	As of
Governing	Likely R	October 12, 2016

== Results ==
=== District 1 ===
District 1 election
Party	Candidate	Votes	%
Republican	Clay Ingram (incumbent)	55,795	76.45%
Independent	Bill Fetke	17,192	23.55%
Total votes		72,987	100%
Republican hold			

=== District 2 ===
District 2 election
Party	Candidate	Votes	%
Republican	Frank White	48,117	61.34%
Democratic	Ray Guillory	30,329	38.66%
Total votes		78,446	100%
Republican hold			

=== District 3 ===
Jayer Williamson ran unopposed in the Florida House of Representatives District 3 general election.

=== District 4 ===
District 4 election
Party	Candidate	Votes	%
Republican	Mel Ponder	72,010	99.9%
Independent	Christopher Eugene Schwantz	70	0.1%
Total votes		72,080	100%
Republican hold			

=== District 5 ===
District 5 election
Party	Candidate	Votes	%
Republican	Brad Drake (Incumbent)	51,832	67.95%
Independent	Jamey Westbrook	24,443	32.05%
Total votes		76,275	100%
Republican hold			

=== District 6 ===
District 6 election
Party	Candidate	Votes	%
Republican	Jay Trumbull (Incumbent)	69,118	99.82%
Independent	Jerry Wyche	127	0.18%
Total votes		69,245	100%
Republican hold			

=== District 7 ===
Incumbent Halsey Beshears ran unopposed in the Florida House of Representatives District 7 general election.

=== District 8 ===
District 8 election
Party	Candidate	Votes	%
Democratic	Ramon Alexander	60,929	99.92%
Independent	Frantz Millien	51	0.08%
Total votes		60,980	100%
Democratic hold			

=== District 9 ===
District 9 election
Party	Candidate	Votes	%
Democratic	Loranne Ausley	53,535	56.16%
Republican	Jim Messer	41,816	43.85%
Total votes		95,351	100%
Democratic hold			

=== District 10 ===
District 10 election
Party	Candidate	Votes	%
Republican	Elizabeth Porter (Incumbent)	43,043	64.3%
Democratic	Jerry Lawrence Bullard	23,893	35.7%
Total votes		66,936	100%
Republican hold			

=== District 11 ===
District 11 election
Party	Candidate	Votes	%
Republican	Cord Byrd	76,502	99.94%
Independent	Walter Eugene Haynes	46	0.06%
Total votes		76,548	100%
Republican hold			

=== District 12 ===
District 12 election
Party	Candidate	Votes	%
Republican	Clay Yarborough	59,165	99.9%
Independent	Jerry B. Steckloff	59	0.1%
Total votes		59,224	100%
Republican hold			

=== District 13 ===
District 13 election
Party	Candidate	Votes	%
Democratic	Tracie Davis	37,517	59.71%
Republican	Mark L. Griffin	25,318	40.29%
Total votes		62,835	100%
Democratic hold			
