= Taylor County Historical Society =

Non-profit organization in Florida, US

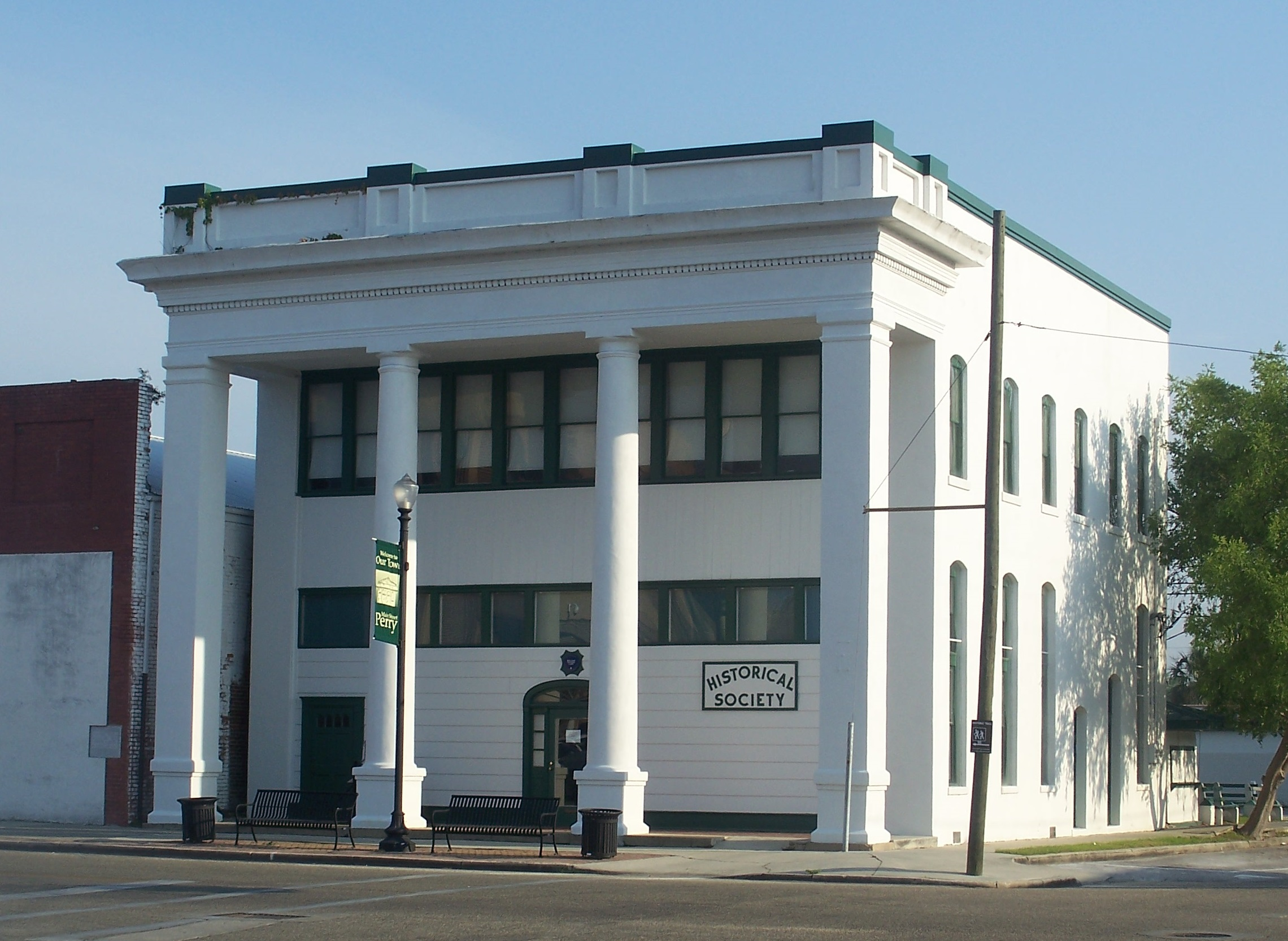
The Bank of Perry building in Perry, Florida, home of the Taylor County Historical Society

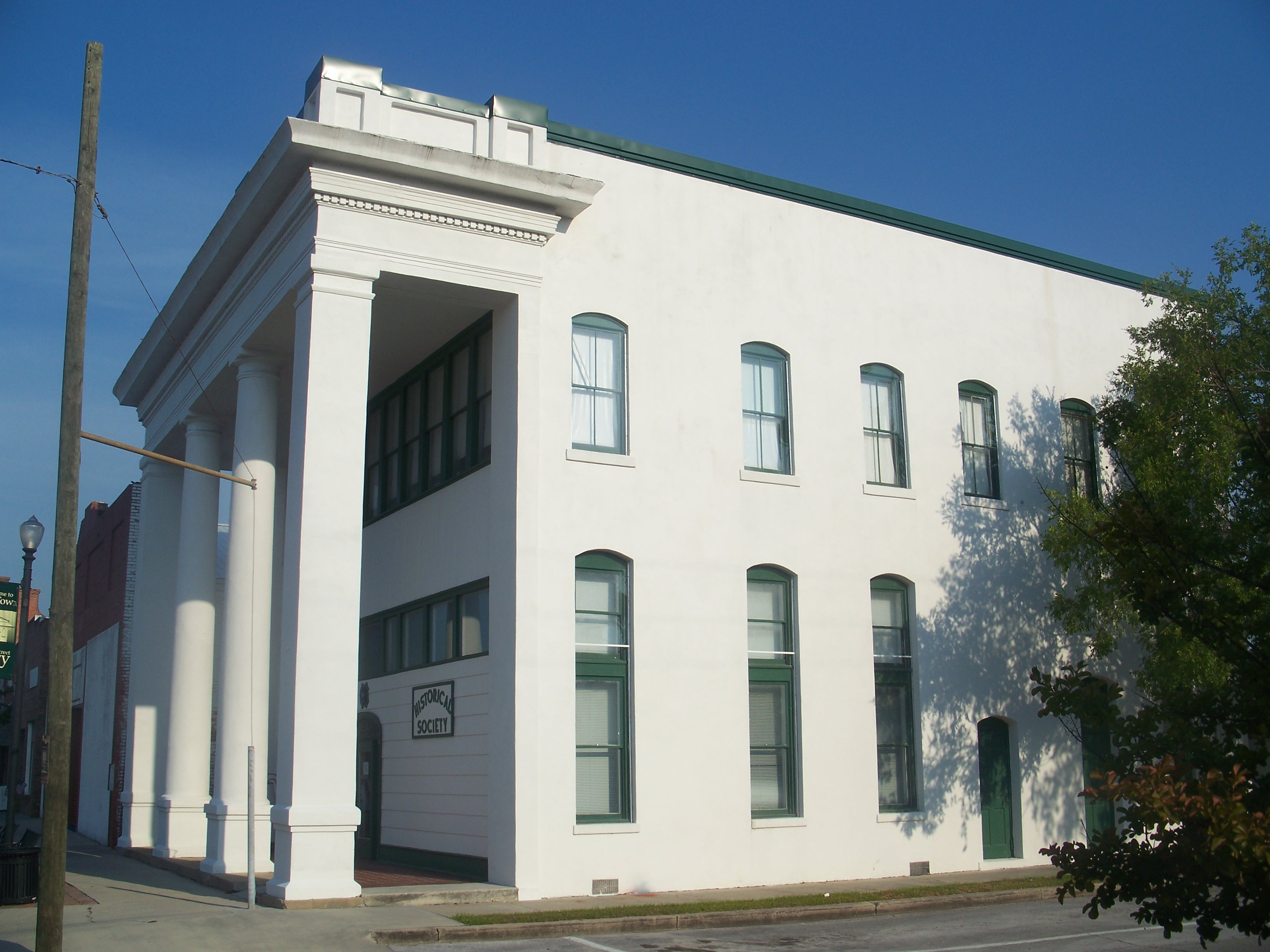
Side view of the Bank of Perry building

Taylor County Historical Society is a non-profit 501(c)(3) organization housed in the historic Bank of Perry building in Perry, Florida. The Taylor County Historical Society organization was established October 18, 1971, and houses a Historic Museum inside its building. The Museum is open Thursday afternoons to the public (call in advance). The organization has published historical documents such as "They Were Here" booklets focusing on people and families who have contributed and influenced the Taylor County communities. The society also provides local programs, local presenters, events, and activities for the public to help support its mission and share knowledge and history of the area.

The bank was built in 1903 and housed the First National Bank from 1909 to 1930. The upper floors were used by the law firm of W.B. Davis and Claude Pepper (who later became a U.S. Senator and member of the House of Representatives) during the 1920s. **There is currently building damage from the 2024 Hurricane season from both Hurricane Idalia and Helene which hit Taylor County head-on and devastated coastal and many inland areas. There are fundraising efforts underway to help restore the facility.

Recently, Linda and Kevin Randall who founded LPTV station 69 (W69AX) back in 1984 donated old tapes and records from their former station. A YouTube page was created to share some of these station videos and (more recently) resident's videos sharing 2024 hurricane devastation throughout the county. Also, the Taylor County Historical Society licensed a new non-profit LPFM radio station (WTYC-LP 97.1) with plans to operate in Perry Florida to support the Historical Society's mission of historic preservation and sharing history and culture from the past to the present. Station plans include volunteer and student opportunities and programming to include music, educational and history programs to the community from teachers, students, community volunteers, and members of the Historic Society.
