= Wimbish (surname) =

Wimbish is a surname, locational for someone from Wimbish. Notable people with the surname include:

- C. Bette Wimbish (1924–2009), African-American activist
- Doug Wimbish (born 1956), American bass player
