= Florida's 14th House of Representatives district =

American legislative district

Florida's 14th State House of Representatives district
Representative
Angie Nixon; D–Jacksonville
- Demographics: 41.0% White; 52.9% Black; 4.6% Hispanic; 1.8% Asian; 0.4% Native American; 0.1% Hawaiian/Pacific Islander; 1.5% Other
- Population (2010) • Voting age: 155,895; 114,782

Florida's 14th House district elects one member of the Florida House of Representatives. This district is located in Northeast Florida, and encompasses part of the First Coast, as well as part of the Jacksonville metropolitan area. The district covers northwestern Duval County, including much of Northside neighborhood and parts of Westside and Downtown Jacksonville. The largest city in the district is Jacksonville, though it only contains part of the city. As of the 2010 census, the district's population is 155,895. This district is majority-minority.

The district contains Jacksonville International Airport.

There was a vacancy in 1988 as the incumbent, Carl Ogden, resigned. Stephen Wise won a special election to fill the seat.

As of 2020, the district is represented by Angie Nixon.

== Representatives from 1967 to the present ==
Representatives by party affiliation
Party	Representatives
Democratic	10
Republican	1

#	Name	Term of service	Residence	Political party
1	Ken Smith	1967–1970	Perry	Democratic
2	Jack Burke Jr.	1970–1972	Perry	Democratic
3	Gene Hodges	1972–1982	Cedar Key	Democratic
4	Carl Ogden	1982–1988	Jacksonville	Democratic
	Vacant	1988		
5	Stephen Wise	1988–1992	Jacksonville	Republican
6	Tony Hill	1992–2000	Jacksonville	Democratic
7	Terry Fields	2000–2008	Jacksonville	Democratic
8	Mia Jones	2008–2016	Jacksonville	Democratic
9	Kimberly Daniels	2016–2020	Jacksonville	Democratic
10	Angie Nixon	2020–present	Jacksonville	Democratic

== See also ==
- Florida's 4th Senate district
- Florida's 6th Senate district
- Florida's 4th congressional district
- Florida's 5th congressional district
