= Jack Burke Jr. (politician) =

American politician (1931–2014)

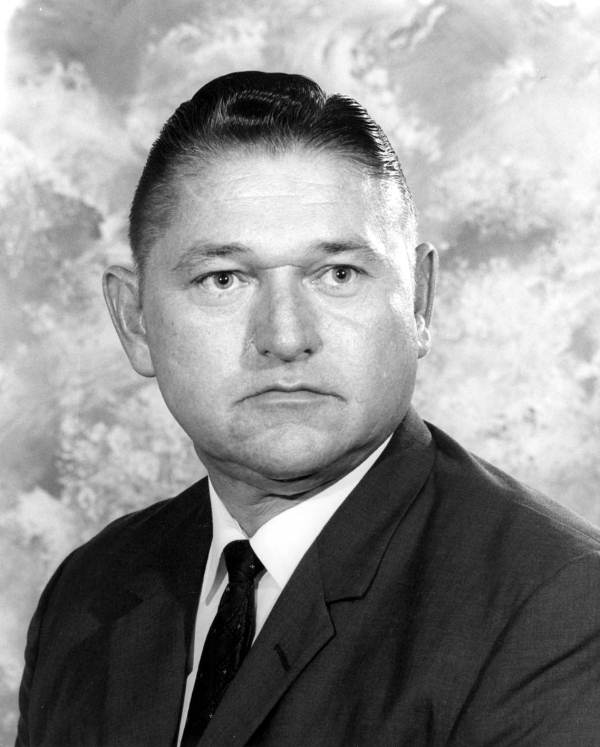
- Burke in 1970

Member of the Florida House of Representatives from the 14th district
- In office 1970–1972
- Preceded by: Ken Smith
- Succeeded by: Gene Hodges

Personal details
- Born: July 27, 1931 Greenville, U.S.
- Died: May 17, 2014 (aged 82)
- Party: Democratic
- Education: University of Florida

Jack Burke Jr. (July 27, 1931 – May 17, 2014) was an American politician. He served as a Democratic member for the 14th district of the Florida House of Representatives.

== Life and career ==
Burke was born in Greenville. He attended the University of Florida and served in the United States Army.

In 1970, Burke was elected to represent the 14th district of the Florida House of Representatives, succeeding Ken Smith. He served until 1972, when he was succeeded by Gene Hodges.

Burke died on May 17, 2014, at the age of 82.
