= John Paul Jackson =

Christian mystic

John Paul Jackson, Author, Speaker, Founder of Streams Ministries International

John Paul Jackson (July 30, 1950 - February 18, 2015) was an American author, teacher, conference speaker and founder of Streams Ministries International. Jackson often focused on supernatural topics like dreams, visions, and dream interpretation as found in the Bible. He developed a number of prophetic training courses. He was the host of Dreams & Mysteries with John Paul Jackson found on Daystar. He was also a recurring guest on many shows that include The 700 Club, Sid Roth's It's Supernatural, Benny Hinn's This Is Your Day program, and Joni Lamb's Table Talk among others. At one time he was a member of the controversial Kansas City Prophets, whose practice and doctrine came under fire in the 1980s and '90s. He was the founder of Streams Ministries International, a Christian ministry which deals especially with reforming the modern practice of prophecy and biblical dream interpretation. Jackson's career spanned more than 20 years. He served as the senior pastor of two churches, and he also served on the pastoral staff at the Vineyard Movement's Christian Fellowship in Anaheim, California (with John Wimber) and at the former Metro Christian Fellowship in Kansas City, Missouri (with Mike Bickle).

In 1997, Jackson launched The Streams Institute for Spiritual Development, a training program for mentoring those who claim to have revelatory gifts. By 2003, more than 12,000 students had enrolled in his courses, which have been held on six continents. In the summer of 2001, Jackson moved his headquarters to the Lake Sunapee region of New Hampshire. In 2008, Jackson relocated the ministry headquarters to the Dallas–Fort Worth metropolitan area.

== The Coming Perfect Storm ==
In what Jackson referred to as a revelation from the Lord, he released a statement in 2008 called The Coming Perfect Storm. In this statement, he spoke of a time coming to America and the world in which economic, military, religious, political, and geophysical issues and events would occur in a relatively small period of time to make up a perfect storm of calamity.

In the summer of 2009, Jackson was a guest on Sid Roth's It's Supernatural! radio and television program which aired on Trinity Broadcasting Network, The Inspiration Network, GOD TV, Daystar and other regional television stations. In the interview, Jackson describes in detail the events that were revealed to him. "I saw the year 2010 was going to be very difficult, especially as you get further into 2010. I saw the year, I kept hearing an angel saying in a deep loud voice, 'The woes of 2012. The woes of 2012. The woes of 2012.' I don’t know what those woes are, Sid. The angel did not tell me about those woes. But there was more emphasis on those woes than almost anything else that I was given."

In a 2011 web video series called "The Perfect Storm Revisited", Jackson elaborated more on his original message. In this video, he clarified his earlier statements regarding the year 2012. While stating he still did not know the details of what these "woes" were, he affirmed that he did not believe it would be anything on an apocalyptic or global destructive scale (making a reference to the film 2012).

The subject of The Perfect Storm has been discussed on multiple mainstream television programs, including Joni Table Talk, and Sid Roth's, It's Supernatural! John Paul Jackson also hosted a monthly live webinar through his Institute for Spiritual Development (ISD), where he often spoke on current and future events that he claimed supported his initial prophecy.

== Prophecy ==
In 1987, John Paul Jackson prophesied: “There’s going to be a fall of the stock market. There’s shaking, just as the Lord said, this spring.... 1988 will be a severe year for the stock market.” In fact, there was nothing that even remotely resembled a financial collapse in 1988. The market low was 1879.14, and the year closed at 2168.50, higher than it began."

In 1990, Jackson was accused of giving multiple false prophecies in a widely distributed 233-page paper entitled "Documentation of the Aberrant Practices and Teachings of Kansas City Fellowship" by Rev. Ernie Gruen. Upon investigation, his pastor, Mike Bickle, determined Jackson's false prophecies were so bad he was transferred to Anaheim for a period of instruction.

== Preparing for the Perfect Storm ==
Preparing for The Perfect Storm is a John Paul Jackson resource developed to assist with preparing for The Perfect Storm's five elements. It does so by referencing spiritual and practical material, while acting as a portal to news articles that support the prophecies that were first spoken in 2008.

The prophecies pertaining to the Perfect Storm have been broken down categorically, as have the news aggregated articles. Periodically, a member of Streams Ministries, which was founded by John Paul Jackson, will write an article under the heading, Symptoms of the Storm, which is intended to bring a compilation of articles together as evidence of The Perfect Storm.

He considered mediums and new age material an influence misaligned with scriptural truth. New age materials can create strongholds not of God, but the enemy in disguise preventing truth from being heard. God touched many lives as John Paul and his ministry team touched the lives of many new agers with God's message. Accordingly, we are to seek God out, like a King who seeks out what is best for his kingdom in regards to answers in our dreams.

== Declining health ==
Jackson was diagnosed with cancer in May 2014. Doctors found a huge cancerous growth in his leg. Surgery removed a 12-lb tumour and the operation required 175 stitches.

== Death ==
Jackson died on February 18, 2015, following post-cancer treatment complications which left him with pneumonia, pleurisy and secondary tumours on his lungs. He was 64.

== Publications ==
John Paul Jackson wrote and self-published several books, many of which have been translated in several languages. He also developed training resources and produced many CD and DVD series, among them:

=== Books ===
- John Paul Jackson, 7 Days Behind the Veil (Streams Publishing, 2006).
- John Paul Jackson, Breaking Free of Rejection (Streams Publishing, 2004).
- John Paul Jackson, I AM: 365 Names of God Book (Streams Publishing, 2002).
- John Paul Jackson, Unmasking the Jezebel Spirit (Streams Publishing, 2002).
- John Paul Jackson, Buying & selling the souls of our children : a closer look at Pokémon (Streams Publishing, 2000).
- John Paul Jackson, Needless Casualties of War (Streams Publishing, 1999).

=== CDs/DVDs ===
- John Paul Jackson, Power and Authority (2011) Audio CD
- John Paul Jackson, Keys to Receiving God's Justice (2009) DVD
- John Paul Jackson, The Kingdom of God in Turbulent Times (2009) DVD
- John Paul Jackson, The Coming Perfect Storm (2008) DVD
- John Paul Jackson, Understanding Dreams & Visions (2007) Audio CD

=== Courses authored and developed by John Paul Jackson ===
- John Paul Jackson, The Art of Hearing God (1997–2011)
- John Paul Jackson, Understanding Dreams and Visions (1997–2011)
- John Paul Jackson, Advanced Prophetic Ministry (1997–2011)
- John Paul Jackson, Advanced Workshop in Dreams and Visions (1997–2011)
