= Tony Hill (politician) =

American politician (born 1957)

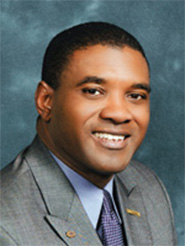

Member of the Florida Senate from the 1st district
- In office November 5, 2002 – October 1, 2011
- Preceded by: Betty Holzendorf (redistricting)
- Succeeded by: Audrey Gibson

Member of the Florida House of Representatives from the 14th district
- In office November 3, 1992 – November 7, 2000
- Preceded by: Betty Holzendorf (redistricting)
- Succeeded by: Terry Fields

Personal details
- Born: September 9, 1957 (age 68) Jacksonville, Florida
- Party: Democratic
- Spouse: Patricia
- Children: 4
- Education: Lincoln University; Edward Waters College; National Labor College (B.A.)
- Occupation: Longshoreman, labor organizer

Military service
- Allegiance: United States
- Branch/service: United States Army
- Years of service: 1977–1983

Anthony C. Hill Sr. (born September 9, 1957) is a Democratic politician from Florida who served as a member of the Florida House of Representatives from the 14th district from 1992 to 2000 and as a member of the Florida Senate from the 1st district from 2002 to 2011.

== Early life ==
Hill was born in Jacksonville, Florida, in 1957, and graduated from Jean Ribault High School. He attended Lincoln University for two years before serving in the U.S. Army from 1977 to 1983 in Baumholder, West Germany. Hill worked as a longshoreman at the Port of Jacksonville, and was involved in labor organizing, serving as the president of the local chapter of the Coalition of Black Trade Unionists, and later attending the National Labor College. In 1988, he was elected as a delegate for Jesse Jackson at the 1988 Democratic National Convention in Atlanta.

== Florida House of Representatives ==
In 1992, when State Representative Betty Holzendorf opted to successfully run for the Florida Senate rather than seek re-election, Hill ran to succeed her in the renumbered 14th district. In the Democratic primary, he faced attorney Charlie Adams, commercial fisherman Anita James, and counselor Levy Wilcox. Hill placed first in the primary, winning 42 percent of the vote, and advanced to a runoff election with James, who placed second with 30 percent. Hill defeated James in the runoff, receiving 59 percent of the vote. No other candidates filed for the race, and Hill won the general election by default.

Hill was re-elected without opposition in 1994, 1996, and 1998. He was term-limited in 2000.

In 2000, Hill and fellow State Representative Kendrick Meek staged a sit-in in Governor Jeb Bush's office suite to protest his "One Florida" plan, which would have ended affirmative action in state contracting and university admissions. Bush refused to abandon the plan, but agreed to allow community testimony on the proposal.

== Florida Senate ==
When State Senator Betty Holzendorf was term-limited in 2002, Hill ran to succeed her in the renumbered 1st district. He faced State Representative Denise Lee in the Democratic primary. Hill, who was the frontrunner for the seat, earned endorsements from the local Democratic establishment, including Holzendorf and Congresswoman Corinne Brown. He ultimately defeated Lee by a wide margin, winning 61 percent of the vote to her 39 percent. He faced no Republican opponents in the general election and was elected unopposed.

Hill was re-elected unopposed in 2004. in 2008, he was challenged by Louis J. Tart, the Constitution Party nominee. He defeated Tart in a landslide, winning re-election with 81 percent of the vote.

== Post-legislative career ==
In 2011, after the victory of Democrat Alvin Brown in the Jacksonville mayoral election, Hill resigned from the Senate to serve as Brown's director of federal policy.

Following Brown's defeat in 2015, Hill left the mayor's office. He considered running for Congress from the 5th district in 2016 if Congresswoman Corinne Brown declined to do so. However, Hill ultimately declined to run after Brown ran for re-election. Brown was defeated in the Democratic primary by former State Senator Al Lawson, who hired Hill to manage his office's community outreach from Jacksonville to Lake City.

== 2022 congressional campaign ==
In 2022, Hill announced that he would run for Congress in the redrawn 4th district. However, he was narrowly defeated in the Democratic primary by LaShonda Holloway, a former aide to Congresswoman Carrie Meek.
