= John Bevere =

American evangelist (born 1959)

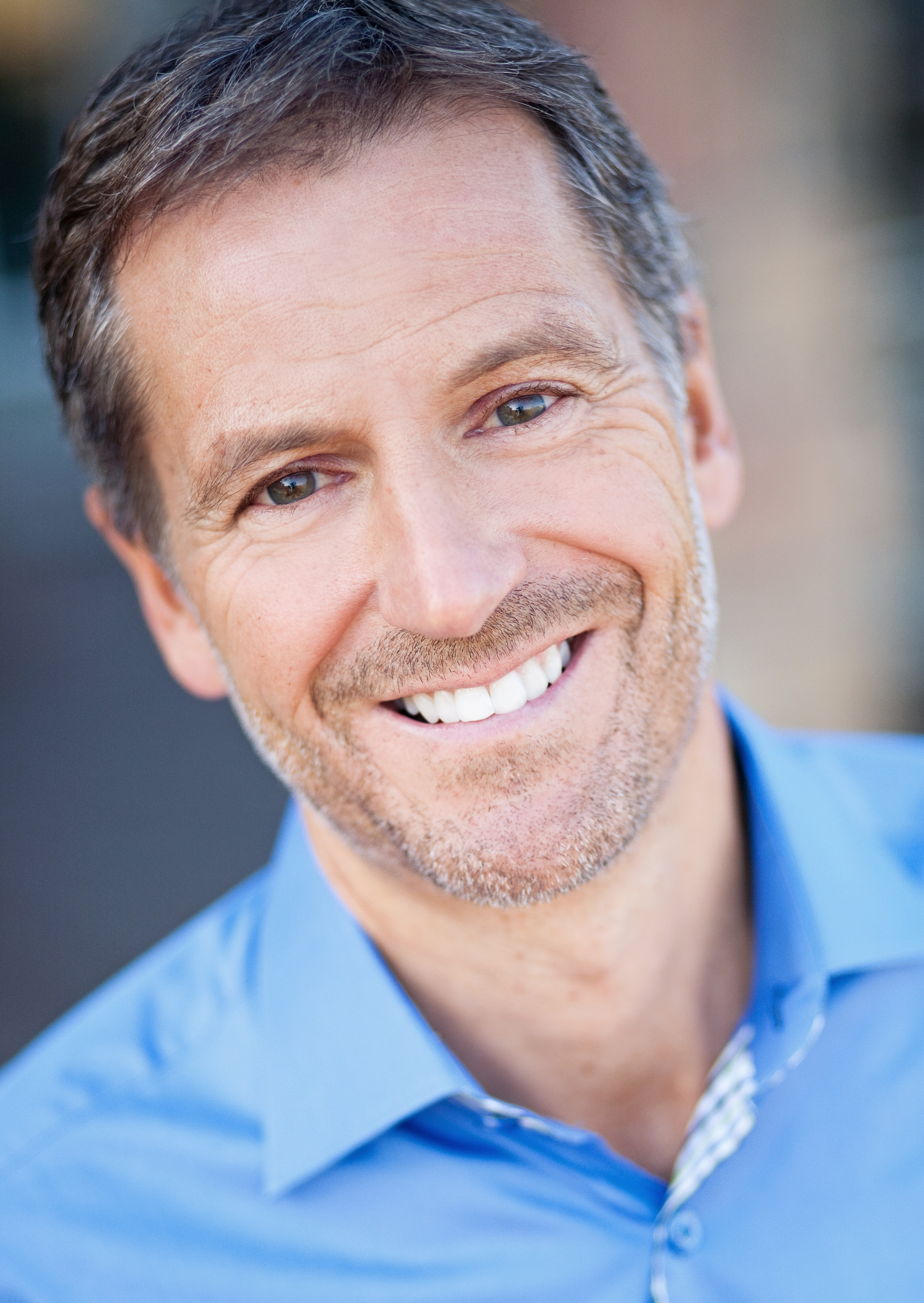
- John Bevere
- Born: John Bevere; June 2, 1959 (age 67)
- Education: Purdue University
- Spouse: Lisa Bevere

John Bevere (born June 2, 1959) is an American televangelist, evangelical Bible school teacher, and author.

== Personal life ==
Bevere worked in Orlando, Florida, during the 1980s and 1990s under the charismatic leader Benny Hinn, first as a youth pastor and later as Hinn's personal assistant.

He married Lisa Bevere in 1982.

== Views ==
On April 10, 2026 Bevere claimed the Antichrist is currently alive. He believes in the rapture.

== Career ==
Bevere is a Bible teacher at the international school of ministry. Bevere cofounded Messenger International with his wife Lisa Bevere. He has written 28 books.

== Criticism ==
Bevere's critics such as Robin A. Brace, accuse him of legalism, elements of the prosperity gospel, and proximity to the charismatic movement. They also argue that he does not sufficiently distance himself from his controversial former boss, Benny Hinn.

== Bibliography ==
- The bait of Satan Creation House (1994) ISBN 9780884193746
- The Fear Of The Lord: Discover the Key to Intimately Knowing God Charisma House (2010) ISBN 978-1599796130
- The Story Of Marriage Messenger International (2014) ISBN 978-1933185972
- Driven by Eternity: Make Your Life Count Today and Forever Messenger International (2016) ISBN 978-1937558055
- The awe of god: The Astounding Way a Healthy Fear of God transforms your life Thomas Nelson (2023) ISBN 978-1400337804
- You Are Called: Discover Your God-Given Gifts to Fulfill Your Purpose Thomas Nelson (2025) ISBN 978-1400350261
- The king is coming: it's time to prepare for the return of Christ Thomas Nelson (2026) ISBN 978-1400355679
- Killing Kryptonite: Destroy What Steals Your Strength Messenger international (2017) ISBN 978-1937558116
- Honor's Reward: How to Attract God's Favor and Blessing FaithWords (2007) ISBN 978-0446578837
- Victory in the Wilderness: Growing Strong in Dry Times PublishDrive (2025) ASIN B0FNQPTBD3
- Thus Saith The Lord: How to know when God is speaking to you through another Charisma House (1999) ASIN 0884195759
- A Heart Ablaze: Igniting a Passion for God Thomas Nelson (1999) ISBN 978-0785269908
- Under Cover: Why Your Response to Leadership Determines Your Future Harper Collins (2018) ISBN 978-0785218616
- The Promise of Protection Under His Authority Thomas Nelson (2001) ASIN B000H2N2CO
- Relentless: The Power You Need to Never Give Up WaterBrook (2011) ISBN 978-0307457776
- Drawing Near: A Life of Intimacy with God Thomas Nelson (2006) ISBN 978-1418513498
- X: Multiply Your God-Given Potential Messenger International (2020) ISBN 978-1937558246
- Good or God?: Why Good Without God Isn't Enough Messenger International (2015) ISBN 978-1933185965
- God, Where Are You?!: Finding Strength & Purpose in Your Wilderness Messenger International (2019) ISBN 978-1937558208
- Breaking Intimidation: Say "No" Without Feeling Guilty. Be Secure Without the Approval of Man. Charisma House (2013) ISBN 978-1599796147
- Everyday Courage: 50 Devotions to Build a Bold Faith Thomas Nelson (2024) ASIN B0BYYY9NT2
- The Holy Spirit: an introduction Whitaker House (2013) ISBN 978-1933185835
- How to Respond When You Feel Mistreated Thomas Nelson (2006) ISBN 978-0785260004
