= Christine Falling =

American serial killer

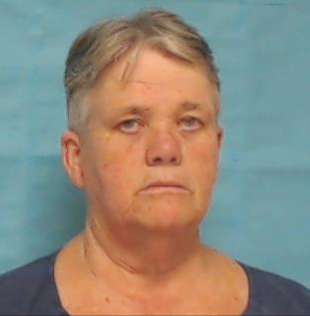
- FDOC mugshot
- Born: Christine Laverne Slaughter; March 12, 1963 (age 63); Perry, Florida, U.S.
- Conviction: First degree murder (3 counts)
- Penalty: Life imprisonment

Details
- Victims: 6
- Span of crimes: 1980–1982
- Country: United States
- State: Florida
- Imprisoned at: Lowell Correctional Institution, Ocala, Florida

Christine Laverne Falling (née Slaughter; born March 12, 1963) is an American serial killer, dubbed “Killer Babysitter” who killed the people in her care she babysat for.

== Life, childhood and youth ==
Christine Laverne Slaughter was the youngest child in a remorseless family; her father, Thomas, was 65 years old at the time of her birth, while her mother Ann was, at the age of 16, still a minor. The family was below the poverty line, and Christine did not receive the necessary early childhood support. Because of this, she was considered mentally challenged; she also suffered from epilepsy.

When her parents could no longer afford to support her, and also because of ongoing arguments between them, Christine spent some of her childhood and youth in various orphanages. She began killing small animals, especially domestic cats, at an early age. In order to test their "nine lives", as she later justified her actions, she often caused the animals to fall from heights.

In September 1977, the 14-year old Christine's parents forced her to marry a 20-year-old man, but the marriage, marked by almost daily quarrels and altercations, ended in divorce after only six weeks. After that, she had multiple hypochondriac-like episodes. In the next two years, she was to be hospitalized 50 times, but doctors were unable to find any treatable conditions. She suffered from hallucinations, complained of "red dots" that appeared before her eyes, and menstrual bleeding at irregular levels. At the age of 16, she was diagnosed as incapacitated on medical instructions.

In order to make money, Falling began working as a babysitter for neighbors and friends.

=== Murders ===
On February 25, 1980, 2-year old Cassidy Johnson was sent to a doctor's office in Blountstown, Florida. She was diagnosed with encephalitis, and on February 28, Cassidy died. An autopsy listed the cause of death as blunt force trauma to the skull. Falling, who had been babysitting for Johnson, said that Johnson had "passed out" and fallen out of her crib. The attending physician did not believe Falling and recommended in a note to police to investigate her. However, this note was lost, and the case was closed.

Shortly after Johnson's death, Falling moved to Lakeland, Florida. Two months later, in early summer 1980, 4-year old Jeffrey Davis died while under Falling's supervision. The autopsy pointed to myocarditis, a heart condition which is rarely fatal, as the cause of death. Three days later, his funeral took place, and Falling was asked to oversee Jeffrey's cousin, 2-year old Joseph Spring. He died a few hours later, doctors diagnosing a viral infection. Doctors also noted that the virus may have caused the death of Jeffrey as well.

In July 1981, Falling left Lakeland and returned to her hometown of Perry in Northern Florida. As few families wanted to entrust their children to her care, she began to work as a nursing assistant/housekeeper for seniors; 77-year old William Swindle died in his kitchen on the same day that Falling had started caring for him.

In the fall of the same year, the daughter of Falling's half-sister, 8-month old Jennifer Daniels, died. While Falling's half-sister had gone to the supermarket, she left her daughter with Falling for a few moments in the car, during which time the girl stopped breathing. Doctors suspected Sudden Infant Death Syndrome to be the cause of death.

The turning point of the enigmatic death streak was the death of 10-week-old Travis Coleman, who died on July 2, 1982, while Falling was taking care of him in Blountstown. At the autopsy, the doctors found internal injuries that only could have been caused by suffocation. When the police contacted Falling, she confessed to murdering three of the children because she had heard voices telling her "Kill the baby". She had suffocated the children with pillows and blankets.

Of these murders, Falling pleaded guilty to killing Johnson, Daniels and Coleman.

== Imprisonment ==
Falling was sentenced to life imprisonment in December 1982, and her confession prevented her from getting the death penalty.

After serving 25 years in prison, Falling was eligible for parole. Her application for parole was rejected by the parole review board in November 2017, and no one supporting Falling attended her parole hearing. She was scheduled for another hearing in 2024. Falling is imprisoned at the Lowell Correctional Institution in Ocala, Florida.

== Literature ==
- Michael Newton: The Encyclopedia of Serial Killers. 5. updated and expanded edition. Verlag für Sammler, Graz 2009, ISBN 978-3-85365-240-4, 534 page.
- Peter Murakami, Julia Murakami: Dictionary of Serial Killers. 450 case studied of a pathological killing type. Ullstein Tb, München 2000, ISBN 3-548-35935-3, 639 pages.

== See also ==
- List of serial killers in the United States
