= Stephen Mansfield =

American author (born 1958)

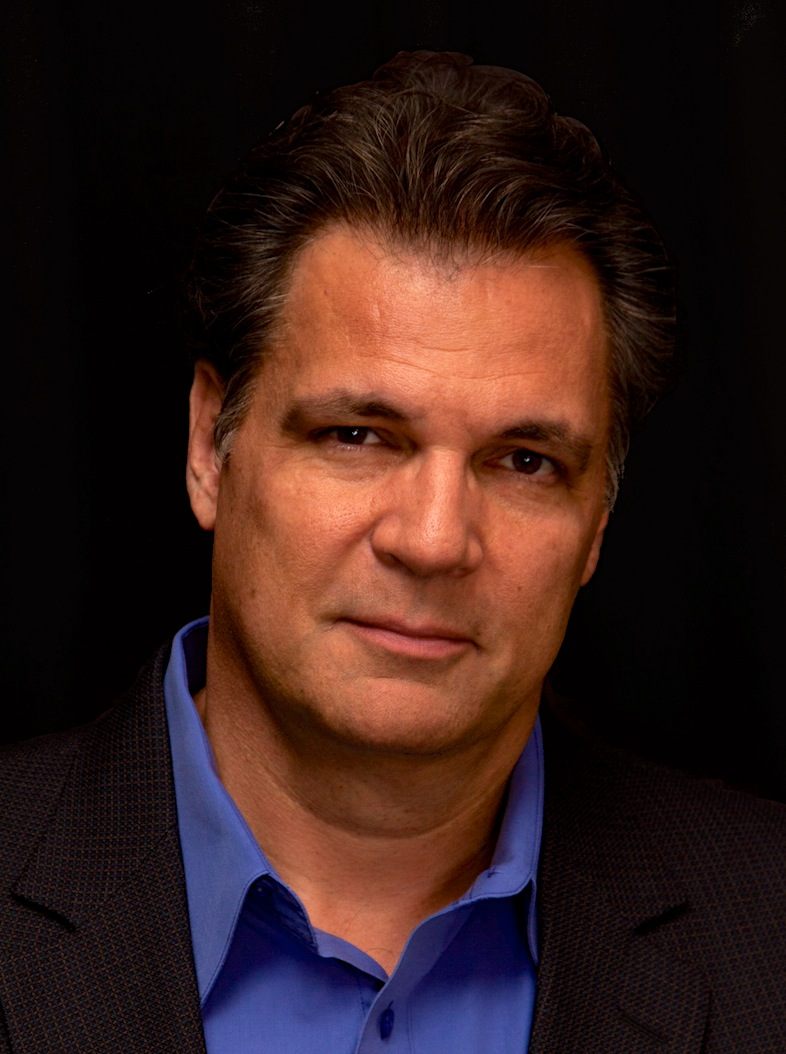
- Born: Stephen Lee Mansfield; 1958 (age 67–68)
- Education: Oral Roberts University (BA) Abilene Christian University (MA)
- Occupations: Author, speaker
- Spouse: Beverly Mansfield
- Website: http://stephenmansfield.tv/

Stephen Lee Mansfield (born 1958) is an American conservative author who writes about history, modern culture, religion and men's issues. His books have appeared on the New York Times best-seller list.

== Life and career ==
Mansfield was born in Columbus, Georgia, the son of a U.S. Army officer, Eldon L. Mansfield Jr. His family lived on military posts around the United States, though the majority of his early years were spent in Germany, particularly in Berlin during the years when that city was divided into communist and capitalist sectors.

Mansfield earned a bachelor's degree in history and philosophy from Oral Roberts University in 1981, a master's degree in history and public policy from Abilene Christian University, and a doctorate in history and literature from Whitefield Theological Seminary in 1996.

He was a pastor for 22 years, including 10 years at Belmont Church in Nashville, Tennessee, from 1992 to 2002, after which he began his formal writing career.

The Faith of George W. Bush, the first of his books to appear on the New York Times bestseller list, was published in 2003. The book was also a source for Oliver Stone's biographical film about George W. Bush, entitled W.

Mansfield followed his book about Bush with a number of biographies and cultural studies, authoring a total of more than 30 books.

He released The Miracle of the Kurds just as Kurdish troops were taking a stand against ISIS in the Middle East. The book has been named "Book of the Year" by Rudaw, the leading Kurdish news service. In 2016, Mansfield gave a TEDx talk entitled The Kurds: The World's Most Famous Unknown People. He continues to speak in the U.S. and abroad in support of the Kurdish cause.

Mansfield has also become an outspoken advocate for the cause of noble manhood. In 2013, he released Mansfield’s Book of Manly Men, which has inspired men's events in the U.S. and Asia.

In addition to his work as an author and speaker, he has founded The Mansfield Group, a consulting firm based in Washington, DC, and Chartwell Literary Group, a firm that manages and creates literary projects. He is married to songwriter and producer Beverly Darnall Mansfield. They make their home in both Nashville, Tennessee, and Washington, DC.

== Books by Stephen Mansfield ==
- —— (1995). Never Give In: The Extraordinary Character of Winston Churchill. Cumberland House Publishing. ISBN 978-1-888952-19-3. Gold Medallion Book Award Finalist
- ——; Grant, George (1997). Faithful Volunteers: The History of Religion in Tennessee. Cumberland House Publishing. ISBN 978-1-888952-14-8.
- —— (1999). Then Darkness Fled: The Liberating Philosophy of Booker T. Washington Cumberland House Publishing. Cumberland House. ISBN 978-1-58182-324-0.
- —— (2000). More Than Dates & Dead People. Highland House. ISBN 1-58182-118-2.
- —— (2001). Forgotten Founding Father: The Heroic Legacy of George Whitefield. Cumberland House Publishing. ISBN 978-1-58182-165-9.
- ——; Bartholomew, Sam (2001). American Destiny. American Destiny Press. ISBN 0-9704986-0-8.
- —— (2003). The Faith of George W. Bush. Charisma House. ISBN 978-1-59185-242-1. New York Times Bestseller, Audie Award Finalist, Retailers Choice Award Winner
- —— (2004). Character and Greatness of Winston Churchill: Hero in a Time of Crisis. Cumberland House Publishing. ISBN 978-1-63026-290-7.
- —— (2005). Derek Prince: A Biography. Charisma House. ISBN 978-1-59185-794-5.
- —— (2005). The Faith of the American Soldier. Frontline. ISBN 978-1-59185-662-7.
- —— (2005). Pope Benedict XVI: His Life and Mission. Tarcher. ISBN 978-1-58542-450-4.
- Delay, Tom; with Mansfield, Stephen (2007). No Retreat, No Surrender: One American's Fight. Sentinel HC. ISBN 978-1-59523-034-8.
- —— (2006). American Heroes. Thomas Nelson. ISBN 978-1404104167.
- —— (2007). Ten Tortured Words. Thomas Nelson. ISBN 978-1-59555-084-2.
- —— (2008). The Faith of Barack Obama. Thomas Nelson. ISBN 978-1-59555-250-1.
- ——; Holland, David (2009). Paul Harvey's America. Tyndale House. ISBN 978-1-4143-3450-9. 2010 Retailers Choice Award Winner
- —— (2009). The Search for God and Guinness. Thomas Nelson. ISBN 978-1-59555-269-3.
- —— (2010). ReChurch: Healing Your Way Back to the People of God. BarnaBooks. ISBN 978-1-4143-3328-1.
- —— (2010). Welcome Home. Zondervan. ISBN 978-0-31051-972-0.
- ——; Holland, David (2010). The Faith and Values of Sarah Palin. Charisma House. ISBN 978-1-61638-164-6.
- —— (2011). Where Has Oprah Taken Us? The Religious Influence of the World's Most Famous Woman. Thomas Nelson. ISBN 978-1-59555-308-9.
- —— (2012). The Mormonizing of America. Worthy Publishing. ISBN 978-1-61795-078-0.
- —— (2012). Lincoln's Battle With God. Thomas Nelson. ISBN 978-1-59555-309-6.
- —— (2013). Killing Jesus. Worthy Publishing. ISBN 978-1-61795-187-9.
- —— (2013). Mansfield's Book of Manly Men: An Utterly Invigorating Guide to Being Your Most Masculine Self. Thomas Nelson. ISBN 978-1-59555-373-7.
- —— (2014). The Miracle of the Kurds: A Remarkable Story of Hope Reborn in Northern Iraq. Worthy Publishing. ISBN 978-1-61795-079-7.
- —— (2016). Ask the Question: Why We Must Demand Religious Clarity from our Presidential Candidates. Baker Books. ISBN 978-0-8010-1887-9.
- —— (2016). Building Your Band of Brothers. Blackwatch Digital. ISBN 978-0-9977647-5-8.
- —— (2017). Choosing Donald Trump: God, Anger, Hope, and Why Christian Conservatives Supported Him. Baker Books. ISBN 978-0-8010-0733-0.
- —— (2017). Ten Signs of a Leadership Crash. Blackwatch Digital. ISBN 978-0-9977647-3-4.
- —— (2020). El Libro de Hombres. Harper Collins. ISBN 978-1400221387.
- —— (2020). Men on Fire. Baker Books. ISBN 978-0801007163.
