= C. Bette Wimbish =

American politician

- In office 1969–1973

Personal details
- Born: March 24, 1924 Perry, Florida
- Died: November 30, 2009 (aged 85) St. Petersburg, Florida
- Spouse: Ralph Wimbish
- Education: Florida A&M University (Law)

C. Bette Wimbish (March 24, 1924 – November 30, 2009) was one of the leading African-American woman activists in Florida promoting the desegregation of schools and civil equality. She was most commonly known as a civil rights activist, a politician, and the first African American on the St. Petersburg, Florida city council. As well as being the first African-American to hold elected office in the Tampa Bay area in the 20th-century, Wimbish was also the first black female lawyer in Pinellas County, Florida. She was the wife of Ralph Wimbish and the mother of three children.

== Early life and education ==
C. Bette Wimbish was born Carrie Elizabeth Davis in Perry, Florida, to Ola Mae and Tom Davis. Her mother was a housekeeper; her father, Tom, had alcoholism and left soon after his daughter's birth. She graduated from Booker T Washington High School in Tampa, Florida, and soon applied for school at University of Pennsylvania. However, Wimbish was turned down as a result of her race. Discouraged but determined, Wimbish began working towards a degree at Florida Agricultural and Mechanical College for Negroes, which is now known as Florida A&M. She began college at the age of 16 with the intention of becoming a doctor. While attending school, she met Ralph Wimbish, another aspiring physician. They married on November 12, 1944. In the same year, she received her bachelor's degree from Florida A&M. She began her career as a physical education teacher, while her husband pursued studies in medicine at Meharry Medical College in Nashville.

The young couple suffered discrimination and harassment as a result of their civil rights efforts. They attempted to build a house in Tampa in a predominantly white area on 22nd street in 1948. In moving to this area, they hoped to find a suitable place to raise their daughter; however, the house burned to the ground the night before the family moved in. The cause of the fire was never discovered although it is commonly believed to have been the result of an attack by the Ku Klux Klan. Subsequently, the family moved to St. Petersburg, in 1953. Dr. Ralph Wimbish set up a medical office on 16th Street near the current Tropicana Field.

Later in her life, she changed her ambitions from pursuing a medical career to a new passion for law. She applied to Stetson Law School but was turned down due to the controversies arising from her early civil rights battles. She then applied to Florida A&M's law school and graduated in just two years. She passed the bar exam in the upper third but still had difficulties finding work due to widespread discrimination in the South.

== Political activism ==
When Ralph Wimbish was elected branch president of the Saint Petersburg NAACP in 1959, the couple became involved in the desegregation of schools. Six years after the Brown Decision, St. Petersburg students were still attending racially separate schools. Instead of complying to desegregate the schools, the Pinellas County Board of Public Instruction built new segregated schools that were supposed to reinforce the idea of "separate but equal". However, the county rejected black applicants to these new all-white institutions. As a result, the Wimbishes developed a new political approach to school desegregation. Since they could not force the school board to comply with the Brown Decision, they attempted to first integrate the school board.

In 1960, C. Bette Wimbish decided to run for an at-large seat on the Pinellas County Board of Public Instruction. A black candidate had never run for a countywide political office in Pinellas at the time. With her degree from Florida A&M and her experience educating in the Hillsborough County School System, Wimbish was well-qualified to challenge the white hegemony in politics. Although Wimbish knew she had little chance of winning, she held high hopes of being heard. Her platform centered on school improvements rather than direct references to race. The decision to run was particularly fueled by the district's solution to the overcrowding of black high schools - not integration, but rather the creation of a new black high school in a small area of South Saint Petersburg. Although she did not win the election, she received 10,000 votes in an area with only 3,800 blacks.

Wimbish continued to stay involved in numerous attempts at desegregation of schools and lunch counters. Bette was involved in two days of sit-ins in early March 1960. Wimbish and Gibbs Jr. College student Theodore Floyd sat in at the William Henry lunch counter with the hopes of encouraging city leader to form biracial committees. However, the black activists were refused service and the lunch counters immediately closed to avoid potential controversies. In Florida, proprietors operating public accommodations were given the right to serve anyone that they pleased. No local or state laws existed that specifically prevented white establishments from serving blacks.(7) Although there were no direct improvements, boycotts and other protests finally led to the peaceful desegregation of many of Saint Petersburg's lunch counters by early 1961. The Wimbishes continued to fight against overcrowded black facilities and the district's lack of solutions to problems facing black students.

Desegregation of the schools did not begin until September 1962, when black children were being integrated in small numbers into predominately white schools. Blacks continued to receive little cooperation from the district and did not see any real progress until the NAACP took the issue through the court system. As a result of the case, 6700 black children attended desegregated schools during the 1966-67 term, as opposed to 739 students two years before. Businesses also began to see some desegregation. During the Christmas season of 1960, Bette and her husband boycotted local businesses and encouraged residents to buy from catalogs instead of city's segregated stores. As a result, Governor LeRoy Collins encouraged biracial committees to find solutions. After some time, local business leaders and the St Petersburg Times realized that a massive resistance movement against desegregation would jeopardize Pinellas County's drawing power as a popular tourist destination.

In addition to their political efforts to end discrimination, the Wimbishes opened their home on 15th Avenue S to visiting black athletes and entertainers who could not get hotel rooms due to segregation laws. Over the 1950s and early 1960s, the family housed famous people including musicians such as Lionel Hampton, Cab Calloway and Dizzy Gillespie and athletes Jesse Owens, Elston Howard and Althea Gibson. However, in 1961, her husband told the New York Yankees and St. Louis Cardinals that he would no longer find separate housing for black players. The Yankees moved the team to Fort Lauderdale without a fuss. Saint Petersburg locals responded by burning a cross in the Wimbishes yard, in attempts to "send a message" to Bette and her husband. The Wimbish family also housed the Freedom Riders during their visit in 1961. When the student activists began to ride South to fight the segregated interstate bus services, the Riders made several trips to the home of Dr. and Mrs. Wimbish for rest and recreation. They rode on segregated buses of the city of Saint Petersburg without incident unlike their experiences in Alabama and Mississippi.

== Life after law school ==
At the age of 45, Bette's husband Ralph died from a heart attack during her last two weeks of law school at Florida A&M. She then returned to Saint Petersburg and joined Minnis and Williams Law Firm in 1968 to specialize in family law. Eventually, she turned her husband's medical office into her own law office. She then began to help black sanitation workers fight against unequal pay. Although unsuccessful, her stubbornness and determination inspired many people of the community to take part in the movement. The strike also gave her a platform to run for the City Council in the spring of 1969.

As a result, Wimbish was elected to the City Council in 1969. She defeated the incumbent, Martin Murray, by promoting a responsive government enabling equal-opportunity hiring practices for minorities. She then served as vice-mayor from 1971 until 1973. As vice-mayor she was able to restore the cities water system and institute one of the nation's first mandatory seat belt laws. She also fought unsuccessfully to have black real-estate owners compensated for past discrimination.

In 1975, Bette was appointed assistant secretary of commerce by governor Reuben Askew and moved back to Tallahassee, becoming the second-highest-ranking woman in state government. She was then appointed deputy secretary of commerce. After losing her Tallahassee district seat in the state legislature in 1982, she returned to Saint Petersburg to take on Bill Young Bill Young for Congress in 1988.

She campaigned issues of human rights and equality in many areas including women's rights, social stratification, and educational justice. She ran unsuccessful campaigns for the state Senate and Congress centering her ideas around environmental crisis and drug education. Wimbish stressed the toxic effects of contaminated ground water, acid rain, and the decreasing ozone layer. She also campaigned to establish day care for working parents and for equal opportunities for students to participate in loan programs. Although she received 65,000 votes, she did not win the election.

Bette's mother died in 1991, and her son died 14 months later at the age of 32. As a result, she took a job as local counsel for the Florida Department of Social Services while arbitrating labor law cases for the federal government before her retirement in 2003.

== Death and legacy ==
Wimbish died on November 30, 2009, at the age of 85. She was a celebrated member of the community. She was a member of numerous organizations including: the Florida Bar Association, the Florida Government Bar Association, American Bar Association, and the National Bar Association, National Council of Negro Women, National Association for the Advancement of Colored People, and National Urban League. She was recognized in Who's Who Among Black Americans, Who's Who in American Politics, Florida Women of Distinction, and Outstanding Women of Florida.
