= Tim Donoho =

American entrepreneur and writer (1955–2022)

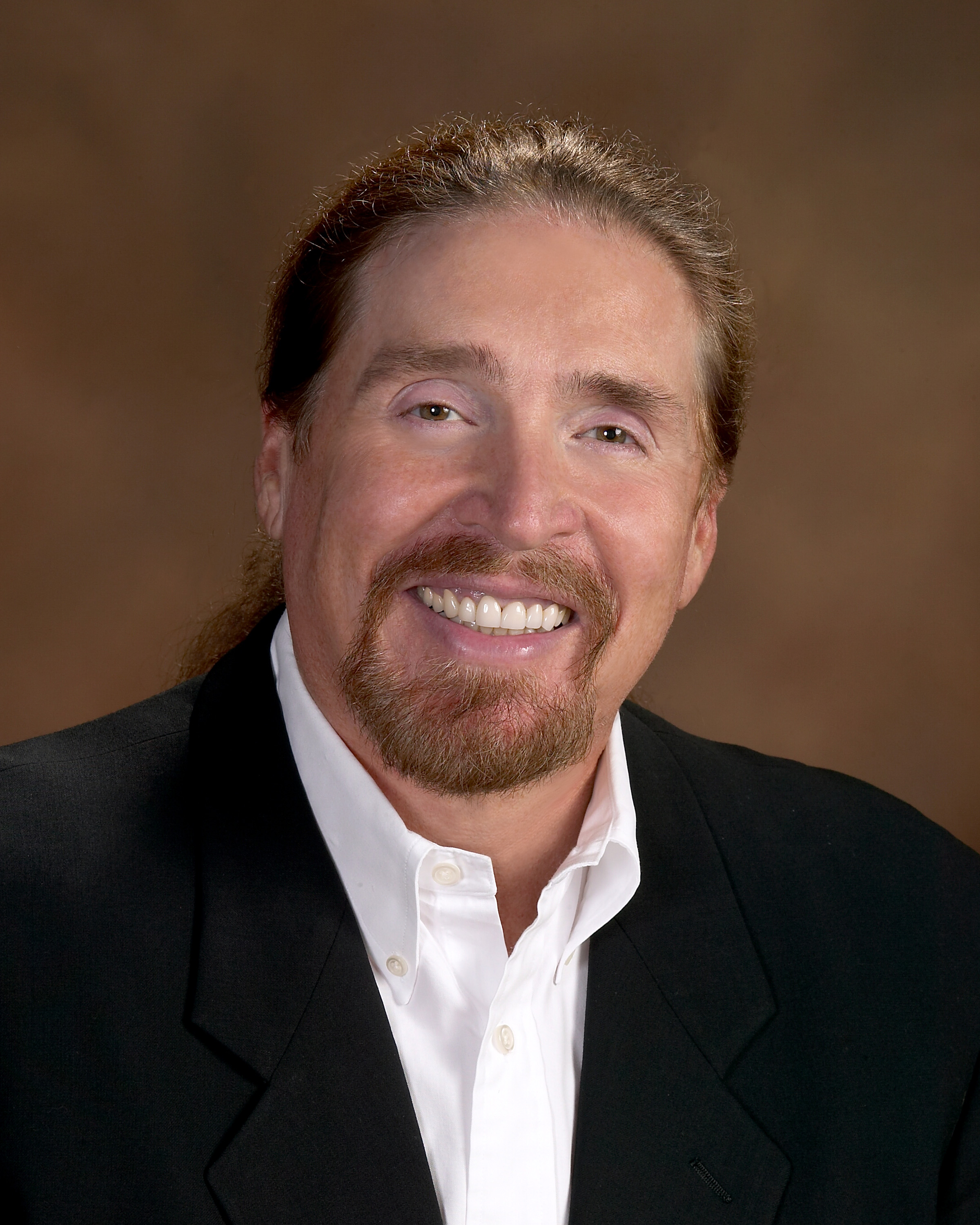
- Born: 25 September 1955; St Louis, Missouri, United States
- Died: 24 August 2022 (aged 66)
- Education: Columbia College
- Occupations: Entrepreneur; writer

Timothy Mark Donoho (25 September 1955 – 24 August 2022) was an American entrepreneur, author, and philanthropist. He was the founder of Advantage Dental Health Plans which would eventually be acquired by MetLife and in this capacity served as the Chairman of the National Association of Dental Plans. He was also the publisher of Prime Years News Magazine, which was Florida's largest senior living magazine.

== Biography ==
Donoho was born in St. Louis, Missouri and resided in the South Florida area. After leaving the United States Army in 1977 he joined Pyramid Life Insurance where he rose to the role of National Director of Marketing. In 1984 he left to form Advantage Dental Health Plans.

== Business ventures ==
Donoho founded Advantage Dental Health Plans in 1984. The company was a managed care PPO and was sold in 1996 to Safeguard who were later acquired by MetLife. In his capacity as CEO of Advantage Dental he served as chairman of the board of directors of the National Association of Dental Plans (NADP). In his memoir Donoho related how as chairman he lobbied on behalf of the NADP and they donated $500 each to 10 Senators and House members and was able to secure insertion of the exact language the NADP desired for the Health Insurance Portability and Accountability Act. He said this experience influenced his view of the independence of government from that point on.

== Film the Bible ==
In 1999 Donoho founded Film the Bible, a not-for-profit ministry with the intention of raising 660 million dollars to dramatize the entirety of the Bible as CGI technology matured. For this project he received endorsements from Congressman JC Watts, D. James Kennedy, and Bill Bright.

== Philanthropy ==
After the 2010 Haiti earthquake Donoho chartered a plane, filled it with relief supplies and delivered it to the capital of Port-au-Prince. He served on the South Florida board of trustees for the National Multiple Sclerosis Society.

== Bibliography ==
- Arguing With God (2008)
- My Utmost: A Memoir (2015)
