= Kimberly Daniels =

American minister/politician

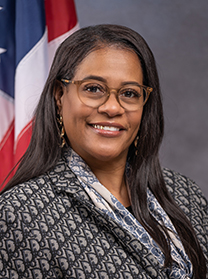

Member of the Florida House of Representatives from the 14th district
- Incumbent
- Assumed office November 8, 2022
- Preceded by: Angie Nixon
- In office November 8, 2016 – November 3, 2020
- Preceded by: Mia Jones
- Succeeded by: Angie Nixon

Personal details
- Party: Democratic
- Spouse: Ardell Daniels (m. 1997; div. 2016)
- Children: 4
- Education: Florida State University (BA); Jacksonville Theological Seminary (Master's, Doctorate)
- Profession: Minister

Kimberly Daniels (born June 12, 1961) is an American minister, religious author, and politician. Daniels is a member of the Democratic Party in the Florida House of Representatives, representing House District 14 (part of Duval County).

Daniels began her political career as an at-large member of the Jacksonville City Council. She represented House District 14 in the Florida House of Representatives from 2016 to 2020 before being defeated in the Democratic primary in 2020 by Angie Nixon. Daniels was elected to represent Florida House District 14 again in 2022, and was reelected in 2024.

== Personal life ==
Daniels is a graduate of Florida State University where she obtained a bachelor's degree in criminology. Daniels has a master's degree in Christian education and a doctorate in Christian counseling from the not regionally accredited Jacksonville Theological Seminary. Daniels' book Breaking the Power of Familiar Spirits is now a class textbook at JTS.

In 2011 Daniels was elected to the Jacksonville City Council as an at-large member. On March 9, 2015, then-city councilwoman Daniels was involved in a profanity-laced squabble with council candidate Sirretta Williams, also a local minister. She lost her bid for re-election in 2015, 55% to 45%.

Daniels and her husband Ardell divorced in 2015–2016.

== Florida House of Representatives ==
Daniels was first nominated to the House in 2016 (incumbent Mia Jones could not run due to term limits), winning the Democratic nomination with 6781 votes (35.99% of the vote) in the primary election, defeating attorney Leslie Jean-Bart (31.32%) and three other candidates. In the general election she easily defeated Republican nominee Christian Whitfield, taking just over two-thirds of the vote.

Florida HD 14 map (2012 redistricting)

In March 2017, it was reported that Daniels was under investigation by the Florida Elections Commission after it found probable cause that she used campaign funds for personal expenses and later falsely reported information on finance reports.

In early 2018, Daniels introduced HB 839, a bill that requires public schools to display the motto "In God We Trust" in a conspicuous place. On Tuesday, January 23, 2018, the bill received unanimous approval from the House PreK-12 Innovation Subcommittee. Later, in a vote on February 21, 2018, the bill passed 97 to 10 in the House. The measure was eventually adopted as law in March 2019 as part of an education bill.

On August 28, 2018, Daniels defeated educator Paula Wright in the Democratic primary for her seat. She did not have a Republican opponent, and conspicuously drew campaign support from Republican officeholders and donors.

In early 2019, Daniels sponsored legislation to require schools to teach courses on the Bible. The Florida House PreK-12 Quality Subcommittee approved the measure.

Daniels championed a $1 million contract for SCLC World Wide, run by Gary Johnson. In the summer of 2019, Florida Department of Juvenile Justice sued SCLC World Wide for not delivering on its commitments. The following day, Daniels was sued by a former staffer, Karen Riggien, who claimed to have been wrongfully fired in February 2018 in connection with interactions with Gary Johnson, a man Riggien described as Daniels' boyfriend.

On July 23, 2019, the Freedom from Religion Foundation wrote to Representative Daniels requesting that she stop blocking users on Facebook.

On August 18, 2020, Daniels lost renomination in the Democratic primary election to Angie Nixon.

== False disclosures and ethical investigations ==
In 2017, Daniels was accused of illegally using campaign funds for personal expenses in 2015. An investigation was launched after a complaint was filed that year about a $4,000 expenditure listed on her campaign finance report. Daniels agreed to pay a $1,500 fine related to the 2015 Election Commission complaint.

Again, in 2019, Daniels agreed to admit that she filed inaccurate financial disclosures in 2012, 2013 and 2014.

== Authored works ==
- Against All Odds. Spread the Word Publishing. 2000. ISBN 978-1929097050.
- Clean House, Strong House: A Practical Guide to Understanding Spiritual Warfare, Demonic Strongholds and Deliverance. Charisma House. 2003. ISBN 978-0884199649.
- Delivered To Destiny: From Crack Addict to the Military's Fastest Female Sprinter to Pastoring a Diverse and Multicultural Church, Kim's Story of Hope is for Everyone. Charisma House. 2005. ISBN 9781591856146.
- Give It Back!: God's Weapons for Turning Evil to Good. Charisma House. 2006. ISBN 978-1599790572.
- Inside Out: Dump the Baggage and Discover Hope through Inner Healing. Charisma House. 2008. ISBN 978-1599792798.
- Prayers That Bring Change: Power-Filled Prayers that Give Hope, Heal Relationships, Bring Financial Freedom and More!. Charisma House. 2010. ISBN 978-1599797519.
- Spiritual Housekeeping: Sweep Your Life Free from Demonic Strongholds and Satanic Oppression. Charisma House. 2011. ISBN 978-1616382384.
- Spiritual Boot Camp: Basic Training and Supernatural Strategies for Combat Readiness. Charisma House. 2012. ISBN 978-1616387136.
- The Demon Dictionary Volume One: Know Your Enemy. Learn His Strategies. Defeat Him! (Volume 1). Charisma House. 2013. ISBN 978-1621363002.
- The Demon Dictionary Volume Two: An Exposé on Cultural Practices, Symbols, Myths, and the Luciferian Doctrine (Volume 2). Charisma House. 2014. ISBN 978-1621365563.
- From a Mess to a Miracle: Experiencing True Transformation in Christ. Charisma House. 2014. ISBN 978-1621369738.
- Selah: Pause and Think on This: Daily Insights for Total Breakthrough. Charisma House. 2017. ISBN 978-1629989693.
- Breaking the Power of Familiar Spirits: How to Deal with Demonic Conspiracies. Charisma House. 2018. ISBN 978-1629995298.

== See also ==
- Spiritual warfare
- Demonic strongholds
