= O. W. Jones =

American politician

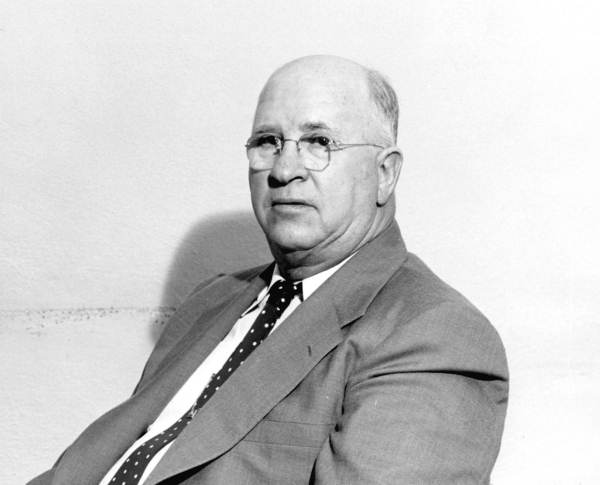

Member of the Florida House of Representatives for Taylor County
- In office 1955–1961
- Preceded by: Gus J. Dekle
- Succeeded by: Ken Smith

Personal details
- Born: Oliver Wendell Jones; September 3, 1897 Kentucky, U.S.
- Died: August 6, 1975 (aged 77) Leon County, Florida, U.S.
- Party: Democratic

Oliver Wendell Jones (September 3, 1897 – August 6, 1975) was a politician in the state of Florida. Born in western Kentucky, Jones served in the Florida House of Representatives from 1955 to 1961 as a Democrat, representing Taylor County.
