= Mia Jones =

American politician

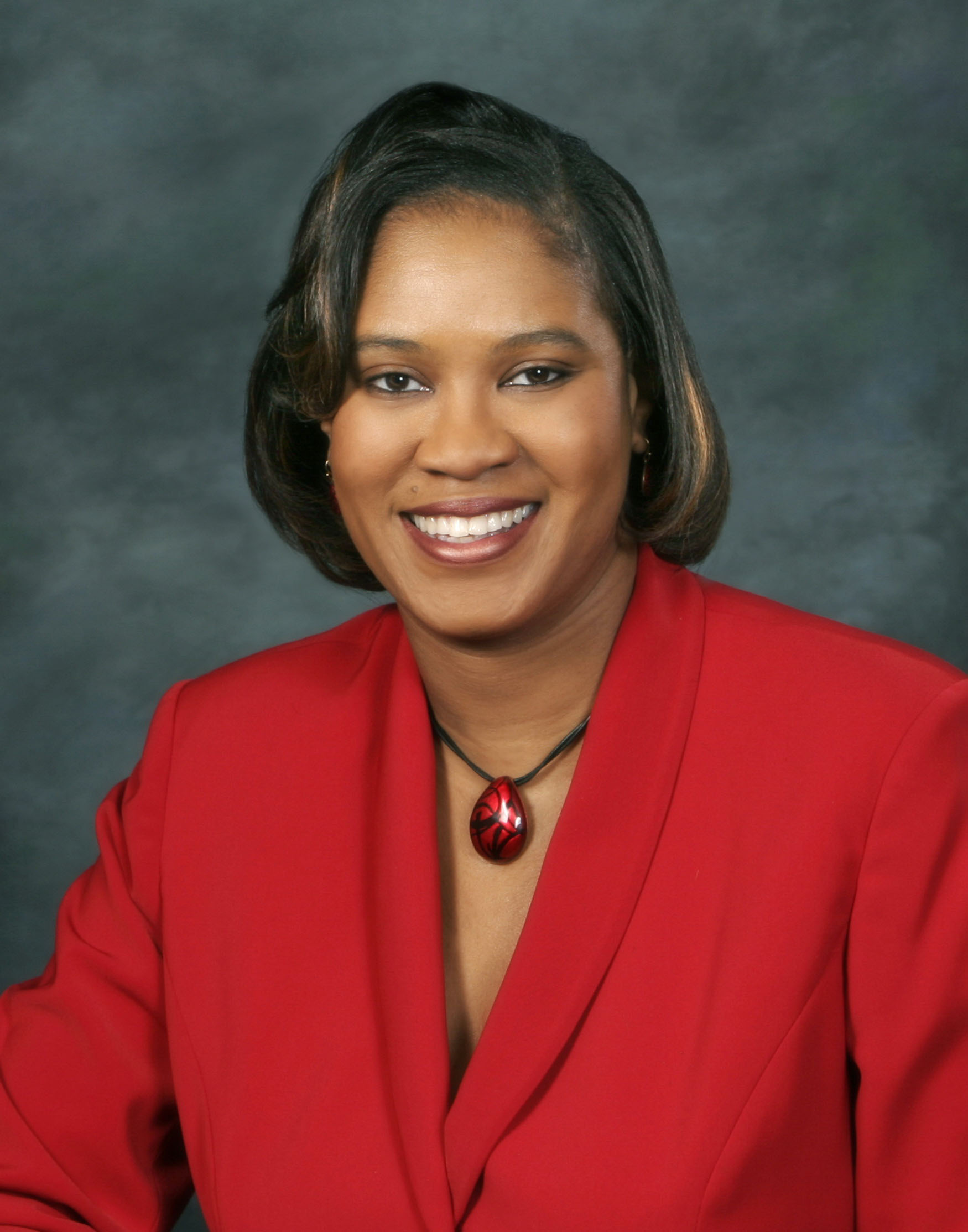

Member of the Florida House of Representatives from the 14th district
- In office November 4, 2008 – November 8, 2016
- Preceded by: Terry Fields
- Succeeded by: Kimberly Daniels

Personal details
- Born: April 26, 1968 (age 58) Jacksonville, Florida, U.S.
- Party: Democratic
- Spouse: George Davis
- Education: Florida A&M University (BS, MBA)

Mia Jones (born April 26, 1968) is a former Democratic member of the Florida House of Representatives, representing the 14th District, which includes parts of downtown Jacksonville in northern Duval County, from 2008 to 2016.

== History ==
Jones was born in Jacksonville, and attended Florida A&M University, where she graduated with a degree in accounting in 1991 and then a Master of Business Administration in 1992. After graduation, she worked under Ed Austin, the Mayor of Jacksonville, in the Office of Equal Employment from 1992 to 1995. Jones also worked for Duval County Public Schools as the Supervisor of Affirmative Action and the Director of Minority Business Affairs. She served on the Jacksonville City Council from 2003 to 2008 where she served on the Public Health & Safety Committee, Land Use & Zoning Committee, Recreation & Community Development Committee, Personnel Committee, City Council's Task Force on Affordable & Low Income Housing, Zoning Code Rewrite Special Committee and Liaison to the Water & Sewer Expansion Authority.

== Florida House of Representatives ==
In 2008, following the inability of State Representative Terry Fields to seek re-election due to term limits, Jones ran to succeed him in the Democratic primary in the 14th District, which included northern Duval County. She ran against fellow City Councilwoman Pat Lockett-Felder, whom she defeated with 54% of the vote. In the general election, Jones defeated the Republican nominee, Sarah Lovett, with 74% of the vote. She was re-elected without opposition in 2010.

Following the reconfiguration of Florida House districts in 2012, Jones ran for re-election in the 14th District, which included most of the territory that she had previously represented. She won the nomination of her party uncontested, and in the general election, defeated Libertarian candidate Jonathan Loesche in a landslide, winning 79% of the vote. In 2014, Jones was re-elected without opposition to her fourth and final term in the House.

Florida HD 14 map (2012 redistricting)

While serving in the legislature, Jones ran against State Representative Darryl Rouson of St. Petersburg for the position of Democratic floor leader for the 2014-2016 term. In a closely contested vote, she narrowly lost to Rouson, receiving the votes of 21 of her colleagues to Rouson's 23. Just months later, Rouson was ousted as floor leader by a majority vote of the Democratic caucus. Jones was mentioned as a potential candidate to succeed him, but she ultimately declined to run. During the debate over expanding Medicaid as provided for under the Patient Protection and Affordable Care Act, Jones proposed a plan that "would have implemented Medicaid expansion as offered under the Affordable Care Act," which "gave Democrats a public stage to extol the virtues of Medicaid expansion, which would bring $51 billion in federal money over the next decade and cost the state $3.5 billion over that time," though the plan ultimately failed. When the legislature passed legislation that aimed to speed up executions of prisoners on death row, Jones strongly opposed the legislation because many death row inmates have been exonerated, noting, "The one thing that you cannot take back is if you put a person to death, you can't bring them back to life. If you put a person to death and that person is innocent, that's one innocent life too many." Additionally, when the House was debating legislation that would "require a doctor to sign an affidavit that a woman is not seeking an abortion based on sex or gender," Jones declared that it was a "bald-faced lie" that the bill's advocates was supporting the legislation to oppose discrimination against minorities and women.

Due to term limits, she was not eligible for re-election in 2016.
