= Perry, Florida =

- City
- City of Perry
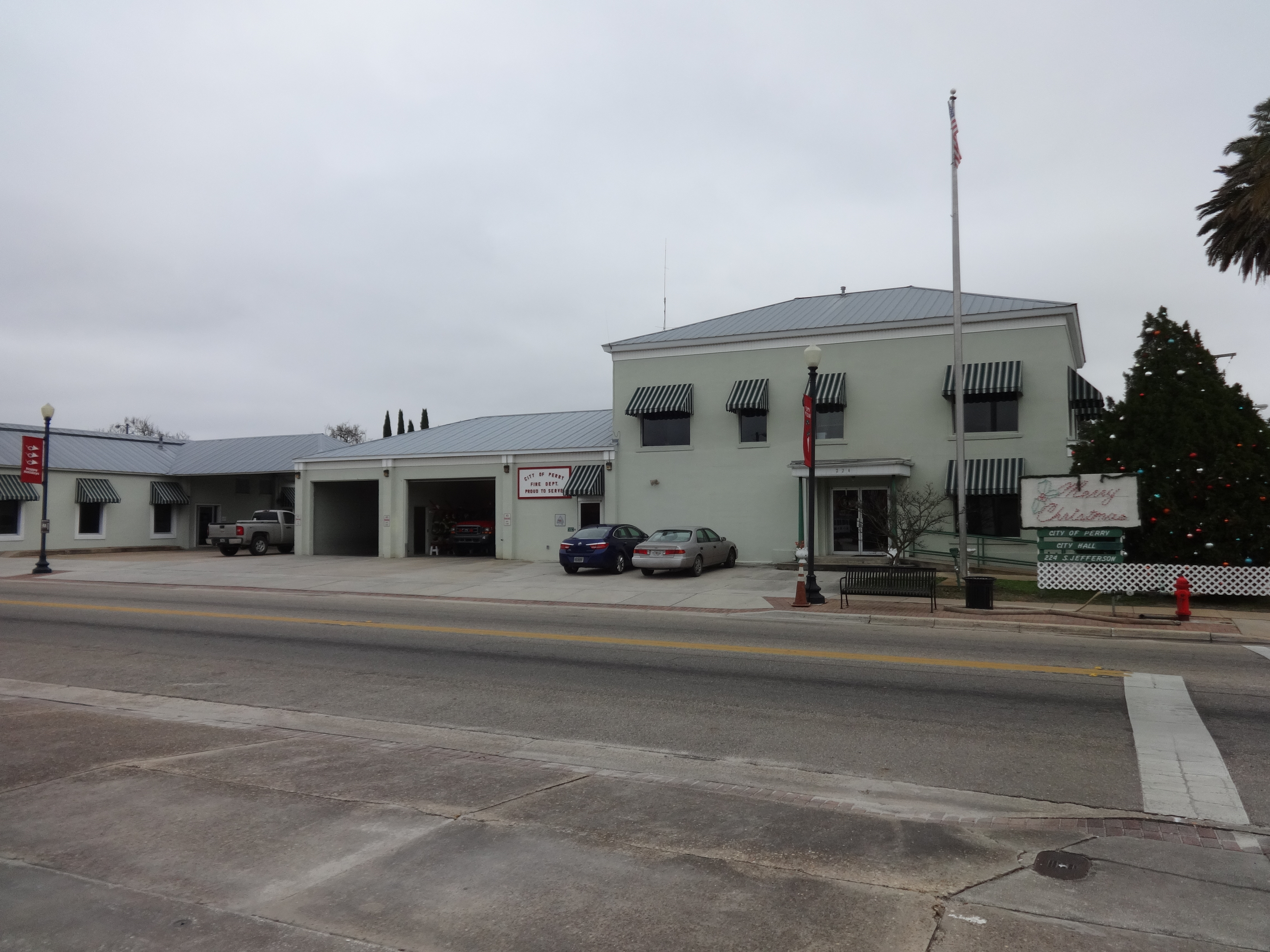
- Perry City Hall and Fire Department

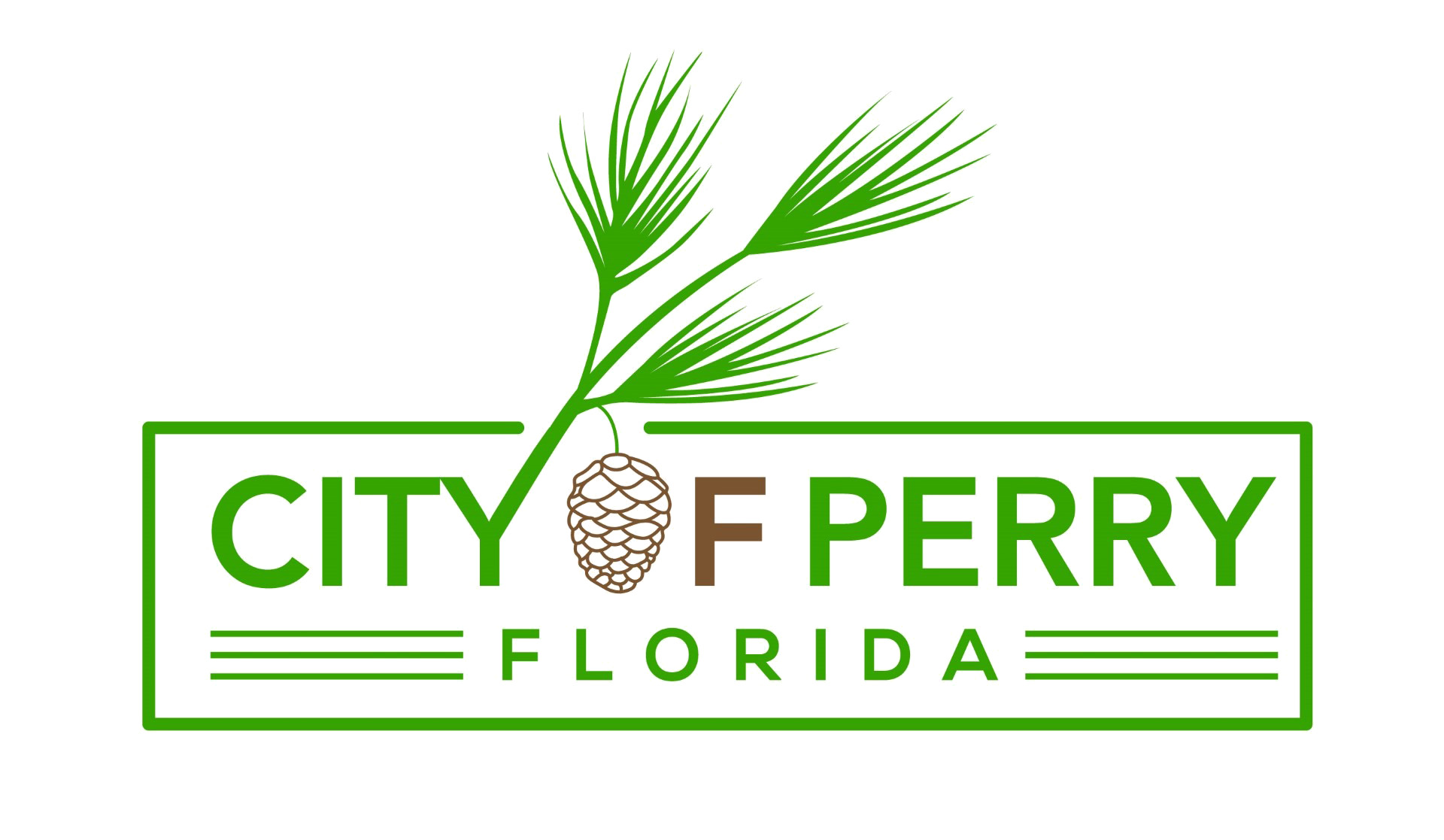
- Wordmark
- Motto: North Florida's Shining Star
- Location in Taylor County and the state of Florida
- Coordinates: 30°07′12″N 83°34′58″W
- Country: United States
- State: Florida
- County: Taylor
- Incorporated: 1903

Government
  - Type: Council-Manager

Area
  - Total: 9.43 sq mi (24.43 km^{2})
  - Land: 9.43 sq mi (24.43 km^{2})
  - Water: 0 sq mi (0.00 km^{2})
- Elevation: 46 ft (14 m)

Population (2020)
  - Total: 6,898
  - Density: 731.3/sq mi (282.37/km^{2})
- Time zone: UTC-5 (Eastern (EST))
  - Summer (DST): UTC-4 (EDT)
- ZIP codes: 32347-32348
- Area code: 850
- FIPS code: 12-56150
- GNIS feature ID: 2404505
- Website: cityofperry.net

Perry is a city and the county seat of Taylor County, Florida, United States. As of the 2020 census, Perry had a population of 6,898. The city was named for Madison Perry, fourth governor of the state of Florida and a Confederate colonel during the American Civil War.

== History ==
In 1922, Perry was a very small town of fewer than 2,000 people. During this time, a murder happened and three people were lynched for the crimes. Private retribution against the suspected families and those that gave them support ensued. The Perry Massacre occurred in Perry on the 14th and 15 December 1922, during which whites hanged Charles Wright and attacked the blacks of Perry after the murder of a white schoolteacher. On the day following Wright's lynching two more black men were shot and hanged; whites then burned the town's black school, Masonic lodge, church, amusement hall, and several families' homes.

Firefighters battling a blaze at a natural gas plant in August 1998 were injured when an explosion ripped through the area, sending a mammoth fireball into the sky. The flames destroyed at least six houses and several vehicles and forced the evacuation of 100 homes within two miles of the plant. Four firefighters were hospitalized with non-life-threatening injuries.

In August 2023, Hurricane Idalia impacted Florida. Perry was in the path of the storm and suffered damage across the city, and just a year and a few weeks later in late September 2024, Hurricane Helene made landfall near Perry as a Category 4-strength storm, causing major damage and loss of power.

== Geography ==
According to the United States Census Bureau, the city has a total area of 9.3 square miles (24 km^{2}), all land.

Perry is approximately 50 miles (80 km) southeast of Tallahassee.

=== Climate ===
Perry has a humid subtropical climate (Köppen: Cfa) with long, hot summers and short, mild winters.

Climate data for Perry, Florida, 1991–2020 normals, extremes 1897–2023
Month	Jan	Feb	Mar	Apr	May	Jun	Jul	Aug	Sep	Oct	Nov	Dec	Year
Record high °F (°C)	85 (29)	87 (31)	90 (32)	95 (35)	100 (38)	103 (39)	104 (40)	102 (39)	99 (37)	95 (35)	93 (34)	89 (32)	104 (40)
Mean maximum °F (°C)	79.0 (26.1)	81.2 (27.3)	85.0 (29.4)	88.3 (31.3)	93.7 (34.3)	96.4 (35.8)	96.8 (36.0)	96.2 (35.7)	94.1 (34.5)	90.2 (32.3)	85.2 (29.6)	80.3 (26.8)	98.3 (36.8)
Mean daily maximum °F (°C)	66.0 (18.9)	69.3 (20.7)	74.5 (23.6)	79.9 (26.6)	86.0 (30.0)	89.2 (31.8)	90.4 (32.4)	89.9 (32.2)	87.7 (30.9)	81.7 (27.6)	74.1 (23.4)	68.3 (20.2)	79.8 (26.6)
Daily mean °F (°C)	54.7 (12.6)	57.8 (14.3)	62.6 (17.0)	68.1 (20.1)	74.9 (23.8)	80.1 (26.7)	81.8 (27.7)	81.7 (27.6)	79.0 (26.1)	71.3 (21.8)	62.4 (16.9)	57.1 (13.9)	69.3 (20.7)
Mean daily minimum °F (°C)	43.4 (6.3)	46.4 (8.0)	50.6 (10.3)	56.3 (13.5)	63.9 (17.7)	71.0 (21.7)	73.2 (22.9)	73.5 (23.1)	70.2 (21.2)	60.8 (16.0)	50.7 (10.4)	46.0 (7.8)	58.8 (14.9)
Mean minimum °F (°C)	21.9 (−5.6)	25.2 (−3.8)	29.1 (−1.6)	38.0 (3.3)	48.5 (9.2)	61.9 (16.6)	65.9 (18.8)	66.4 (19.1)	57.4 (14.1)	40.0 (4.4)	29.6 (−1.3)	25.6 (−3.6)	20.1 (−6.6)
Record low °F (°C)	7 (−14)	14 (−10)	19 (−7)	29 (−2)	40 (4)	46 (8)	55 (13)	57 (14)	42 (6)	28 (−2)	14 (−10)	10 (−12)	7 (−14)
Average precipitation inches (mm)	4.76 (121)	3.37 (86)	4.74 (120)	3.06 (78)	3.52 (89)	7.22 (183)	7.09 (180)	8.59 (218)	4.81 (122)	2.86 (73)	2.20 (56)	2.77 (70)	54.99 (1,397)
Average precipitation days (≥ 0.01 in)	8.8	8.3	7.4	6.1	6.9	13.2	14.4	15.5	9.3	5.6	5.5	7.3	108.3
Source: NOAA

== Demographics ==
Historical population
Census	Pop.	Note	%±
1910	1,012		—
1920	1,956		93.3%
1930	2,744		40.3%
1940	2,668		−2.8%
1950	2,797		4.8%
1960	8,030		187.1%
1970	7,701		−4.1%
1980	8,254		7.2%
1990	7,151		−13.4%
2000	6,847		−4.3%
2010	7,017		2.5%
2020	6,898		−1.7%
U.S. Decennial Census

=== Racial and ethnic composition ===
Perry racial composition (Hispanics excluded from racial categories) (NH = Non-Hispanic)
Race	Pop 2010	Pop 2020	% 2010	% 2020
White (NH)	3,804	3,554	54.21%	51.52%
Black or African American (NH)	2,803	2,694	39.95%	39.05%
Native American or Alaska Native (NH)	34	26	0.48%	0.38%
Asian (NH)	96	153	1.37%	2.22%
Pacific Islander or Native Hawaiian (NH)	1	0	0.01%	0.00%
Some other race (NH)	3	17	0.04%	0.25%
Two or more races/Multiracial (NH)	124	218	1.77%	3.16%
Hispanic or Latino (any race)	152	236	2.17%	3.42%
Total	7,017	6,898	100.00%	100.00%

=== 2020 census ===
As of the 2020 census, Perry had a population of 6,898. The median age was 38.3 years. 26.5% of residents were under the age of 18 and 18.8% of residents were 65 years of age or older. For every 100 females there were 91.6 males, and for every 100 females age 18 and over there were 87.5 males age 18 and over.

85.0% of residents lived in urban areas, while 15.0% lived in rural areas.

There were 2,689 households in Perry, of which 34.2% had children under the age of 18 living in them. Of all households, 33.2% were married-couple households, 20.5% were households with a male householder and no spouse or partner present, and 38.5% were households with a female householder and no spouse or partner present. About 30.9% of all households were made up of individuals and 15.0% had someone living alone who was 65 years of age or older.

There were 3,074 housing units, of which 12.5% were vacant. The homeowner vacancy rate was 2.8% and the rental vacancy rate was 7.3%.

The 2020 ACS 5-year estimates reported 1,808 families residing in the city.

=== 2010 census ===
As of the 2010 United States census, there were 7,017 people, 2,366 households, and 1,618 families residing in the city.

=== 2000 census ===
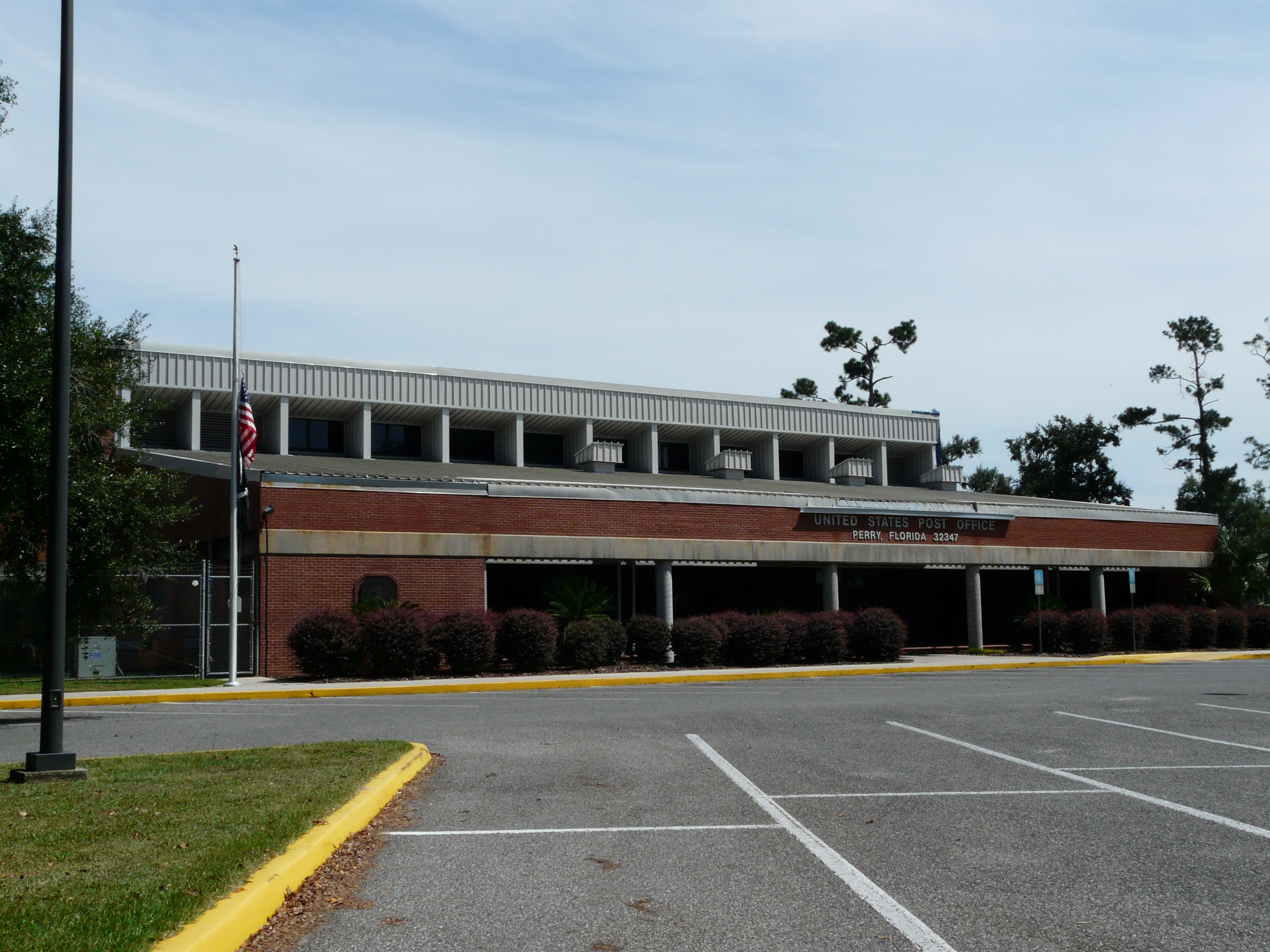
Post office

As of the census of 2000, there were 6,847 people, 2,661 households, and 1,828 families residing in the city. The population density was 284.6 people/km^{2} (737 people/mi^{2}). There were 3,073 housing units at an average density of 127.7 units/km^{2} (331 units/mi^{2}). The racial makeup of the city was 56.01% White, 41.17% African American, 0.64% Native American, 0.48% Asian, 0.01% Pacific Islander, 0.55% from other races, and 1.12% from two or more races. Hispanic or Latino of any race were 1.65% of the population.

In 2000, there were 2,661 households, out of which 33.3% had children under the age of 18 living with them, 40.4% were married couples living together, 23.8% had a female householder with no husband present, and 31.3% were non-families. 27.0% of all households were made up of individuals, and 12.4% had someone living alone who was 65 years of age or older. The average household size was 2.52 and the average family size was 3.02.

In 2000, in the city, the population age was spread out, with 28.4% under the age of 18, 8.8% from 18 to 24, 26.3% from 25 to 44, 21.5% from 45 to 64, and 15.0% who were 65 years of age or older. The median age was 36 years. For every 100 females, there were 87.8 males. For every 100 females age 18 and over, there were 84.3 males.

In 2000, the median income for a household in the city was $25,986, and the median income for a family was $29,602. Males had a median income of $26,595 versus $19,041 for females. The per capita income for the city was $13,845. About 23.0% of families and 28.0% of the population were below the poverty line, including 39.0% of those under age 18 and 26.7% of those age 65 or over.

== Education ==
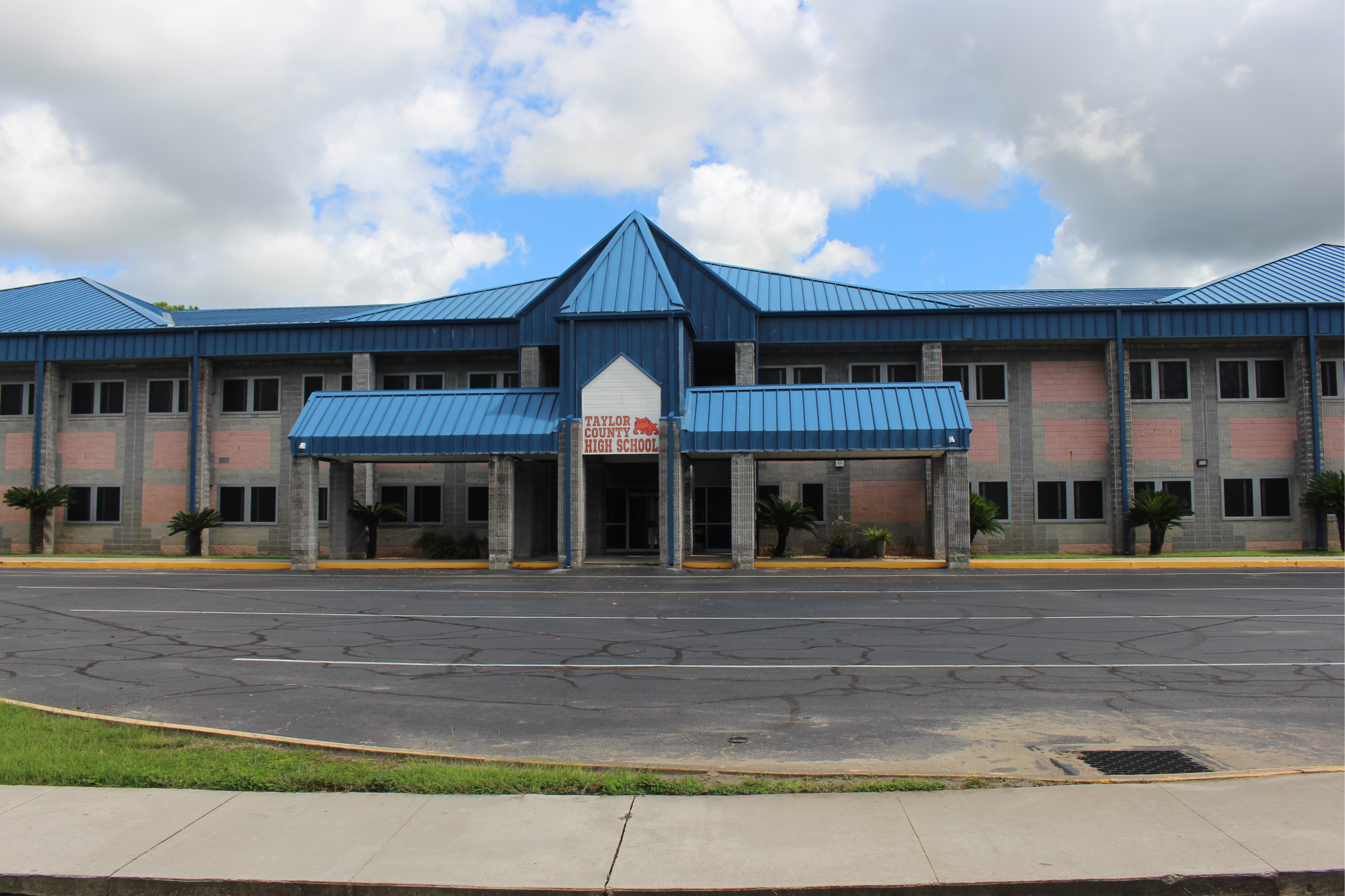
Taylor County High School

Students are served by the Taylor County School District. For the 2007–2008 school year, the Florida Department of Education gave the District a "B" grade, with each of its four schools earning a "B" as well.

Taylor County High School's Bulldogs were the 1977–1978 Class 3A football District 3, Region 2 and State Semi-final Champions, losing to Bartow High School in the championship game, 7–0. The 1978–1979 football team were the District 3 champions and lost to Milton High School in the Regional championship game. The 1980–1981 football team were the District 3 champions and Region 2 runner-up, losing to Milton HS in the Regional championship game. The football team won 1997–1998 Class 3A State Championship. In 2010, the Bulldogs completed an undefeated football season going 10–0, claiming the district championship.

== Transportation ==
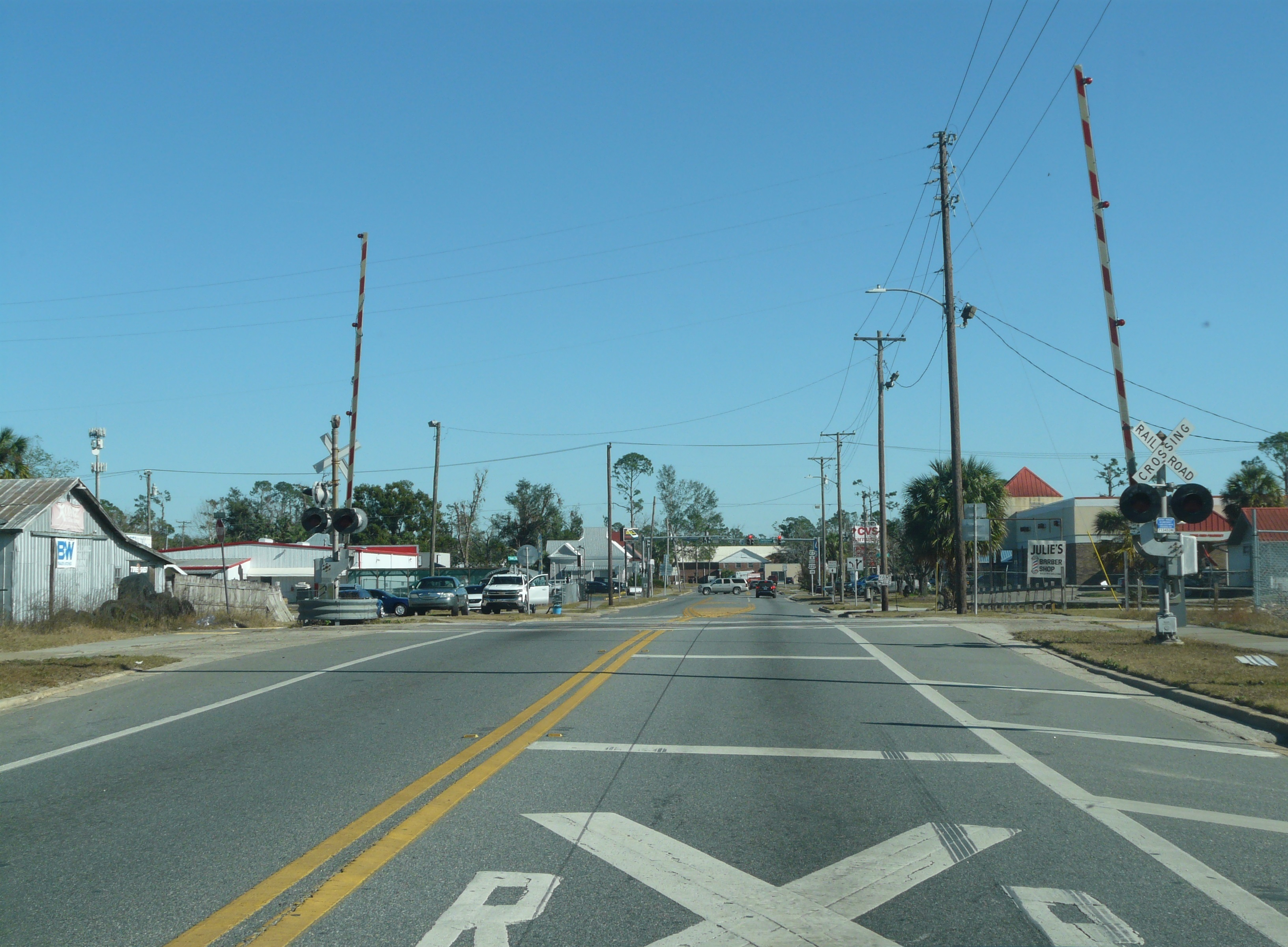
Railroad crossing US27-221

Perry–Foley Airport is a public-use airport located 3 miles (4.8 km) south of the central business district.

The city is served by Perry Shuttle, a bus route operated by Big Bend Transit.

=== Roads ===
==== U.S. Highways ====
- US 19
- US 27
- US 27 Alt.
- US 98
- US 221
- US 221 Truck

== Law enforcement ==
The Perry Police Department (PPD) is a 24-person agency with four Patrol K-9 teams. To be certified, each handler and K-9 partner receive at least 500 hours of training and, in some instances, as many as 800 hours.

== Notable people ==
- LeGarrette Blount, NFL player
- Ethel Cain, singer-songwriter and artist
- J. Broward Culpepper, university administrator
- Victoria Joyce Ely, World War I veteran and nurse
- Christine Falling, serial killer
- O. W. Jones, politician
- Claude Pepper, law professor and politician
- Herbert St. John, NFL player
- Saucy Santana, American rapper
- Troy Sneed, gospel singer-songwriter
- Rick Tuten, NFL player
- C. Bette Wimbish, civil rights activist and politician
