= Ken Smith (American politician) =

American politician (born 1926)

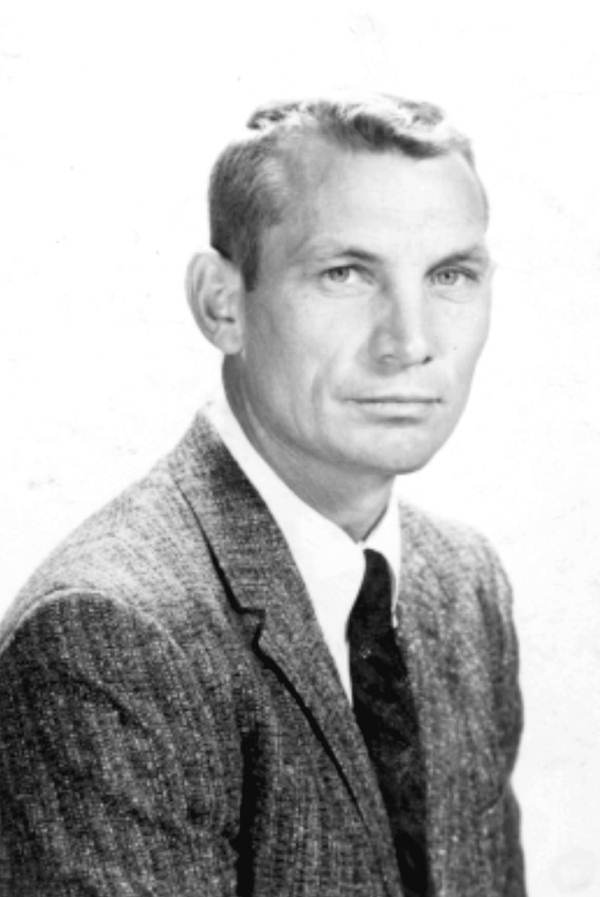

Member of the Florida House of Representatives for Taylor County
- In office 1961–1962
- Preceded by: O. W. Jones
- Succeeded by: Ben Whitfield

Personal details
- Born: Kenneth Bruce Smith; October 19, 1926 (age 99) Clanton, Alabama, U.S.
- Party: Democratic
- Occupation: Newspaper publisher

Kenneth Bruce Smith (born October 19, 1926) is an American former politician in the state of Florida.

Smith was born in Alabama and came to Florida in 1951. He attended Florida State University and was a newspaper publisher. Smith served in the Florida House of Representatives from 1961 to November 1962, and again from 1965 to 1970, as a Democrat representing Taylor County.
