= Gus J. Dekle =

American politician (1892–1961)

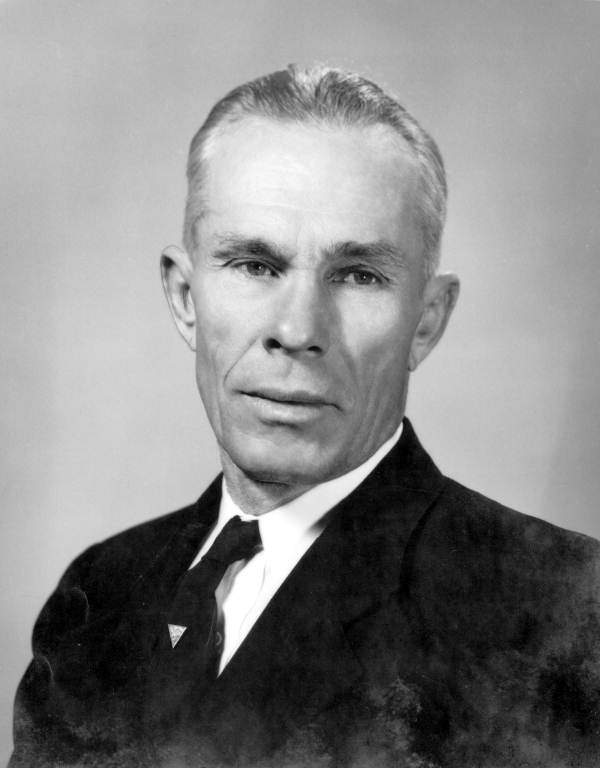
- Dekle in 1947

Member of the Florida House of Representatives from Taylor County
- In office 1947–1955
- Preceded by: Joseph Henry Scales
- Succeeded by: O. W. Jones

Personal details
- Born: Guthrie Joseph Dekle; May 22, 1892 Tarpon Springs, Florida, U.S.
- Died: November 21, 1961 (aged 69)
- Party: Democratic

Guthrie "Gus" Joseph Dekle (/ˈdiːkəl/; DEE-kəl; May 22, 1892 – November 21, 1961) was an American politician. He served as a Democratic member of the Florida House of Representatives.

== Life and career ==
Dekle was born in Tarpon Springs, Florida. Formerly an automobile dealer, he served in the Florida House of Representatives from 1947 to 1955. He died on November 21, 1961, at the age of 69.
