= The Harbinger (novel) =

Book by Jonathan Cahn

- Author: Jonathan Cahn
- Language: English
- Genre: Fiction
- Publisher: Frontline
- Publication date: Sep 2011
- Publication place: United States

The Harbinger is a 2011 Christian novel by Jonathan Cahn, a Messianic Jew, in which the 9/11 terrorism attack is presented as "divine warning" to the United States.

== Synopsis ==
The author says that The Harbinger is a loosely fictional novel, rooted in biblical analysis regarding a real-life, non-fiction connection: a prophecy about ancient Israel that was eventually fulfilled in the eighth century BC when Israel was destroyed, and certain corresponding events and facts related to the 9/11 terror attacks against the U.S. in 2001 that show parallels to those events. Cahn calls these events and facts "harbingers," and argues that they show a connection between ancient Israel's destruction and a possible coming destruction of the present-day United States. He also says that ancient Israel received a warning before being destroyed, and that the 9/11 harbingers form a similar warning from God to America.

The author argues that America was founded similar to ancient Israel and the Founding Fathers envisioned a country based on the rules of God and a Light Unto the Nations. The author lists a series of warnings or harbingers that were given to ancient Israel before its final destruction by the Assyrians and makes a parallel between each and the events of 9/11.

== Critical response ==
American television and radio host Glenn Beck called it "an incredible story", saying that the author's use of novel format was at present the only way to have a serious conversation about God for modern Americans.

American radio host and Denver, Colorado Pastor Bob Enyart interviewed Jonathan Cahn about his book, The Harbinger. And while Enyart was appreciative of Cahn's efforts to warn America about its rebellion against God, Enyart explained to Cahn, that what Cahn predicted was not a harbinger of things to come and advises pastors against making such outlandish claims that hurt the testimony of Christians as they seek to call the nation to repentance.
