= Jonathan Cahn =

American author and Messianic Rabbi

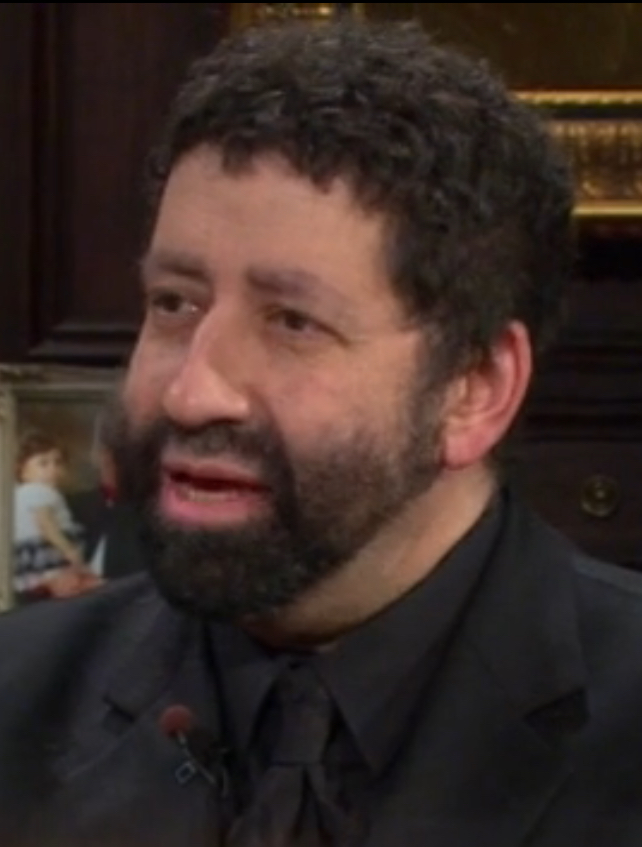
- Cahn in 2015
- Born: Jonathan David Cahn; 1959 (age 66–67); New York State, U.S.
- Occupations: Pastor (rabbi), author
- Years active: 1985–present
- Movement: Messianic Judaism; Evangelical Christianity
- Spouse: Renata
- Children: 3

Jonathan David Cahn (born 1959) is an American Messianic rabbi, author, and novelist known for his debut novel The Harbinger. He is the founder and leader of the Beth Israel Worship Center in Wayne, New Jersey. His ministry is a mix of contemporary American politics, conservative Christian beliefs, and the text of the Christian Bible. He can be a controversial figure for Christians, Jews, and secular historians.

== Personal life ==
Born in New York State, Cahn was raised in a Jewish family, the son of a Holocaust refugee, and attended synagogue frequently. Aged 20, after a near-death experience, he converted to Messianic Judaism. He graduated from the State University of New York at Purchase. Cahn started "Hope of the World Ministries", an international outreach of evangelism and compassion projects for the needy and currently is the president of the organization. He is married to a Brazilian, and has three children.

== Ministry ==
Cahn is the head of the Beth Israel Worship Center congregation whose "liturgy focuses on Jesus as Savior." The group had been located in Garfield, New Jersey, throughout the 1990s but moved to Wayne, New Jersey, in 2008. Their arrival in Wayne was viewed with suspicion by local Jewish clergy: Messianism is considered a form of Evangelical Christianity by most mainstream Christian denominations and all movements of Judaism and frequently proselytizes to Jews. With the arrival of Cahn's group, the YM-YWHA of North Jersey held a counter-missionary event with Jews for Judaism. Cahn told reporters that "the congregation has no intention of 'targeting' the Jewish community. However, anybody is welcome at the center."

Focused on end times prophecy, Cahn has said that the United States is "on the wrong path" due to the prevalence of abortion, the pursuit of gay rights, and the perceived decline in the public role of religion. He has cast President Donald Trump as a heroic and biblical figure and has attended Trump's Mar-a-Lago resort with other activists. Later, he said President Joe Biden had put the United States under "demonic possession" for lighting up the White House in LGBTQ Pride rainbow colors.

== Books ==
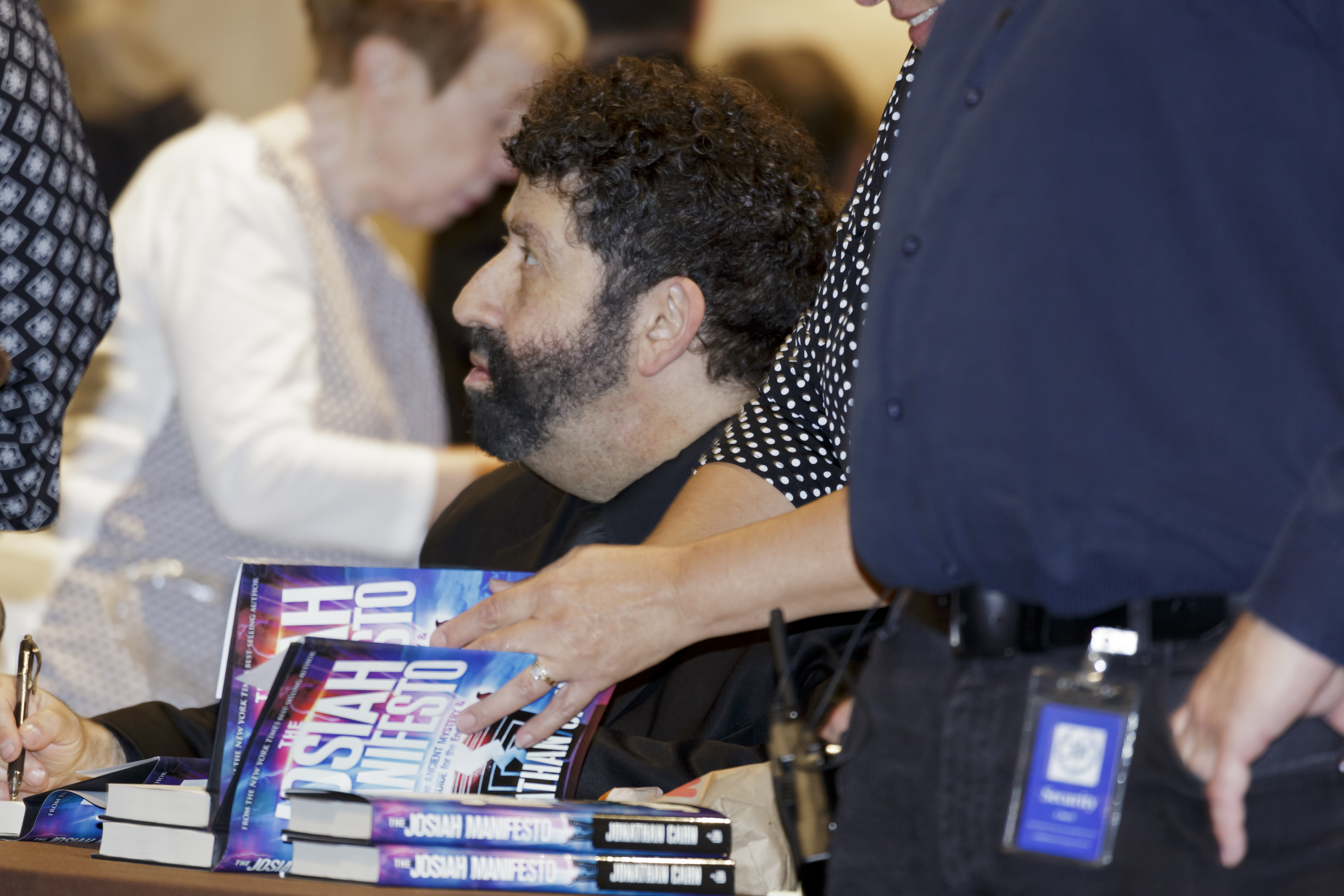
Cahn signing The Josiah Manifesto at Beth Israel Worship Center in Wayne, New Jersey

Cahn's 2011 debut novel, The Harbinger, compares the United States and the September 11 attacks to ancient Israel and the destruction of the Kingdom of Israel. Cahn has followed The Harbinger with eight other books: The Mystery of the Shemitah, The Book of Mysteries, The Paradigm, The Oracle, The Harbinger II: The Return, The Return of the Gods, The Josiah Manifesto, The Dragon's Prophecy, and The Avatar. The Paradigm debuted at #5 on The New York Times Best Seller list. In 2019, The Oracle: Jubilean Mysteries Unveiled, was published, which became #1 on Publishers Weekly and Amazon, and made The New York Times Best Seller list in two categories.

== Films ==
- The Harbinger Decoded is a documentary film based on the book, featuring Cahn.
- The Harbingers of Things to Come is a film calling for the people of the United States to repent and return to God and predicting America's destruction if they do not.
- The Dragon's Prophecy is a film based on the book.

== Bibliography ==
- The Harbinger (2011)
- The Harbinger Companion: With Study Guide (2013)
- The Mystery of the Shemitah (2014)
- The Book of Mysteries (2016)
- The Paradigm (2017)
- The Oracle: Jubilean Mysteries (2019)
- The Harbinger II: The Return (2020)
- The Return of the Gods (2022)
- The Josiah Manifesto (2023)
- The Dragon's Prophecy: Israel, the Dark Resurrection, and the End of Days (2024)
- Avatar: The Return of the Ancients, and the Future of America (Sept 2025)
- The Altar of Pergamon: The Mystery of the Dark Angel and the Future of the World (2026)
