= 2023 Jacksonville mayoral election =

- March 21, 2023 (first round); May 16, 2023 (runoff)
- Turnout: First round: 25.7% ▲1.14 pp Final round: 33.07%
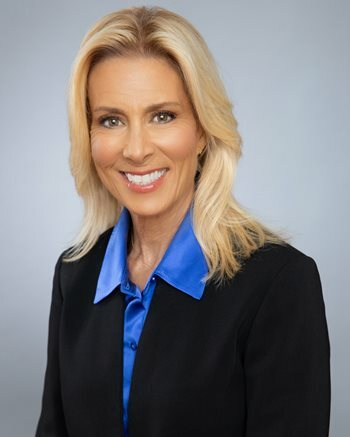

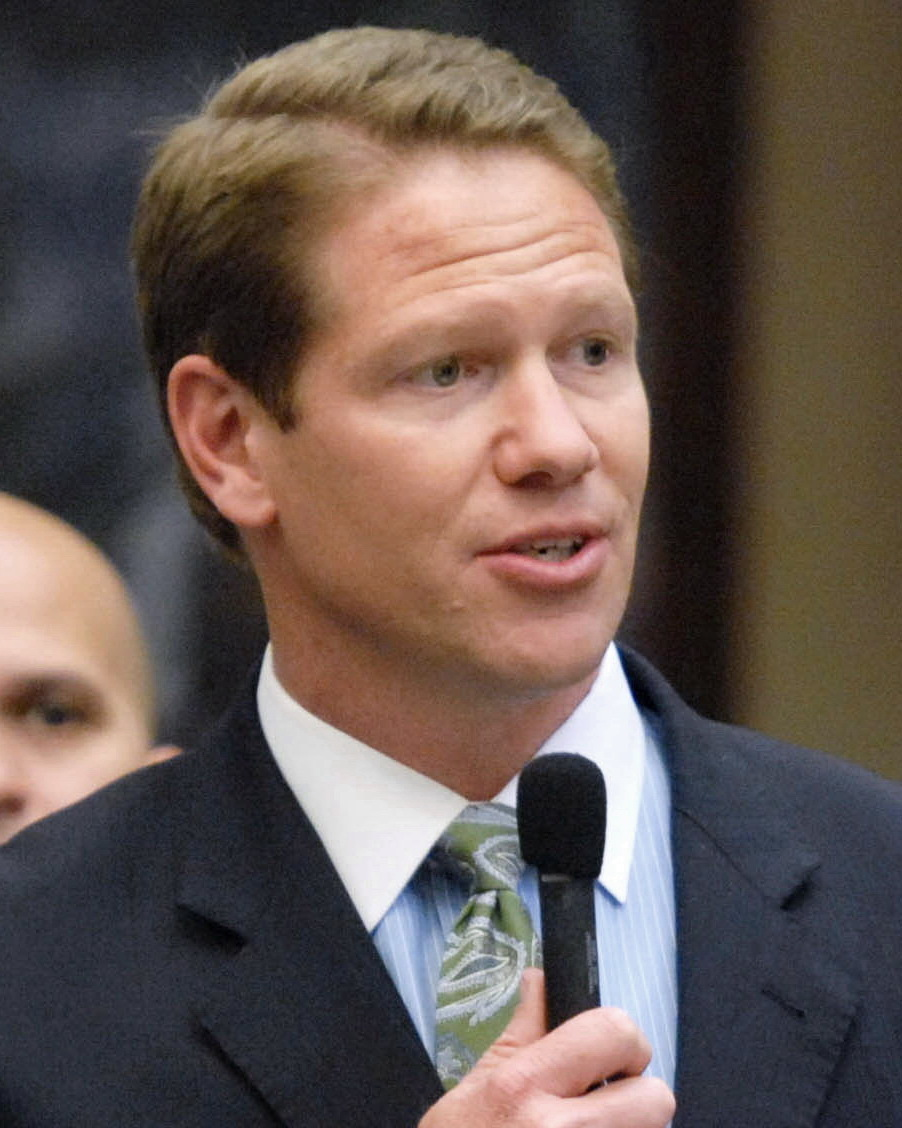

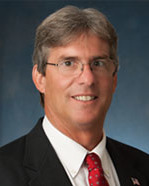

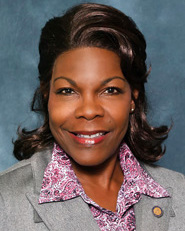

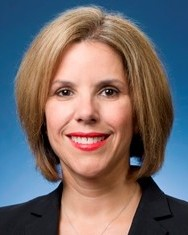
Candidate	Donna Deegan	Daniel Davis	Al Ferraro
Party	Democratic	Republican	Republican
Primary election	66,160; 39.4%	41,492; 24.7%	27,256; 16.2%
Runoff	113,226; 52.1%	104,172; 47.9%	Eliminated
Candidate	Audrey Gibson	LeAnna Cumber
Party	Democratic	Republican
Primary election	14,433; 8.6%	12,715; 7.6%
Runoff	Eliminated	Eliminated
- Deegan: <30% 30–40% 40–50% 50–60% 60–70% 70–80% 80–90% >90% Davis: <30% 30–40% 40–50% 50–60% 60–70% 70–80% Ferraro: 30–40% 40–50% 70–80%
Mayor before election
Lenny Curry
Republican
Elected Mayor
Donna Deegan
Democratic

The 2023 Jacksonville mayoral election was held on March 21, 2023, with a runoff held on May 16. Incumbent Republican mayor Lenny Curry was term-limited and could not seek a third term in office. Seven candidates filed to run, including four Republicans, two Democrats, and an independent. Jacksonville mayoral elections use a blanket primary system in which all candidates, regardless of party affiliation, appear on the same ballot.

Nonprofit founder Donna Deegan, a Democrat, and Jacksonville Chamber of Commerce president Daniel Davis, a Republican, took the top two spots in the primary election. Because no candidate surpassed 50% of the vote, Deegan and Davis advanced to a runoff. Candidates eliminated in the initial primary included city councilors Al Ferraro and LeAnna Cumber, both Republicans, and former state senate minority leader Audrey Gibson, a Democrat.

Deegan defeated Davis in the runoff, becoming the first woman ever to be elected Mayor of Jacksonville and the first Democrat to be elected since Alvin Brown in 2011. About 217,000 people voted in the runoff election for a turnout of 33%. Deegan's win resulted in Jacksonville losing its distinction as the most populous city in the United States with a Republican mayor; that instead became Fort Worth, Texas.

== Background ==
Jacksonville became the most populous city in the United States with a Republican mayor when Democrats flipped the mayorship of San Diego, California in 2020. Republicans had held the mayorship of Jacksonville continuously since 1993 with the exception of one four-year period when Democrat Alvin Brown served as mayor following his upset victory in the 2011 election. However, the consolidated city-county of Jacksonville and Duval County has historically been more Democratic-leaning than other counties in the state. In 2018, the Democratic nominees for governor and U.S. Senate both narrowly carried Jacksonville even as they lost statewide; in 2022, although the city voted for the Republican nominee in the gubernatorial and Senate contests, it still voted to the left of the state as a whole.

== Primary election ==
=== Campaign ===
The two leading Republicans were backed by different factions of the business community; Daniel Davis aligned himself with the network of developers, CEOs, and elected officials who backed incumbent mayor Lenny Curry and who traditionally hold great influence over city elections, while LeAnna Cumber was backed by a more conservative group of outsiders. Florida Politics commented that Cumber had the support of "various anti-Lenny Curry Republicans" in local government. Cumber heavily criticized Curry's effort to raise the Jacksonville gas tax, while Davis avoided taking positions on specific city issues and instead made broad appeals for unity. Al Ferraro was considered to have the most conservative platform of any candidate but lacked the fundraising and endorsements of Cumber and Davis, though his position improved over time due to well-received debate performances and improving polling numbers.

The campaign between Cumber and Davis was heated, with Davis running ads labeling Cumber a "fake conservative" because she donated to Democratic politicians in the past and Cumber running ads claiming that Davis "voted to make it easier for criminals to cover up sexual assaults against children," criticizing him for voting to let DACA recipients get driver's licenses, and accusing him of contributing to rising crime rates in Jacksonville. Both candidates also ran ads accusing each other of supporting the privatization of JEA, the city's publicly owned electric utility, though they each denied that they would sell it if elected mayor. In February 2023, the city council began investigating ties between Cumber's husband and a company that attempted to buy JEA. Cumber claimed the probe was orchestrated by allies of Davis to help him win the mayoral election.

In comparison, the two Democrats largely avoided criticizing each other and both ran on their own strengths, with Donna Deegan running a positive TV ad focused on her life story. Audrey Gibson is a longtime fixture of Jacksonville politics and had a reputation for working across the aisle during her time in the state legislature. Additionally, she was considered to have an advantage because 55% of registered Democrats in Jacksonville are black and she has a history of performing well in heavily African-American areas. However, Deegan has a great deal of name recognition from her time as a television journalist and the frequent public appearances she made during her mayoral bid. She prioritized small donors and was the only candidate to qualify for the ballot via petition rather than paying a fee. Deegan raised significantly more than Gibson, though her fundraising was still considered lackluster in comparison to Cumber and Davis.

=== Candidates ===
==== Republican Party ====
===== Declared =====
- LeAnna Cumber, city councilor
- Daniel Davis, president of the Jacksonville Chamber of Commerce, former state representative, and former president of the Jacksonville City Council
- Al Ferraro, city councilor
- Frank Keasler, consultant

===== Withdrew =====
- Matt Carlucci, at-large city councilor (endorsed Deegan)

===== Declined =====
- Ron Salem, at-large city councilor

==== Democratic Party ====
===== Declared =====
- Donna Deegan, breast cancer nonprofit founder, former First Coast News anchor, cousin of former mayor Tommy Hazouri, and nominee for Florida's 4th congressional district in 2020
- Audrey Gibson, former Minority Leader of the Florida Senate

===== Did not qualify =====
- Theresa Richardson

===== Declined =====
- Kimberly Daniels, state representative and former city councilor
- Brenda Priestly Jackson, city councilor (ran for an at-large council seat)

==== Independents ====
===== Declared =====
- Omega Allen, former chair of the Northwest Jacksonville Economic Development Trust Fund Advisory Committee and candidate for mayor in 2015 and 2019

===== Did not qualify =====
- Darcy Richardson, businessman, Reform nominee for governor of Florida in 2018, and Alliance nominee for vice president in 2020

=== Fundraising ===
As of December, Cumber and Davis held a wide lead in fundraising; Davis led with $4.5 million on hand while Cumber had $2.8 million. Al Ferraro lagged behind with $240,000. Among the Democrats, Donna Deegan had the most cash on hand with $590,000, while Audrey Gibson followed with $250,000.

=== Endorsements ===
In March 2023, flyers were distributed at polling places in northwest Jacksonville that listed candidates purportedly endorsed by former U.S. Representative Corrine Brown in the Jacksonville primary elections. The flyer recommended a Democratic candidate in every race except the mayoral race, where it recommended Republican LeAnna Cumber. Brown, a Democrat, claimed the flyers were fake and said that she had not endorsed any candidates yet, though she said there were "very qualified Democrats in the race for Mayor."

LeAnna Cumber (R)

Federal officials

- Eduardo Aguirre, former U.S. Ambassador to Spain (2005–2009) and director of the U.S. Citizenship and Immigration Services (2003–2005)
- Sada Cumber, former U.S. Special Envoy to the OIC (2008–2009) (her uncle-in-law)
- Rick Perry, former U.S. Secretary of Energy (2017–2019) and governor of Texas (2000–2015)
- Frank Zeidman, former chairman emeritus of the United States Holocaust Museum Council (2002–2010) and Republican Jewish Coalition board member (2014–present)

U.S. senators

- Tim Scott, U.S. senator from South Carolina (2013–present)

U.S. representatives

- Jim Banks, U.S. representative from IN-3 (2017–present)

State officials

- Jennifer Carroll, former lieutenant governor of Florida (2011–2013)

State legislators

- Jay Fant, former state representative from the 15th district (2014–2018)
- Dick Kravitz, former state representative from the 19th district (2000–2008)

Local officials

- William Bishop, former president of the Jacksonville city council (2012–2015) from the 2nd district (2007–2015)
- April Carney, Duval County Public Schools board member from the 2nd district (2022–present)
- Randy DeFoor, Jacksonville city councilor from the 14th district (2019–present)
- Jerry Holland, Duval County property appraiser (2019–present) and former president of the Jacksonville city council (2002–2003) from the 3rd district (1999–2005)
- Edward Skinner Jones, former Neptune Beach city councilor (1997–2005)
- Lauren Key, Neptune Beach city councilor from the 2nd district (2020–present)
- Sean Lynch, mayor of Baldwin (2016–present)
- Josh Messinger, Neptune Beach city councilor from the 4th district (2018–present)
- Jessica Ring, Atlantic Beach city commissioner from the 5th district (2022–present)
- Jack Webb, former president of the Jacksonville city council (2010–2011) from the 6th district (2007–2011)
- Scott Wilson, former president of the Jacksonville city council (2019–2020) from the 4th district (2015–2023)

Labor unions

- Florida First Coast Chapter of the Associated Builders and Contractors

Organizations

- First Coast Chapter of the National Association of Manufacturers
- Florida State Hispanic Chamber of Commerce
Daniel Davis (R)

Federal officials

- John Rutherford, U.S. representative for Florida's 4th congressional district (2017–present) and former Jacksonville Sheriff (2003–2015)

Local officials

- John Peyton, former mayor of Jacksonville (2003–2011)
- T. K. Waters, Jacksonville sheriff (2022–present)

Organizations

- Jacksonville Fraternal Order of Police
Donna Deegan (D)

State officials

- Nikki Fried, former Florida Commissioner of Agriculture (2019–2023)

Local officials

- Garrett Dennis, former Jacksonville city councilor from the 9th district (2015–2022)
- Ellen Glasser, former mayor of Atlantic Beach (2017–2022) (Republican)
- Harriet Pruette, former mayor of Neptune Beach (2008–2016)

Labor unions

- North Florida Letters Carriers Local Branch 53

Organizations

- EMILY's List
- Jacksonville National Organization for Women PAC (co-endorsement with Gibson)
- Ruth's List Florida
Audrey Gibson (D)

Organizations

- Jacksonville National Organization for Women PAC (co-endorsement with Deegan)
Darcy Richardson (I)

Organizations

- Alliance Party
Declined to endorse

Organizations

- Jacksonville Association of Fire Fighters

=== Polling ===
Poll source	Date(s) administered	Sample size (Note: Key: A – all adults RV – registered voters LV – likely voters V – unclear)	Margin of error	Allen (I)	Cumber (R)	Davis (R)	Deegan (D)	Ferraro (R)	Gibson (D)	Keasler (R)	Other	Undecided
University of North Florida	February 20–24, 2023	593 (LV)	± 4.0%	1%	5%	20%	37%	8%	7%	1%	–	22%
Florida Politics/St. Pete Polls	February 13, 2023	478 (LV)	± 4.5%	2%	4%	18%	35%	11%	10%	<1%	–	20%
University of North Florida	August 8–12, 2022	491 (LV)	± 5.9%	2%	7%	11%	31%	8%	10%	<1%	10% (Note: Darcy Richardson and Theresa Richardson each with <1%; "Someone else" with 10%)	20%
Frederick Polls (D) (Note: Poll sponsored by Deegan's campaign)	June 22–25, 2022	618 (LV)	± 4.0%	2%	8%	17%	30%	11%	17%	3%	1% (Note: Darcy Richardson with 1%)	9%
University of North Florida	February 11–16, 2022	443 (RV)	± 4.7%	1%	9%	20%	41%	7%	–	–	22% (Note: Darcy Richardson with 2%; other unspecified candidates with 20%)	–
University of North Florida	May 11–16, 2021	1,263 (RV)	± 2.8%	–	3%	6%	19%	3%	–	–	57% (Note: Matt Carlucci with 18%; Alvin Brown with 14%; Joyce Morgan with 5%; "Other" with 20%)	13%

=== Results ===
The Republican candidates combined for roughly 51% of the vote, while the Democrats combined for 48%. This was the highest first-round combined vote share for Democrats in a Jacksonville mayoral race since the 1995 election.

2023 Jacksonville mayoral primary election
Party	Candidate	Votes	%
Democratic	Donna Deegan	66,160	39.43%
Republican	Daniel Davis	41,492	24.73%
Republican	Al Ferraro	27,256	16.24%
Democratic	Audrey Gibson	14,433	8.60%
Republican	LeAnna Cumber	12,715	7.58%
Republican	Frank Keasler	4,010	2.39%
Independent	Omega Allen	1,583	0.94%
Write-in		153	0.09%
Total votes		167,802	100.00%

== Runoff ==
=== Endorsements ===
Endorsements in bold were made after the first round.

Daniel Davis (R)

Federal officials

- John Rutherford, U.S. representative for Florida's 4th congressional district (2017–present) and former Jacksonville sheriff (2003–2015)

U.S. senators

- **Rick Scott**, U.S. senator from Florida (2019–present) and former governor of Florida (2011–2019)

Statewide elected officials

- **Ron DeSantis**, governor of Florida (2019–present)
- **Wilton Simpson**, Florida Commissioner of Agriculture (2023–present)

State legislators

- **Dean Black**, state representative from the 15th district (2022–present) and chair of the Duval County Republican Party (2018–present)

Local officials

- **Joe Carlucci**, Jacksonville city councilor-elect from the 5th district (2023–present)
- **Lenny Curry**, mayor of Jacksonville (2015–2023)
- John Peyton, former mayor of Jacksonville (2003–2011)
- T. K. Waters, Jacksonville sheriff (2023–present)

Organizations

- Jacksonville Fraternal Order of Police

Political parties

- **Duval County Republican Party**
Donna Deegan (D)

Federal officials

- **Al Lawson**, former U.S. representative for Florida's 5th congressional district (2017–2023)

State officials

- Nikki Fried, former Florida Commissioner of Agriculture (2019–2023)

Local officials

- **Anna Lopez Brosche**, former at-large (2018–2019) president of the Jacksonville city council (2015–2019) and runner-up for mayor in 2019 (Republican)
- **Matt Carlucci**, at-large Jacksonville city councilor (1987–present) (Republican)
- **Randy DeFoor**, Jacksonville city councilor from the 14th district (2019–present) (Republican) (endorsed Cumber in the first round)
- Garrett Dennis, former Jacksonville city councilor from the 9th district (2015–2022)
- Ellen Glasser, former mayor of Atlantic Beach (2017–2022) (Republican)
- **Suzanne Jenkins**, former vice president of the Jacksonville city council (2001–2002) from the 4th district (1999–2007) (Republican)
- Harriet Pruette, former mayor of Neptune Beach (2008–2016)
- **Eric Smith**, former at-large (1979–1999) president of the Jacksonville city council (1990–1991, 1996–1997)
- **Scott Wilson**, former president of the Jacksonville city council (2019–2020) from the 4th district (2015–2023) (Republican) (endorsed Cumber in the first round)

Labor unions

- **American Federation of State, County and Municipal Employees Florida**
- North Florida Letters Carriers Local Branch 53

Newspapers and other media

- **The Florida Squeeze**

Organizations

- **Center for Biological Diversity Action Fund**
- EMILY's List
- **Equality Florida Action PAC**
- **Food & Water Action**
- **Friends of the Earth Action Fund**
- Jacksonville National Organization for Women PAC (co-endorsed Gibson in the first round)
- **Jacksonville Young Democrats**
- Ruth's List Florida

Political parties

- **Duval County Democratic Party**
Declined to endorse

Stage legislators

- Audrey Gibson, former Florida Senate Minority Leader (2018–2020) from the 6th district (2011–2022) and 4th-place finisher in the primary election (Democratic)

=== Polling ===
Poll source	Date(s) administered	Sample size	Margin of error	Deegan (D)	Davis (R)	Undecided
Florida Politics/St. Pete Polls	May 14, 2023	416 (LV)	± 4.8%	**48%**	46%	6%
University of North Florida	April 10–14, 2023	650 (LV)	± 3.8%	**48%**	47%	5%
Frederick Polls (D)	April 3–4, 2023	1,162 (LV)	± 2.9%	**54%**	46%	– (Note: Respondents were not given the option to say they were undecided.)
University of North Florida	February 20–24, 2023	593 (LV)	± 4.0%	**48%**	39%	14%
Florida Politics/St. Pete Polls	February 13, 2023	478 (LV)	± 4.5%	**51%**	26%	23%

Hypothetical matchups

Donna Deegan vs. LeAnna Cumber

Poll source	Date(s) administered	Sample size	Margin of error	Deegan (D)	Cumber (R)	Undecided
University of North Florida	February 20–24, 2023	593 (LV)	± 4.0%	**53%**	30%	18%
Florida Politics/St. Pete Polls	February 13, 2023	478 (LV)	± 4.5%	**55%**	16%	30%

Donna Deegan vs. Al Ferraro

Poll source	Date(s) administered	Sample size	Margin of error	Deegan (D)	Ferraro (R)	Undecided
University of North Florida	February 20–24, 2023	593 (LV)	± 4.0%	**51%**	35%	14%

=== Results ===
2023 Jacksonville mayoral runoff
Party	Candidate	Votes	%
**Democratic**	**Donna Deegan**	**113,226**	**52.08%**
Republican	Daniel Davis	104,172	47.92%
Total votes		**217,398**	**100.0%**
Democratic **gain** from Republican			

== Notes ==
Partisan clients

Preceded by 2019	Jacksonville mayoral election 2023	Succeeded by 2027
