= Donna Deegan =

American journalist and politician (born 1961)

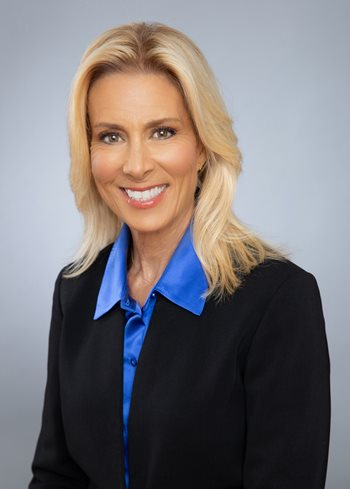
- Official portrait, 2023

9th Mayor of Jacksonville
- Incumbent
- Assumed office July 1, 2023
- Preceded by: Lenny Curry

Personal details
- Born: Donna Elizabeth Hazouri; February 28, 1961 (age 65) Jacksonville, Florida, U.S.
- Party: Democratic
- Spouse(s): Kevin Clewis (m. 1983, divorced) Dan Hicken (divorced) Tim Deegan (m. 2002)
- Children: 2
- Relatives: Tommy Hazouri (cousin)
- Education: Florida State University (BS)
- Website: Government website

Donna Hazouri Deegan (born February 28, 1961) is an American politician and former television news anchor serving as the mayor of Jacksonville, Florida since 2023. A member of the Democratic Party, she was elected mayor in the 2023 runoff election. She is the first woman to serve as the mayor of Jacksonville.

Prior to entering politics, she worked in broadcast journalism. Most notably, she was a lead television anchor on Jacksonville's First Coast News. Before running for mayor, Deegan had mounted an unsuccessful campaign for Florida's 4th congressional district in the 2020 election.

== Early life and education ==
Deegan was born Donna Elizabeth Hazouri on February 28, 1961. She has Lebanese ancestry through her father. Deegan's great-great-grandfather immigrated from Lebanon circa 1905. Deegan was raised on the south side of Jacksonville and graduated from Bishop Kenny High School in 1979.

She attended Florida State University and graduated in 1984 with a bachelor's degree in communications. She is the cousin of former Jacksonville mayor Tommy Hazouri, who served from 1987 to 1991.

== Early career ==
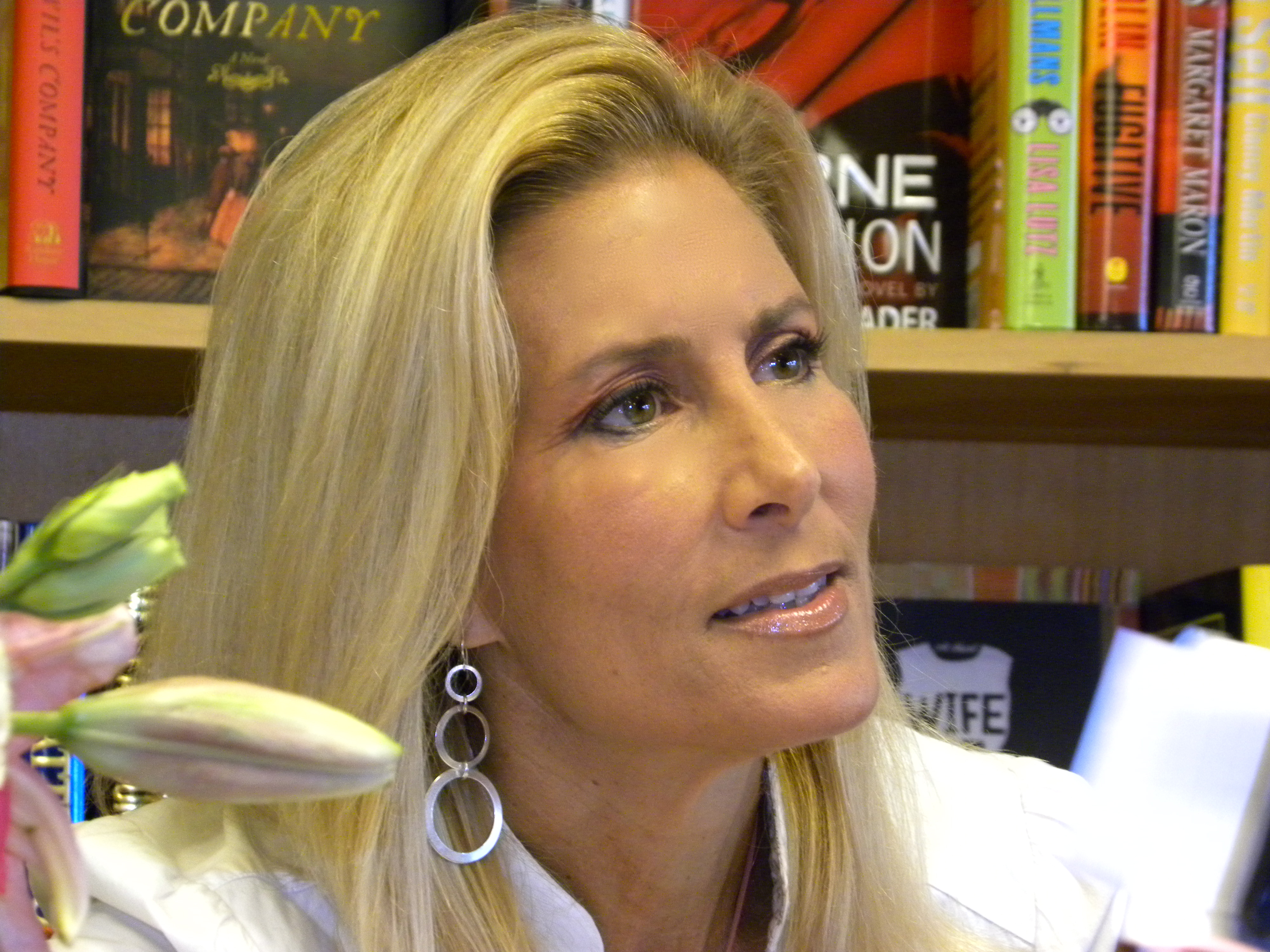
Deegan at a book signing in 2009

Deegan started her career in 1984 as the morning anchor for WTXL-TV in Tallahassee. In 1985, she became the West Palm Bureau Chief for WTVX in Fort Pierce. She then became the morning and noon anchor for WPEC in West Palm Beach, where she remained until August 1988. She then took the opportunity to return to her native Jacksonville and became the anchor of the weekend broadcasts on WTLV. In 1993, she became anchor of the 5:30 and 11 p.m. newscasts on WTLV.

Deegan has received many awards during her career, including the Jacksonville Business Journal Women of Influence Award in 2004 and the Enterprising Women's Leadership Award in 2005. On October 25, 2007, she was honored by Community Connections of Jacksonville at the Omni Hotel. She was the 2007 recipient of the Florence N. Davis Award for Lifetime Achievement.

=== Breast cancer advocacy ===
Deegan is a three-time survivor of breast cancer. She was first diagnosed in 1999, with recurrences in 2002 and 2007. She is the founder of The Donna Foundation, which provides the necessary funds to care for local women living with breast cancer. Her book, The Good Fight, chronicles her second bout with breast cancer and the online journal that she kept during that time.

On September 19, 2007, Deegan stated that a CT scan showed a small "suspicious" lesion in her lower left lung. A PET scan confirmed the lesion was there, but nothing more was found anywhere in her body. Initially, doctors were uncertain if the lesion was indeed cancer. However, on September 21, 2007, after surgery to remove the lesion, it was confirmed that it was; she yet again underwent treatment for cancer, including chemotherapy.

==== 26.2 with Donna ====
On June 22, 2006, the Mayo Clinic and The Donna Foundation announced the inaugural run of the 26.2 with Donna: The National Marathon to Fight Breast Cancer, benefiting Mayo Clinic and women living with breast cancer. The inaugural run of the marathon took place on February 17, 2008, and was co-organized by Edith A. Perez. A health expo preceded the race. She had been questioning whether she could run the whole marathon, but she and husband Tim finished in the middle. Over 7,000 runners showed up to run the race. Deegan announced that over $800,000 was raised to benefit the Mayo Clinic and women living with breast cancer. This money was used to help further a plan in which specialized treatment is used, instead of a "one size fits all" treatment.

=== 2020 congressional campaign ===
Deegan declared her campaign for Florida's 4th congressional district in 2019. She ran as the Democratic challenger to Republican incumbent John Rutherford in the 2020 elections. She lost to Rutherford on November 3, 2020, receiving 38.9% of the vote. Her top priorities on the campaign trail were healthcare, climate change, and gun violence prevention. She slightly underperformed Joe Biden in her own district, losing by more than 22 points, compared to Biden's 21-point loss.

== Mayor of Jacksonville ==
=== 2023 election ===
Deegan ran for Jacksonville mayor in the 2023 election. In the nonpartisan blanket primary, she received 39% of the vote and advanced to a runoff election against Republican Daniel Davis, who received 25% in the primary. On April 3, 2023, Davis ran an attack ad against Deegan, claiming that she attended all the Black Lives Matter demonstrations in Jacksonville after the 2020 murder of George Floyd. Deegan called the ad racially insensitive and responded that she did not plan to launch any attack ads against Davis.

Deegan defeated Davis in the runoff on May 16. She took office on July 1. At the time of her mayoral victory, Jacksonville was the most populous city in the United States to have a Republican mayor, a title now held by the city of Dallas, Texas. Jacksonville, which is coterminous with Duval County, had trended towards the Democratic Party over the preceding years; in 2020, Joe Biden became the first Democratic presidential nominee to win the county since 1976.

On December 27, 2023, Deegan had two confederate statues removed from the “Tribute to the Women of the Southern Confederacy” monument in Springfield Park, formerly Confederate Park. Deegan bypassed needing City Council approval by funding the removal without city funds. Instead, she paid for the removal with a grant from the Jessie Ball duPont Fund and anonymous donors.

Deegan became the first female mayor of Jacksonville, Florida, and the first Democrat to win the mayoral election for the second time in the last 30 years. Deegan's campaign had a focus on infrastructure updating, public safety enhancements, and economical issues. Her campaign's biggest focus was on unifying the city of Jacksonville.

In her 52% vote victory against Republican candidate Daniel Davis, Deegan made it clear that she will be focusing on the power of love while she is in office. The former news anchor marked a milestone for the city of Jacksonville, as she broke barriers in both a male-dominated and Republican political landscape.

=== First year as mayor ===
City of Jacksonville’s Mayor, Donna Deegan, speaks during the 37th annual memorial ceremony of the attack on the USS Stark at Naval Station Mayport, May 17, 2024.

During her first year as Mayor of Jacksonville Deegan started and completed several projects. She reopened and revamped the Friendship Fountain and opened the first link of the Emerald Trail in LaVilla. Despite controversy she also ordered the removal of a Confederate monument in Springfield Park. Her statement on this was: “I’d say it’s a big day for Jacksonville,” Deegan told News4JAX. “It’s a day to move us forward. And I’m just very, very grateful that we have the opportunity to do that.” Additionally she launched the River City Reader’s program. This program was started in light of a report that stated Jacksonville 3rd graders had a literacy rate of only 46% according to the FAST (Florida Assessment of Student Thinking) English Language Test.

=== Policies ===
In 2023, Deegan approved a spending plan amounting to over $25 million. The money was divided among programs for childhood literacy, affordable housing, homelessness, healthcare, and community aid.

Deegan has stated support for the issue of marijuana legalization. In November 2024, Amendment 3 was on the ballot which would allow marijuana to be legal for people who are over the age of 21.

At the start of her time in office Deegan revived the Journey Program to help cut down crime rates. The Journey Program previously ran starting in 2008 to cut down in crime rates. The Journey Program under the Deegan administration is planned to focus on literacy rates in order to slow the crime rates.

During the Jacksonville Jaguars Stadium renovation, Mayor Deegan signed a community benefits agreement. Money from the deal is allocated for workforce programs and housing issues.

=== Political positions ===
Deegan has held a pro-choice stance. When Florida legislation was passed mandating abortions be within the first 6 weeks of pregnancy, Deegan criticized the role of government in what she viewed as having excessive say in women's private medical decisions.

In the 2024 election, Deegan showed her support for incumbent president Joe Biden. After Biden dropped out, Deegan switched her support to the Harris Campaign. She has stated that the Harris administration and her administration have similar goals and stances on issues. Deegan was an early voter in the election, placing her support behind Harris.

In the 2026 United States Senate special election in Florida, Deegan declined to support Democratic nominee Angie Nixon, a Florida state representative from Jacksonville.

=== Relationship with the city council ===
In October 2024, Deegan took a trip to Europe, first visiting London for the UK government's International Investment Summit with the intention of bringing jobs to Jacksonville. She then visited Italy for a vacation. Council member Terrance Freeman, a Republican asked for an audit of Deegan's trip spending, suspecting she used taxpayer money for her vacation. However, investigations found that the only taxpayer money spent during this trip was for Deegan’s hotel in London which cost $2,978.18. The rest of the expenditures, including flights and meals, were paid for by Deegan.

Other members of the Jacksonville city council have called out Deegan for her policy. Council member Kevin Carrico said that Deegan’s office was not putting in enough effort into the negotiations for resurrecting the Laura Street Trio of historic buildings. In response Deegan released a statement explaining that the city developers have been meeting regularly with the building’s developers.

== Personal life ==
Deegan is a member of St. Paul's Catholic Church in Jacksonville Beach. Her maiden name is Hazouri and her first marriage was to Kevin Clewis in Tallahassee in 1983 (later divorced). She has two children from her second marriage to Action News Jax sports director, Dan Hicken. She later married First Coast News chief meteorologist Tim Deegan on August 9, 2002.

== Electoral history ==
2020 Florida's 4th congressional district
Party	Candidate	Votes	%
Republican	John Rutherford (incumbent)	308,497	61.10
Democratic	Donna Deegan	196,423	38.90
Write-in		20	0.00
Total votes		504,940	100.00
Republican hold			

2023 Mayor of Jacksonville
Party	Candidate	Votes	%
Blanket primary election
Democratic	Donna Deegan	66,192	39.43
Republican	Daniel Davis	41,505	24.72
Republican	Al Ferraro	27,265	16.24
Democratic	Audrey Gibson	14,440	8.60
Republican	LeAnna Cumber	12,721	7.58
Republican	Frank Keasler	4,011	2.39
Independent	Omega Allen	1,584	0.94
Write-in		149	0.09
Total votes		167,867	100.00
Runoff election
Democratic	Donna Deegan	113,157	52.08
Republican	Daniel Davis	104,130	47.92
Total votes		217,287	100.00
Democratic gain from Republican			

== Publications ==
- Hicken, Donna (2004). The Good Fight. Closet Books. ISBN 978-1891232183.
- Deegan, Donna (2009). Through Rose Colored Glasses: A Marathon from Fear to Love. Closet Books. ISBN 978-1891232190.

== See also ==
- List of mayors of Jacksonville, Florida
- List of first women mayors in the United States
- List of mayors of the 50 largest cities in the United States

Political offices
Preceded by Lenny Curry	Mayor of Jacksonville; 2023–present	Incumbent
