= 2026 United States Senate special election in Florida =

- November 3, 2026
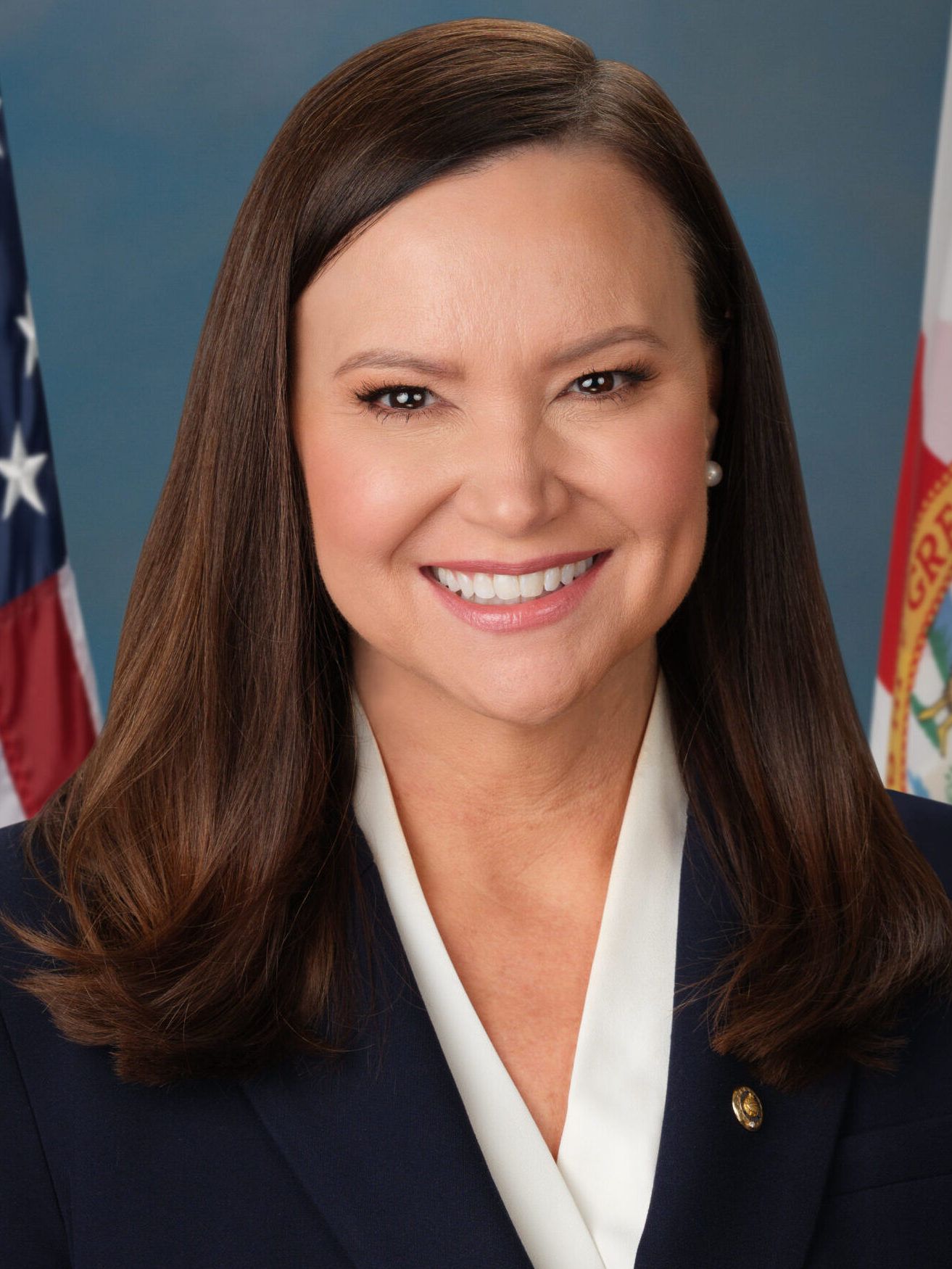

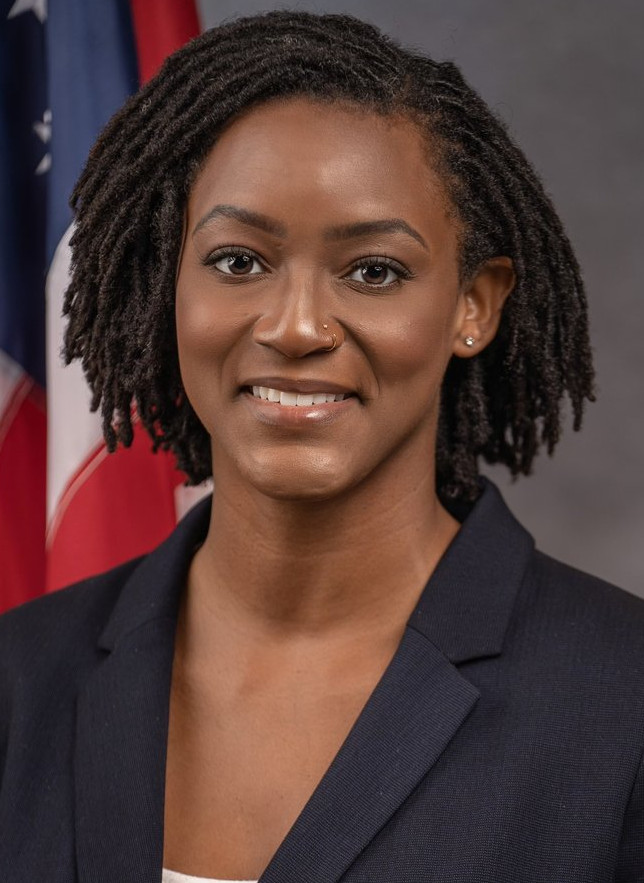
Nominee	Ashley Moody	Angie Nixon
Party	Republican	Democratic
Popular vote	4,211,733	3,975,375
Percentage	50.86%	48.00%
- Moody: 40–50% 50–60% 60–70% 70–80% 80–90% Nixon: 40–50% 50–60% 60–70% 70–80%
U.S. senator before election
Ashley Moody (Note: Marco Rubio, the three-term senator of Florida, was nominated by President Donald Trump to be the United States Secretary of State in his second cabinet. On January 20, 2025, he was confirmed by the Senate as Secretary of State and subsequently resigned his seat. Governor Ron DeSantis chose Ashley Moody to replace him.)
Republican
Elected U.S. senator
Ashley Moody
Republican

The 2026 United States Senate special election in Florida was held on November 3, 2026, to elect a member of the United States Senate to represent the state of Florida. Republican appointee Ashley Moody defeated Democratic state representative Angie Nixon. She will complete the term won in 2022 by Marco Rubio, who resigned in 2025 to become secretary of state.

In the primary elections on August 18, Moody won the Republican nomination against minimal opposition. Alex Vindman, the former director of European Affairs for the National Security Council, was considered the Democratic frontrunner and held a significant fundraising advantage during the primary, but Nixon won the nomination with 56.1% of the vote in an upset.

Moody defeated Nixon by a closer-than-expected margin, winning by 2.9% compared with polling averages that had projected her to win by 6.1%.

== Background ==
Marco Rubio, a U.S. senator from Florida since 2010, was announced as president-elect Donald Trump's nominee for secretary of state in November 2024. He was confirmed by the Senate on January 20, 2025 in a 99-0 vote. Ashley Moody, the attorney general of Florida, was named by Governor Ron DeSantis to fill Rubio's vacant Senate seat, and was sworn in the day after Rubio's confirmation. Rubio's resignation triggered a special election for 2026, the next statewide election cycle in Florida. The victor of the special election will serve for the remainder of Rubio's term, until a regular election for a full term in 2028 is held.

== Interim appointment ==
=== Appointee ===
- Ashley Moody, Florida attorney general (2019–2025)

=== Considered but not appointed ===
- Kat Cammack, U.S. representative from Florida's 3rd congressional district (2021–present)
- Jay Collins, state senator from the 14th district (2022–2025)
- Laurel Lee, U.S. representative from Florida's 15th congressional district (2023–present)
- Cory Mills, U.S. representative from Florida's 7th congressional district (2023–present)
- James Uthmeier, chief of staff to Governor Ron DeSantis (2021–2025)

=== Declined to be considered ===
- Ron DeSantis, governor of Florida (2019–present), former U.S. representative from Florida's 6th congressional district (2013–2018), candidate for U.S. Senate in 2016, and candidate for president in 2024
- Lara Trump, former co-chair of the Republican National Committee (2024–2025) and daughter-in-law of President Donald Trump

== Republican primary ==
=== Candidates ===
==== Nominee ====
- Ashley Moody, incumbent U.S. senator (2025–present)

==== Eliminated in primary ====
- Chris Gleason, technology consultant
- Neelam Taneja Perry, physician
- Ernest "Ernie" Rivera, businessman and candidate in 2016

==== Not on ballot ====
- Jake Lang, podcaster and participant in the January 6 U.S. Capitol attack
- Alix Toulme, religion founder and perennial candidate

==== Declined ====
- Matt Gaetz, former U.S. representative from Florida's 1st congressional district (2017–2024)

=== Endorsements ===
Ashley Moody

Executive branch officials

- Donald Trump, president of the United States (2017–2021, 2025–present)

U.S. senators

- Rick Scott, Florida (2019–present)

U.S. representatives

- Aaron Bean, FL-04 (2023–present)
- Gus Bilirakis, FL-12 (2007–present)
- Vern Buchanan, FL-16 (2013–present)
- Kat Cammack, FL-03 (2021–present)
- Mario Díaz-Balart, FL-26 (2003–present)
- Byron Donalds, FL-19 (2021–present) and 2026 Republican gubernatorial nominee
- Neal Dunn, FL-02 (2017–present)
- Scott Franklin, FL-18 (2021–present)
- Mike Haridopolos, FL-08 (2025–present)
- Laurel Lee, FL-15 (2023–present)
- Brian Mast, FL-21 (2017–present)
- Jimmy Patronis, FL-01 (2025–present)

Statewide officials

- Wilton Simpson, Florida commissioner of agriculture (2023–present)

Multi-county officials

- 15 state attorneys

County officials

- Ric Bradshaw, Palm Beach County sheriff (2005–present) (Democratic)
- Mike Chitwood, Volusia County sheriff (2017–present) (independent)
- Chad Chronister, Hillsborough County sheriff (2017–present)
- Rosie Cordero-Stutz, Miami-Dade County sheriff (2025–present)
- Bob Gualtieri, Pinellas County sheriff (2011–present)
- Grady Judd, Polk County sheriff (2005–present)
- Dennis Lemma, Seminole County sheriff (2017–present)
- John Mina, Orange County sheriff (2018–present) (Democratic)
- T. K. Waters, Duval County sheriff (2022–present)
- Morris A. Young, Gadsden County sheriff (2004–present) (Democratic)
- 54 other county sheriffs

Labor unions

- Florida Fraternal Order of Police

Organizations

- Associated Builders and Contractors of Florida
- Florida Association of Realtors
- Florida Chamber of Commerce
- Florida Farm Bureau Federation
- Maggie's List
- National Association of Realtors
- National Rifle Association Political Victory Fund
- Senate Conservatives Fund

Political parties

- Republican Party of Florida

=== Fundraising ===
Campaign finance reports as of July 29, 2026
Candidate	Raised	Spent	Cash on hand
Ashley Moody (R)	$11,259,074	$2,776,253	$8,482,821
Source: Federal Election Commission

=== Results ===
Republican primary results by county

Republican primary results
Party	Candidate	Votes	%
Republican	Ashley Moody (incumbent)	1,320,780	79.6
Republican	Chris Gleason	228,010	13.7
Republican	Ernie Rivera	79,973	4.8
Republican	Neelam Taneja Perry	31,250	1.9
Total votes		1,660,013	100.0

== Democratic primary ==
=== Campaign ===
Angie Nixon, a progressive Democrat and a member of the Democratic Socialists of America, won the nomination over Alex Vindman, despite Vindman having amassed $16.3 million in campaign funding compared to Nixon's $975,000. Nixon campaigned on universal healthcare, free childcare, and a national rent freeze. Nixon had criticized Vindman for having only recently moved to Florida; Vindman ignored her and attacked the Republican candidate, Moody. The result was considered a major upset.

=== Candidates ===
==== Nominee ====
- Angie Nixon, state representative from the 13th district (2020–present)

==== Eliminated in primary ====
- Alex Vindman, former director of European affairs for the U.S. National Security Council, whistleblower in the 2019 Trump–Ukraine scandal, and brother of U.S. Representative Eugene Vindman

==== Did not qualify ====
- Joey Atkins, attorney and nominee for Florida's 26th congressional district in 2024 (running for agriculture commissioner)
- Alex Gould, business owner
- Alan Grayson, former U.S. representative from Florida's 9th congressional district (2009–2011, 2013–2017) (ran for U.S. House)

==== Withdrawn ====
- Jennifer Jenkins, former Brevard County school board member (ran for U.S. House, endorsed Vindman)
- Tamika Lyles, former chair of the Osceola County Democratic Black Caucus (ran for U.S. House)
- Hector Mujica, tech executive (ran for U.S. House, endorsed Vindman)
- Josh Weil, teacher, nominee for Florida's 6th congressional district in the 2025 special election, and candidate for U.S. Senate in 2022

==== Declined ====
- Jerry Demings, mayor of Orange County (2018–present) and husband of former U.S. representative Val Demings (ran for governor)
- Jared Moskowitz, U.S. representative from Florida's 23rd congressional district (2023–present) (running for re-election)

=== Endorsements ===
Angie Nixon

U.S. representatives

- Maxwell Frost, FL-10 (2023–present)
- Ilhan Omar, MN-05 (2019–present)
- Ayanna Pressley, MA-07 (2019–present)
- Rashida Tlaib, MI-12 (2019–present)

State legislators

- Kristen Arrington, state senator from the 25th district (2024–present)
- LaVon Bracy Davis, state senator from the 15th district (2025–present)
- Tracie Davis, state senator from the 5th district (2022–present)
- Anna Eskamani, state representative from the 42nd district (2018–present)
- Ashley Gantt, state representative from the 109th district (2022–present)
- Dianne Hart, state representative from the 63rd district (2018–present)
- Yvonne Hinson, state representative from the 21st district (2020–present)
- Rosalind Osgood, state senator from the 32nd district (2022–present)
- Michele Rayner, state representative from the 62nd district (2020–present)
- Felicia Robinson, state representative from the 104th district (2020–present)
- RaShon Young, state representative from the 40th district (2025–present)

Individuals

- Ms. Rachel, YouTuber and children's educator

Labor unions

- SEIU

Organizations

- Democratic Progressive Caucus of Florida
- Dream Defenders
- Emgage
- Jewish Voice for Peace
- National Organization for Women
- Progressive Democrats of America
- Progressive Victory
- Track AIPAC
- US Campaign for Palestinian Rights
- Vote Mama
- Working Families Party

Newspapers

- The Bradenton Times
- The Miami Times
Alexander Vindman

U.S. senators

- Tammy Duckworth, Illinois (2017–present)
- Mark Kelly, Arizona (2020–present)
- Jack Reed, Rhode Island (1997–present)

U.S. representatives

- Jamie Raskin, MD-08 (2017–present)

State legislators

- Lori Berman, minority leader of the Florida Senate (2025–present) from the 26th district (2018–present)
- Dan Daley, state representative from the 96th district (2019–present)
- Michael Gottlieb, state representative from the 102nd district (2018–present)
- Tina Polsky, state senator from the 30th district (2020–present) (previously endorsed Jenkins)
- Debra Tendrich, state representative from the 89th district (2024–present)

Local officials

- Manny Diaz, former mayor of Miami (2001–2009)
- Jennifer Jenkins, former Brevard County school board member and former candidate for this seat

Individuals

- Larry David, comedian and producer
- Paul Eaton, former deputy chief of staff for the U.S. Army Training and Doctrine Command
- Hector Mujica, tech executive, former candidate for this seat and candidate for Florida's 26th congressional district in 2026
- Mary L. Trump, psychologist, writer, and niece of President Donald Trump and sister of Fred Trump III

Labor unions

- AFGE
- CWA Florida chapter
- SEIU Local 1991
- Southern Regional Council of Carpenters

Organizations

- End Citizens United
- Florida Democratic Party Veterans Caucus
- Jewish Democratic Council of America
- VoteVets

Newspapers

- Miami Herald
- Orlando Sentinel
Jennifer Jenkins (withdrawn)

U.S. representatives

- Debbie Mucarsel-Powell, former FL-26 (2019–2021) and nominee for U.S. senate in 2024

State legislators

- ~~Tina Polsky, state senator from the 30th district (2020–present)~~ (switched endorsement to Vindman after Jenkins withdrew)
Hector Mujica (withdrawn)

U.S. representatives

- Adam Smith, WA-09 (1997–present)

=== Fundraising ===
Italics indicate a withdrawn candidate.

Campaign finance reports as of July 29, 2026
Candidate	Raised	Spent	Cash on hand
Angie Nixon (D)	$974,845	$709,866	$264,978
Alex Vindman (D)	$16,273,862	$9,020,003	$7,253,859
Source: Federal Election Commission

=== Polling ===
Poll source	Date(s) administered	Sample size (Note: Key: A – all adults RV – registered voters LV – likely voters V – unclear)	Margin of error	Angie Nixon	Alex Vindman	Other	Undecided
Change Research (D)	July 9–11, 2026	— (LV)	—	24%	34%	2% (Note: "Would not vote" with 2%)	41%

=== Results ===
Democratic primary results by county

Democratic primary results by congressional district Nixon: 50–60%; 60–70%; 70–80%; 80–90%; Vindman: 50-60%; 60-70%

Democratic primary results
Party	Candidate	Votes	%
Democratic	Angie Nixon	705,835	56.1
Democratic	Alex Vindman	553,138	43.9
Total votes		1,258,973	100.0

== Third-parties and independents ==
=== Independents ===
==== Declared ====
- Neil J. Gillespie

==== Declined ====
- John Morgan, lawyer and founder of Morgan & Morgan

=== American Party ===
==== Did not qualify ====
- Jason Standridge, substance abuse counselor

=== Veterans Party ===
==== Did not qualify ====
- Justin Green

== General election ==
Formerly a swing state, Florida has shifted increasingly to the Republican Party in recent elections. A Democratic candidate has not won a Senate seat in Florida since 2012. This was the first U.S. Senate election in Florida in which both major parties nominated women as their candidates.

=== Predictions ===
Source	Ranking	As of
The Cook Political Report	Likely R	November 2, 2026
Decision Desk HQ	Likely R	November 3, 2026
The Economist (Note: The Economist's prediction model uses unconventional terminology. For the purpose of equivalency, their "Very Likely" ratings are formatted as a "Likely" rating while "Likely" ratings are formatted as a "Lean" rating.)	Likely R	November 3, 2026
FiftyPlusOne	Likely R	November 3, 2026
Fox News	Solid R	November 1, 2026
Inside Elections	Likely R	October 29, 2026
MS NOW	Likely R	October 29, 2026
NBC News	Likely R	November 3, 2026
RealClearPolitics	Lean R	November 2, 2026
Sabato's Crystal Ball	Likely R	November 2, 2026
Silver Bulletin	Likely R	November 3, 2026
Split Ticket	Likely R	November 2, 2026

=== Fundraising ===
Campaign finance reports as of October 14, 2026
Candidate	Raised	Spent	Cash on hand
Ashley Moody (R)	$14,524,032	$13,707,677	$816,355
Angie Nixon (D)	$11,319,380	$8,052,586	$3,266,795
Source: Federal Election Commission

=== Post-primary endorsements ===
Ashley Moody (R)

Individuals

- Sean O'Brien, General President of the International Brotherhood of Teamsters (2022–present)

Organizations

- Log Cabin Republicans
Angie Nixon (D)

Executive branch officials

- Barack Obama, former president of the United States (2009–2017)
- Alex Vindman, former director of European affairs for the U.S. National Security Council and primary candidate for this seat

U.S. senators

- Ruben Gallego, Arizona (2025–present)
- Chris Murphy, Connecticut (2013–present)
- Bill Nelson, former Florida (2001–2019)
- Bernie Sanders, Vermont (2007–present) (Independent)
- Elizabeth Warren, Massachusetts (2013–present)

U.S. representatives

- Pramila Jayapal, WA-7 (2017–present)
- Analilia Mejia, NJ-11 (2026–present)
- Alexandria Ocasio-Cortez, NY-14 (2019–present)

Local officials

- Alvin Brown, former mayor of Jacksonville (2011–2015)
- Raúl Martínez, former mayor of Hialeah (1981–2005)

Party officials

- Nikki Fried, chair of the Florida Democratic Party (2023–present)

Labor unions

- American Association of University Professors
- American Federation of Government Employees
- Association of Flight Attendants
- Florida AFL-CIO
- National Education Association
- National Nurses United
- United Auto Workers

Organizations

- Dolphin Democrats
- Elect Democratic Women
- EMILYs List
- End Citizens United
- Equality Florida Action
- Giffords PAC
- Jane Fonda Climate PAC
- Leaders We Deserve
- MoveOn
- National Women's Political Caucus
- Our Revolution
- Planned Parenthood Action Fund
- Reproductive Freedom for All
- Sierra Club
- UnidosUS Action Fund
- Voters of Tomorrow

Newspapers

- The Palm Beach Post
- Tampa Bay Times
Declined to endorse

Local officials

- Donna Deegan, mayor of Jacksonville (2023–present) (Democratic)

Newspapers

- Miami Herald

=== Polling ===
Aggregate polls

Source of poll aggregation	Dates administered	Dates updated	Ashley Moody (R)	Angie Nixon (D)	Other/ Undecided (Note: Calculated by taking the difference of 100% and all other candidates combined.)	Margin
270toWin	October 16 – November 2, 2026	November 2, 2026	50.8%	44.5%	4.7%	Moody +6.3%
Decision Desk HQ	through November 2, 2026	November 2, 2026	48.6%	43.0%	8.4%	Moody +5.6%
FiftyPlusOne	through November 2, 2026	November 3, 2026	49.7%	43.6%	6.7%	Moody +6.1%
RealClearPolitics	October 2–30, 2026	October 31, 2026	49.7%	43.4%	6.9%	Moody +6.3%
Silver Bulletin	through November 2, 2026	November 3, 2026	49.6%	43.5%	6.9%	Moody +6.1%
Average			49.7%	43.6%	6.7%	Moody +6.1%

Poll source	Date(s) administered	Sample size	Margin of error	Ashley Moody (R)	Angie Nixon (D)	Other	Undecided
Research Co.	October 31 – November 2, 2026	450 (LV)	± 4.6%	51%	44%	1% (Note: Neil Gillespie (I) with 1%)	4%
RedBox Research (D)	October 30–31, 2026	2,898 (LV)	± 2.1%	47%	45%	7% (Note: "Prefer not to answer" with 4%; Neil Gillespie (I) with 1%; "Someone else" with 1%; "Did not vote in this race" with 1%)	2%
Big Data Poll (Note: Poll sponsored by 1776 Law Center and Public Polling Project)	October 26–30, 2026	1,067 (LV)	± 3.0%	52% (Note: With voters who lean towards a given candidate)	45%	4% (Note: Neil Gillespie (I) with 4%)	—
Big Data Poll	October 26–30, 2026	1,067 (LV)	± 3.0%	48%	42%	3% (Note: Neil Gillespie (I) with 3%)	7%
Big Data Poll	October 26–30, 2026	1,122 (RV)	± 3.0%	51%	45%	5% (Note: Neil Gillespie (I) with 5%)	—
Big Data Poll	October 26–30, 2026	1,122 (RV)	± 3.0%	47%	41%	3% (Note: Neil Gillespie (I) with 3%)	10%
Stetson University	October 26–30, 2026	852 (RV)	± 3.6%	49%	45%	3%	3%
InsiderAdvantage (R)	October 28–29, 2026	1,200 (LV)	± 2.8%	49%	43%	2%	6%
Targoz Market Research	October 26–29, 2026	1,013 (LV)	± 3.0%	52%	43%	2%	3%
Political Matrix/The Listener Group	October 26–28, 2026	500 (LV)	± 4.4%	42%	36%	—	22%
St. Pete Polls (Note: Poll sponsored by Florida Politics)	October 25–27, 2026	916 (LV)	± 3.2%	49%	45%	3% (Note: "Someone else" with 3%)	4%
ActiVote	October 17–27, 2026	400 (LV)	± 4.9%	53%	47%	—	—
New York Times/Siena University	October 19–25, 2026	813 (LV)	± 3.9%	50%	44%	0%	5%
RedBox Research (D)	October 20–23, 2026	4,832 (LV)	± 2.5%	50%	43%	3% (Note: Neil Gillespie (I) with 1%; "Prefer not to answer" with 2%; "Someone else" with 1%; "Did not vote in this race" with 0%)	4%
Echelon Insights (R) (Note: Poll conducted for NetChoice)	October 16–23, 2026	515 (LV)	± 5.0%	51%	43%	3% (Note: Neil Gillespie (I) with 3%)	4%
Workbench Strategy (D) (Note: Poll commissioned by Nixon's campaign)	October 18–22, 2026	800 (LV)	± 3.5%	49%	47%	—	—
co/efficient (R)	October 18–20, 2026	1,014 (LV)	± 3.1%	48%	40%	2% (Note: Neil Gillespie (I) with 2%)	11%
University of North Florida	October 12–19, 2026	1,471 (LV)	± 2.8%	49%	45%	—	5%
Univision/YouGov	October 2–15, 2026	825 (RV)	± 4.0%	51%	42%	—	7%
ActiVote	September 27 – October 15, 2026	400 (LV)	± 4.9%	53%	47%	—	—
MDW Communications (Note: Poll conducted for EDGE Communications)	October 4–10, 2026	2,351 (LV)	± 2.8%	48%	42%	—	10%
Stetson University	October 1–9, 2026	716 (LV)	± 4.2%	52%	41%	2% (Note: "Another candidate" with 2%)	6%
St. Pete Polls	October 5–7, 2026	836 (LV)	± 3.4%	47%	45%	2% (Note: "Someone else" with 2%)	6%
YouGov	September 28 – October 5, 2026	3,813 (LV)	± 2.7%	49%	44%	1%	5%
Targoz Market Research (Note: Poll sponsored by the James Madison Institute, a conservative think tank)	September 28 – October 4, 2026	847 (LV)	–	52%	42%	2% (Note: "Another candidate" with 2%)	4%
Targoz Market Research	September 28 – October 4, 2026	1,171 (RV)	± 2.8%	50%	38%	4% (Note: "Another candidate" with 4%)	8%
Mason-Dixon	September 28 – October 1, 2026	625 (LV)	± 4.0%	50%	40%	2%	8%
Change Research (D) (Note: Poll commissioned by Freedom Project USA)	September 25–27, 2026	1,063 (LV)	± 2.8%	48%	47%	1% (Note: "Would not vote" 1%)	5%
Stetson University	September 14–21, 2026	830 (LV)	± 4.3%	51%	40%	3%	5%
InsiderAdvantage (R)	September 20–21, 2026	600 (LV)	± 4%	49%	42%	2%	7%
St. Pete Polls	September 15–17, 2026	913 (LV)	± 3.2%	45%	45%	3%	7%
Quantus Insights (R)	September 8–10, 2026	733 (LV)	± 4.1%	50%	43%	3% (Note: "Someone else" with 1%; "Wouldn't vote" with 1%)	4%
Change Research (D)	September 7–9, 2026	1,107 (LV)	± 2.8%	47%	47%	1% (Note: "Would not vote" with 1%)	5%
	August 18, 2026	Primary elections					
University of North Florida	July 8–17, 2026	848 (LV)	± 3.8%	50%	42%	2% (Note: "Someone else" and "Wouldn't vote" with 1%)	6%
Stetson University	March 15 – April 13, 2026	848 (LV)	± 4.1%	51%	38%	—	11%
Emerson College	March 29–31, 2026	1,125 (LV)	± 2.8%	47%	36%	—	16%
University of North Florida	February 21 – March 2, 2026	786 (LV)	± 4.0%	46%	38%	2%	15%

Hypothetical polling

Ashley Moody vs. Alexander Vindman

Poll source	Date(s) administered	Sample size	Margin of error	Ashley Moody (R)	Alexander Vindman (D)	Other	Undecided
University of North Florida	July 8–17, 2026	848 (LV)	± 3.8%	50%	40%	3% (Note: "Someone else" with 2%; "Wouldn't vote" with 1%)	7%
Change Research (D)	July 9–11, 2026	1,348 (RV)	± 2.8%	45%	37%	4% (Note: "Would not Vote" with 4%)	14%
McLaughlin & Associates (R) (Note: Polls sponsored by Associated Industries of Florida, which supports Moody)	June 3–7, 2026	800 (LV)	± 3.5%	47%	40%	—	13%
Global Strategy Group (D) (Note: Poll commissioned by Vindman's campaign)	May 18–21, 2026	1,000 (LV)	± 3.1%	46%	43%	—	12%
Change Research (D)	May 13–16, 2026	1,593 (LV)	± 2.3%	45%	47%	1%	7%
Change Research (D)	May 13–16, 2026	2,070 (RV)	± 2.3%	46%	41%	3% (Note: "Would not vote" with 3%)	10%
Cherry Communications (R) (Note: Poll sponsored by the Florida Chamber of Commerce)	May 1–9, 2026	604 (LV)	± 4.0%	48%	40%	—	12%
Stetson University	March 15 – April 13, 2026	848 (LV)	± 4.1%	49%	42%	—	9%
Echelon Insights (R) (Note: Poll commissioned by NetChoice)	April 3–9, 2026	406 (LV)	± 6.0%	50%	43%	—	7%
MDW (D) (Note: Poll sponsored by Edge Communications, a Democratic firm)	March 27 – April 3, 2026	1,834 (LV)	± 2.0%	43%	42%	—	14%
Public Policy Polling (D)	April 2–3, 2026	574 (RV)	± 4.1%	43%	40%	—	17%
Emerson College	March 29–31, 2026	1,125 (LV)	± 2.8%	46%	38%	—	16%
University of North Florida	February 21 – March 2, 2026	786 (LV)	± 4.0%	45%	38%	2%	15%

Ashley Moody vs. Jennifer Jenkins

Poll source	Date(s) administered	Sample size	Margin of error	Ashley Moody (R)	Jennifer Jenkins (D)	Other	Undecided
University of North Florida	October 15–25, 2025	728 (LV)	± 4.3%	49%	38%	3% (Note: "Someone else", "Wouldn't vote", and "Refusal" with 1%)	10%
University of North Florida	October 15–25, 2025	728 (LV)	± 4.3%	47%	37%	3%	13%
The Tyson Group (R) (Note: Poll sponsored by Plymouth Union Public Advocacy)	October 1–3, 2025	800 (LV)	—	44%	37%	—	19%

Ashley Moody vs. Hector Mujica

Poll source	Date(s) administered	Sample size	Margin of error	Ashley Moody (R)	Hector Mujica (D)	Other	Undecided
Emerson College	March 29–31, 2026	1,125 (LV)	± 2.8%	45%	38%	—	17%

=== Results ===
2026 United States Senate special election in Florida
Party	Candidate	Votes	%	±%
Republican	Ashley Moody (incumbent)	4,211,733	50.86	−6.82
Democratic	Angie Nixon	3,975,375	48.00	+6.73
Independent	Neil J. Gillespie	94,681	1.14	N/A
Total votes		8,281,789	100.0	N/A
Republican hold				

Counties that flipped from Republican to Democratic

- Duval (largest municipality: Jacksonville)
- Hillsborough (largest municipality: Tampa)
- Miami-Dade (largest municipality: Miami)
- Osceola (largest municipality: Kissimmee)
- Pinellas (largest municipality: St. Petersburg)
- Seminole ((largest municipality: Sanford)
- St. Lucie (largest municipality: Port St. Lucie)

==== By congressional district ====
Moody won 20 congressional districts, while Nixon won eight. Each nominee won two districts that elected members of the opposite party.

District	Moody	Nixon	Elected Representative
1st	63.63%	35.14%	Jimmy Patronis
2nd	53.58%	45.37%	Austin Rogers
3rd	55.46%	43.47%	Kat Cammack
4th	49.48%	49.49%	Aaron Bean
5th	56.23%	42.69%	John Rutherford
6th	61.48%	37.29%	Randy Fine
7th	51.17%	47.62%	Ryan Elijah
8th	53.39%	45.31%	Mike Haridopolos
9th	51.53%	47.38%	Darren Soto
10th	30.10%	68.95%	Maxwell Frost
11th	54.66%	44.33%	Joe Strada
12th	52.03%	46.64%	Gus Bilirakis
13th	52.80%	45.67%	Anna Paulina Luna
14th	48.86%	49.89%	Kathy Castor
15th	54.00%	44.68%	Laurel Lee
16th	53.62%	45.14%	Sydney Gruters
17th	59.03%	39.76%	Greg Steube
18th	50.78%	48.09%	Scott Franklin
19th	62.05%	36.95%	Jim Schwartzel
20th	22.86%	76.25%	Debbie Wasserman Schultz
21st	53.70%	45.18%	Brian Mast
22nd	48.85%	50.12%	Pia Dandiya
23rd	36.32%	62.62%	Lois Frankel
24th	19.96%	79.18%	Oliver Gilbert III
25th	50.51%	48.32%	Jared Moskowitz
26th	48.12%	50.82%	Mario Díaz-Balart
27th	49.89%	48.85%	Maria Elvira Salazar
28th	52.21%	46.70%	Carlos A. Giménez

== Analysis ==
Moody only won this race by 2.9%, a significant reduction from Donald Trump's 13.1% margin in the presidential election and Rick Scott's 12.8% margin in the concurrent Senate election. Nixon was able to flip Miami-Dade County, which Trump carried in 2024, back to the Democratic Party. She also improved on Kamala Harris's margin with Latino voters, winning the demographic by ten percentage points. While Democrats turned out in higher numbers than Republicans, they were ultimately unable to overcome Republicans' 1.5 million voter registration advantage, which grew by 400,000 relative to 2024. Additionally, outgoing governor Ron DeSantis credits Amendment 3, a property tax measure, with improving Republican turnout, helping Republicans win. With Moody's victory, Florida was the only state that Trump won by less than 18 points in 2024 to have Republicans for both of its senators, according to Kyle Kondik of Sabato's Crystal Ball.

=== Exit poll ===
2026 United States Senate special election in Florida (CNN)
Demographic subgroup	Moody	Nixon	% of total vote
Ideology
Conservatives	91	8	38
Moderates	36	62	41
Liberals	5	94	21
Party
Republicans	93	7	41
Democrats	1	99	30
Independents	40	57	29
Donald Trump job approval
Approve	96	3	44
Disapprove	15	83	55
2024 presidential vote
Donald Trump	93	6	51
Kamala Harris	2	97	42
Another candidate	41	48	2
Did not vote	28	69	5
Gender
Men	54	44	46
Women	48	51	54
Income
$100,000 or more	54	45	40
$50,000-$99,999	49	51	32
Less than $50,000	49	49	28
Race/ethnicity
White	60	39	67
Latino	44	55	18
Black	11	88	10
White born-again or evangelical Christian?
Yes	85	14	17
No	44	55	83
Latino descent?
Cuban	59	41	5
Puerto Rican	32	67	4
Other Latino descent	38	60	7
Not of Latino descent	52	47	83
Race by gender
White men	61	38	31
White women	59	40	36
Black men	22	77	5
Black women	5	94	7
Latino men	46	53	8
Latina women	42	57	9
All other voters	36	63	9
Age
18–29 years old	24	74	8
30–44 years old	36	61	16
45–64 years old	55	44	34
65 and older	58	41	41
Area type
Urban	44	54	21
Suburban	49	50	57
Rural	62	36	22
Education
College graduate	46	53	46
No college degree	55	44	54
Education by race
White college graduates	52	48	31
Non-white college graduates	34	65	15
Whites without college	67	32	36
Non-whites without college	31	68	18
Education by gender and race
White women with college degrees	49	51	17
White women without college degrees	67	31	19
White men with college degrees	54	44	15
White men without college degrees	67	32	16
Voters of color	32	66	33
Educational attainment
Advanced degree	44	55	19
Bachelor's degree	47	51	27
Associate's degree	51	48	13
Some college	53	45	18
Never attended college	58	41	23

== Notes ==
Partisan clients
