= Reggie Fullwood =

American politician

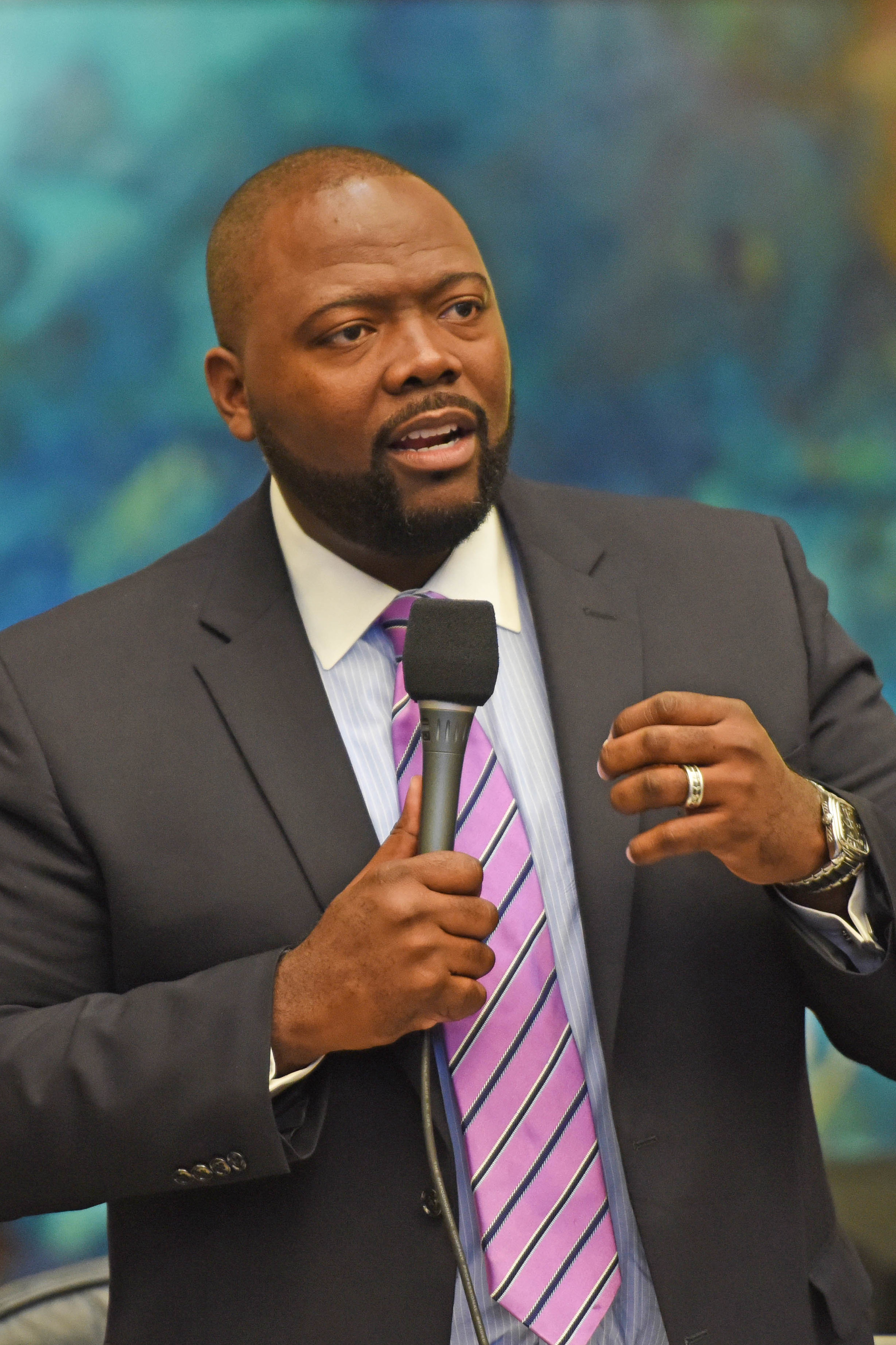

Member of the Florida House of Representatives from the 13th district
- In office February 18, 2015 – October 3, 2016
- Preceded by: Himself
- Succeeded by: Tracie Davis
- In office November 6, 2012 – November 4, 2014
- Preceded by: Daniel Davis
- Succeeded by: Vacant (until 2015 special election)

Member of the Florida House of Representatives from the 15th district
- In office November 2, 2010 – November 6, 2012
- Preceded by: Audrey Gibson
- Succeeded by: Daniel Davis

Personal details
- Born: April 4, 1975 (age 51) Jacksonville, Florida, U.S.
- Party: Democratic
- Spouse: Latasha "Tasha" Garrison
- Children: 3
- Education: University of North Florida (BA)
- Profession: Consultant

Reginald "Reggie" Fullwood (born April 4, 1975) is former a Democratic member of the Florida House of Representatives. From 2010 to 2014 and 2015 to 2016, he represented downtown Jacksonville in central Duval County.

== History ==
Fullwood was born in Jacksonville in 1975 and attended the University of North Florida, where he graduated with a degree in communications in 1997. In 1999, Fullwood was elected to the Jacksonville City Council, and was the youngest person to be elected to the city council in city history. He served on the City Council from 1999 to 2007.

== Florida House of Representatives ==
In 2006, Fullwood challenged incumbent State Representative Audrey Gibson in the Democratic primary in the 15th District, and he ultimately lost to her, receiving 43% of the vote. When Gibson was prevented from seeking another term due to term limits in 2010, Fullwood ran to succeed her, winning the nomination of his party unopposed. He faced Republican nominee Randy Smith in the general election, whom he defeated in a landslide, receiving 67% of the vote.

In 2012, Fullwood was redistricted into the 15th District, which included most of the territory of his old district. He faced no opposition in both the Democratic primary and the general election, and he was sworn into his second term in the House.

In 2013, Fullwood joined with State Senator Dwight Bullard to propose legislation that would strengthen protections against cyberbullying, specifically, expanding "the authority of Florida's public schools to discipline students for cyberbullying done through the use of a school computer, at the site of a school-sponsored activity or on a school bus." During the controversy over whether the state of Florida should participate in the Medicare expansion as authorized under the Patient Protection and Affordable Care Act, Fullwood supported the expansion and criticized Republicans who opposed accepting federal funds, observing that the state of Florida already accepts billions of dollars in federal funds for other purposes; "Why not just accept any federal funds? If that's the mantra, let's just not accept any," Fullwood noted.

== 2015 special election ==
In 2014, Fullwood planned on running for re-election to a third term in the Florida House of Representatives, and filed paperwork to do so. The Florida Department of State, however, rejected Fullwood's paperwork due to a notary error on his financial disclosure form. Because Fullwood was the only candidate running in the district, the state scheduled a special election. Fullwood filed a lawsuit to seek certification as a qualified candidate, but the lawsuit was rejected. In September, Governor Rick Scott scheduled a special primary election for December, and a special general election for February.

Fullwood announced that he would run in the special election to succeed himself, and term-limited Jacksonville City Councilman Johnny Gaffney announced that he would also run in the Democratic primary. During the campaign, Fullwood received significant financial support from Democrats in the legislature, with House Minority Leader Mark Pafford emailing his colleagues to urge them to contribute to Fullwood's campaign. Gaffney criticized Pafford's actions, declaring, "This type of leadership and behavior only encourages acrimony, division and polarization of the party, and only continues the status quo." Gaffney received the support of the Florida Federation for Children, a school voucher advocacy organization, which criticized Fullwood for opposing school vouchers and sent out mailers attacking him for the financial cost of the special election and for receiving a fine from the Florida Elections Commission. Ultimately, though, Gaffney did not prove to be a significant hurdle, and Fullwood won the Democratic primary handily, winning nearly 64% of the vote.

In the general election, Fullwood was opposed by Lawrence Jefferson, the Republican nominee. Jefferson did not present much of a challenge for Fullwood in the solidly-Democratic district, and Fullwood campaigned on his support for public education. He ended up winning easily, receiving 57% of the vote to Jefferson's 43%.

== Federal indictment and resignation ==
In April 2016, Fullwood was indicted on ten counts of federal wire fraud and four counts of failure to file federal income tax returns. The charges alleged that he transferred funds from his campaign account to personal accounts, and used the money on personal expenses. Fullwood initially pled not guilty, but on September 29 he pled guilty to one wire fraud charge and one income tax charge. He subsequently withdrew from reelection to the Florida House and resigned from office on October 3. Full was found guilty on two counts, but due to his service to the community and at the urging of the prosecution, he was given one year of supervision, 180 days home confinement, 450 hours of community service and had to pay $100,000 in restitution.

On October 4, Tracie Davis was chosen by the Duval County Democratic Executive Committee to take Fullwood's place as the Democratic candidate for House District 13. On November 8, Davis beat Republican challenger Mark Griffin by almost 20 percentage points, winning Fullwood's seat in the House.
