= Mike Hogan (Florida politician) =

American politician

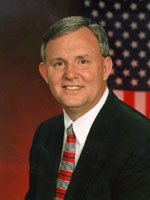

Duval County Supervisor of Elections
- In office July 2015 – July 2023
- Preceded by: Jerry Holland
- Succeeded by: Jerry Holland

Member of the Florida House of Representatives from the 13th district
- In office November 7, 2000 – May 13, 2003
- Preceded by: Stephen Wise
- Succeeded by: Jennifer Carroll

Member of the Jacksonville City Council
- In office 1991–1999

Personal details
- Born: September 30, 1949 (age 76) Jacksonville, Florida, U.S.
- Party: Republican
- Spouse: Judy Gunther
- Children: 3
- Education: Florida Junior College; University of South Florida

Mike Hogan (born September 30, 1949) is an American politician who served as the supervisor of elections of Duval County, Florida from 2015 to 2023.

Hogan was born at St. Luke's Hospital in Jacksonville, Florida on September 30, 1949, and graduated from Paxon High School before earning an associate degree at Florida Junior College, followed by a bachelor of arts degree in zoology from the University of South Florida.

A member of the Republican Party, Hogan served on the Jacksonville City Council from 1991 to 1999. He was elected to the Florida House of Representatives twice, in 2000 and 2002. Between 2003 and 2011, Hogan was the Duval County Tax Collector. He ran for mayor in Jacksonville in 2011, losing to Alvin Brown. Florida Governor Rick Scott later appointed Hogan chair of the Public Employees Relations Commission through January 1, 2012. In January 2015, Hogan announced his intention to run for Duval County Supervisor of Elections. He was elected to the position in March 2015.

Hogan married Judy Gunther of Tampa and has three children.
