= Angie Nixon =

American politician (born 1984)

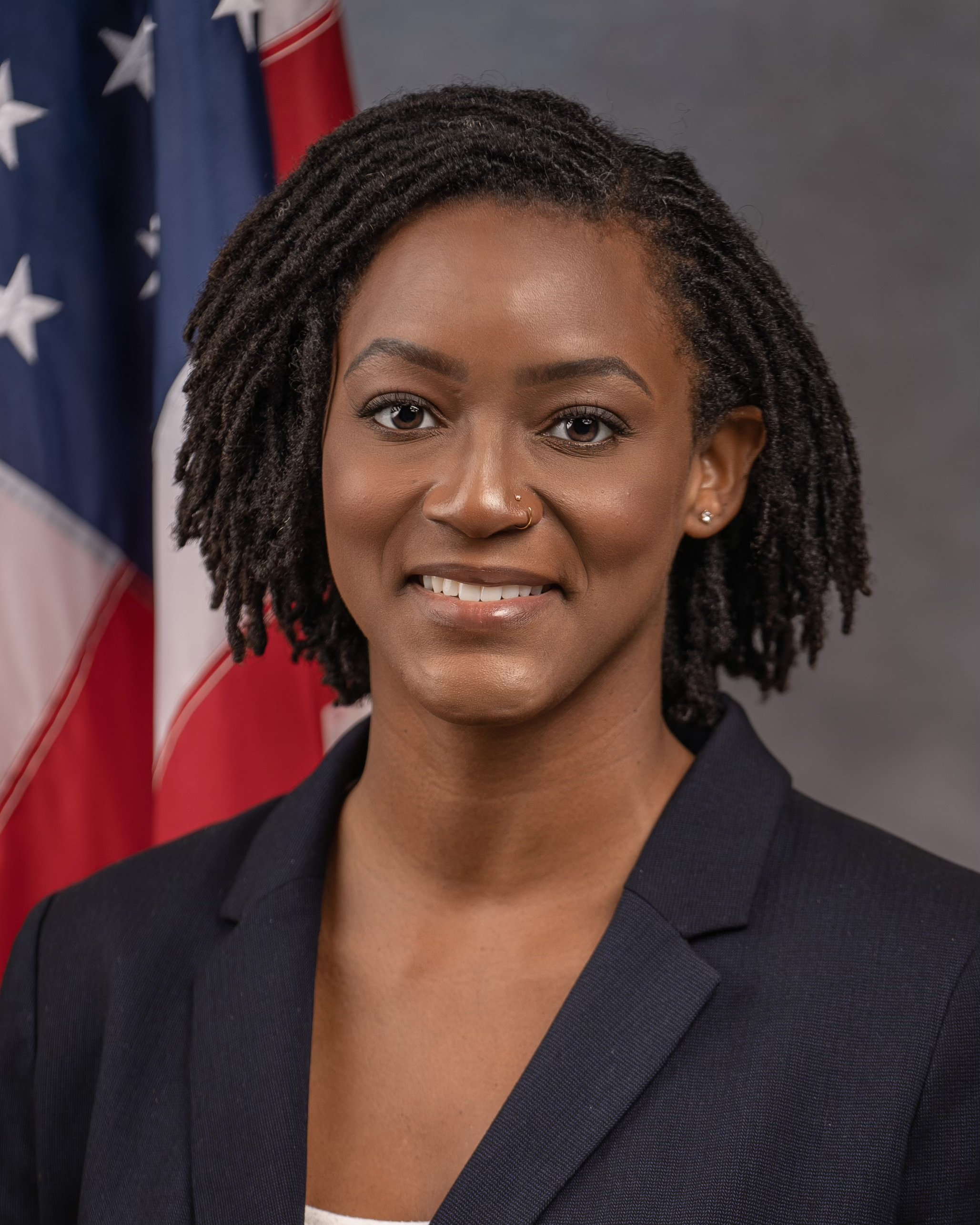
- Official portrait, 2022

Member of the Florida House of Representatives
- In office November 3, 2020 – November 3, 2026
- Preceded by: Kimberly Daniels
- Succeeded by: Audrey Gibson
- Constituency: 14th district (2020–2022); 13th district (2022–2026)

Personal details
- Born: February 27, 1984 (age 42) Jacksonville, Florida, U.S.
- Party: Democratic
- Other political affiliations: Working Families Party; Democratic Socialists of America (Note: The Democratic Socialists of America (DSA) are not a registered political party. Instead, they are a political organization for those with democratic socialist ideologies.)
- Spouse: Jarrett Morene (m. 2021)
- Children: 2
- Education: University of Florida (BA)
- Website: State House website Campaign website

Angela M. Nixon (born February 27, 1984) is an American politician and businesswoman who served as a member of the Florida House of Representatives from 2020 to 2026. A member of the Working Families Party and the Democratic Socialists of America, she was the Democratic nominee in the 2026 United States Senate special election in Florida, losing to Republican incumbent Ashley Moody.

== Early life and education ==
Nixon and her brother were raised in the Moncrief neighborhood of Jacksonville, Florida, by a single mother who worked two jobs to support the family. She attended Stanton College Preparatory School and graduated from the University of Florida in 2007 with a degree in political science.

In 2008, the year after graduating from college, Nixon ran unsuccessfully for the Jacksonville City Council. She went on to work as an aide to Mia Jones when Jones was the representative from the 14th district.

== Political career ==
=== Florida House of Representatives ===
In the 2020 elections, Nixon defeated incumbent Kimberly Daniels, who was seeking re-election to the Florida House of Representatives to represent District 14, covering part of Duval County, in the Democratic Party primary election.

In April 2022, Nixon attempted to stage a sit-in demonstration to prevent a vote on redistricting of Florida's congressional district maps. The demonstration was ultimately unsuccessful. Also in 2022, Nixon was redrawn from House District 14 to House District 13 due to once-in-a-decade redistricting. She went on to defeat unaffiliated candidate La'Ciara Masline (NPA), and ultimately replaced Tracie Davis as Florida State House representative for District 13.

In November 2023, Nixon introduced a resolution in the Florida House of Representatives, the lower chamber of the statewide legislature, that called for the release of the hostages Hamas retained and the de-escalation of the Israeli-Palestinian conflict. Nixon asked how many Palestinian deaths were enough; another state representative, Michelle Salzman, responded “all of them”. The Florida House of Representatives rejected the resolution with 2 votes in favor and 104 against.

The Florida House Rules and Ethics Committee reprimanded Nixon in May 2026 for blaring a megaphone during a congressional redistricting debate which she decried as illegal in April 2026. After the redrawn congressional maps were approved by governor Ron DeSantis, she staged a sit-in at DeSantis' office, asking to speak with the governor, and was arrested. The Democratic Party reprimanded the detention as a violation of the First Amendment. In September 2026, Nixon said that she was released under the condition of paying a mulct and fulfilling community service.

Nixon completed her third and final term in office on November 3, 2026, and was succeeded by Audrey Gibson.

=== 2026 U.S. Senate campaign ===
Nixon speaking at a Dolphin Democrats event in Wilton Manors, Florida.

On January 22, 2026, Nixon launched her campaign for the Democratic Party nomination in the 2026 United States Senate special election in Florida. She joined the Democratic Socialists of America (DSA) and Working Families Party (WFP) in 2026. Her campaign pledges included universal health care, (Note: Nixon is proposing Medicare for All for the reduction of healthcare costs, which she proposes as to be implemented incrementally.) higher taxes on the wealthy and a minimum wage of $25 per hour. She defeated Alex Vindman in the Florida senate primary in what was seen as a significant upset. After her primary victory, Nixon faced U.S. Sen. Ashley Moody, who was appointed by Gov. Ron DeSantis in 2025 to replace Marco Rubio, who became U.S. Secretary of State in the 2nd Trump administration. Nixon lost the race against incumbent candidate, Moody, as called on November 4.

Nixon was noted in national press along with US Senate candidates Juliana Stratton, Marquita Bradshaw, and Catherine Fleming Bruce, and gubernatorial candidate Keisha Lance Bottoms as notable Black women who ran in the 2026 general election.

After conceding the race to Moody, Nixon expressed openness on running again against her in the 2028 election.

Nixon was featured in the Root Magazine 100 class of 2026.

== Other ventures ==
=== Melanin Market ===
Nixon is the co-founder of the Melanin Market, an outdoor market which allows small business owners to sell healthy food options and connects residents to local resources.

=== Literary works ===
Nixon co-authored a book with her daughter, Natalie McGriff. When Natalie was seven, in response to her low self-esteem about her natural hair, Nixon suggested the two write a comic-style children's book about a girl whose Afro puffs transform her into a powerful superhero; this resulted in The Adventures of Moxie McGriff. The book was a winner at Florida's 2015 One Spark event, where they received enough funding to publish and tour the book, donating many copies to organizations that promote literacy.

=== Food industry ===
In 2019, Nixon, along with her daughter, opened a smoothie/ice cream/sandwich shop on the Eastside of Jacksonville called Natalie’s Nook & Candy Shop.

=== Book store ===
In 2024, Nixon founded a bookstore and coffee shop in Jacksonville's Northside called Cafe Resistance, which serves as a community-focused space for local organizing, after-school educational and recreational activities for children and students, and promoting Black history and culture through literature and storytelling, in opposition to state repression of historical accounts of African-American resistance.

=== Florida Public Service Union ===
Nixon is currently Director for the Florida Public Service Union's (FPSU) Higher Education Campaign and was previously the Florida state field director for the Service Employees International Union (SEIU), of which FPSU is an affiliate.

Since 2022, she has also been the executive director of Florida For All, a coalition of six different organizations, including SEIU, that works to promote voter rights and enfranchisement.

== Personal life ==
Nixon has two children from a previous relationship. Her first child was born shortly before she ran for Jacksonville City Council in 2008. In June 2021, she married Jarrett Morene who has three children from a previous marriage. Together, they have a blended family of five children.

== Political positions ==
Nixon is a member of the Working Families Party and the Democratic Socialists of America (DSA). She has been characterized as a progressive by several media outlets. In an interview with CBS Miami's Jim DeFede, Nixon identified as a social democrat.

=== Economic policy ===
Nixon has called to raise the federal minimum wage.

Nixon said she would vote to repeal the 2025 One Big Beautiful Bill Act (OBBBA). She has criticized OBBBA's impact on Medicaid, housing, and hospital programs, and its tax cuts on the wealthy.

In September 2026, Nixon stated that she supported a federal moratorium on new construction of data centers until regulatory guardrails were established to protect communities and the environment.

=== Foreign policy ===
Nixon is opposed to the 2026 Iran war. She criticized the war's cost, and said it was "jeopardizing the lives of American service members and Iranian civilians."

Nixon said in August 2026 that she would have voted to cut $3.3 billion in aid to Israel. She said, "We cannot continue to send money to countries that are violating international law, that are violating human rights."

When asked in a CBS interview whether Cuba is a dictatorship, Nixon said, "that is what people have told me, I have never been to Cuba, and so I will have to take their word for it." CBS posted on social media that Nixon "declined to say" that Cuba was a dictatorship, then deleted the post, saying it "did not accurately" portray Nixon's answer. In a statement to the Miami Herald, Nixon wrote "Throughout this campaign, I have spoken directly with thousands of Cubans who have shared deeply personal stories about their own experiences, or those of their families and loved ones, living under a brutal dictatorship."

=== Healthcare ===
Nixon supports a long-term plan to implement Medicare for All, a type of universal health care. Her short-term plan is to reintroduce the enhanced tax credit under the Affordable Care Act (ACA).

=== Immigration ===
Nixon said she supports border security as well as "clear and compassionate pathways for citizenship." Her 2026 campaign platform calls for abolishing ICE and rebuilding immigration enforcement.

=== Law enforcement ===
In an August 2026 interview, Nixon stated that she did not support defunding the police and did support "comprehensive criminal justice reform to make sure we are addressing some of the root causes of people leading into a life of crime." Nixon said she would end for-profit prisons, stating that they are an exploitative industry.

== Electoral history ==
Florida HD 14 map (2012 redistricting)

2020 Florida's 14th House District Primary Election
Party	Candidate	Votes	%
Democratic	Angie Nixon	14,076	59.8
Democratic	Kimberly Daniels	9,473	40.2
Total votes		23,549	100%

Since there were no other party nominees for the office, and the two persons who had discussed running as write-in candidates withdrew, the general election was cancelled and Nixon was declared the winner.

2022 Florida's 13th House District Primary Election
Party	Candidate	Votes	%
Democratic	Angie Nixon	16,803	88.6
Democratic	Delaine Smith	2,171	11.4
Total votes		18,974	100%

2022 Florida's 13th House District General Election
Party	Candidate	Votes	%
Democratic	Angie Nixon	34,059	70.8
Independent	La'Ciara Masline	14,035	29.2
Total votes		48,094	100%

2024 Florida's 13th House District Primary Election
Party	Candidate	Votes	%
Democratic	Angie Nixon	10,775	81.0
Democratic	Brenda A. Priestly Jackson	2,531	19.0
Total votes		13,306	100%

2024 Florida's 13th House District General Election
Party	Candidate	Votes	%
Democratic	Angie Nixon	55,806	99.7
Independent	Terry Jordan	149	0.3
Total votes		55,955	100%

2026 Florida U.S. Senate Primary Special Election
Party	Candidate	Votes	%
Democratic	Angie Nixon	705,835	56.1
Democratic	Alex Vindman	553,138	43.9
Total votes		1,258,973	100%

== Notes ==
Party political offices
Preceded by Val Demings	Democratic nominee for U.S. Senator from Florida (Class 3); 2026	Most recent
