= Tracie Davis =

American politician and former teacher

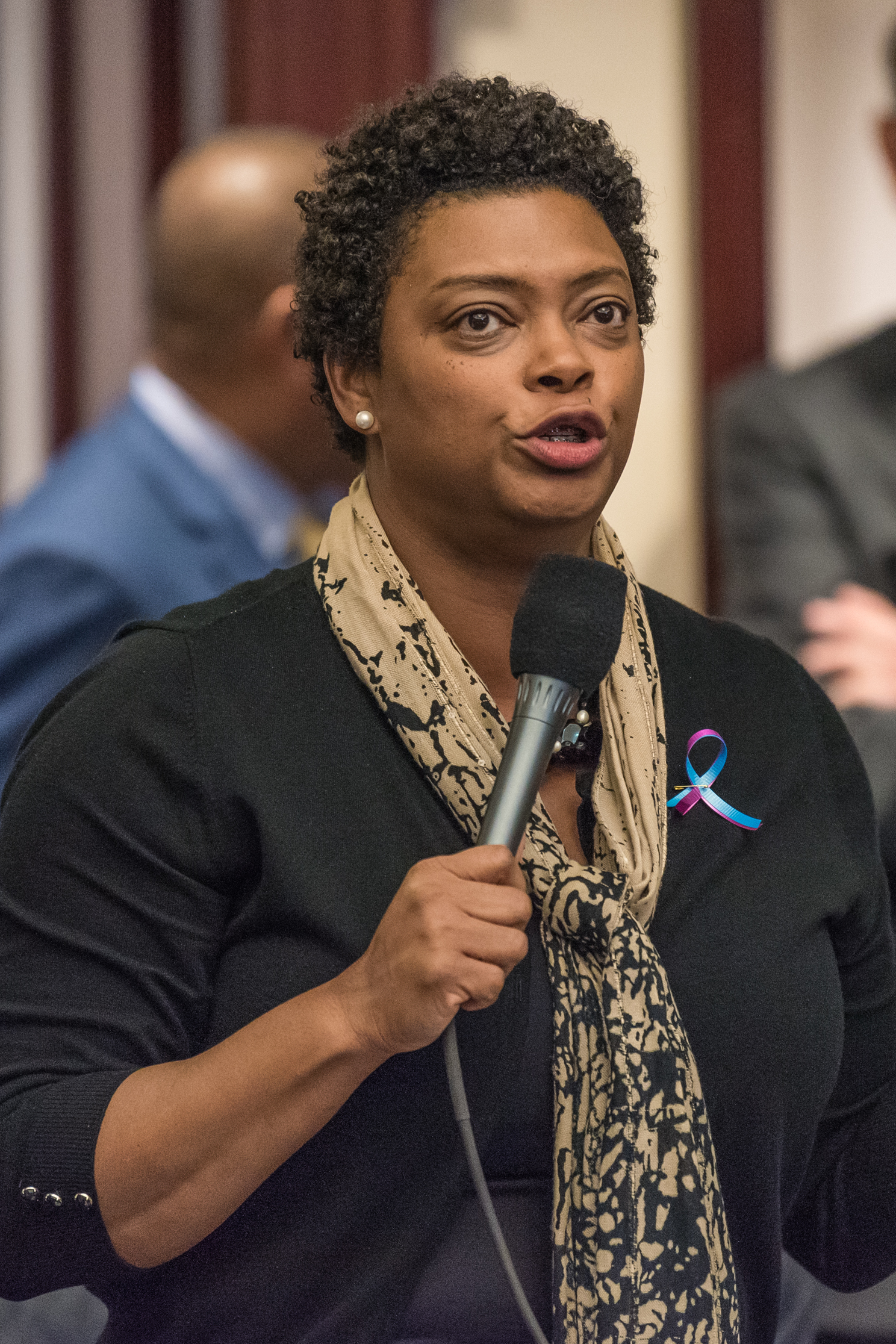

Member of the Florida Senate from the 5th district
- Incumbent
- Assumed office November 8, 2022
- Preceded by: Audrey Gibson (redistricted)

Member of the Florida House of Representatives from the 13th district
- In office November 8, 2016 – November 8, 2022
- Preceded by: Reggie Fullwood
- Succeeded by: Angie Nixon (redistricted)

Personal details
- Born: May 6, 1970 (age 56) Jacksonville, Florida, U.S.
- Party: Democratic
- Education: Edward Waters University (BS); University of North Florida (MEd)

Tracie Davis (born May 6, 1970) is an American politician and former teacher who currently serves as the Senator for District 5 in the Florida Senate as a member of the Democratic Party. After former Democratic representative Reggie Fullwood pleaded guilty to two counts of federal fraud, Davis was selected by the Duval County Democratic Party to replace him on the ticket for District 13 in the Florida House of Representatives.

Prior to her run, she was a special education teacher for Duval County Public Schools, and subsequently worked as the deputy supervisor of elections. She holds education degrees from University of North Florida and Edward Waters College.

She will be the leader of the Senate Democratic Caucus during the 2026–2028 term.
