= 2011 Jacksonville mayoral election =

- March 22, 2011 (blanket); May 17, 2011 (runoff)
- Turnout: 192,952 votes (Runoff)
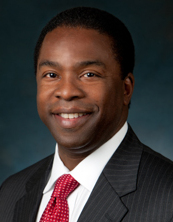

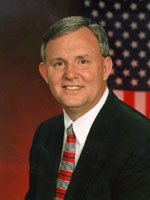
Candidate	Alvin Brown	Mike Hogan
Party	Democratic	Republican
First round	37,747; 24.73%	52,072; 34.12%
Second round	97,307; 50.43%	95,645; 49.57%
Candidate	Audrey Moran	Rick Mullaney
Party	Republican	Republican
First round	33,003; 21.62%	23,598; 15.46%
Mayor before election
John Peyton
Republican
Elected mayor
Alvin Brown
Democratic

The Jacksonville mayoral election of 2011 determined the Mayor of Jacksonville, Florida. A blanket primary with six candidates together on the same ballot took place March 22, 2011. Incumbent Republican Mayor John Peyton was term limited, and, as a result, could not seek reelection to a third term in office. As no candidate received a majority of the vote, a runoff election between the top two vote-getters, Republican Mike Hogan and Democrat Alvin Brown, took place on May 17, 2011. In a close race, Brown defeated Hogan to become Jacksonville's first African-American mayor.

The runoff saw Brown win the narrowest election in Jacksonville mayoral history. Brown had widely been considered an underdog.

== General election ==
Jacksonville Mayoral election, 2011
Party	Candidate	Votes	%
Republican	Mike Hogan	52,072	34.12%
Democratic	Alvin Brown	37,747	24.73%
Republican	Audrey Moran	33,003	21.62%
Republican	Rick Mullaney	23,598	15.46%
Democratic	Warren Lee	3,726	2.44%
Independent	Steve Irvine	2,120	1.39%
	Write-in	358	0.23%
Total votes		152,624	

== Runoff election ==
2011 Jacksonville mayoral election
Party	Candidate	Votes	%
Democratic	Alvin Brown	97,307	50.43%
Republican	Mike Hogan	95,645	49.57%
Total votes		192,952	100.00%
Democratic gain from Republican			
