= Florida's 13th House of Representatives district =

American legislative district

Florida's 13th State House of Representatives district
Representative
Audrey Gibson; D–Jacksonville
- Demographics: 40.4% White; 52.9% Black; 6.7% Hispanic; 1.9% Asian; 0.4% Native American; 0.1% Hawaiian/Pacific Islander; 1.9% Other
- Population (2010) • Voting age: 156,504; 119,339

Florida's 13th House district elects one member of the Florida House of Representatives. The district is represented by Angie Nixon. This district is located in Northeast Florida, and encompasses part of the First Coast, as well as the central part of the Jacksonville metropolitan area. The district covers central Duval County and Downtown Jacksonville, as well as the western half of the Arlington neighborhood. The district is located entirely within Jacksonville, though it only contains part of the city center. As of the 2010 Census, the district's population is 158,781. This district is majority-minority.

This district contains Florida State College at Jacksonville and Edward Waters College, located in Downtown Jacksonville, and Jacksonville University, located in the Arlington neighborhood.

There was a vacancy between November 4, 2014 and February 18, 2015. This vacancy occurred when incumbent Reggie Fullwood's reelection paperwork was rejected due to an error on his financial disclosure form. As he was the only candidate on the ballot, Florida Governor Rick Scott called for a special election to be held in February 2015. Fullwood won the special election to fill the seat.

There was a vacancy between October 3, 2016 and November 8, 2016 as the incumbent, Reggie Fullwood, resigned due after pleading guilty to wire fraud. Duval County Supervisor of Elections Tracie Davis won the general election to fill the seat.

== Representatives from 1967 to the present ==
Representatives by party affiliation
Party	Representatives
Democratic	9
Republican	4

#	Name	Term of service	Residence	Political party
1	Donald L. Tucker	1967–1972	Tallahassee	Democratic
2	Leon McDonald	1972–1974	Live Oak	Democratic
3	Pete Skinner	1974–1976	Lake City	Democratic
4	Wayne Hollingsworth	1976–1982	Lake City	Democratic
5	George Crady	1982–1992	Yulee	Democratic
6	Stephen Wise	1992–2000	Jacksonville	Republican
7	Mike Hogan	2000–2003	Jacksonville	Republican
8	Jennifer Carroll	2003–2010	Fleming Island	Republican
9	Daniel Davis	2010–2012	Jacksonville	Republican
10	Reggie Fullwood	2012–2014	Jacksonville	Democratic
	Vacant	2014-2015		
11	Reggie Fullwood	2015–2016	Jacksonville	Democratic
	Vacant	2016		
12	Tracie Davis	2016–2022	Jacksonville	Democratic
13	Angie Nixon	2022–Present	Jacksonville	Democratic

== See also ==
- Florida's 6th Senate district
- Florida's 4th congressional district
- Florida's 5th congressional district
