= Edith A. Perez =

American professor of medicine

- Born: Humacao, Puerto Rico
- Education: University of Puerto Rico, Río Piedras Campus (BS); University of Puerto Rico School of Medicine (MD)
- Scientific career
- Workplaces: Mayo Clinic Alix School of Medicine

Edith A. Perez, M.D., is an internationally renowned hematologist-oncologist and thought leader committed to advancing cancer drug development and improving patient care through health equity and access to innovative treatments. Perez has authored or co-authored more than 700 manuscripts and abstracts during her career. She lectures at national and international meetings, in addition to serving on the board of multiple academic journals, and holding leadership and advisory positions across academic, clinical, and industry settings. She is a Professor Emeritus at Mayo Clinic.

== Early life and education ==
Born in Humacao, Puerto Rico, Perez graduated magna cum laude with a B.S. in biology from the University of Puerto Rico. Perez earned her medical degree at the University of Puerto Rico School of Medicine, in San Juan. She later completed her residency in internal medicine at the Loma Linda University Medical Center, located in Loma Linda, California. Perez served in the National Health Service Corps for two years before completing a fellowship in hematology and oncology at the UC Davis School of Medicine. Perez then furthered her education by completing executive education programs at the Harvard Kennedy School and at the Wharton School of the University of Pennsylvania . She is board certified in internal medicine, medical oncology, and hematology.

== Industry career ==
In 2025, Perez cemented her role at Cornerstone Specialty Network upon accepting the role of chief medical officer, following her service as a Cornerstone medical advisory partner and key opinion speaker for several years. As chief medical officer, Perez plays a pivotal role in leading and expanding all Cornerstone Specialty Network’s clinical programs, evidence-based initiatives and collaborations with provider partners to empower community oncology practices and ultimately optimize patient care across the nation. In a 2014 interview, Perez emphasized the importance of global collaboration in the future of healthcare. Personally, she has worked with physicians practicing in various countries across Europe, Asian, Africa, and South America.

Prior to joining Cornerstone Specialty Network, Perez served as chief medical officer at Bolt Biotherapeutics (2020–2024) bringing her clinical and scientific expertise to direct the development of a novel immune-oncology pipeline. Perez was vice president of the BioOncology Medical Unit at Genentech (2015–2018), as well as a member of the Oncology Commercial Leadership Team, where she led the successful development and launch of multiple practice-changing and life-changing oncology therapeutics, including GAZYVA^{®}, PERJETA^{®}, ALECENSA^{®}, and TECENTRIQ^{®}. She was also a member of the Genentech/Roche Cancer Immunotherapy Governance Committee. Perez currently serves on scientific advisory committees for two early-stage biotech companies supporting their innovative efforts.

== Academic achievements ==
Throughout Perez’s continued tenure at Mayo Clinic, she has distinguished herself in the areas of teaching, research, patient care, and contributing to the treatment of breast cancer and the advancement of translational biomarkers. She was granted a Mayo-endowed professorship and was later promoted to deputy director at large for the Mayo Clinic Cancer Center. Global collaborations and funding from the National Cancer Institute (NCI), the National Institutes of Health (NIH), and various other foundations, including the Breast Cancer Research Foundation (BCRF), have been integral to her career. While she was working at the Mayo Clinic, Perez proved an asset to the N9831 trial, which demonstrated the impact of adding trastuzumab to improve disease-free and overall survival for patients with early-stage HER-2 positive breast cancer. The combination of chemotherapy and trastuzumab, as opposed to chemotherapy alone, was observed to improve the survival rate of breast cancer patients by 33%.

== Board of directors and advocacy work ==
Perez currently serves on the board of directors for the Food Allergy Research Foundation (FARE) and the Puerto Rico Science, Technology & Research Trust (PRSTRT). Most recently Perez, as part of the committee on strategies to better align investments in innovations for therapeutic development with disease burden and unmet needs, published a consensus study report in the National Academies of Sciences, Engineering, and Medicine 2025 titled Aligning Investments in Therapeutic Development with Therapeutic Need: Closing the Gap. Washington, DC: The National Academies Press.

Over her career, Perez has been a member of multiple National Cancer Institute committees, including the Board of Scientific Advisors (BSA) and the Clinical Trials and Translational Committee (CTAC). She has been a member of five National Academies (NASEM) Consensus Groups, contributing to groundbreaking reports including Improving Diversity Across the Clinical Trial and Research Ecosystem (2021–2023) and Strategies to Better Align Investments in Innovations for Therapeutic Development with Disease Burden and Unmet Needs (2024–2025). Perez served on the board of directors of Artiva Biotherapeutics (2022–2024) and has also been involved in diversity leadership and philanthropic initiatives with the American Society of Clinical Oncology (ASCO) and the American Association for Cancer Research (AACR), The DONNA Foundation, Stand Up to Cancer and the Komen Foundation.

== Personal life ==
In addition to her academic and biomedical industry pursuits, Perez co-founded The National Marathon to Finish Breast Cancer to raise funds for underserved women and genomics/immunologic translational cancer research. She participates in the marathon annually. More than 20,000 families have received assistance from the proceeds and more than $3.3 million has been raised for cancer research. The organization also operates events and programs for survivorship, education and awareness.
