= Jay Fant =

American politician

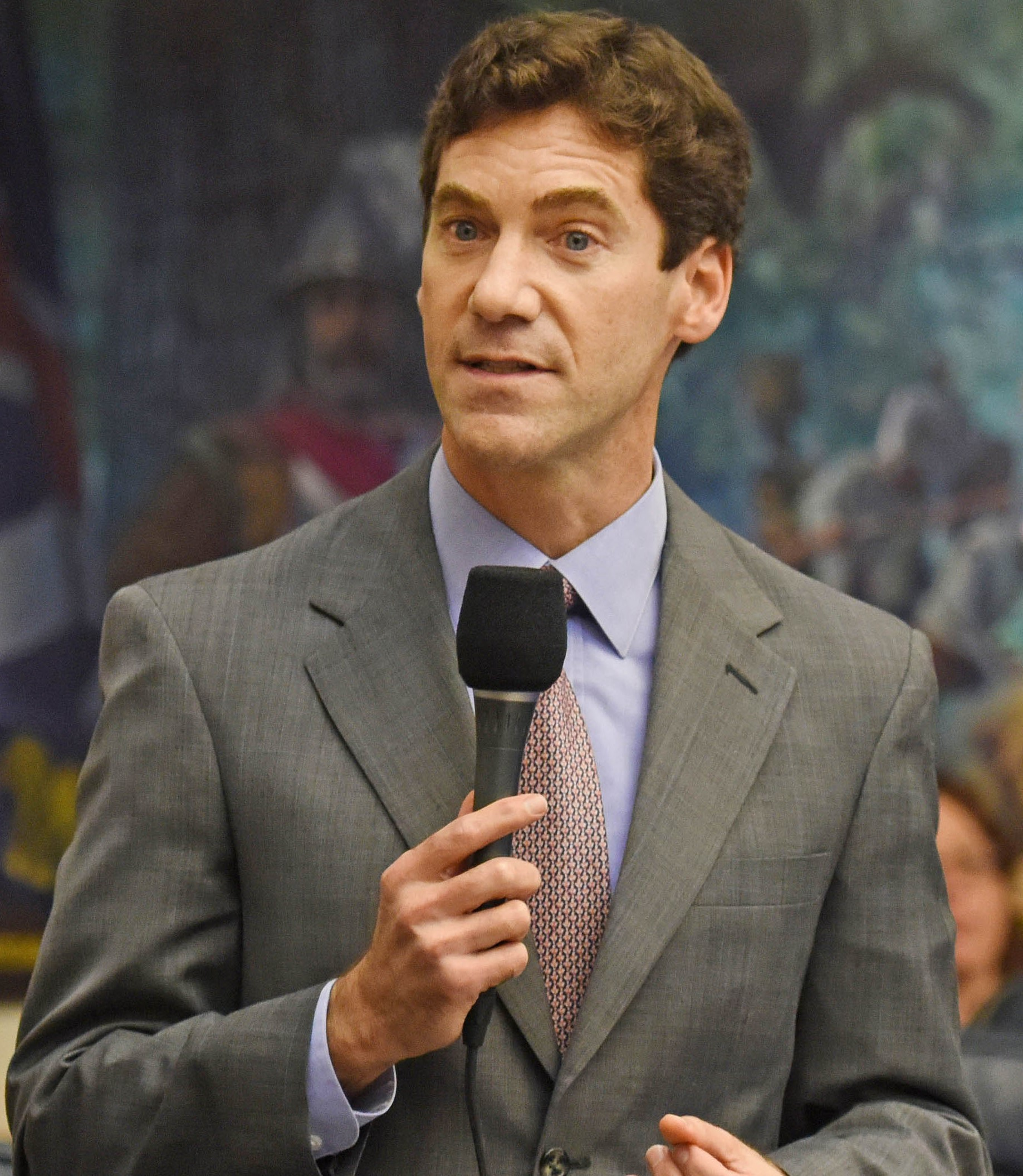

Member of the Florida House of Representatives from the 15th district
- In office November 4, 2014 – November 6, 2018
- Preceded by: Daniel Davis
- Succeeded by: Wyman Duggan

Personal details
- Born: March 28, 1968 (age 58) Jacksonville, Florida, U.S.
- Party: Republican
- Spouse: Lauren Lovett
- Children: 4
- Education: Washington and Lee University (BS); University of Florida (JD)

Julian E. "Jay" Fant (born March 28, 1968) is a Republican politician who formerly served as a member of the Florida House of Representatives, representing the 15th District, which includes parts of downtown Jacksonville in southern Duval County, from 2014 to 2018.

== Early life, education, and career ==
Fant was born in Jacksonville in 1968 to an established family; the Fant Family first moved to the area in 1920 and started First Guaranty Bank in 1947, which his father later ran. He attended Washington and Lee University, receiving his bachelor's degree in 1990, and then the University of Florida College of Law at the University of Florida, receiving his Juris Doctor in 1994.

Upon graduation in 1994, Fant returned home and was elected to serve on the board of First Guaranty Bank, and he began managing the operations of the company in 2001. Fant worked in trust administration and corporate management until 2003, when he was named president and chief executive officer of the bank. He remained president until 2009 when he was promoted to chairman. In 2010, Fant turned over daily management, and his employment with the bank came to a close in 2012. The bank had performed well earlier in Fant's leadership, but by 2012, the bank had failed because it had acquired a number of troubled loans and had received a number of poor financial stability ratings from independent firms, and it was in negotiations to be purchased by CertusBank. However, the Federal Deposit Insurance Corporation stepped in at that point and the bank went into FDIC receivership. Fant began working with CenterState, which ended up as the owner of First Guaranty Bank, as a senior legal counsel and on the advisory board.

Fant opposed the federal takeover of mortgage companies Fannie Mae and Freddie Mac in 2008 stating that they would become a long term taxpayer burden. He also opposed the government bailouts of larger banks at the expense of smaller banks like his that did not participate in sub-prime residential lending.

Fant was active in the Tea Party movement in 2009.

== Florida House of Representatives ==
=== 2014 election ===
Leading up to the 2014 elections, incumbent State Representative Daniel Davis declined to seek a third term in the legislature. In October 2013, Fant announced his candidacy for his seat. He faced attorney Paul Renner in the Republican primary, and both candidates agreed on the need to expand the Port of Jacksonville, to attract jobs to the state, and to provide more school choice to parents. Fant also called for increased assistance and incentives to veterans, noting, "I have a proposal that would encourage vets, when they come back and retire from the military, to start their businesses in Florida, and they'll get some breaks on the licensing fees to do that." During the campaign, Fant incorrectly claimed endorsements from the NRA Political Victory Fund (NRA-PVF) and Florida Right to Life, neither of which had made an endorsement in the primaries, though they gave both candidates "A" ratings. Fant's campaign corrected the video, which the candidate had made during an interview with The Florida Times-Union's editorial board. The NRA-PVF later endorsed Fant in the general election.

Ultimately, the primary contest proved to be close and hard-fought, with Fant finishing just three votes ahead of Renner, prompting a manual recount. The recount lowered Fant's margin to just two votes but uncovered no additional errors, and Renner conceded to him. Renner was elected to the Florida House in another district a few months later.

In the general election, Fant faced only write-in opposition, and easily won his first term in the legislature with nearly 100% of the vote.

=== Tenure ===
During his tenure, Fant sat on the House Judiciary Committee, Criminal Justice Subcommittee, Finance & Tax Committee, Government Operations Subcommittee, Insurance & Banking Subcommittee, Education Committee, Government Accountability Committee, Government Operations & Technology Appropriations Subcommittee, Justice Appropriations Subcommittee, Local, Federal and Veterans Affairs Subcommittee, Ways and Means Committee and Civil Justice & Claims Subcommittee.

Fant sponsored a bill to improve access to online property especially in the management of wills and estates. It ultimately became law. Fant supported the Enterprise Florida and Visit Florida programs. He opposed gun control laws.

In 2017 Fant declared his candidacy for Attorney General in the upcoming election, but he withdrew in June 2018.

== Personal life ==
Fant is married and has four children. From 2006 through 2008 Fant led the All Pro Dad Experience in Jacksonville, which sought to strengthen the relationship between fathers and their children. He also volunteered in Big Brothers/Big Sisters of Northeast Florida.
