= Daniel Davis (Florida politician) =

American politician

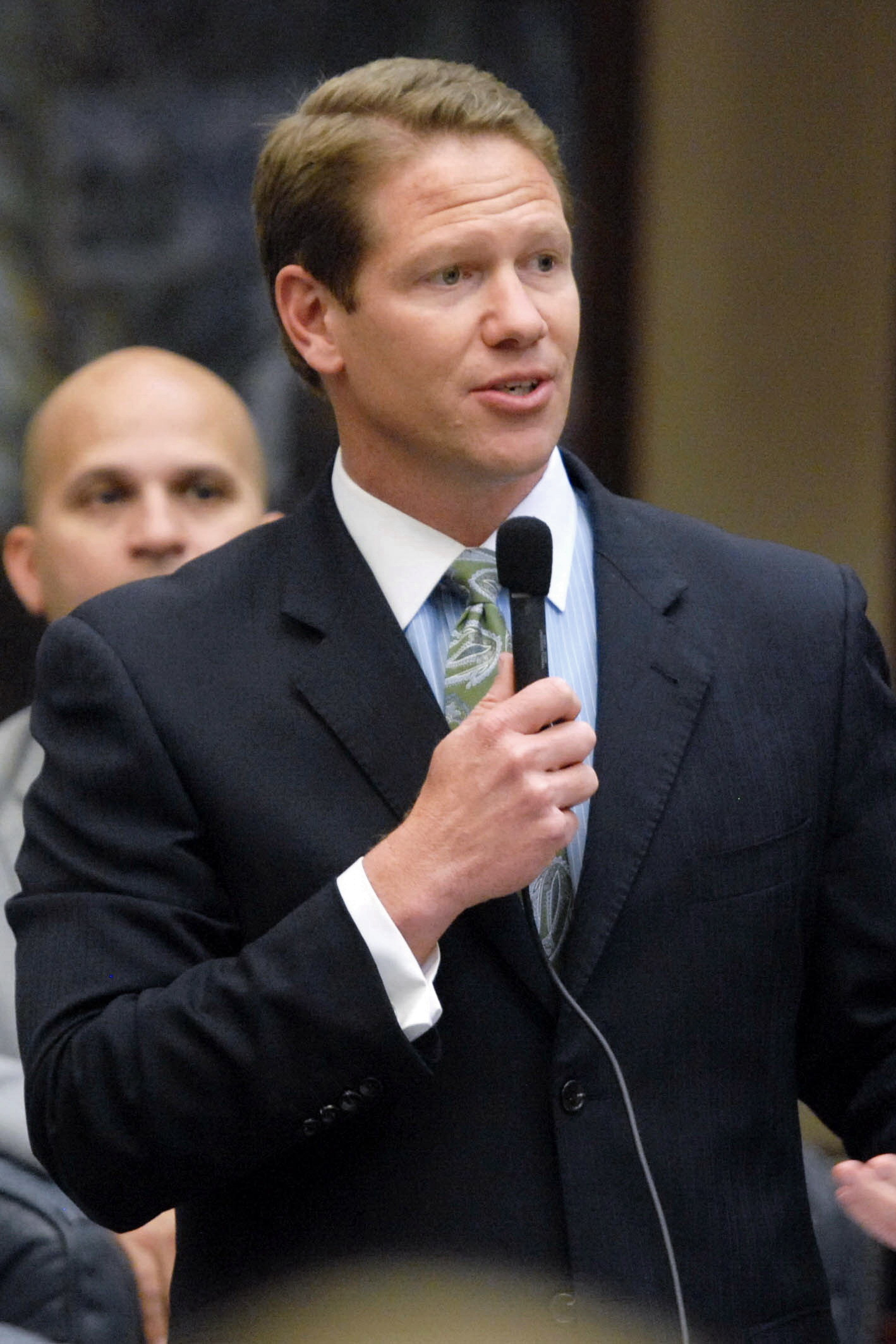

Member of the Florida House of Representatives
- In office November 2, 2010 – November 4, 2014
- Preceded by: Reggie Fullwood
- Succeeded by: Jay Fant
- Constituency: 13th district (2010–2012); 15th district (2012–2014)

President of the Jacksonville City Council
- In office June 28, 2007 – June 26, 2008
- Preceded by: Michael Corrigan
- Succeeded by: Ronnie Fussell

Member of the Jacksonville City Council from the 12th district
- In office 2003–2010
- Preceded by: Doyle Carter
- Succeeded by: Doyle Carter

Personal details
- Born: January 15, 1973 (age 53) South Bend, Indiana, U.S.
- Party: Republican
- Spouse: Rebekah Pendleton
- Children: 4
- Education: Maranatha Baptist University (BS)

Daniel Davis (born January 15, 1973) is an American politician and former Republican member of the Florida House of Representatives from 2010 to 2014, representing the 13th District from 2010 to 2012 and the 15th District from 2012 to 2014.

== History ==
Davis was born in South Bend, Indiana and moved to Florida in 1979. He attended Maranatha Baptist University in Watertown, Wisconsin, where he graduated with a degree in business. From 2003 to 2010, Davis served on the Jacksonville City Council, and he was selected as the President of the council from 2007 to 2008.

== Florida House of Representatives ==
In 2010, incumbent Republican state representative Jennifer Carroll, who represented the 13th District, which included parts of Clay County and Duval County, was unable to seek re-election due to term limits and was selected by Rick Scott, the Republican nominee for governor, as his running mate. Davis ran to succeed Carroll, and won the nomination of the Republican Party and the general election unopposed.

Florida House districts were redrawn in 2012, and Davis was redrawn into the 15th District, which included most of the territory that he had represented in the 13th District. Once again, he won both the nomination of his party and the general election unopposed, and was sworn in for his second term in the House.

While serving in the Florida House of Representatives, Davis worked with State Senator Jeff Brandes to repeal legislation that required "foreign visitors to obtain a special driving permit" before being allowed to drive on Florida roads, which was signed by Governor Rick Scott on April 2, 2013. Additionally, he also sponsored legislation that would "prohibit the state Department of Health from inspecting the septic systems of homes that are getting additions," which prompted criticism from those who asserted that the legislation would lead to increased water use.

Though he was eligible to run for re-election in 2014 and was considered a potential candidate for Mayor of Jacksonville in 2015, he declined to seek re-election or to run for mayor following his appointment as the president of the Jacksonville Chamber of Commerce, and he finished out his second term in the legislature.

Davis ran for Jacksonville mayor in the March 21, 2023 election. Davis lost the runoff election on May 16 to Democrat Donna Deegan, with Deegan taking office July 1, 2023. On April 3, 2023, Davis ran an attack ad against Deegan, claiming that she attended "all the Black Lives Matter demonstrations in Jacksonville after the 2020 death of George Floyd." Deegan has responded that "she's pro-police and would hire more officers if she is elected mayor" and that "she does not plan to launch any attack ads against Davis."
