= Jennifer Carroll =

American politician (born 1959)

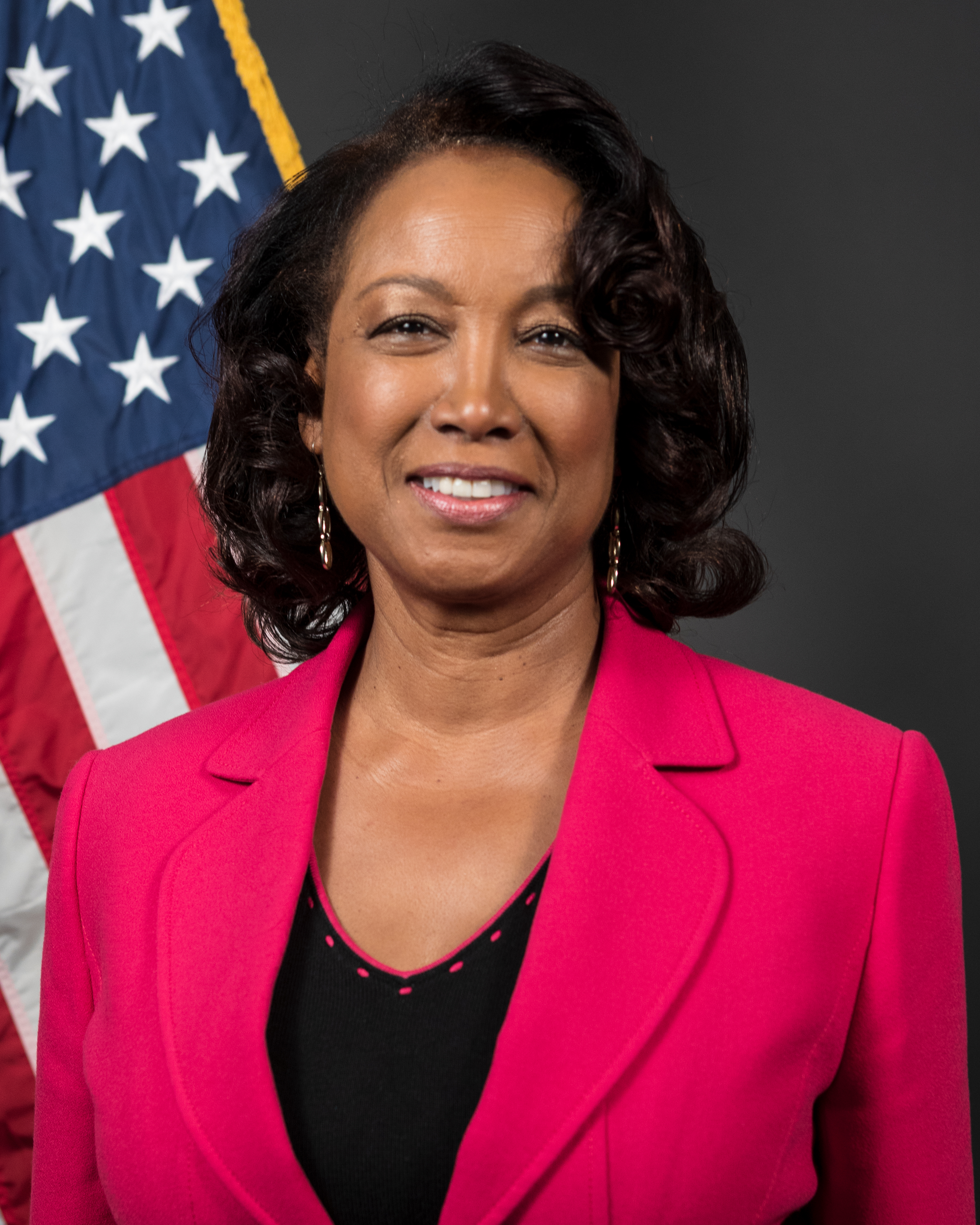
- Official portrait, 2018

United States Ambassador to Trinidad and Tobago
- Nominee
- Assuming office TBD
- President: Donald Trump
- Succeeding: Philip Kern (chargé d'affaires)

18th Lieutenant Governor of Florida
- In office January 4, 2011 – March 12, 2013
- Governor: Rick Scott
- Preceded by: Jeff Kottkamp
- Succeeded by: Carlos Lopez-Cantera

Member of the Florida House of Representatives from the 13th district
- In office May 13, 2003 – November 2, 2010
- Preceded by: Mike Hogan
- Succeeded by: Daniel Davis

Personal details
- Born: Jennifer Sandra Johnson; August 27, 1959 (age 67) Port of Spain, Trinidad and Tobago
- Party: Republican
- Spouse: Nolan Carroll
- Children: 3, including Nolan
- Education: Leeward Community College (AA); University of New Mexico (BA); Kensington University (MBA); St. Leo University (MBA)

Military service
- Branch/service: United States Navy
- Years of service: 1979–1999
- Rank: Lieutenant Commander

Jennifer Sandra Carroll (née Johnson, August 27, 1959) is an American Republican politician and retired naval officer who served as the 18th lieutenant governor of Florida from January 4, 2011 to March 12, 2013. Carroll is the first black person, woman and Trinidadian-American elected to the office. Carroll previously served as a Republican member of the Florida House of Representatives. She is the bestselling author of an autobiography entitled When You Get There. In June 2026, she was nominated to be the U.S. Ambassador to Trinidad and Tobago by President Donald Trump.

While lieutenant governor, Carroll came under scrutiny for public relations work for a charity that involved itself in gambling and for $24,000 in income that she failed to report on financial disclosures and tax returns. At Governor Rick Scott's request, Carroll resigned her lieutenant governor post on March 12, 2013. The Florida Department of Law Enforcement subsequently concluded that she had not broken any laws.

== Early life, education, and career ==
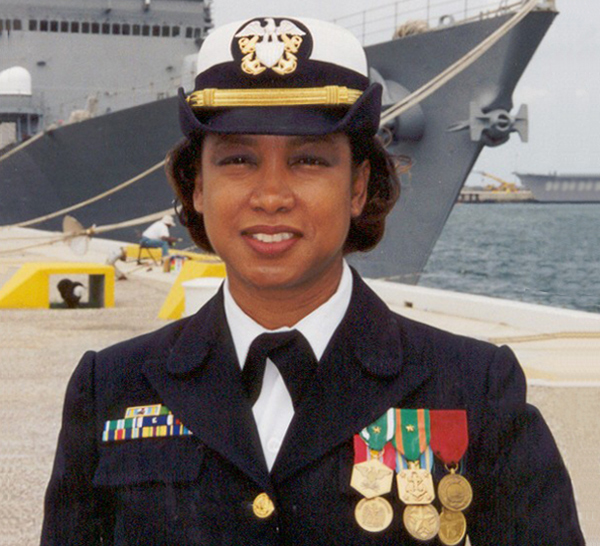
Carroll as a U.S. Navy officer.

Carroll was born in Port of Spain, Trinidad and Tobago. She moved to the United States at the age of eight, and graduated from Uniondale High School in Uniondale, New York in 1977. She enlisted in the U.S. Navy in 1979. After serving as an aviation machinist's mate (jet engine mechanic), she was selected for the Enlisted Commissioning Program, becoming an Aviation Maintenance Duty Officer in 1985. She retired from the U.S. Navy in 1999 as a lieutenant commander.

In 1981, she received an Associate of Arts degree from Leeward Community College. She followed this in 1985 with a Bachelor of Arts in political science from the University of New Mexico. She moved to Florida in 1986. She received a Master of Business Administration degree from unaccredited and now defunct Kensington University in 1995. Carroll resigned from her National Commission of Presidential Scholars position to accept a presidential appointment to the Veterans' Disability Benefits Commission. She then returned to school to earn an accredited Master of Business Administration degree online from St. Leo University in 2008.

Following the 2000 elections, Carroll was appointed Executive Director of the Florida Department of Veterans Affairs by Republican Governor Jeb Bush and served in that post until July 2002. Republican President George W. Bush appointed Carroll to the Commission on Presidential Scholars from 2001 to 2004, and then a seat on the Veterans' Disability Benefits Commission from 2004 to 2007.

== Political career ==
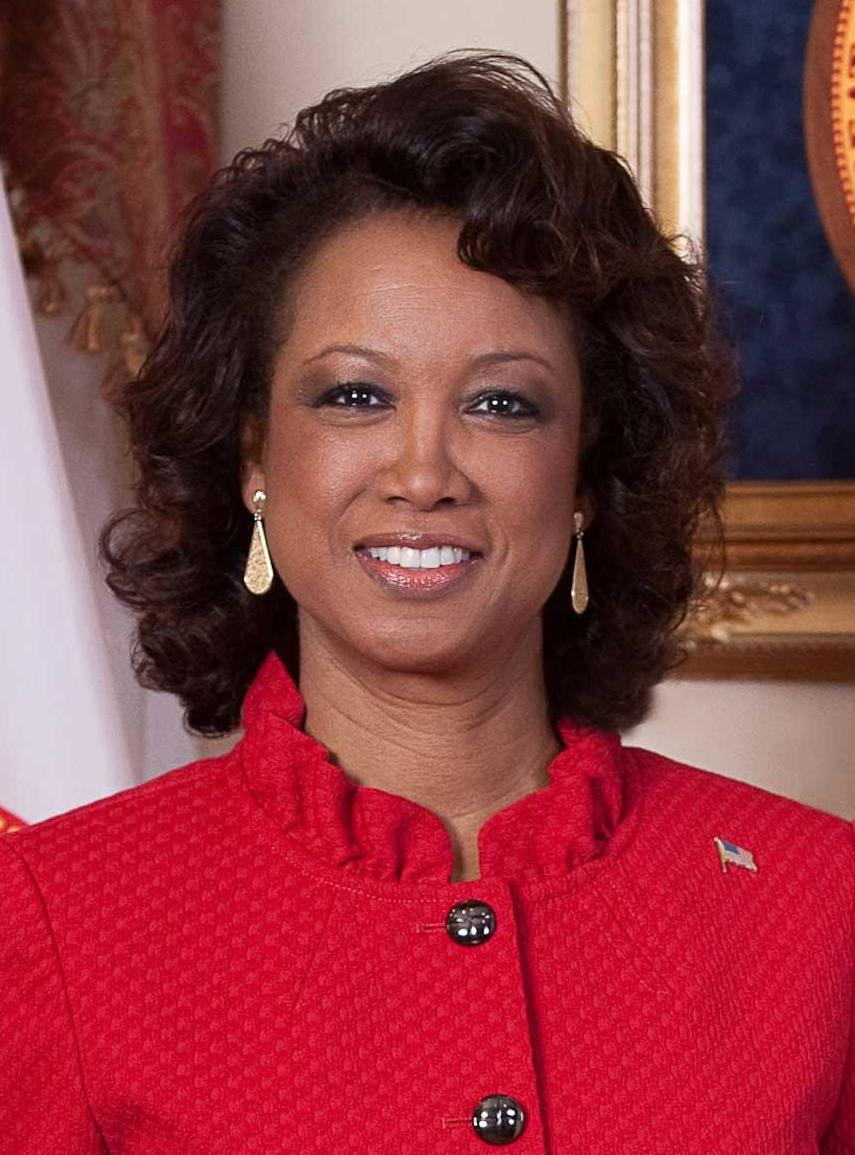
Carroll's official Lt. Governor portrait

Carroll is a member of the Clay County Republican Executive Committee. In 2000, she ran for a seat in the U.S. House of Representatives in the Florida's 3rd congressional district. Incumbent Democratic U.S. Congresswoman Corrine Brown defeated Carroll 58%–42%. After redistricting, she ran for a rematch against Brown in the newly redrawn 3rd district in 2002. Brown defeated her 59%–41%.

Carroll is one of the founders of Maggie's List, a federal PAC that supports conservative female candidates.

=== Florida House of Representatives ===
Carroll ran for a seat Florida House of Representatives in the 13th state House district after incumbent State Representative Mike Hogan, also a Republican, resigned in 2003. In the April 2003 special election, she won the Republican primary with 65.5 percent of the vote, defeating Linda Sparks, who won 34.5 percent of the vote. She became the first Black female Republican ever elected to the Florida Legislature. She won unopposed in 2004, 2006, and 2008.

Carroll was appointed Deputy Majority Leader from 2003–2004 and served as Majority Whip from 2004–2006. She was Vice Chair of the Transportation and Economic Development Committee (2003–2004), Chair of the Finance Committee (2006–2008) and Chair of the Economic and Development Council (2008–2010).

=== Lieutenant Governor of Florida ===
On November 2, 2010, the Republican ticket of Rick Scott and Jennifer Carroll defeated the Democratic ticket of Alex Sink and Rod Smith, 48.9%–47.7%. The first black person, the first woman, and the first Trinidadian American elected to the position, she assumed the office on January 4, 2011. Carroll was the first black Republican elected to statewide office in Florida since Reconstruction.

She had a troubled relationship with Governor Scott concerning various office mismanagement charges, including retaliation on staff, tax improprieties, and lesbianism.

Carroll came under further scrutiny for public relations work for a charity involving illegal online gambling and for $24,000 in income, which she failed to report on disclosures and tax returns. Though the Ethics Committee found no evidence of wrongdoing, at the request of Governor Rick Scott, Carroll resigned her post as lieutenant governor on March 12, 2013. The Florida Department of Law Enforcement subsequently concluded that she did not break any laws.

=== Later political career ===
Carroll served as a surrogate for Donald Trump during his 2016 presidential campaign, speaking at his rallies and serving on his National Diversity Council. In December 2017, Trump appointed Carroll as a Commissioner on the American Battle Monuments Commission. Carroll served on the Commission from April 2018 until January 2021.

== Personal life ==
Carroll's husband is Nolan Carroll, a retired senior master sergeant in the United States Air Force. Together, the Carrolls have three children. Carroll's son, Nolan Carroll II, has played football at the collegiate and professional levels.

== See also ==
- List of female lieutenant governors in the United States
- List of minority governors and lieutenant governors in the United States

Party political offices
Preceded by Jeff Kottkamp	Republican nominee for Lieutenant Governor of Florida; 2010	Succeeded by Carlos Lopez-Cantera
Political offices
Preceded by Jeff Kottkamp	Lieutenant Governor of Florida; 2011–2013	Succeeded by Carlos Lopez-Cantera
