= LeAnna Cumber =

American politician

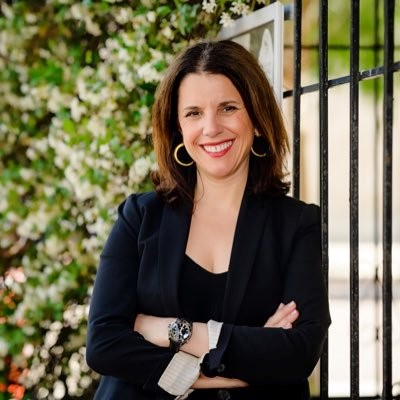
- Cumber in 2022

Member of the Jacksonville City Council from the 5th district
- In office July 1, 2019 – June 30, 2023
- Preceded by: Lori Boyer
- Succeeded by: Joe Carlucci

Personal details
- Born: February 3, 1973 (age 53) Cleveland, Ohio, U.S.
- Party: Republican
- Spouse: Husein Cumber
- Children: 2
- Education: University of Texas at Austin (BA); University of Southern California Gould School of Law (JD)

LeAnna Maria Gutierrez Cumber (born February 3, 1973) is an American politician, lawyer and former teacher who served as a member of the Jacksonville City Council in Florida. Cumber previously served as a legislative counselor for the Office of Inspector General for the Department of Transportation during the Presidency of George W. Bush.

== Early life and education ==
Cumber was raised in Ann Arbor, Michigan. While still in high school, she focused on issues involving rape and domestic violence.

She attended the University of Texas at Austin where she earned her Bachelor of Arts degree in government, moved to Nacogdoches, Texas and worked at a shelter for battered women. She later procured a position with the Nacogdoches Independent School District as a third-grade bilingual teacher. She also taught school for two years in rural east Texas, and then moved to Los Angeles and procured a position with the Los Angeles Unified School District as a fifth-grade bilingual teacher.

In 2001, Cumber received her Juris Doctor degree from the USC Gould School of Law. While in law school, she worked with prisoners in the California Institute for Women, and federal maximum and minimum security facilities. She represented clients in civil matters ranging from child custody to parole hearings.

Cumber's husband Husein is the Chief Strategy Officer for Florida East Coast Industries, LLC. (FECI). FECI is one of Florida's largest commercial real estate, transportation and infrastructure companies.

== Career ==
After graduation from law school, Cumber went to work for the California Women’s Law Center where she advocated for policy changes in domestic violence and family law before moving to Washington, D.C. in 2002 where she began a career focused on transportation and homeland security policy. She is a member of the bar in both Washington, D.C. and California.

Cumber began her legal career as a staffer in the United States Senate, and for the Office of the Inspector General (U.S. Department of Transportation). She also worked for Baker Botts LLP prior to starting a business of her own.

Since 2010, Cumber has been the CEO of LeAnna Cumber & Associates, a transportation-consulting firm that provides assistance to private transportation companies and state and local governments in securing public grants and financing.

In 2024, she joined Herzog, a leading rail and heavy/highway contractor across North America, as Chief Strategy Officer. In this role, she will work to "expand the organization's capabilities and reach, including assisting customers with obtaining project financing."

== City legislation ==
LeAnna was elected to the Jacksonville City Council, representing District 5, in January 2019 with no opposition and assumed office on July 1, 2019. Her term ended June 30, 2023. She served on the Finance, Transportation, Energy & Utilities Committees, and Neighborhoods, Community Services, Public Health, and Safety Committees.

Cumber sponsored a city ordinance to prevent human trafficking in Jacksonville. City leaders believe their city is a center for human trafficking as a result of its location. The ordinance requires all adult entertainment performers to be at least 21 years old and have a specific Performer Work ID. It also strongly encourages hotels and motels to post Human Trafficking Awareness information in every room. It created a sex trafficking survivors commission to advise the city on ways to eradicate sex trafficking in Jacksonville.

In September 2019, in response to rising levels of crime in and around the City’s internet cafes, Cumber presented legislation calling for all simulated gambling devices to be declared illegal immediately. The bill passed in October 2019. Protestors took to the streets in San Marco carrying signs and calling for then Mayor Lenny Curry "to reverse his decision on adult arcade closures". They also demanded the resignation of Councilwoman Cumber. One protestor called it "political corruption with special interests" and that it was "a direct attack on minority workers."

Cumber also sponsored a bill to create a pilot program establishing a permitting process for dockless mobility vehicles, such as electric bicycles and scooters.

Cumber also wrote and passed the legislation to create Jacksonville's Public Nuisance Abatement Board.

== 2023 Mayoral campaign ==
In March 2022, Cumber announced a formal run for Mayor of Jacksonville. She lost the election in March 2023. In August 2023, Cumber was appointed by Florida House Speaker Paul Renner to the Board of Governors of the Citizens Property Insurance Corporation.
