= Mike Langton =

American politician

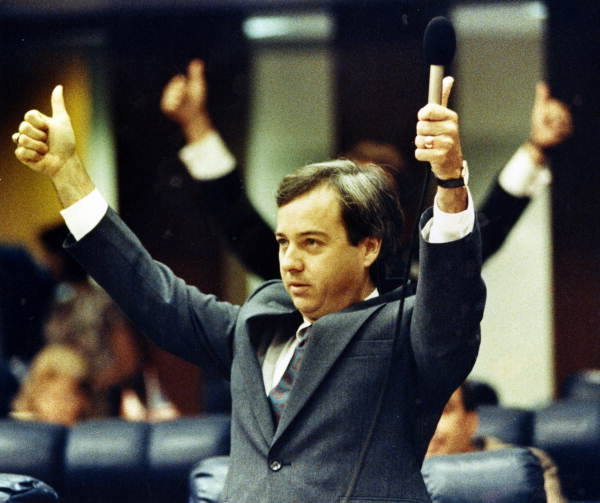
- Langton in 1990

Member of the Florida House of Representatives from the 15th district
- In office October 22, 1985 – November 3, 1992
- Preceded by: Steve Pajcic
- Succeeded by: Stephen Wise (redistricting)

Personal details
- Born: June 10, 1949 (age 77) Bronx, New York, U.S.
- Party: Democratic
- Education: Florida Atlantic University

Mike Langton (born June 10, 1949) is an American politician. He served as a Democratic member for the 15th district of the Florida House of Representatives.

== Life and career ==
Langton was born in Bronx, New York. He attended Florida Atlantic University.

In 1985, after State Representative Steve Pajcic resigned from the State House to focus on his gubernatorial campaign, Langton was elected to succeed him in a special election in the 15th district of the Florida House of Representatives. He served until 1992, when he declined to seek another term after his district was merged with Republican Stephen Wise's district. He was succeeded in the 15th district by Willye Dennis.

Florida House of Representatives
Preceded by Steve Pajcic	Member of the Florida House of Representatives from the 15th district 1986–1992	Succeeded by Willye Dennis
