= Senator Bankhead =

Senator Bankhead may refer to:

== Members of the United States Senate ==
- John H. Bankhead (1842–1920), U.S. senator from Alabama
- John H. Bankhead II (1872–1946), U.S. senator from Alabama

== United States state senate members ==
- Bill Bankhead (1941–2005), Florida State Senate
