= Darryl Boyer =

American politician

Personal details
- Born: 1999 (age 26–27)
- Party: Republican
- Education: Florida State University (MS)

Darryl L. Boyer (born 1999) is an American politician and conservative activist serving as secretary of the Flagler County, Florida Republican Party since 2022. He was a candidate in the Republican primary for the Florida House of Representatives in 2024.

== Education ==
In 2024, Boyer received his master's degree from Florida State University.

== Career ==
In 2022, Boyer worked on the successful Florida Senate campaign of Corey Simon.

In November 2022, Boyer helped launch Perspective PAC, a political action committee designed to promote minority leaders within the American conservative movement.

In December 2022, Boyer was elected secretary of the Flagler County Republican Party Executive Committee.

From December 2022 to May 2023, Boyer worked as a legislative aide to State Representative Webster Barnaby. He also worked as travel aide for Speaker Paul Renner.

In April 2024, Boyer was selected to serve as a Florida delegate to the 2024 Republican National Convention, voting for Donald Trump and JD Vance.

=== 2024 Florida House election ===
In November 2023, Boyer announced his candidacy to succeed Renner in 2024. His campaign was endorsed by former Alaska governor Sarah Palin, Florida state representatives Webster Barnaby and Paula Stark, former St. Johns County sheriff David Shoar, and Andrew Giuliani, son of Rudy Giuliani and candidate for governor of New York in 2022.

Boyer was defeated in a landslide in the August primary, by U.S. Navy officer Samuel Greco, who went on to win the general election.

== Personal life ==
Boyer lives in Palm Coast, Florida.
