= Bob Saunders (politician) =

American politician (1929–2006)

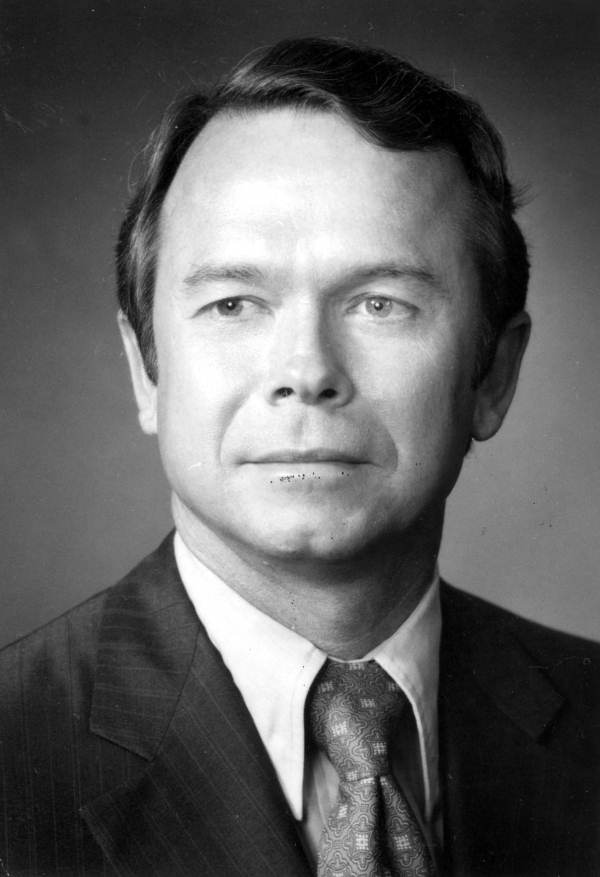

Member of the Florida Senate from the 5th district
- In office November 5, 1968 – November 2, 1976
- Preceded by: J. Emory Cross
- Succeeded by: Pete Skinner

Personal details
- Born: January 22, 1929 Quitman, Georgia
- Died: October 23, 2006 (aged 77) Gainesville, Florida
- Party: Democratic
- Spouse: Milly Johns
- Children: 2
- Education: University of Florida (A.A.)
- Occupation: Gasoline jobber, real estate

Military service
- Allegiance: United States
- Branch/service: United States Navy

Robert Saunders (January 22, 1929 – October 23, 2006) was a Democratic politician from Florida who served as a member of the Florida Senate from the 5th district from 1968 to 1976.

Saunders was born in Quitman, Georgia and came to Florida in 1938. He served in the Florida Senate from 1969 to 1971, as well as 1973 to 1976. He was a member of the Democratic Party. He owned several gas stations, cemeteries, and a funeral home. Saunders died at his home on October 23, 2016, at the age of 87.
