= Bill Grant (Florida politician) =

American politician (born 1943)

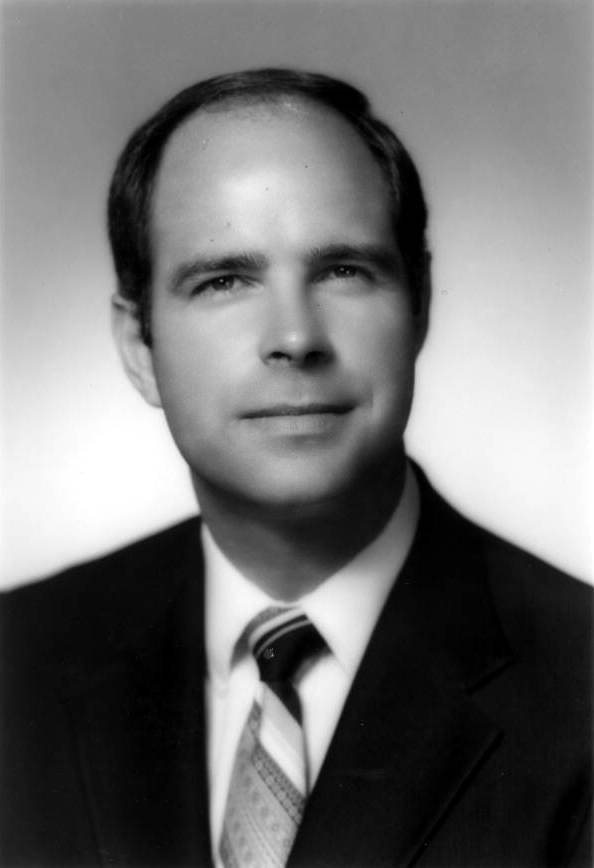

Member of the U.S. House of Representatives from Florida's 2nd district
- In office January 3, 1987 – January 3, 1991
- Preceded by: Don Fuqua
- Succeeded by: Pete Peterson

Member of the Florida Senate from the 5th district
- In office November 2, 1982 – November 4, 1986
- Preceded by: Pete Skinner
- Succeeded by: Wayne Hollingsworth

Personal details
- Born: James William Grant; September 21, 1943 (age 82) Lake City, Florida, U.S.
- Party: Democratic (before 1989); Republican (1989–present)
- Education: Florida State University (BA); University of Florida (attended)

James William "Bill" Grant (born September 21, 1943) is an American banker and former politician from Madison, Florida. From 1987 to 1991, he served two terms in the United States House of Representatives.

== Biography ==
A graduate of Florida State University, he attended the University of Florida for graduate studies. He is a fifth generation Floridian whose family has lived in North Florida since before statehood. He is a former Member of the Florida State Senate and the United States Congress and his party’s nominee to the U.S. Senate. Prior to beginning his political career, he organized and ran several North Florida commercial banks and was twice elected president of the Florida Bankers Association.

=== Congress ===
He represented Florida's 2nd congressional district in the U.S. Congress from 1987 to 1991. After being elected as a Democrat from the Tallahassee-based 2nd District to succeed 12-term Democrat Don Fuqua, he switched parties to become a Republican on February 21, 1989.

He was defeated for reelection in 1990 by businessman and Vietnam veteran Pete Peterson. Grant then ran unsuccessfully for the Senate in 1992, losing to incumbent Bob Graham.

=== Later career ===
After leaving politics, he organized and is now CEO of MK Meridian, Inc, an international conflict resolution, trade, and diplomatic advisory firm. In that capacity, he has mediated numerous sovereign and commercial conflicts across Eastern Europe, the Middle East and Africa. He helped organize the United Africa Association, a 13-nation effort for promoting pan-African self-help, free-enterprise capitalism, and democracy.

In 1997, with the assistance of the government of Egypt, he negotiated the end to the first Somali civil war and authored a draft constitutional government for that nation. He has been the senior advisor to two sovereign foreign governments and twice served as Special United States Congressional Envoy to international trouble spots. He served as Executive Vice President of Worldwide Chemical, LLC, a multi-faceted chemical production facility in Ukraine with 11,000 employees and a worldwide market.

== Family ==
Grant is married to the former Janet Krawiec. They have two children. Grant also has two children from a previous marriage.

== See also ==
- List of American politicians who switched parties in office
- List of United States representatives who switched parties

U.S. House of Representatives
Preceded by Don Fuqua	Member of the U.S. House of Representatives from Florida's 2nd congressional district 1987–1991	Succeeded by Pete Peterson
Party political offices
Preceded by Paula Hawkins	Republican nominee for U.S. Senator from Florida (Class 3); 1992	Succeeded by Charlie Crist
U.S. order of precedence (ceremonial)
Preceded by Dave Trott as Former U.S. Representative	Order of precedence of the United States as Former U.S. Representative	Succeeded by Craig James as Former U.S. Representative
