= Pete Skinner =

American politician (1942–2005)

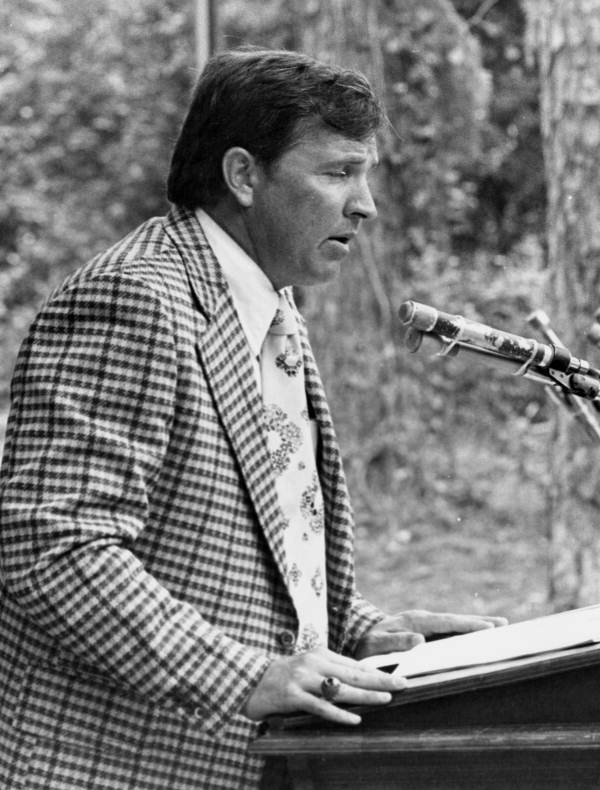

Member of the Florida Senate from the 5th district
- In office November 2, 1976 – November 2, 1982
- Preceded by: Bob Saunders
- Succeeded by: Bill Grant

Member of the Florida House of Representatives from the 13th district
- In office November 5, 1974 – November 2, 1976
- Preceded by: Leon McDonald
- Succeeded by: Wayne Hollingsworth

Personal details
- Born: November 12, 1942 McAlpin, Florida, U.S.
- Died: November 3, 2005 (aged 62) Lake City, Florida, U.S.
- Party: Democratic
- Spouse: Marcia Tucker
- Children: 2
- Education: University of Florida (B.A.)

Military service
- Allegiance: United States
- Branch/service: United States Marine Corps

Sherrill N. "Pete" Skinner (November 12, 1942 – November 3, 2005) was an American politician from Florida. A member of the Democratic Party, he served as a member of the Florida House of Representatives from the 13th district from 1974 to 1976 and as a member of the Florida Senate from the 5th district from 1976 to 1982.

== Life and career ==
Skinner was born in McAlpin, Florida. He attended the University of Florida.

In 1974, Skinner was elected to represent the 13th district of the Florida House of Representatives, succeeding Leon McDonald. He served until 1976, when he was succeeded by Wayne Hollingsworth. In the same year, he was elected to represent the 5th district of the Florida Senate, serving until 1982.

Skinner died on November 3, 2005, at the age of 62.
