= Sherry Walker (disambiguation) =

Sherry Walker may refer to:

- Sherry Walker (born 1960), American politician from Florida
- Sherry Dorsey Walker, American politician from Delaware

== See also ==
- Sherron Walker (born 1956), American athlete
