= Florida's 15th House of Representatives district =

American legislative district in Florida

The 15th district in comparison to Jacksonville, Florida

Florida's 15th House district elects one member of the Florida House of Representatives. This district is located in Northeast Florida and covers Nassau County and some of Duval County.

== Representatives from 1967 to the present ==
Representatives by party affiliation
Party	Representatives
Democratic	10
Republican	4

#	Name	Term of service	Residence	Political party
1	Leon McDonald	1967–1968		Democratic
2	Howell Lancaster	1968–1972		Democratic
3	Leon McDonald	1972–1972		Democratic
4	George Grosse	1972–1977		Democratic
5	George Crady	1977–1982		Democratic
6	Steve Pajcic	1982–1985		Democratic
7	Mike Langton	1986–1992		Democratic
8	Willye Dennis	1992–1999		Democratic
9	E. Denise Lee	2000–2002		Democratic
10	Audrey Gibson	November 5, 2002 – November 2, 2010		Democratic
11	Reggie Fullwood	November 2, 2010 – November 6, 2012		Democratic
12	Daniel Davis	November 6, 2012 – November 4, 2014		Republican
13	Jay Fant	November 4, 2014 – November 6, 2018		Republican
14	Wyman Duggan	November 6, 2018 – November 8, 2022		Republican
15	Dean Black	November 8, 2022 – present		Republican
