= George Kirkpatrick =

George Kirkpatrick may refer to:

- George Airey Kirkpatrick (1841–1899), Canadian Conservative Party politician
- George Kirkpatrick (Florida politician) (1938–2003), American politician from Florida
- George Ross Kirkpatrick (1867–1937), writer and 1916 Socialist Party vice-presidential candidate
- George Macaulay Kirkpatrick (1866–1950), British general
