= Senator Kirkpatrick =

Senator Kirkpatrick may refer to:

- George Kirkpatrick (Florida politician) (1938–2003), Florida State Senate
- Kay Kirkpatrick (born 1954), Georgia State Senate
- Snyder S. Kirkpatrick (1848–1909), Kansas State Senate
- Thomas J. Kirkpatrick (1829–1897), Virginia State Senate
