= Senator Hollingsworth =

Senator Hollingsworth may refer to:

- David Hollingsworth (1844–1929), Ohio State Senate
- Dennis Hollingsworth (born 1967), California State Senate
- Wayne Hollingsworth (1938–1990), Florida State Senate

== See also ==
- Beverly Hollingworth (born 1935), New Hampshire State Senate
