= E. Denise Lee =

American politician (1952–2023)

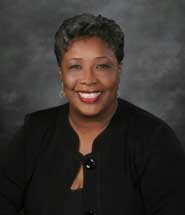

Member of the Jacksonville City Council from the 8th district
- In office July 1, 2007 – June 30, 2015
- Preceded by: Gwen Yates
- Succeeded by: Katrina Brown

Member of the Florida House of Representatives from the 15th district
- In office November 2, 1999 – November 5, 2002
- Preceded by: Willye Dennis
- Succeeded by: Audrey Gibson

Member of the Jacksonville City Council
- In office September 28, 1982 – June 30, 1999
- Preceded by: Sallye Mathis
- Succeeded by: Gwen Yates
- Constituency: 11th district (1982–1983); 8th district (1983–1999)

Personal details
- Born: June 30, 1952 Jacksonville, Florida
- Died: August 29, 2023 (aged 71) Jacksonville, Florida
- Party: Democratic
- Children: 1
- Education: Florida A&M University
- Occupation: Consultant

Evelyn Denise Lee (June 30, 1952 – August 29, 2023) was a Democratic politician from Florida who served as a member of the Florida House of Representatives from the 15th district from 1999 to 2002. She served as a member of the Jacksonville City Council from 1982 to 1999 and from 2007 to 2015.

== Early life ==
Lee was born in Jacksonville, Florida, in 1952, and attended Florida A&M University. While a student, she was involved in the Florida Democratic Party and worked on several state and local campaigns. She worked as an account clerk for the Florida Department of Legal Affairs and as a referral coordinator for the Private Industry Council of Jacksonville, a program that helped low-income residents find private-sector jobs.

== Jacksonville City Council ==
In 1982, City Councilwoman Sallye Mathis, who represented the 11th district on the Jacksonville City Council died, and Lee applied to serve out the remaining months of her term. The Rules Committee voted to recommend her nomination to the full council, but the process was delayed amid "infighting." Several members of the City Council sought to advance the nomination of another candidate, and requested that the nomination be sent back to the Rules Committee, but eventually relented in favor of Lee, who was sworn in on September 27, 1982.

Lee ran for a full term in 1983 from the 8th district, and was challenged in the Democratic primary by the Reverend R. B. Holmes, the president of the Jacksonville chapter of the NAACP. Lee placed first in the primary, but did not win a majority, and proceeded to a runoff with Holmes, which she won by a wide margin. In the general election, she faced only a write-in candidate, and won the election in a landslide.

In 1987, Lee ran for re-election, and was challenged by Charles Spencer, a local union leader. She won the Democratic primary in a landslide, receiving 70 percent of the vote, and was unopposed in the general election.

Lee ran for a third full term in 1991, and was challenged in the Democratic primary by teacher Henry Sellers. She won re-election overwhelmingly, receiving 77 percent of the vote in the primary, and again faced no opponent in the general election.

In 1995, Lee ran for re-election, and was challenged by Democrats Omega Allen and Catherine Barney-Newman, both of whom criticized her as an ineffective member of the council. Lee defeated both by a wide margin, receiving 70 percent of the vote.

Lee was unable to seek another term in 1999. In 1991, voters enacted term limits that came into effect in 1999.

== Florida House of Representatives ==
After leaving the City Council, Lee filed to run for the Florida House of Representatives from the 15th district, seeking to succeed term-limited State Representative Willye Dennis in 2000.

However, after Dennis pleaded guilty to federal fraud charges and she resigned, a special election was held for the final year of her term. Lee ran in the special election, and faced former mayoral aide Alton Yates, tree surgeon Iris Hinton, and consultant Nita Bell in the Democratic primary. She easily won the Democratic primary, receiving 64 percent of the vote, In the general election, she defeated Republican Lawrence Jefferson with 77 percent of the vote.

Lee ran for re-election to a full term in 2000, and was re-elected unopposed.

== 2002 State Senate campaign ==
In 2002, State Senator Betty Holzendorf was term-limited and unable to seek re-election. Former State Representative Tony Hill was the frontrunner to succeed her, but Lee ran against him, straining her political alliance with Holzendorf and Congresswoman Corinne Brown, both of whom endorsed Hill. Hill defeated Lee by a wide margin, receiving 61 percent of the vote to her 39 percent.

== Return to the City Council ==
In 2007, Lee announced that she would seek to return to the Jacksonville City Council, and ran to reclaim her seat in the 8th district. Incumbent City Councilwoman Gwen Yates, who succeeded Lee in 1999, was term-limited. Lee won the election in a landslide, defeating Sheriff's office employee Jerome Spates and constant Rebecca Balkcom Zeigler.

Lee was re-elected without opposition in 2011. She was term-limited in 2015.

After leaving office, Lee joined the administration of Lenny Curry, the newly elected Mayor, and oversaw the city's response to blight.

== Death ==
Lee died on August 29, 2023.
