= Chester Clem =

American politician (1937–2026)

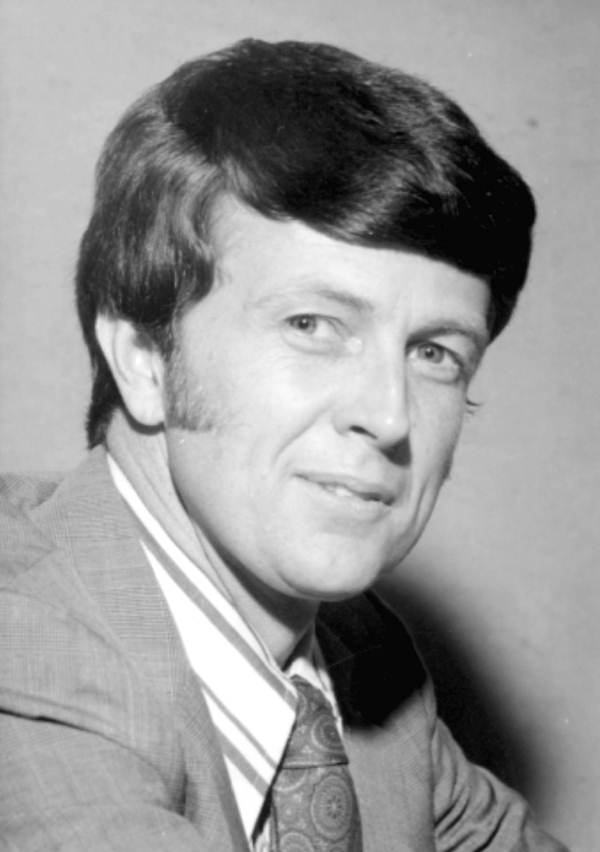
- Clem in 1972

Member of the Florida House of Representatives from the 48th district
- In office November 7, 1972 – November 2, 1976
- Preceded by: Roger H. Wilson
- Succeeded by: Dale Patchett

Personal details
- Born: December 28, 1937 Sanford, Florida, U.S.
- Died: February 18, 2026 (aged 88)
- Party: Republican
- Education: University of Florida (BSBA), University of Florida College of Law (LLB)
- Occupation: attorney

Chester Earl Clem Jr. (December 28, 1937 – February 18, 2026) was an American politician in the state of Florida.

== Life and career ==
Clem was born in Sanford, Florida on December 28, 1937. He attended the University of Florida and was admitted to the Florida bar in 1963. He served in the Florida House of Representatives for the 48th district from 1972 to 1976, as a Republican. He ran for Governor of Florida in 1986, but came in fourth place in the Republican primary. Clem died on February 18, 2026, at the age of 88.
