= Sherry Walker =

American politician (born 1960)

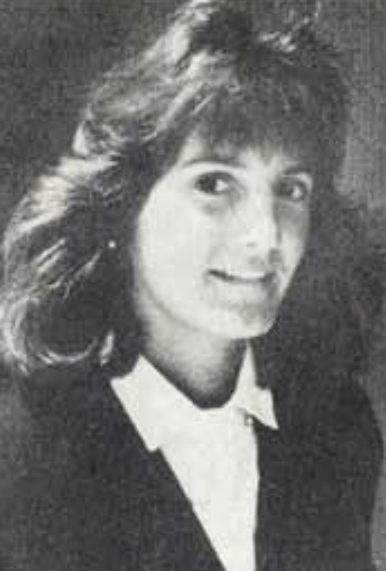

Member of the Florida Senate from the 5th district
- In office November 8, 1988 – November 3, 1992
- Preceded by: Wayne Hollingsworth
- Succeeded by: Charles Williams (redistricting)

Personal details
- Born: November 3, 1960 (age 66) Waukeenah, Florida
- Party: Democratic
- Education: University of Tennessee; Florida State University (B.A.); Cooley Law School (J.D.)
- Occupation: Attorney

Sherry Derenda Walker (born November 3, 1960) is a Democratic politician and attorney from Florida who served as a member of the Florida Senate from the 5th district from 1988 to 1992.

== Early life ==
Walker was born in Waukeenah, Florida, in 1960, and attended the University of Tennessee before graduating from Florida State University in 1982 with her bachelor's degree in political science. She graduated from the Cooley Law School in Lansing, Michigan, in 1986, with her juris doctor, and returned to Florida to practice law. Walker worked as a prosecutor in Leon County before joining the law firm of Caminez, Srygley, Brown and Walker.

== Florida Senate ==
In 1988, Walker ran for the Florida Senate from the 5th district, challenging incumbent State Senator Wayne Hollingsworth for re-election in the Democratic primary. She argued that Hollingsworth was ineffective and beholden to special interests, and pledged to reject contributions from political action committees in the campaign. Walker narrowly defeated Hollingsworth, winning 53 percent of the vote to his 47 percent. She faced no Republican opponent in the general election, and was elected unopposed.

Walker declined to run for a second term in 1992, citing her desire to focus on her legal career. As she left office, she proposed a series of reforms to the state's budgeting process, calling for the creation of a ways-and-means committee and expediting the approval of the state budget.
