= Don Fuqua =

American politician (born 1933)

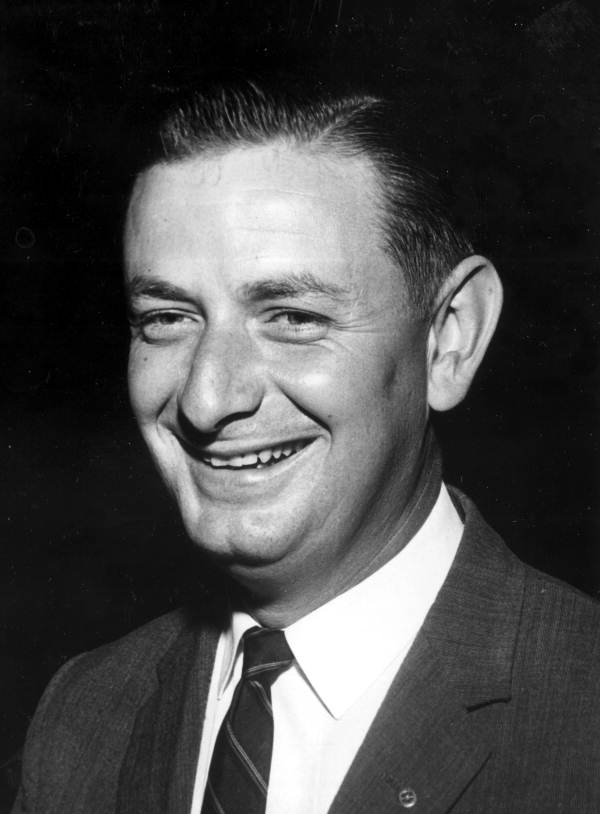

Chair of the House Science Committee
- In office January 3, 1979 – January 3, 1987
- Preceded by: Olin E. Teague
- Succeeded by: Robert A. Roe

Member of the U.S. House of Representatives from Florida
- In office January 3, 1963 – January 3, 1987
- Preceded by: Constituency established
- Succeeded by: Bill Grant
- Constituency: 9th district (1963–1967); 2nd district (1967–1987)

Personal details
- Born: John Donald Fuqua; August 20, 1933 (age 93) Jacksonville, Florida, U.S.
- Party: Democratic
- Education: University of Florida (BA)

John Donald "Don" Fuqua (born August 20, 1933) is an American politician from Florida who served as a member of the United States House of Representatives from 1963 to 1987. He is a member of the Democratic Party.

== Early years and education ==
Fuqua was born in Jacksonville, Duval County, Florida in 1933. His parents were John D. and Lucille Fuqua. He had two brothers. He attended the University of Florida at Gainesville from 1951 to 1953. After being in the military in the Korean War, he returned to the university to graduate in 1957. Fuqua served in the Florida House of Representatives from 1958 to 1962.

== Politics ==
Fuqua was elected as a Democrat to the United States House of Representatives from Florida and served from January 3, 1963, to January 3, 1987. Fuqua was chairman of the United States House Committee on Science, Space, and Technology.

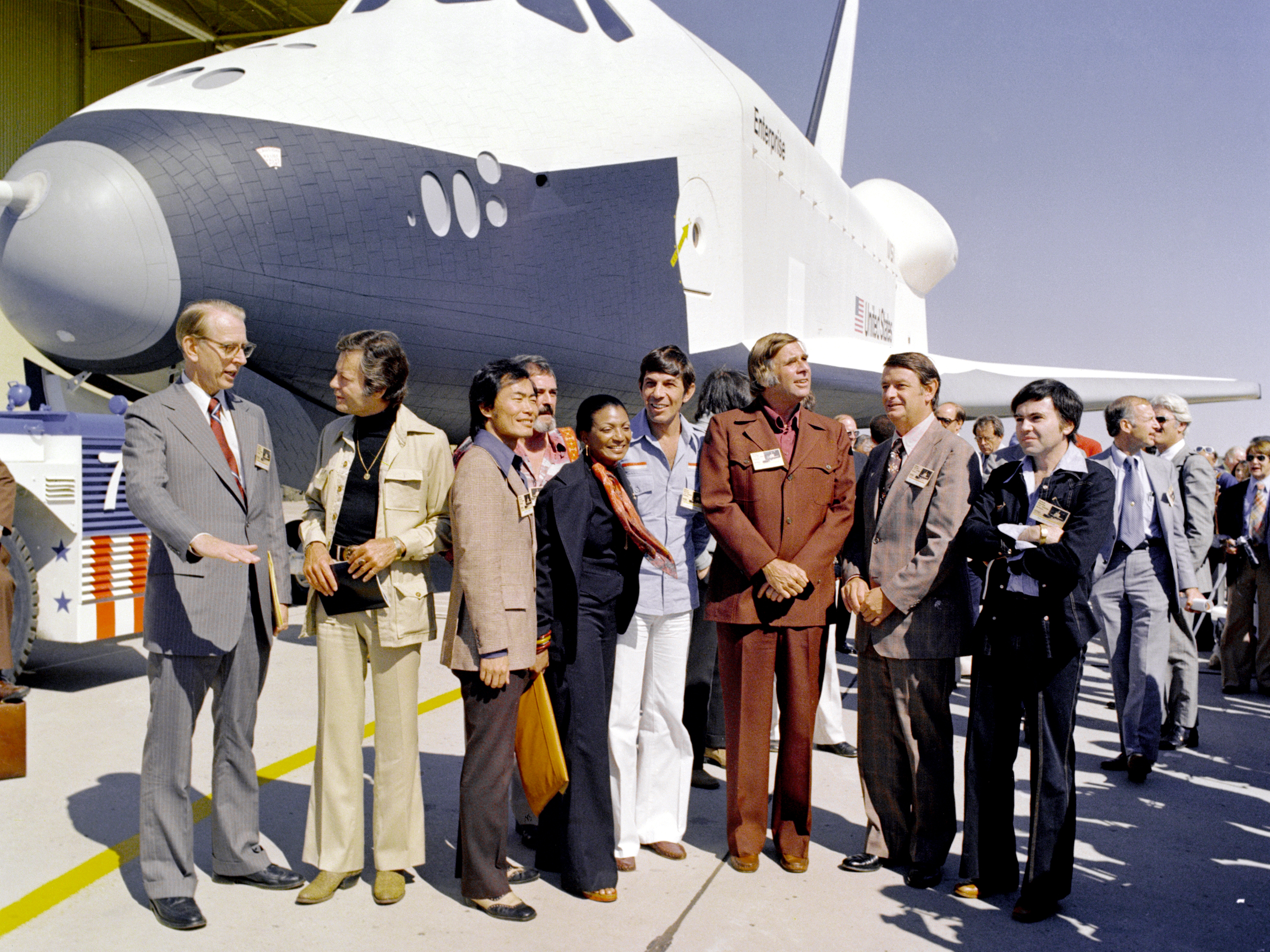
The Shuttle Enterprise rolls out of the Palmdale manufacturing facilities with Star Trek television cast members and Don Fuqua in attendance.

Fuqua is the last living person who voted against the landmark Civil Rights Act of 1964. He later said that he voted no because he was expecting to be challenged by a segregationist in the 1964 elections.

== Personal life and legacy ==
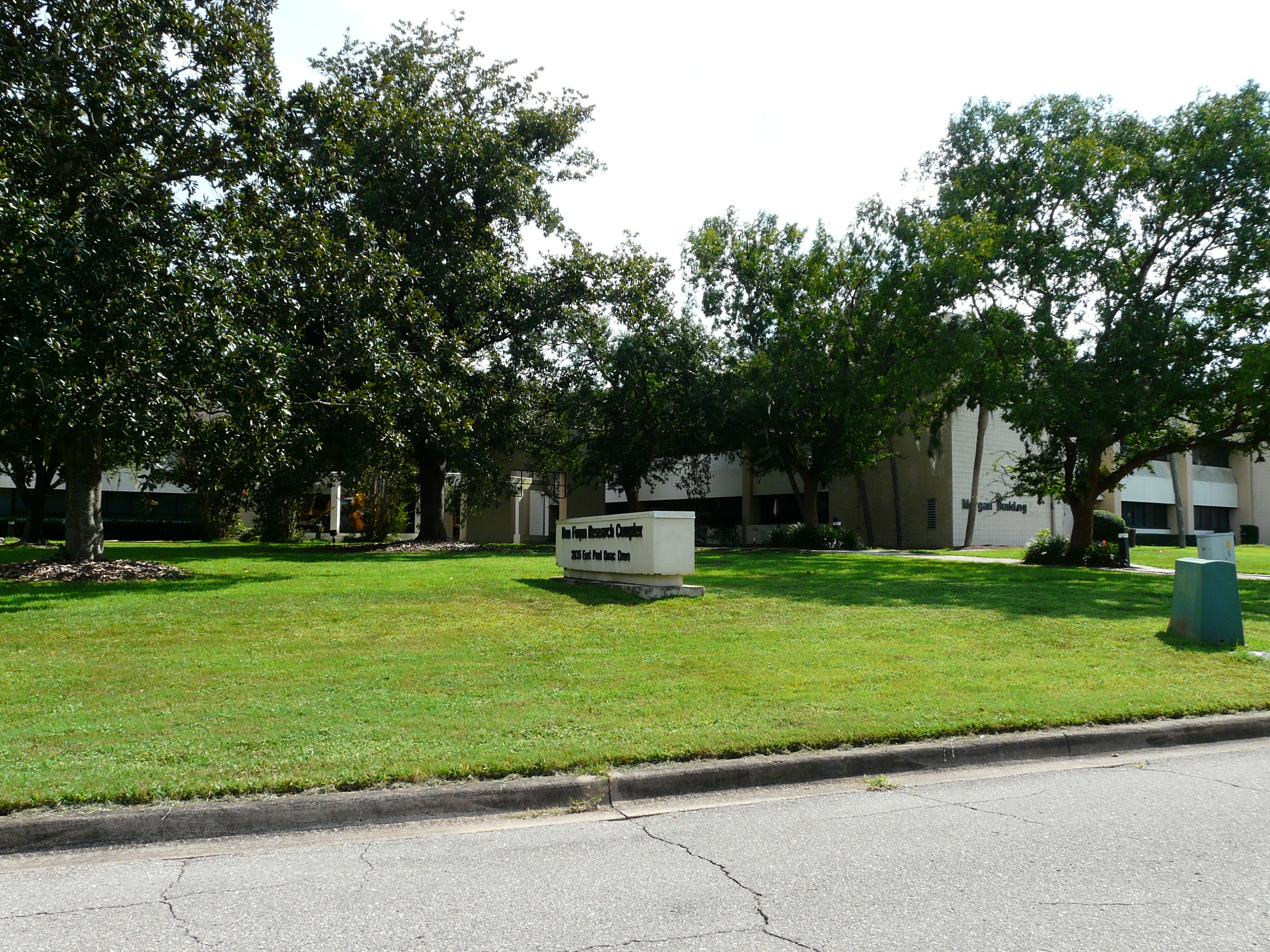
The Don Fuqua Research Complex in Tallahassee, Florida

Fuqua served in Korea with the United States Army Medical Corps during and after the Korean War. During most of his congressional career his legal residence was a farm near Altha in Calhoun County, Florida, where he became a dairy farmer. He lives in Gainesville, Florida.

After leaving Congress Fuqua became president of the Aerospace Industries Association.

U.S. House of Representatives
New constituency	Member of the U.S. House of Representatives from Florida's 9th congressional district 1963–1967	Succeeded by Paul G. Rogers
Preceded by Charles Bennett	Member of the U.S. House of Representatives from Florida's 2nd congressional district 1967–1987	Succeeded by Bill Grant
Preceded by Olin E. Teague	Chair of the House Science Committee; 1979–1987	Succeeded by Robert A. Roe
Honorary titles
Preceded by Merwin Coad	Most Senior Living U.S. Representative; Sitting or Former; 2025–present Served alongside: Alec G. Olson	Current holder
U.S. order of precedence (ceremonial)
Preceded by Dave Camp as Former U.S. Representative	Order of precedence of the United States as Former U.S. Representative	Succeeded by Michael Bilirakis as Former U.S. Representative
