= Wayne Hollingsworth =

American politician (1938–1990)

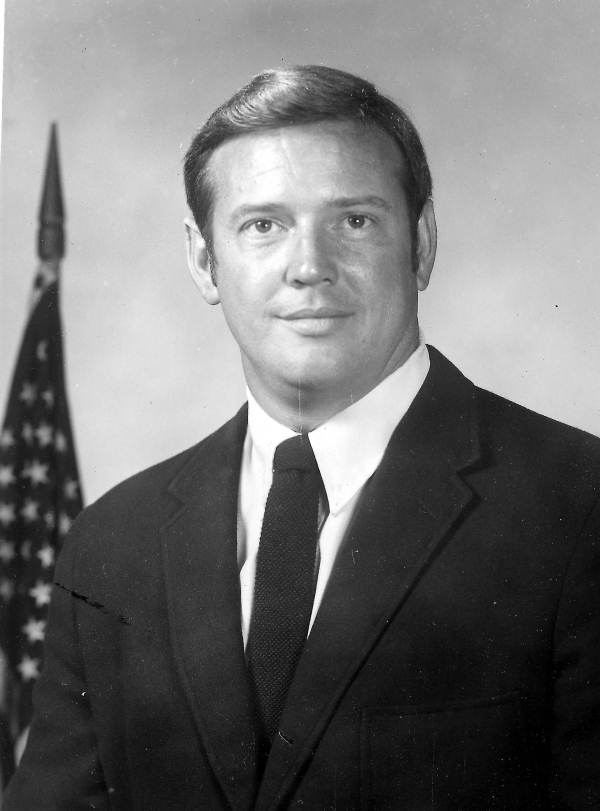

Member of the Florida Senate from the 3rd district
- In office November 4, 1986 – November 8, 1988
- Preceded by: Bill Grant
- Succeeded by: Sherry Walker

Member of the Florida House of Representatives
- In office November 2, 1976 – November 4, 1986
- Preceded by: Pete Skinner
- Succeeded by: Randy Mackey
- Constituency: 13th district (1976–1982); 12th district (1982–1986)

Member of the Florida House of Representatives from the 17th district
- In office November 3, 1970 – November 7, 1972
- Preceded by: Ralph Tyre
- Succeeded by: Leon McDonald (redistricting)

Personal details
- Born: February 14, 1938 Lake City, Florida, U.S.
- Died: December 12, 1990 (aged 52) near Lake City, Florida, U.S.
- Cause of death: Car accident
- Party: Democratic
- Children: 1
- Education: University of Miami; Arkansas State University (B.S.)
- Occupation: Farmer, mobile home park owner

Wayne Hollingsworth (February 14, 1938 – December 12, 1990) was an American politician from Florida. A member of the Democratic Party, he served as a member of the Florida House of Representatives from 1970 to 1972 and 1976 to 1986, and as a member of the Florida Senate from the 3rd district from 1986 to 1988.

Hollingsworth was first elected to the Florida House of Representatives from the 17th district in 1970, defeating incumbent State Representative Ralph Tyre in the Democratic primary. After redistricting, he ran for re-election in 1972 in the 13th district, but was defeated in the primary by former State Representative Leon McDonald. In 1976, when State Representative Pete Skinner ran for the Florida Senate, Hollingsworth ran to succeed him in the 13th district. He won the election and was re-elected in 1978 and 1980. In 1982, Hollingsworth successfully ran for re-election in the 13th district, and was re-elected in 1984.

In 1986, when State Senator Bill Grant ran for Congress, he resigned under the state's resign-to-run law, and Hollingsworth ran in the special election to fill the remaining two years of Grant's term. He ran for a full term in 1988 and was challenged in the Democratic primary by attorney Sherry Walker, who argued that he was ineffective. Walker defeated him by a narrow margin.

On December 12, 1990, Hollingsworth died in a single-car accident near Lake City, Florida.
