= Willye Dennis =

American politician (1926–2012)

Willye F. Clayton Dennis
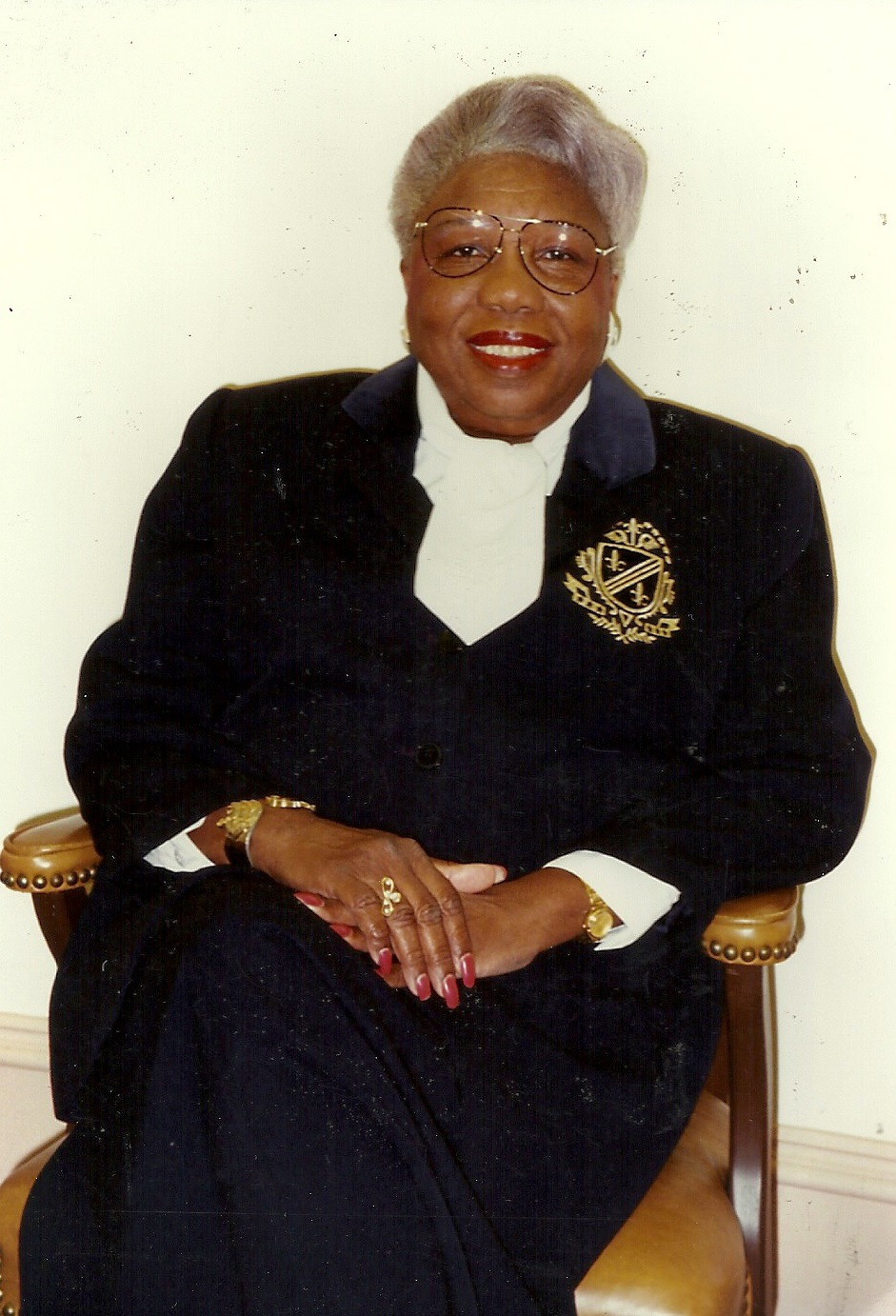
- Studio Portrait 2007

Member of the Florida House of Representatives from the 15th district
- In office November 3, 1992 – August 20, 1999
- Preceded by: Mike Langton
- Succeeded by: E. Denise Lee

Personal details
- Born: Willye Frank Clayton; March 14, 1926 Jacksonville, Florida, U.S.
- Died: March 9, 2012 (aged 85) Jacksonville, Florida, U.S.
- Party: Democratic
- Spouse: Leo Dennis (m. 1954; died 2010)
- Children: 3

Willye F. Clayton Dennis (March 14, 1926 – March 9, 2012) was an American librarian, civil rights activist and Florida state legislator. She was the first African-American Chief of Children's Services for the Jacksonville Public Library System. She was elected president of the Jacksonville branch of the National Association for the Advancement of Colored People, president of the Jacksonville Alumnae Chapter of Delta Sigma Theta and elected to the 15th District of the Florida House of Representatives for two terms.

== Early life ==
Dennis was born in Jacksonville, Florida, to Eli Clayton and Claudia. She was the youngest of five children. She graduated from Stanton High School in 1943, and received a B.A. from Clark College in 1953 with a major in psychology. She received her master's degree in library science in 1956. On February 7, 1954, she married Leo Dennis. They remained married until November 2, 2010, when he died at the age of 92. Three children were born of this marriage: Wilene, Leo and Byron.

== Career and activism ==
=== Librarian ===
Dennis was hired as an assistant librarian at the Wilder Park Branch Library, the only library where blacks were allowed during that time, earning 50 cents an hour. When she went to City Hall to apply for a librarian position, she was told that they didn't have any openings for niggers. She answered,"Good, I'm not one." She eventually took the Civil Service Test, and was hired by the City of Jacksonville as a librarian. In 1969, she was named Chief of Children Services for the Jacksonville Library System, the first black person to hold this position. She wrote a grant that was approved to Housing and Urban Development for an outreach program entitled "LOOP" which is an acronym for Library Operated Outreach Program. LOOP was recognized by the American Library Association as a model program. She retired in 1980.

=== Family Cooperative Learning and Development ===
In 1978, she founded Fam-Co Learning and Development Center, a non-profit child daycare center. In 1992, Child Magazine listed the child care center as one of the top ten in the country. In 1999, she pleaded guilty to appropriating government subsidies intended for the daycare, and was forced to resign from the state legislature.

=== Martin Luther King Breakfast ===
Martin Luther King Breakfast is an annual event in the city of Jacksonville, Florida, designed to bring the community together. William "Bill" Bond, then president of the Jacksonville Chamber of Commerce was approached by his wife who wanted to honor Martin Luther King. Mr. Bond asked Ms. Dennis, Jacksonville Branch NAACP president and chairman of the chamber's Minority Economic Development Committee and Ronnie Ferguson, president of the Jacksonville Urban League, to "come up with something". The breakfast, now in its 27th year, is held annually at the Prime Osborn Convention Center. The first speaker on January 15, 1988, was Benjamin Hooks, executive director of the NAACP. The second speaker was Rep. John Lewis.

=== NAACP ===
Dennis served as president of the Jacksonville NAACP Branch from 1984 to 1994. The local branch filed a suit against the Duval County School Board in 1985 alleging that the School Board had not completely desegregated the schools. After discovering thousands of vacant seats in schools located in predominantly African-American neighborhoods, the NAACP urged the community to vote no on a school bond issue to build new schools in the predominantly white community. Between December 14 and December 18, 1989, four bombs were mailed to persons involved in civil rights and desegregation cases. Two persons were killed when they opened packages mailed to them. On December 18, 1989, Ms. Dennis was one of four persons who received a pipe bomb addressed to the local branch of the NAACP. A series of incidents prevented Ms. Dennis from opening the package mailed to her at the local office of the NAACP. She told a reporter "for the rest of her life, she will believe it was a miracle, an act of divine intervention, that kept her from opening the package addressed to her.

The NAACP and the Duval County School Board reached an agreement after thirty years in court after many failed attempts. The agreement was televised to the Jacksonville community on Tuesday night, June 5, 1990. In 1990, Ms. Dennis' name, along with six other African American leaders appeared on a flyer that read: "WANTED DEAD OR ALIVE, $10,000 REWARD."

In a Florida Times Union article in 1991, Fourth Judicial Chief Circuit John Santora Jr. expressed his personal views regarding blacks, referred to a black woman judicial assistant as a "girl", his opposition to interracial marriage, how integration is the cause of crime and violence among black youth. Ms. Dennis as president of the Jacksonville Chapter of the NAACP, stated "it's a crying shame that a person holding the highest official position in the Duval County court makes such public remarks of a clearly racist nature, and then claims that his ability to judge others is untainted."

== Politics ==
On June 25, 1992, Dennis was elected as a Democrat to the Florida House of Representatives District 15 and subsequently reelected for a second term. During her first time in office, in 1993, Rep. Dennis became the first legislator to introduce two bills in the House of Representatives relating to the Rosewood, Florida, massacre that occurred in 1923. She served as the vice chair of the Education K-12 Committee, on the Financial Services Committee and the Health and Human Services Appropriations Committee.

In 1997, she was found guilty of using government appropriations to a day care center she ran, for her own personal use. She was forced to resign, sentenced to six months of home confinement, plus restitution and community service.

== Legacy ==
Tributes and honors awarded in Willye Dennis' include:

- The Willye Dennis Community Leader Award
- 2013 Recipient Honorable Alvin Brown, Mayor, Jacksonville, FL
- 2014 Recipients Honorable Mia Jones, State Representative and Anthony Hill, Former State Senator

Willye Dennis Nominated to the Florida Civil Rights Hall of Fame.

Florida House of Representatives
Preceded by Mike Langton	Member of the Florida House of Representatives from the 15th district 1992–2000	Succeeded by E. Denise Lee
