= Mattox Hair =

American politician

Mattox S. Hair
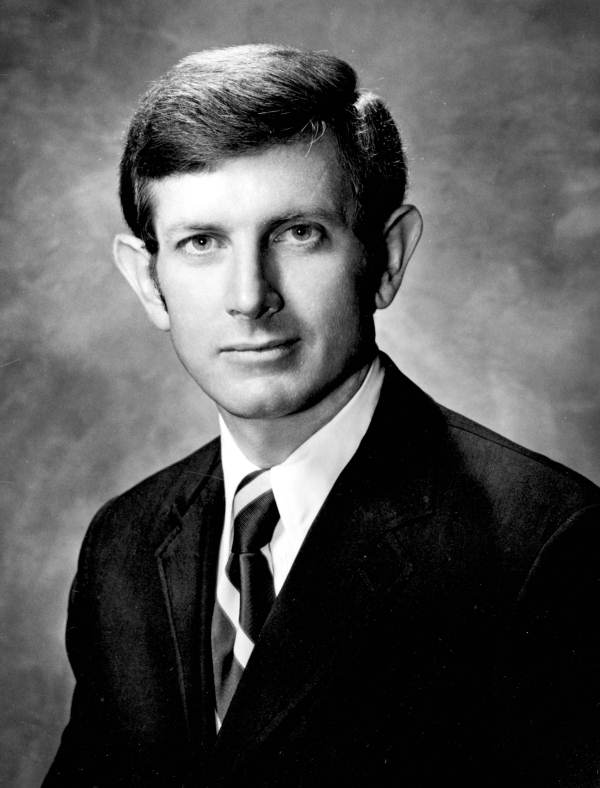

Member of the Florida Senate from the 9th district
- In office 1974–1988
- Preceded by: Bruce Smathers
- Succeeded by: Bill Bankhead

Member of the Florida House of Representatives from the 22nd district
- In office 1972–1974
- Preceded by: John E. Santora Jr.
- Succeeded by: Steve Pajcic

Personal details
- Born: January 19, 1938 (age 88) Coral Gables, Florida
- Party: Democratic
- Education: Florida State University (BS); University of Florida (JD)
- Occupation: attorney

Mattox S. Hair (born January 18, 1938) is an American politician in the state of Florida.

Hair was born in Coral Gables. He attended Florida State University, and the University of Florida Law School. He was admitted to the Florida bar in 1964. He was elected to the State Senate in 1974 and served the 9th district until 1988. He previously served in the Florida House of Representatives from 1972 to 1974.

Florida House of Representatives
Preceded by John E. Santora Jr.	Member of the Florida House of Representatives from the 22nd district 1972–1974	Succeeded by Steve Pajcic
Florida Senate
Preceded by Bruce Smathers	Member of the Florida Senate from the 9th district 1974–1988	Succeeded by W. G. Bankhead
