= Joe Arnall =

American politician

Joseph Arnall
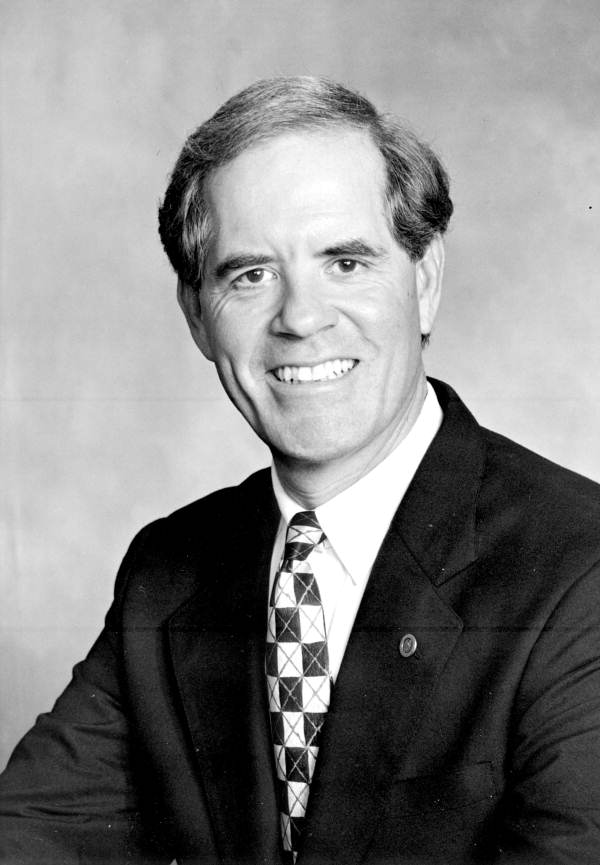

Member of the Florida House of Representatives
- In office November 8, 1988 – November 7, 2000
- Preceded by: Bill Bankhead
- Succeeded by: Don Davis
- Constituency: 19th district (1988–1992); 18th district (1992–2000)

Personal details
- Party: Republican

Joseph Arnall is an American politician. He served as a Republican member of the Florida House of Representatives from 1988-2000.
