= 1992 United States Senate election in Florida =

- November 3, 1992
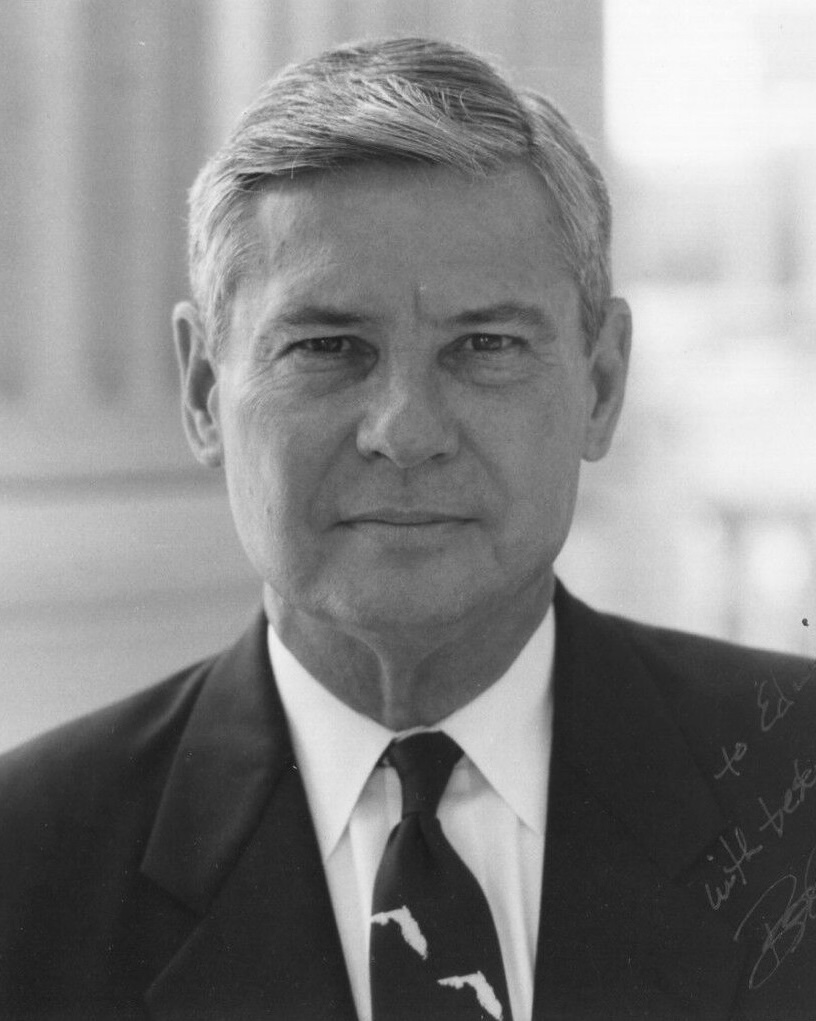

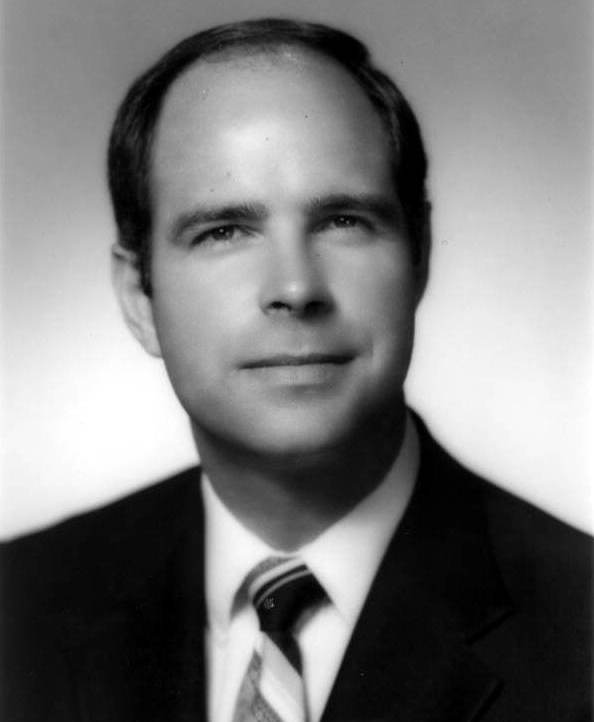
Nominee	Bob Graham	Bill Grant
Party	Democratic	Republican
Popular vote	3,245,585	1,716,511
Percentage	65.40%	34.59%
- Graham: 50–60% 60–70% 70–80% 80–90% >90% Grant: 50–60% 60–70% 70–80% 80–90% >90% Tie: 50% No votes
U.S. senator before election
Bob Graham
Democratic
Elected U.S. Senator
Bob Graham
Democratic

The 1992 United States Senate election in Florida took place on November 3, 1992 alongside other elections to the United States Senate in other states as well as elections to the United States House of Representatives and various state and local elections. Incumbent Democratic U.S. Senator Bob Graham won re-election to a second term by the second largest raw vote margin in any Florida statewide election ever, only behind Connie Mack III.

== Democratic primary ==
=== Candidates ===
- Bob Graham, incumbent United States Senator
- Jim Mahorner, attorney

=== Results ===
Democratic Primary results
Party	Candidate	Votes	%
Democratic	Bob Graham (incumbent)	968,618	84.3%
Democratic	Jim Mahorner	180,405	15.7%
Total votes		1,149,023	100.0%

== Republican primary ==
=== Candidates ===
- Hugh Brotherton
- Bill Grant, former U.S. Representative from Perry
- Rob Quartel, former member of the Federal Maritime Commission

=== Declined to run ===
- Norman Schwarzkopf, retired United States Army general and United States Central Command commander during the Gulf War

=== Results ===
Republican Primary results
Party	Candidate	Votes	%
Republican	Bill Grant	413,457	56.1%
Republican	Rob Quartel	196,524	26.7%
Republican	Hugh Brotherton	126,878	17.2%
Total votes		736,859	100.0%

== General election ==
=== Candidates ===
- Bob Graham (D), incumbent U.S. Senator
- Bill Grant (R), former U.S. Representative

=== Results ===
Graham defeated Grant in a landslide, as Grant won just one county in the state (Okaloosa County, Florida). There were no third party or independent candidates.

General election results
Party	Candidate	Votes	%	±%
Democratic	Bob Graham (incumbent)	3,245,565	65.40%	+10.66%
Republican	Bill Grant	1,716,505	34.59%	−10.67%
Write-ins	Marie Davis	220	0.01%	
Majority		1,529,060	30.81%	
Total votes		4,962,290	100.00%	
Democratic hold		Swing		

== See also ==
- 1992 United States Senate elections
