= Carl Ogden =

American insurance company executive and politician

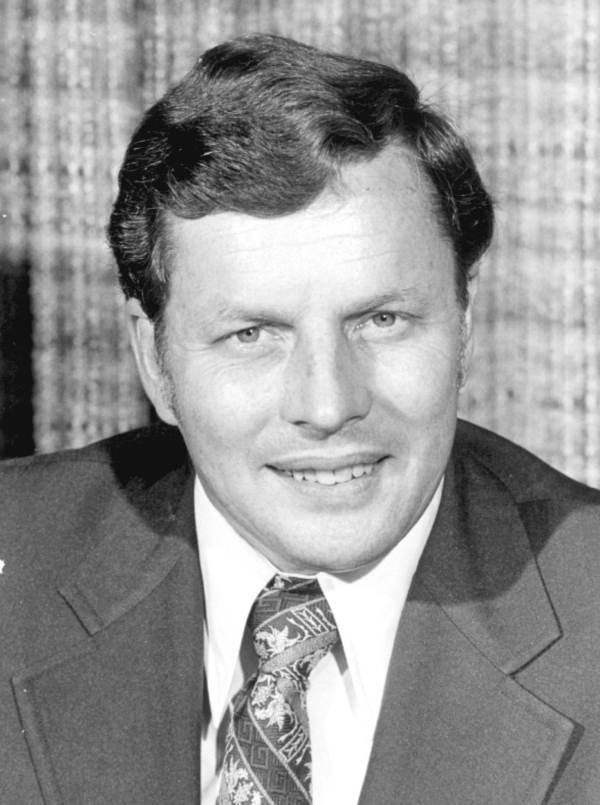

Member of the Florida House of Representatives from the 14th district
- In office 1983–1989
- Preceded by: Gene Hodges
- Succeeded by: Stephen Wise

Member of the Florida House of Representatives from the 20th district
- In office 1969–1983
- Preceded by: George B. Stallings
- Succeeded by: Thomas L. Hazouri

Carl Ogden (August 27, 1929 – November 5, 2013) was an American insurance company executive and politician from Florida. He served in the Air Force and lived on a farm in Monticello, Florida. A Democrat, he served in the Florida House of Representatives for 20 years. After he left the state house, Governor Bob Martinez appointed Ogden as director of the state’s employee insurance program.

Ogden was part of helicopter missions during the Korean War. After the helicopter he was in was shot down, he and a pilot escaped from a prisoner of war camp. He received a Silver Star and Purple Heart for his service.
