= Bill Bankhead =

American politician (1941–2005)

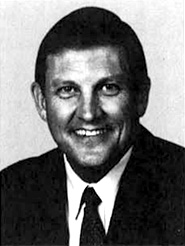

Member of the Florida Senate
- In office November 8, 1988 – January 13, 1999
- Preceded by: Mattox Hair
- Succeeded by: Jim King
- Constituency: 9th district (1988–1992); 8th district (1992–1999)

Member of the Florida House of Representatives
- In office November 7, 1978 – November 8, 1988
- Preceded by: Ander Crenshaw
- Succeeded by: Joe Arnall
- Constituency: 24th district (1978–1982); 19th district (1982–1988)

Personal details
- Born: January 15, 1941 Americus, Georgia
- Died: March 6, 2005 (aged 64) Ponte Vedra, Florida
- Party: Republican
- Spouse: Diana O'Quinn
- Children: 2
- Education: University of Florida (B.S.)
- Occupation: Real estate

William G. Bankhead (January 15, 1941 – March 6, 2005) was a Republican politician from Florida who served as a member of the Florida House of Representatives from 1978 to 1988 and as a member of the Florida Senate from 1988 to 1999. He served as the Secretary of the Florida Department of Juvenile Justice from 1999 to 2004.

== Early life ==
Bankhead was born in Americus, Georgia, in 1941 and moved to Florida in 1944, and grew up in Jacksonville. Bankhead graduated from Englewood High School in 1959, and later attended the University of Florida, graduating in 1963 with his bachelor's degree in business administration. He worked in real estate after graduation, first for Stockton, Whatley, Davin & Co., and then for CSX Transportation.

== Florida House of Representatives ==
In 1978, when State Representative Ander Crenshaw ran for Secretary of State, Bankhead ran to succeed him in the 24th district . He won the Republican nomination unopposed, and faced Democratic nominee Buck Cochran in the general election. Bankhead narrowly defeated Cochran, winning 53 percent of the vote to his 47 percent.

Bankhead ran for a second term in 1980, and was challenged by Democrat Andy Adams, a car dealer. Bankhead defeated Adams with 61 percent of the vote.

In 1982, following redistricting, Bankhead ran for re-election in the 19th district, and he was challenged by Democrat Eric Smith, a Jacksonville City Councilman and former State Representative, and Libertarian Gerald Nyren. Bankhead defeated them, winning 51 percent of the vote to Smith's 41 percent and Nyren's 8 percent. Bankhead was challenged in 1984 by pharmacy manager Owen "Scotty" Scott and Nyren. During the campaign, Scott dropped out of the race, but his name remained on the ballot, and Bankhead won re-election with 79 percent of the vote. He was re-elected unopposed in 1986.

== Florida Senate ==
In 1988, Democratic State Senator Mattox Hair declined to seek re-election, and Bankhead ran to succeed him in the 9th district, which stretched from eastern Jacksonville to Flagler County. He was challenged by Edwin Iacobucci, a high school teacher. Bankhead won in a landslide, receiving 77 percent of the vote to Iacobucci's 23 percent.

Following redistricting, Bankhead ran for re-election in the 8th district in 1992, and was re-elected unopposed. He was challenged by Democrat Bobbi de Cordova-Hanks, a public relations specialist at Florida Community College. He received 74 percent of the vote to de Cordova-Hanks's 26 percent. He was re-elected without opposition in 1998.

== Florida Department of Juvenile Justice ==
In 1999, Governor Jeb Bush appointed Bankhead to serve as the secretary of the Florida Department of Juvenile Justice, and he resigned from the senate. Following a cancer diagnosis, he went on medical leave on February 21, 2004, amid ongoing scrutiny into the death of a seventeen-year-old who was in state custody. Bankhead left the department several months later.

== Death ==
Bankhead died on March 6, 2005.
