= George Grosse =

American politician

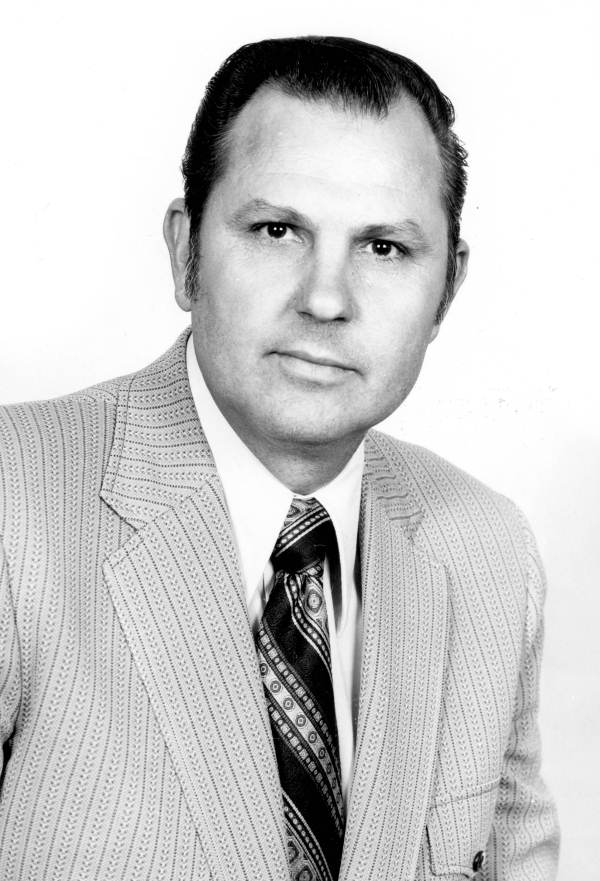
- Grosse in 1972

Member of the Florida House of Representatives from the 15th district
- In office 1972–1977
- Preceded by: Leon McDonald
- Succeeded by: George Crady

Personal details
- Born: March 15, 1930 Jacksonville, Florida, U.S.
- Died: June 3, 2016 (aged 86)
- Party: Democratic

George R. Grosse (March 15, 1930 – June 3, 2016) was an American politician. He served as a Democratic member for the 15th district of the Florida House of Representatives.

== Life and career ==
Grosse was born in Marietta, Florida. He attended Baldwin High School.

In 1972, Grosse was elected to represent the 15th district of the Florida House of Representatives, succeeding Leon McDonald. He served until 1977, when he was succeeded by George Crady.

Grosse died on June 3, 2016, at the age of 86.
