= Jim Horne (Florida politician) =

American politician

Florida Commissioner of Education
- In office 2003–2004
- Preceded by: Charlie Crist
- Succeeded by: John L. Winn

Member of the Florida Senate from the 6th district
- In office 1995–2001
- Preceded by: Ander Crenshaw
- Succeeded by: Stephen Wise

Personal details
- Born: January 20, 1959 (age 67) U.S.
- Party: Republican
- Occupation: Accountant, business executive, politician

Jim Horne (born January 20, 1959) is a former Republican Florida State Senator and Florida Commissioner of Education. He is an accountant and has worked in the real estate and consulting businesses. He resigned as Commissioner of Education in 2004.

Horne served in the Florida Legislature from 1995 to 2001 and was chairman of the Senate committee that handles the state budget. He represented Orange Park, Florida. The Florida Crossroads public television program spent a day with him while he served as Florida's education commissioner. He founded the Horne Group, a government consulting and business development company.

Florida Senate
| Preceded by Ander Crenshaw | Member of the Florida Senate from the 6th district 1995–2001 | Succeeded by Stephen Wise |
Political offices
| Preceded by Charlie Crist | Education Commissioner of Florida; 2003–2004 | Succeeded by John L. Winn |
