= George Crady =

American politician

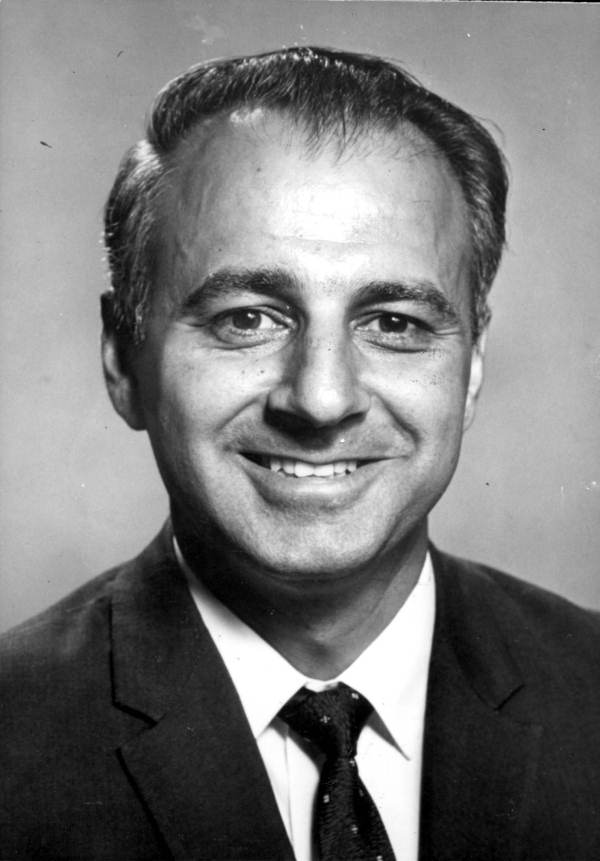

Member of the Florida House of Representatives from the 15th district
- In office 1977 – November 2, 1982
- Preceded by: George Grosse
- Succeeded by: Steve Pajcic

Member of the Florida House of Representatives from the 13th district
- In office November 2, 1982 – November 3, 1992
- Preceded by: Wayne Hollingsworth
- Succeeded by: Stephen Wise

Member of the Florida House of Representatives from the 12th district
- In office November 3, 1992 – November 7, 2000
- Preceded by: Randy Mackey
- Succeeded by: Aaron Bean

Personal details
- Born: June 14, 1931 (age 95) Miami, Florida
- Party: Democratic
- Spouse: Virginia Lee Roerig
- Education: Duke University
- Occupation: businessman

George Abraham Crady (born June 14, 1931) is an American politician in the state of Florida.

He was born in 1931 in Miami, and attended Duke University (B.A. 1953) and Jones Business College. After university, he was a helicopter pilot in the United States Marine Corps from 1954 to 1957.

He served in the Florida House of Representatives, as a Democrat, representing Nassau County, Baker County, Union County, and parts of Duval and Clay counties (15th District) from 1977 to November 2, 1982, 13th district from November 2, 1982, to November 3, 1992, and the 12th district from November 3, 1992, to November 7, 2000. He is a Democrat. Crady also has served as a member of Nassau County School Advisory Board from 1974 to 1976, also serving in the capacity of president from 1975 to 1976.

A Methodist, Crady is married to Virginia Lee Roerig of Jacksonville and has six daughters. He is a businessman.

See also GeorgeCrady.com for more information.

== Legislative positions held ==
- House Parliamentarian 1988–1994
- Rules Reform Chairman, Rules & Calendar Committee Vice Chairman 1988–1992
- Chairman of the Duval County Legislative Delegation 1989–1990
- Ethics & Elections Committee Chairman 1986–1988
- Rules, Resolutions, & Ethics Committee Co-Chair 1997–1998

== Awards received ==
- Yulee PTA Citizen of the Year, 1971
- League of Cities Quality Floridian Award 1990
- AARP Outstanding Service to the Community Award 1994
- Small County Coalition Outstanding Legislative Service Award 1994
- Florida Chamber of Commerce Roll Call Award 1994
