= Gary Pajcic =

American lawyer (1947–2006)

- Born: Gary Curtis Pajcic; October 2, 1947; Jacksonville, Florida, U.S.
- Died: August 2, 2006 (aged 58); Jacksonville, Florida, U.S.
- Education: Florida State University (BA, JD)
- Occupation: Attorney
- Spouse: Sallyn
- Children: 5
- Relatives: Steve Pajcic (brother)

Gary Pajcic (/ˈpædʒɪk/; October 2, 1947 – August 2, 2006), was a high school and college athlete, lawyer, and philanthropist in his hometown of Jacksonville, Florida. He earned his Juris Doctor in 1972 from the Florida State University College of Law.

== Upbringing and education ==
Pajcic was born and raised in Jacksonville. He attended Annie R. Morgan Elementary School, Paxon Middle School, and Paxon High School.

At Paxon High, he played football, basketball and baseball. He was the first player to be named Most Outstanding Football and Basketball player in Duval County. Pajcic was honored as Scholar-Athlete for the State of Florida.

== College ==
Pajcic played a big role in the success of teammate Ron Sellers, his friend from early childhood, who eventually was a 1968 first team All-American, sixth pick overall in the first round of the 1969 NFL draft and played five years of professional football. Pajcic was a sought-after recruit, but had made a pact with Sellers that the two would go to college together as a quarterback/receiver combination. University of Florida wanted Pajcic, but not Sellers, so the pair instead went to Florida State University.

A freshman star in 1965, Pajcic became FSU's starting quarterback in 1966. That was the season he threw the pass that resulted in "The Catch", the most controversial play in Florida State football history. In the home game against rival University of Florida, FSU trailed by 3 with less than a minute left in the fourth quarter. Lane Fenner, who was fresh because he had not yet played in the game, replaced Sellers, who had taken a blow in the last play. At the snap, he blew past the Gator defensive backs and Pajcic threw a perfect 45-yard pass to Fenner in the end zone, who caught it over-the-shoulder.

The crowd erupted, but a few seconds later, the linesman, who trailed the play from the line of scrimmage, arrived at the goal line and signaled the catch out of bounds. Pictures in newspapers the following day seem to support the claim that he was in bounds and many Seminoles regard this event as the start of their bitter rivalry with the Gators.

With eight touchdowns and an impressive throwing record, Pajcic was named honorable mention All-America honors in '66, though an arm injury in 1966 hampered the rest of his college career. Pajcic earned his Bachelor of Arts degree in 1969, majoring in history. He went on to attend the Florida State University College of Law, graduating with a Juris Doctor in 1972.

== Law ==
Pajcic passed the Florida Bar and Harry Shorstein hired him as an Assistant State Attorney in Jacksonville in 1972. Within 18 months, he was promoted to Division chief, then accepted the position of Assistant General Counsel for the City of Jacksonville in 1974. Also that year, Gary and brother Steve Pajcic decided to go into private practice together, forming Pajcic & Pajcic.

== Politics ==
Gary Pajcic managed brother Steve Pajcic's unsuccessful campaign for Florida governor in 1986 and assisted in the campaigns of Governor Lawton Chiles and President Bill Clinton. In 1995, Gary Pajcic and his brother Steve managed Nat Glover's campaign to become Jacksonville's first African-American sheriff. Most political "experts" gave Glover little chance of success, but against the odds, the Pajcic brothers campaign strategy gave Sheriff Nat Glover a victory.

== Philanthropy in education ==
Besides working as an attorney, Pajcic remained an active proponent of education as a private citizen. In 1992, Pajcic and his brother, Steve, established a million dollar endowment at the University of North Florida to pay the full tuition of any graduate of their alma mater, Paxon High School, who was accepted and enrolled at UNF.

Other significant donations include $1 million to bring better teachers to Jacksonville elementary schools and a 2002 gift of $1 million to Seminole Boosters, which Pajcic also served as a member of the national board of directors. That same year, Pajcic and his brother donated another $1 million to boost education at five inner-city elementary schools in Jacksonville including Annie R. Morgan elementary school, which both brothers had attended.

Two other high-profile donations included $100,000 to the Warrick Dunn Foundation to help single mothers buy their first homes and $100,000 to former Florida quarterback Danny Wuerffel's Desire Street Ministries to help victims of Hurricane Katrina.

== Death ==
Pajcic fell ill on a Friday night, experiencing chills that had developed by Saturday into a fever. He was hospitalized on Sunday in a Jacksonville hospital after having a seizure and fell into a coma. On Wednesday, August 2, 2006, he was taken off life support and died. He was 58 years old. Tests confirmed that he had contracted viral encephalitis.
