= Steve Pajcic =

American politician from Florida

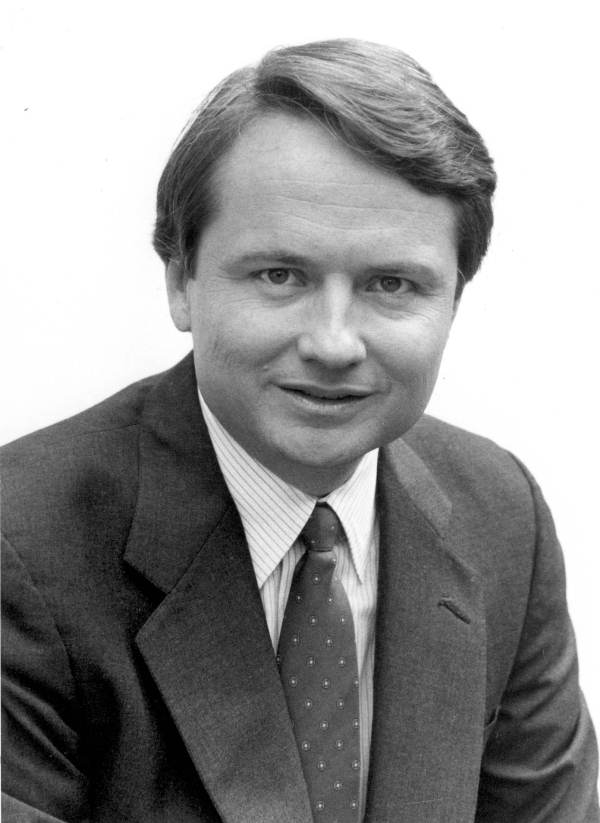

Member of the Florida House of Representatives
- In office November 5, 1974 – June 7, 1985
- Preceded by: Mattox Hair
- Succeeded by: Mike Langton
- Constituency: 22nd district (1974–1982); 15th district (1982–1985)

Personal details
- Born: August 4, 1946 (age 80) Jacksonville, Florida, U.S.
- Party: Democratic
- Spouse: Anne Kelley Pajcic
- Relations: Gary Pajcic (brother)
- Education: Princeton University (BA); Harvard University (JD)
- Occupation: Attorney

Steve Pajcic (/ˈpædʒɪk/; born August 4, 1946) is an American lawyer, politician and philanthropist. He served in the Florida House of Representatives for six terms, from 1974 to 1985. He was the Democratic nominee for governor of Florida in 1986.

== Upbringing and education ==
Pajcic was born and raised in Jacksonville, is of Croatian descent, and a 6th generation Florida Cracker on his mother's side. He attended Annie R. Morgan Elementary School, Paxon Middle School, and Paxon High School.

At Paxon High, he was valedictorian and student body class president. He was a star athlete and voted Most Valuable Player in the Florida high school all-star basketball game. He attended Princeton, where he played on the nationally ranked basketball teams following future NBA player and Democratic presidential candidate, Bill Bradley.

After graduating Phi Beta Kappa and magna cum laude from Princeton, Pajcic attended Harvard Law School, graduating with honors. His award-winning senior thesis at Princeton on the Economic Desirability of a Corporate Income Tax for Florida became the central issue in Reubin Askew's campaign for Governor.

== Political career ==
In 1974, Pajcic was elected to the first of six terms to the Florida House of Representatives, where he showed particular interest in educational issues. He was chairman of the Finance and Taxation Committee and the prime sponsor of major legislation, including an increase in the homestead exemption from $5,000 to $25,000, The Save Our Rivers land acquisition program, and migrant farm workers rights.

In eight of his 11 years, he was nominated by the St. Petersburg Times for the Most Valuable Member of the state house.

=== 1986 gubernatorial campaign ===
In 1986 he ran for the Democratic nomination for governor of Florida. He resigned on June 7, 1985, to focus on his campaign. In the primary election Pajcic slightly led the second-place finisher, state Attorney General Jim Smith; but, as neither had received 50%, per Florida law, a runoff primary was held. In a televised debate, the candidates were asked if, should they fail to win the nomination, would they endorse their runoff opponent in the general election against the Republican nominee. Smith and Pajcic answered in the affirmative.

When Pajcic emerged victorious, Smith evaded the issue of an endorsement for several days. Eventually, Smith came out and openly endorsed the Republican candidate, Tampa mayor Bob Martinez. This split in Democratic ranks was a major contributor to the election of Martinez as only the second Republican governor of Florida since Reconstruction, as even Martinez himself acknowledged in later years.

=== Later work in politics ===
Pajcic ended his electoral career after the 1986 election and reentered the practice of law in Jacksonville with his brother Gary Pajcic. In 1995, the Pajcic brothers managed Nathaniel (Nat) Glover's ultimately successful campaign to become Duval County's first African-American sheriff. Their law firm was also a major financial contributor to Bill Bradley's 2000 campaign for the Democratic presidential nomination.

In March 2007, Pajcic hosted one of the first fundraisers for future President Barack Obama. On January 7, 2017, President Obama returned to Pajcic's home as a groomsman in the wedding of Pajcic's daughter Helen to Obama's Travel Director and confidant Marvin Nicholson. Secretary of State John Kerry conducted the ceremony.

The Pajcic brothers' personal-injury law firm, Pajcic & Pajcic, donated $7500 to the successful 2006 gubernatorial campaign of then-Republican Florida Attorney General Charlie Crist (who became a Democrat four years later).

In the 2024 United States elections, Pajcic donated $147,000 to a Democratic Senate Super PAC.

During the 2026 United States elections, Pajcic emerged as a major Democratic donor in the final weeks, spending over $7 million in ads via his Super PAC New Deal for All in the Senate elections in Florida, South Carolina, Kansas, and Mississippi.

== Continued work in education ==
Besides working as an attorney, Pajcic has remained an active proponent of education as a private citizen. In 1992, Pajcic and his brother Gary established a million dollar endowment at the University of North Florida to pay the full tuition of any graduate of their alma mater, Paxon High School, who was accepted at and enrolled at UNF. Pajcic has also set up an endowment to pay the tuition of Paxon students who enroll at his college alma mater, Princeton University.

In 2002, the Pajcic brothers donated another $1 million to boost education at five inner-city elementary schools in Jacksonville.

On February 10, 2014, Steve and his wife, Anne, donated $2 million to Edward Waters College in Jacksonville. It is the largest amount the historically black college has ever received in a single donation. Pajcic said it is a blessing to be able to help others. Former Sheriff Nat Glover graduated from EWC and is now the President of the school.

Florida House of Representatives
Preceded by Mattox Hair	Member of the Florida House of Representatives from the 22nd district 1974–1982	Succeeded by Hamilton Upchurch
Preceded by George Crady	Member of the Florida House of Representatives from the 15th district 1982–1985	Succeeded by Mike Langton
Party political offices
Preceded by Bob Graham	Democratic nominee for Governor of Florida; 1986	Succeeded by Lawton Chiles
