= Sam Greco (politician) =

American politician from Florida

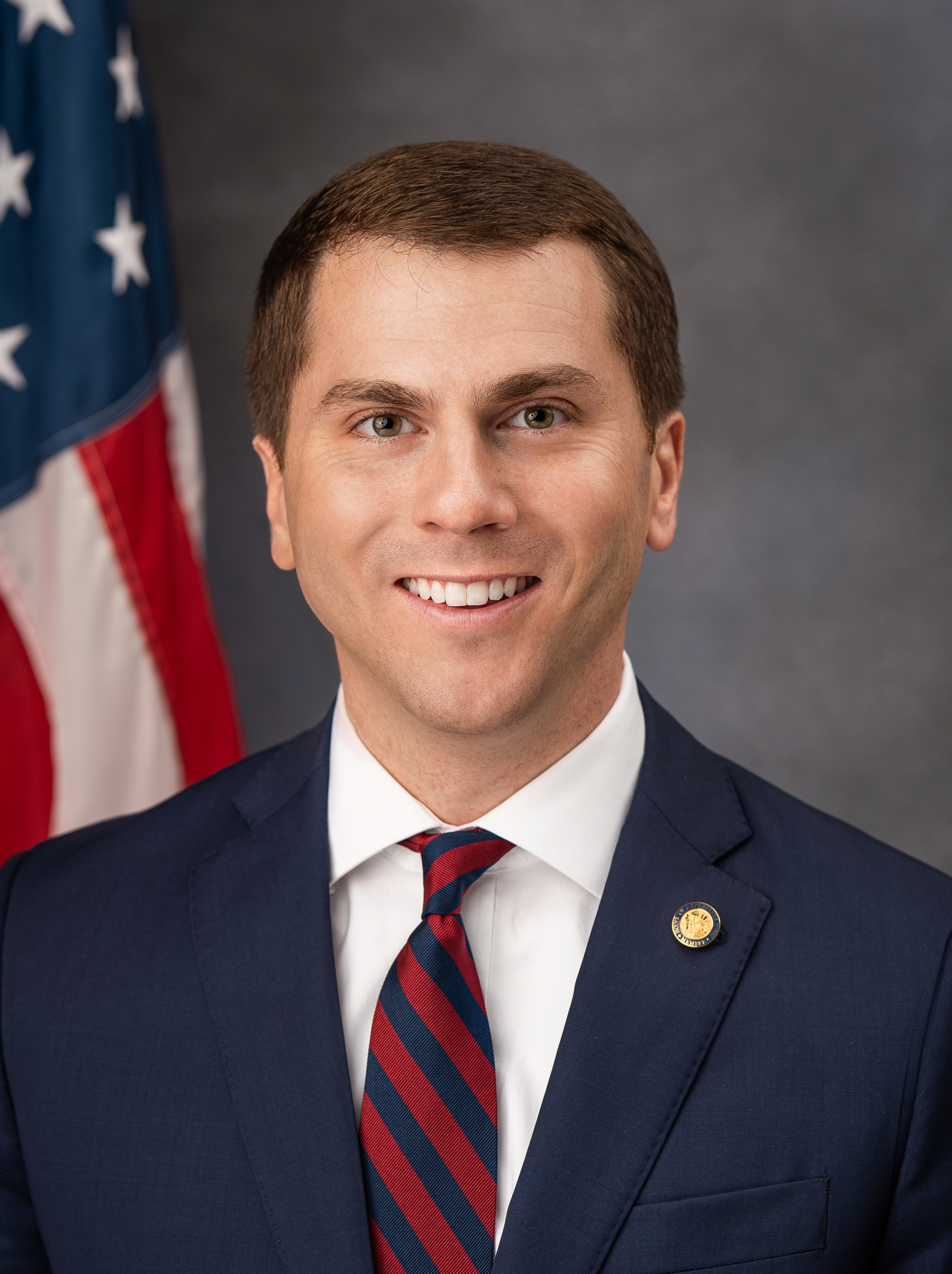
- Official portrait, c. 2024

Member of the Florida House of Representatives from the 19th district
- Incumbent
- Assumed office November 5, 2024
- Preceded by: Paul Renner

Personal details
- Born: Samuel Anthony Greco; August 14, 1992 (age 34)
- Party: Republican
- Spouse: Elanda Greco (m. 2023)
- Parent: James J. Greco (father)
- Education: Georgetown University (BS, JD)

Military service
- Branch/service: United States Navy
- Years of service: 2018–2019 (reserve); 2019–2024 (active); 2024–present (reserve)
- Rank: Lieutenant
- Unit: Judge Advocate General's Corps

Samuel Anthony Greco (born August 14, 1992) is an American politician, attorney, and naval officer who currently serves as a Republican member of the Florida House of Representatives representing the 19th district, which comprises all of Flagler County and the southeastern portion of St. Johns County, including both the cities of St. Augustine and Palm Coast.

== Early life, education, and military service ==
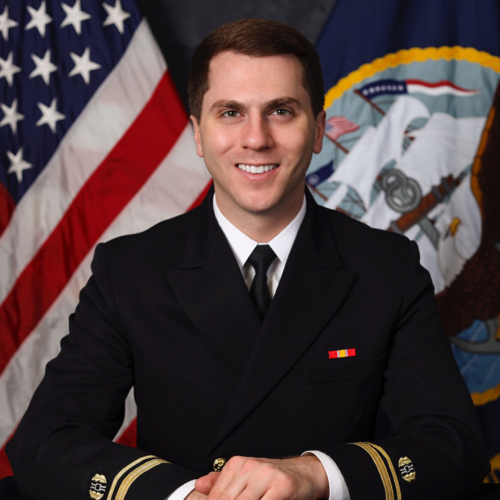
Sam Greco naval portrait, c. 2020

Greco attended Hopkins School in New Haven, Connecticut, where he served as student council president before graduating in 2011. He graduated from Georgetown University in 2015, and later received his JD from Georgetown in 2019.

In 2018, Greco joined the United States Navy Judge Advocate General's Corps and served on active duty from 2019 to 2024. He is currently a lieutenant in the United States Navy Reserve.

== Florida House of Representatives ==
After defeating Darryl Boyer in a landslide in the August primary, Greco was elected to the Florida House of Representatives in November 2024. During his campaign, he was endorsed by Governor Ron DeSantis, Senator Marco Rubio, Congressman Michael Waltz, and Speaker of the Florida House of Representatives Paul Renner. He was officially sworn into office on November 19, 2024.

== Personal life ==
Greco is Catholic. He married his wife, Elanda, in 2023. They live in St. Augustine, Florida. Greco is the son of Tijuana Flats CEO James J. Greco.

Florida House of Representatives
Preceded by Paul Renner	Member of the Florida House of Representatives from the 19th district 2024–present	Incumbent
