= Rod Smith (politician) =

American politician

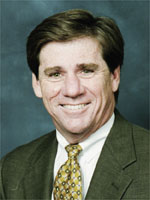

Chair of the Florida Democratic Party
- In office January 8, 2011 – January 26, 2013
- Preceded by: Karen Thurman
- Succeeded by: Allison Tant

Member of the Florida Senate
- In office November 7, 2000 – November 7, 2006
- Preceded by: George Kirkpatrick
- Succeeded by: Steve Oelrich
- Constituency: 6th district (2000–2002); 14th district (2002–2006)

State Attorney for the Eighth Judicial Circuit Court of Florida
- In office 1992–2000
- Preceded by: Len Register
- Succeeded by: Bill Cervone

Personal details
- Born: November 15, 1949 (age 76) Southwest City, Missouri, U.S.
- Party: Democratic
- Spouse: Dee Dee Smith
- Education: University of Tulsa (BA); University of Florida (JD)

Rodney Warren Smith (born November 15, 1949) is an American lawyer and politician from the U.S. state of Florida. A Democrat, Smith was a member of the Florida Senate from Gainesville from 2001 until 2006. Smith ran for the Democratic nomination for Governor of Florida in the 2006 election but lost to Congressman Jim Davis. In 2010, Smith was the Democratic nominee for Lieutenant Governor of Florida as the running mate of Alex Sink in her campaign for Governor of Florida. From November 2010 through January 2013 Smith served as chairman of the Florida Democratic Party. In 2016, Smith again ran for a seat in the Florida Senate but was ultimately defeated by Keith Perry, a Republican and former state representative.

== Early life and education ==
Smith was born on November 15, 1949, in Southwest City, Missouri, just across the state line from his family's home in Oklahoma. Before he reached the age of two, Smith's family moved to Florida, where they grew eggplant and green peppers. Smith attended public schools. He attended the University of Tulsa, graduating with a Bachelor of Arts degree in 1971. While at the University of Tulsa, he was a member of the Sigma Nu fraternity. He then attended the University of Florida College of Law graduating with a J.D. degree in 1975.

== Legal and political career ==
Following his admission to The Florida Bar, Smith worked for the Florida Public Employees Relations Commission for two years, representing the state in cases relating to labor law. After two years in Tallahassee, Smith returned to Alachua County and spent the next 15 years in private practice. The St. Petersburg Times later wrote that, since that time, Smith has "crisscrossed Florida, representing an array of labor unions–police officers and firefighters, electrical workers, carpenters, painters and pipe fitters. He argued on behalf of large vegetable farmers and dairies and nurserymen. He won settlements against the likes of DuPont and, occasionally, represented criminal defendants...He established himself as a skillful litigator."

In 1992, Smith was recruited by a group of county sheriffs to seek the office of State Attorney for the Eighth Judicial Circuit of Florida. Smith defeated incumbent Len Register that same year and, during his first term, successfully prosecuted serial killer Danny Rolling, the "Gainesville Ripper." Re-elected in 1996, Smith created the circuit's first special prosecutions unit, which dealt with crimes against women and children, and created an environmental crime unit. He was succeeded by Bill Cervone to be State Attorney.

=== State Senate ===
In 2000, Smith was elected to the Florida Senate as a Democrat. He represented the 14th Senate district, which included nine counties in northern Florida, centered around Gainesville and Ocala. While in the Senate, Smith served as chair of the Agriculture Committee, as vice chair of the Criminal Justice and Justice Appropriations Committees, and as a member of the Communications and Public Utilities, Environmental Preservation, Rules and Calendar, and Ways and Means Committees, as well as the Legislative Budget Commission.

During his term in the Florida Senate, Smith was noted for his work on issues related to criminal justice. He strengthened the state's child abuse laws, fought discrimination in housing and worked to protect the privacy of crime victims. He also improved the state's crime prevention and homeland security initiatives. Smith "sponsored, and passed, legislation to prevent mentally retarded persons from being executed." In 2006, he led the coalition that defeated Governor Jeb Bush's plan to weaken Florida's voter-approved class size amendment and create a school voucher program.

=== Legal career ===
Smith is a partner with the law firm of Avera & Smith and also serves as an adjunct professor at the University of Florida's Levin College of Law where he teaches constitutional law and trial practice and supervises the prosecution clinic. He has also taught at Santa Fe Community College.

The Miami Herald summed up Smith's biography in this way, "He comes from a line of struggling farmers and saw public school as a way out. While in law school at the University of Florida, he juggled going to class with helping to run the family's cattle operation. He won respect from unions as a labor lawyer, got elected state attorney and went on to leadership posts in the Florida Senate."

== 2006 campaign for governor ==
In January 2005, Smith announced his candidacy for the Democratic nomination for governor in the 2006 election. Smith ran against Tampa Congressman Jim Davis. A statewide poll by the Florida Chamber of Commerce, released on August 28, 2006, showed Smith eight points down against Davis. A poll from earlier in the year showed Davis ahead 25 to 9 percent. Conversely, a July 27 Quinnipiac University poll showed Smith trailing Davis by 28%. However, this poll also revealed that 33% of Democrats were still undecided.

Late in May 2006, U.S. Representatives Kendrick Meek and Allen Boyd broke with their fellow Florida Democratic House members to endorse Smith. Smith was also endorsed by former Florida Attorney General Bob Butterworth and former state Sen. Tom Rossin, the 2002 Democratic candidate for lieutenant governor; state Sen. Dave Aronberg of Greenacres; the Palm Beach County State Attorney, Barry Krischer; and county Commissioner Addie Greene, among others. The co-chair of his campaign was former governor Wayne Mixson.

In August 2006, the St. Petersburg Times endorsed Smith, stating that his opponent, "Davis has a solid record as an ethical, thoughtful state legislator and congressman who understands the challenges facing Florida. Smith combines the same grasp of those challenges with a more dynamic leadership style and a clearer, fresher record of building mainstream coalitions that can successfully carry the day on tough issues. That is what it will take for a Democrat to win in November and successfully govern in Tallahassee."

At the same time, the Palm Beach Post endorsed Senator Smith, saying, "Rep. Davis would return to Tallahassee with good intentions. Sen. Smith would take office knowing how to get good things done." In addition, the Lakeland Ledger endorsed Smith stating, "We believe Smith can appeal to a broader segment of the electorate -- that he can muster greater support in the Republican-leaning northern part of the state while still generating strong support in the urban areas of Central and South Florida."

Later in the month, the South Florida Sun-Sentinel endorsed the Senator, noting that between Smith and Davis, "Smith's record is the more impressive of the two, and his familiarity with the Legislature and state government gives him the edge over Davis. Smith could literally win the November election and hit the ground running."

The Gainesville Sun also endorsed Smith saying, "Rod Smith is a superb orator, a skilled negotiator and ...a razor-sharp intellectual and a constitutional scholar who immerses himself in minutia of public policy making .... We think Rod Smith is the Democrat in this race who has the political capital to undo some of the damage that's been done to public education these past eight years, find the right balance between environmental protection and economic growth, protect Florida's fragile water resources and get a handle on the state's runaway health care costs without restricting access to quality care."

On August 27, the Miami Herald endorsed Senator Smith, noting his record of bipartisanship and stating, "In 2006, the Democratic Party has its best chance since the days of the late Lawton Chiles to recapture the governor's office."

Smith was criticized by media outlets for his allegedly-passive attitude toward Florida's sugar lobby and their attacks on his primary opponent. In August 2006, the Miami Herald wrote: "Sen. Smith has been the beneficiary of a million-dollar anti-Davis ad campaign by U.S. Sugar Inc. Senator Smith vows to remain independent. But it could prove difficult to keep a respectable distance from special interests if he becomes beholden to them for outsized political contributions." The Daytona Beach News-Journal, which had endorsed Smith, added further criticism. "What we find most disturbing is the response by state Sen. Rod Smith. Smith, who railed against smear tactics by third-party groups during his state senate campaigns, has consistently failed to rebuke Florida's Working Families (a notable front for Big Sugar interests) for the ads and, when asked, only repeats some of the allegations against Davis. Smith should denounce them."

On September 5, 2006, Rod Smith lost his bid for the Democratic nomination to Jim Davis. Davis subsequently lost the election to then Republican Charlie Crist.

Democratic primary results
Party	Candidate	Votes	%
Democratic	Jim Davis	405,879	47.32%
Democratic	Rod Smith	353,161	41.17%
Democratic	Carol Castagnero	45,161	5.267%
Democratic	Glenn Burkett	32,984	3.85%
Democratic	John M. Crotty	20,629	2.40%
Total votes		857,814	100.00%

== 2010 Election ==
On August 17, 2010, Rod Smith was announced as the running mate for Alex Sink on the Democratic ticket for the race to succeed Crist, who chose to run for election to the U.S. Senate rather than for re-election as governor. On November 2, the Sink/Smith ticket lost to the Republican Scott/Carroll ticket by a 1% margin.

== 2016 Election ==
When the Florida Supreme Court ordered the drawing of new state senate districts in December 2015, District 8, a newly formed district comprising Alachua County, Putnam County, and the northern half of Marion County opened up. On March 1, 2016, Smith announced his campaign for the seat against the then third-term Republican state representative Keith Perry. On November 8, Smith lost to Perry with 47.4% of the vote, a 5.2% margin.

== Florida Democratic Party ==
In November 2010 Smith was elected chairman of the Florida Democratic Party (FDP), succeeding Karen Thurman who resigned on November 12, 2010, following the midterm elections. Smith's term expired in January 2013 when he was succeeded by Allison Tant.

== Awards and honors ==
- Florida Police Chiefs Association's Legislative Achievement Award (2002)–for efforts to improve public safety and fight crime
- Voices of Children Foundation's MVP Leadership Award (2004)–for efforts on behalf of abused, abandoned and neglected children.
- Florida AFL-CIO "Legislator of the Year"–efforts on behalf of organized labor
- Named the "most effective Democrat in the Florida Senate" by the Miami Herald in 2003.

== Beliefs ==
Senator Smith is generally regarded as a political moderate and has traditionally taken stances more conservative than the average Democrat. For example, he has received an "A" rating from the National Rifle Association (NRA). Still, during the first televised debate of the 2006 Democratic primary, Smith stated that he had "no problem with a carefully defined assault weapons ban. We want to make sure we don't have weapons in the hands of people who aren't supposed to have them and we have tough laws to prevent that." Smith has stated that he supports, and is a principal architect of, legislation requiring parental notification for minors seeking an abortion but would "leave an exception for the health and life of the mother." Smith describes himself as pro-choice and his official website promised to, "veto any legislation that would allow the government more influence over a woman's personal and private decisions regarding her own body."

Over the course of the 2006 gubernatorial primary, both Smith and his Democratic primary opponent took many positions not generally associated with the Democratic Party. The latter (Davis) voted for the Iraq War and "also voted to ban flag-burning." Both men agreed on capital punishment and both agreed on having only, as Davis put it, "some restrictions on assault weapons."

== Personal life ==
Smith and his wife, DeeDee, live on their farm in Alachua County. As reported in Tampa Bay Online Smith, "married Deidra 'DeeDee' Painter, a lawyer .... They have three kids, one together and one each from previous marriages." DeeDee Smith graduated from law school at age 39 and is an attorney and advocate for child abuse victims.

Smith has 1 daughter, Alison Glover, and 2 sons, Jesse Smith and Dylan Smith. He also has, as of January 2018, four grandchildren. Two from Alison and her husband, Graham Glover, named Hannah Grace and Graham, Jr., and two from Jesse and his wife, Jan, named Norah Lucille and Charlotte Warren.

== Sources ==
1. Dennis, Brady. "Rod Smith." St. Petersburg Times. July 7, 2006.
2. Sun-Sentinel Editorial Board. "Governor." Sun-Sentinel August 20, 2006.
3. Reinhard, Beth. "Underdog candidates get a final chance to make their mark." Miami Herald. August 26, 2006.
4. Davis, Jennifer Krell. "Democratic Race In Dead Heat Says Florida Chamber Poll." "Florida Chamber of Commerce". June 8, 2006.
5. Smith, Adam C. "Jim Davis can't shake Rod Smith." St. Petersburg Times. May 22, 2006.
6. Crowley, Brian. "Local support for Smith grows." Palm Beach Post. June 24, 2006.
7. Times Editorial Board. "Smith for Democrats." St. Petersburg Times. August 12, 2006.
8. "Democrats: Smith." Palm Beach Post. August 13, 2006.
9. "Democrats: Smith for Governor." Lakeland Ledger August 13, 2006.
10. "Rod Smith, Democrat," The Gainesville Sun August 20, 2006.
11. "In 2006, the Democratic Party has its best chance since the days of..." Miami Herald August 27, 2006.
12. Bennett, George. "Smith says he can woo votes for Democrats." Palm Beach Post. July 9, 2006.
13. Kleindienst, Linda. "Where Jim Davis and Rod Smith stand." Sun-Sentinel August 24, 2006.
14. Fechter, Michael. "Rural Route to the Top." TBO.com news. August 8, 2006.
15. Shah, Nirvi. "Gubernatorial candidates' wives toe the party." Palm Beach Post. June 26, 2006.
16. Farrington, Brendan. "Sink taps Smith as running mate in Fla. Gov's race." Miami Herald. August 17, 2010.

Legal offices
Preceded by Len Register	State Attorney for the Eighth Judicial Circuit Court of Florida; 1992–2000	Succeeded by Bill Cervone
Florida Senate
Preceded by George Kirkpatrick	Member of the Florida Senate from the 5th district 2000–2002	Succeeded by Stephen Wise
Preceded by Buddy Dyer	Member of the Florida Senate from the 14th district 2002–2006	Succeeded by Steve Oelrich
Party political offices
Preceded by Daryl Jones	Democratic nominee for Lieutenant Governor of Florida; 2010	Succeeded by Annette Taddeo
Preceded by Karen Thurman	Chair of the Florida Democratic Party; 2010–2013	Succeeded by Allison Tant
