= Paul Renner (politician) =

American politician (born 1967)

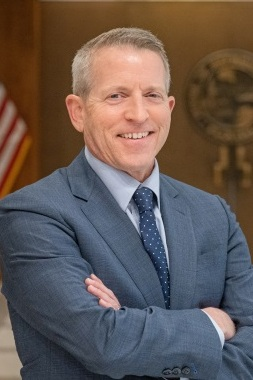
- Official portrait, 2022

103rd Speaker of the Florida House of Representatives
- In office November 22, 2022 – November 19, 2024
- Preceded by: Chris Sprowls
- Succeeded by: Daniel Perez

Member of the Florida House of Representatives
- In office April 8, 2015 – November 5, 2024
- Preceded by: Travis Hutson
- Succeeded by: Samuel Greco
- Constituency: 24th district (2015–2022); 19th district (2022–2024)

Personal details
- Born: Paul Marvin Renner; March 21, 1967 (age 59) Atlanta, Georgia, U.S.
- Party: Republican
- Spouse: Adriana Renner
- Education: Davidson College (BA); University of Florida (JD)

Paul Marvin Renner (born March 21, 1967) is an American lawyer and politician who served as the Speaker of the Florida House of Representatives for the 2022–24 Florida Legislature. He was in office as a state representative from an April 2015 special election through November 2024, where he represented the 19th district, which includes Flagler County and parts of lower St. Johns County.

On September 3, 2025, Renner announced his candidacy in the 2026 Florida gubernatorial election.

== Early life, education, and career ==
Renner was born in Atlanta, Georgia, and grew up in Florida. He attended Davidson College, where he graduated with his bachelor's degree in history in 1989. After graduation, he joined the United States Navy, serving as a Surface Warfare Officer, and provided combat operations support in the Gulf War.

Following his active duty military service, Renner attended the Fredric G. Levin College of Law at the University of Florida, receiving his Juris Doctor in 1994. He then served as an assistant state attorney, where he supervised misdemeanor attorneys and prosecuted felony offenses in the Felony Trial Unit. He later shifted to commercial and corporate law, working as a partner at Milam Howard Nicandri Dees & Gillam.

As a reservist, Renner was mobilized to active duty and served in support of combat operations in Afghanistan in 2011.

== Florida House of Representatives ==
In 2014, when incumbent State Representative Daniel Davis declined to seek a third term in the legislature, Renner ran to succeed him in the 15th District, which included parts of downtown Jacksonville in western Duval County. He faced banker Jay Fant in the Republican primary, and a brutal election soon began. Though the two candidates aligned closely on ideological issues, Renner emphasized his leadership credentials through his military service and his career as a prosecutor. Renner was endorsed by Davis, whom he aimed to replace; State Senator John E. Thrasher, Duval County Sheriff John Rutherford, and United States Congressman Ron DeSantis, as well as local business organizations. During the campaign, Renner was attacked by third-party groups over his alleged support for gambling, which he objected to, noting that he had expressed his opposition to the expansion of gambling and had signed a pledge with No Casinos to indicate his opposition. He emphasized his support for reducing crime, declaring, "I think the first priority of government has got to be public safety. We've got to fight crime in our community, and I'm committed to doing that as well." Ultimately, the election proved to be close, as Fant finished just three votes ahead of Renner. Following a manual recount, Fant's margin of victory was reduced to two votes, and Renner conceded to him.

When State Representative Travis Hutson resigned his seat to run in a State Senate special election, Renner moved into the 24th District, which was 4 districts to the south of the 15th District, so that he could run to succeed Hutson. He was opposed by former St. Johns County Commissioner Ron Sanchez and Danielle Anderson in the Republican primary, and emphasized his support for economic development, education, veterans issues, and tourism, noting that the district needs to get its "fair share" of state appropriations. In contrast to the close election less than a year earlier, Renner cruised to victory in a landslide, receiving 70% of the vote to Sanchez's 18% and Anderson's 12%. He advanced to the general election, where he faced Adam Morley, the Democratic nominee and small business owner. Renner was endorsed by The Florida Times-Union, which praised his "detailed, diverse resume that makes jaws drop" and suggested that he would be a "sensible and pragmatic legislator," and by The St. Augustine Record, which noted that he "has proven commitment and leadership in his military career." Renner ended up defeating Morley by a comfortable margin, receiving 67% of the vote to Morley's 33%.

== Florida Board of Governors ==
On April 15, 2025, Renner joined the Board of Governors for the State University System of Florida. In that capacity, he opposed the appointment of Santa Ono as president of the University of Florida and was one of 10 board members who successfully voted to reject Ono's appointment. At the time, Renner commented that "he was not worried about finding a qualified president because [the University of] Florida is 'one of the top universities in the nation and not everybody has the same awful record that Dr. Ono has.'"

== 2026 gubernatorial campaign ==
During his 2026 campaign for Governor, Renner held an event announcing his opposition to Sharia, or Islamic law. Renner said that Islam is incompatible with American society, and called for restrictions on Muslim immigration to the United States. Renner said that Sharia could potentially be forcibly imposed in the United States.

Political offices
Preceded by Chris Sprowls	Speaker of the Florida House of Representatives; 2022–2024	Succeeded by Daniel Perez
