= Howell Lancaster =

American politician

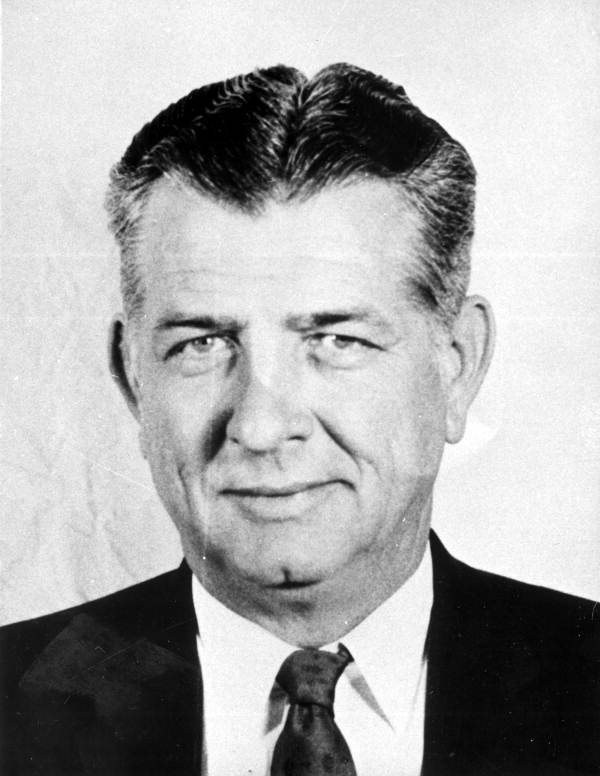
- Lancaster in 1961

Member of the Florida House of Representatives from Gilchrist County
- In office 1949–1966

Member of the Florida House of Representatives from the 15th district
- In office 1968–1972
- Preceded by: Leon McDonald
- Succeeded by: Leon McDonald

Personal details
- Born: Howell Eugene Lancaster; July 31, 1911 Eugene, Florida, U.S.
- Died: January 5, 1972 (aged 60) Columbia County, Florida, U.S.
- Party: Democratic
- Education: University of Florida

Howell Eugene Lancaster (July 31, 1911 – January 5, 1972) was an American politician. A member of the Democratic Party, he served in the Florida House of Representatives from 1949 to 1966 and again from 1968 to 1972.

== Life and career ==
Lancaster was born in Eugene, Florida, the son of Raleigh and Lollie Lancaster. He attended and graduated from the University of Florida. After graduating, he worked as a farmer.

Lancaster served in the Florida House of Representatives from 1949 to 1966 and again from 1968 to 1972. During his service in the House, in the 1950s, he served as leader of the Pork Chop Gang, a group of legislators from rural areas that dominated the state legislature due to malapportionment and used their power to engage in McCarthyist tactics.

== Death ==
Lancaster died on January 5, 1972, of an apparent heart attack while on a hunting trip in Columbia County, Florida, at the age of 60.
