= 1986 Florida gubernatorial election =

- November 4, 1986
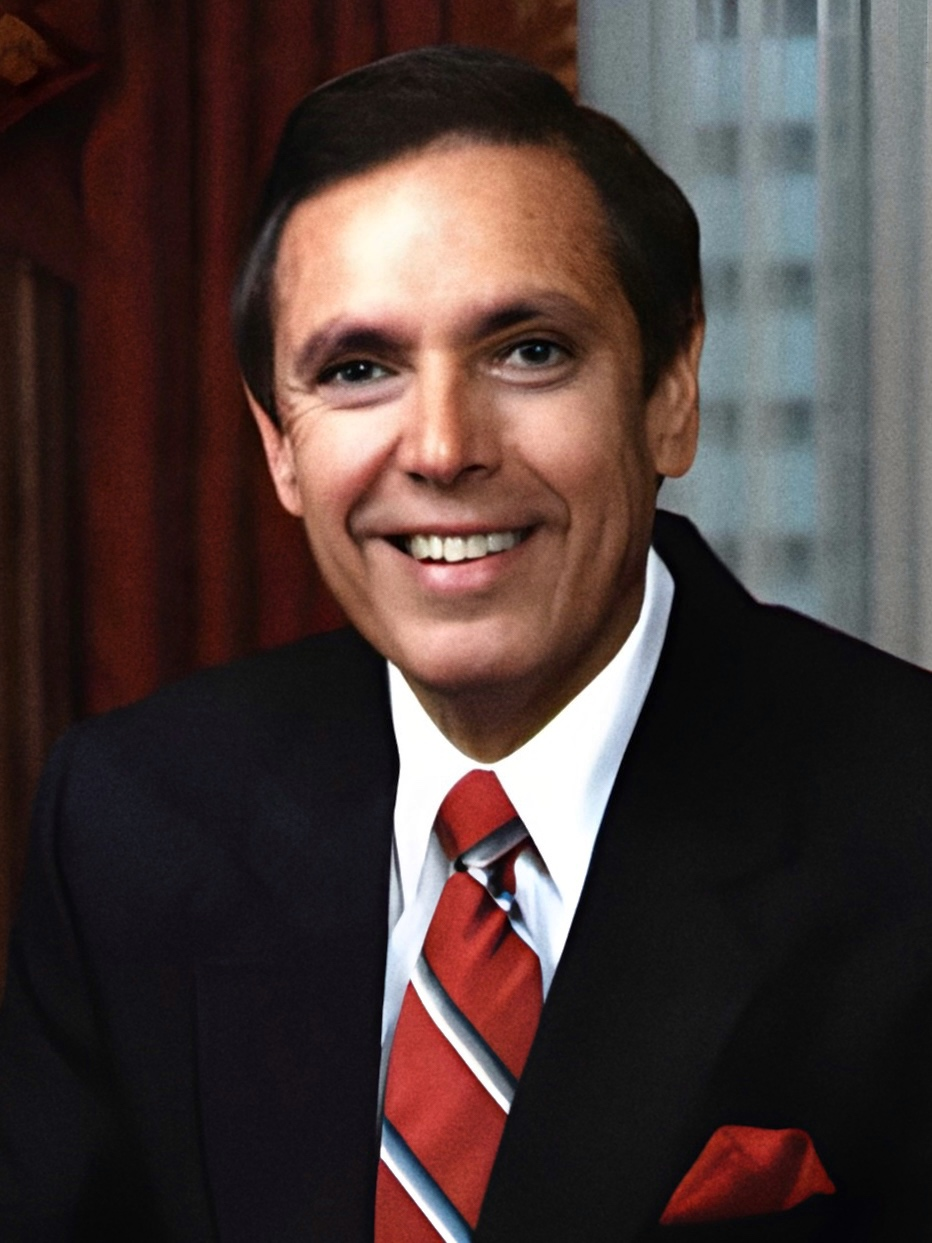

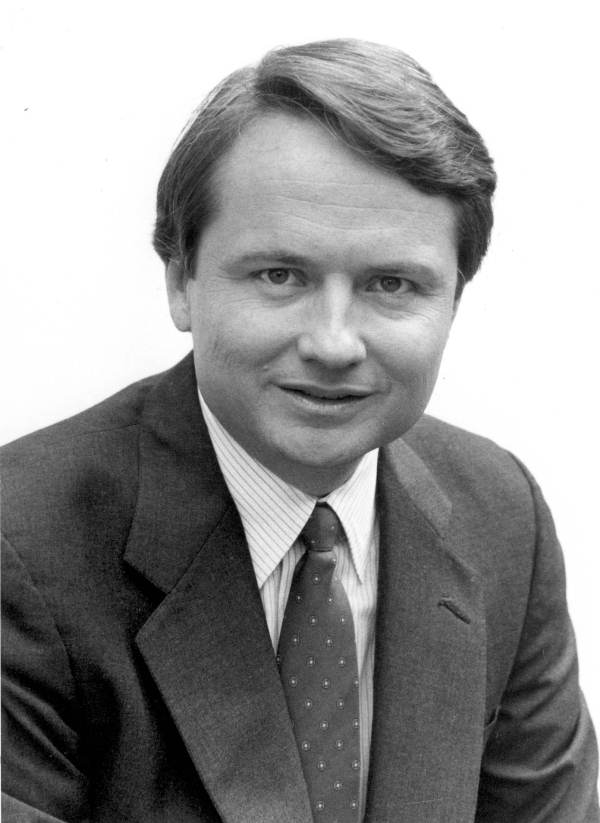
Nominee	Bob Martinez	Steve Pajcic
Party	Republican	Democratic
Running mate	Bobby Brantley	Franklin B. Mann
Popular vote	1,847,525	1,538,620
Percentage	54.56%	45.44%
- County results Martinez: 50–60% 60–70% 70–80% Pajcic: 50–60% 60–70%
Governor before election
Bob Graham
Democratic
Elected Governor
Bob Martinez
Republican

The 1986 Florida gubernatorial election took place alongside the midterm congressional elections. The Democratic Party won many victories across the country (including retaking the Senate). However, in Florida, where Democrats gained the Senate seat from Republicans, they lost the Governorship for just the second time since Reconstruction.

The primaries took place on September 2, the runoffs on September 30, and the general election on November 4, 1986. This was the last time Republicans won Palm Beach County until 2022, and the last time that Democrats won Duval County until 2018.

== Democratic nomination ==
Democratic Primary Runoff by county Pajcic: 50–60%; 60–70%; 70–80%; Smith: 50–60%; 60–70%; 70–80%

=== Candidates ===
- Mark Kane Goldstein, former Mayor of Gainesville
- Harry Johnston, State Senator from West Palm Beach
- Steve Pajcic, State Representative from Jacksonville
- James C. Smith, Attorney General of Florida
- Joan Wollin, attorney

Democratic primary results
Party	Candidate	Votes	%
Democratic	Steve Pajcic	360,900	35.89%
Democratic	James C. Smith	309,908	30.82%
Democratic	Harry Johnston	257,906	25.65%
Democratic	Mark Kane Goldstein	54,060	5.38%
Democratic	Joan L. Wollin	22,691	2.26%
Total votes		1,005,465	100.00%

Democratic primary runoff results
Party	Candidate	Votes	%
Democratic	Steve Pajcic	429,527	50.64%
Democratic	James C. Smith	418,614	49.36%
Total votes		848,041	100.00%

== Republican nomination ==
Republican Primary Runoff by county Martinez: 50–60%; 60–70%; 70–80%; 80–90%; Frey: 50–60%; 60–70%

=== Candidates ===
- Chester Clem, State Representative from Vero Beach
- Lou Frey, U.S. Representative from Orlando and candidate for Governor in 1978
- Tom Gallagher, State Representative from Coconut Grove, Miami
- Bob Martinez, Mayor of Tampa

==== Withdrew ====
- William G. Myers, state senator from Jupiter

=== Declined ===
- Jeb Bush, chair of the Dade County Republican Party and son of vice president George Bush

Republican primary results
Party	Candidate	Votes	%
Republican	Bob Martinez	244,417	43.80%
Republican	Lou Frey	137,967	24.72%
Republican	Tom Gallagher	131,265	23.52%
Republican	Chester Clem	44,409	7.96%
Total votes		558,058	100.00%

Republican primary runoff results
Party	Candidate	Votes	%
Republican	Bob Martinez	259,333	66.33%
Republican	Lou Frey	131,652	33.67%
Total votes		390,985	100.00%

== General election ==
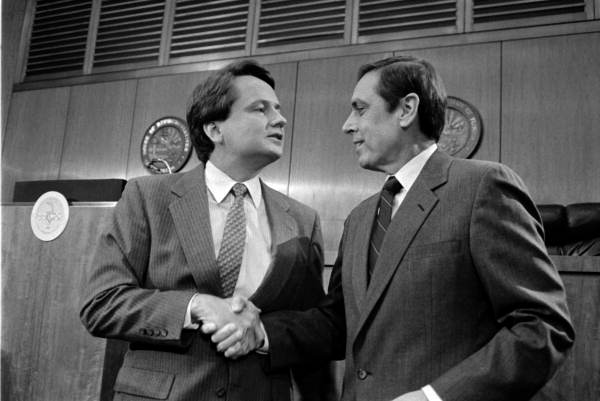
Bob Martinez and Steve Pajcic wish each other luck before their gubernatorial debate

Florida gubernatorial election, 1986
Party	Candidate	Votes	%	±%
Republican	Bob Martinez	1,847,525	54.56%	+19.26
Democratic	Steve Pajcic	1,538,620	45.44%	−19.26
Write-in		27	0.00	N/A
Majority		308,905	9.12	−20.28
Turnout		3,386,172	100.00%	N/A
Republican gain from Democratic		Swing		
