= Ralph Tyre =

American politician (1933–2019)

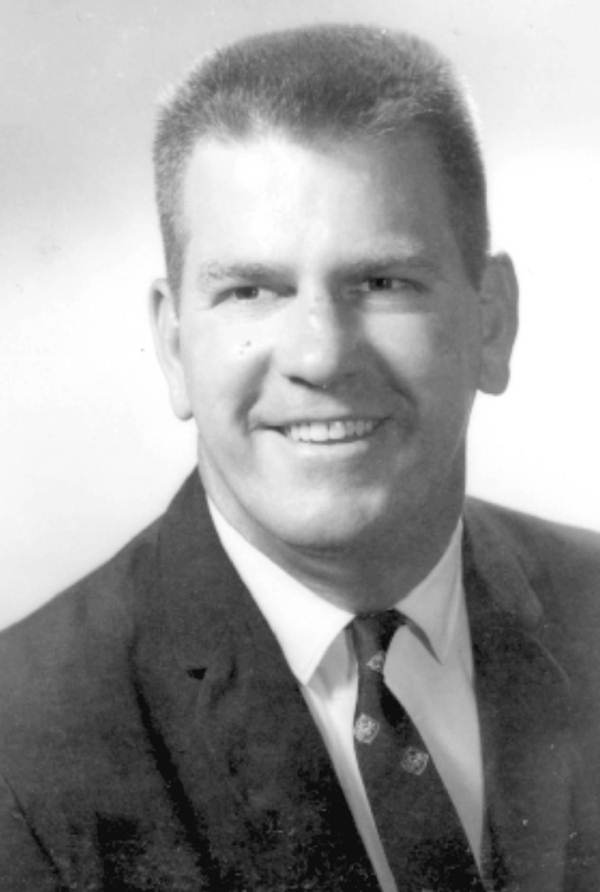

Member of the Florida House of Representatives for the 17th district
- In office 1961–1970

Personal details
- Born: September 19, 1933 Lake City, Florida, U.S.
- Died: May 4, 2019 (aged 85) Old Town, Florida, U.S.
- Party: Democratic

Ralph Charles Tyre (September 19, 1933 – May 4, 2019) was an American former politician in the state of Florida.

Tyre was born in Lake City, Florida. He was a proprietor. He served in the Florida House of Representatives from 1967 to 1970, as a Democrat, representing the 17th district.
