= Leon McDonald =

American politician

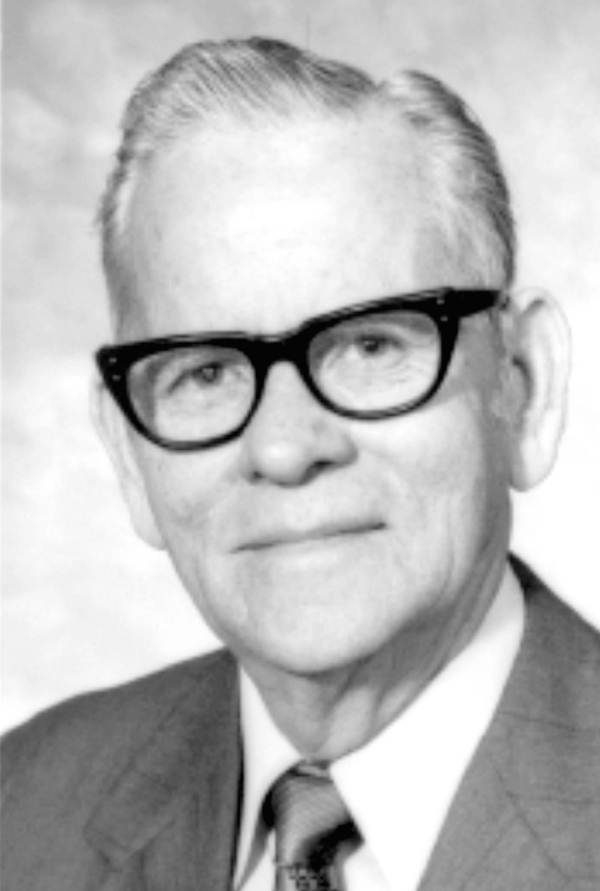
- McDonald in 1972

Member of the Florida House of Representatives from Suwannee County
- In office 1961–1967

Member of the Florida House of Representatives from the 15th district
- In office 1967–1968
- Preceded by: District established
- Succeeded by: Howell Lancaster
- In office 1972–1972
- Preceded by: Howell Lancaster
- Succeeded by: George Grosse

Member of the Florida House of Representatives from the 13th district
- In office 1972–1974
- Preceded by: Donald L. Tucker
- Succeeded by: Pete Skinner

Personal details
- Born: Leon Nickson McDonald; January 15, 1916
- Died: August 23, 1993 (aged 77)
- Party: Democratic

Leon Nickson McDonald (January 15, 1916 – August 23, 1993) was an American politician. A member of the Democratic Party, he served in the Florida House of Representatives from 1961 to 1968 and again from 1972 to 1974.
