= Florida's 19th House of Representatives district =

American legislative district

Florida's 19th State House of Representatives district
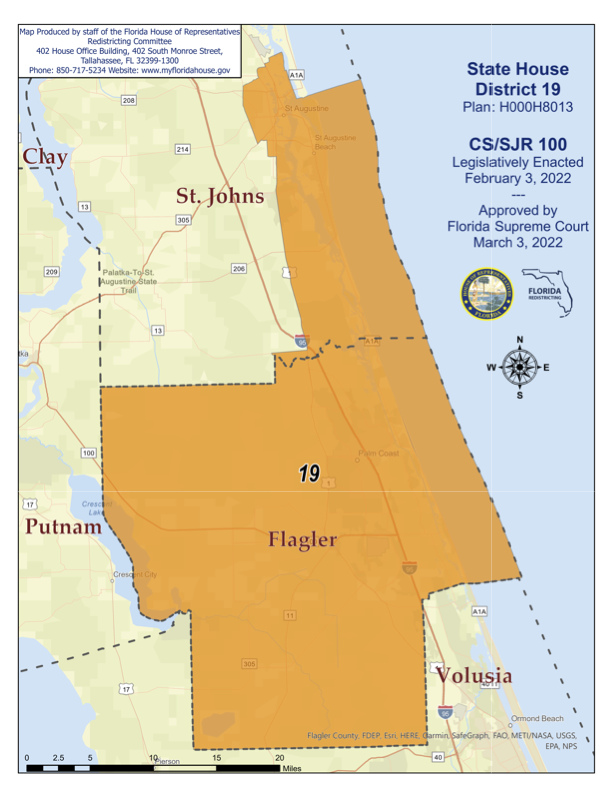
Representative
Sam Greco; R–St. Augustine
- Population (2024): 195,095

Florida's 19th House district elects one member of the Florida House of Representatives. The district is represented by Sam Greco. This district is located in Northeast Florida, and encompasses part of the First Coast. The district comprises all of Flagler County and the southeastern portion of St. Johns County, including both the cities of St. Augustine and St. Augustine Beach.

This district contains Flagler College, the University of St. Augustine for Health Sciences, and a campus of St. Johns River State College in St. Augustine, as well as a campus of Daytona State College in Palm Coast.

The district was represented by Paul Renner from 2022 to 2024, during which time he served as Speaker of the Florida House of Representatives. From 1992 to 2000, the district was represented by John Thrasher who served as Speaker of the Florida House of Representatives from 1998 to 2000.

== Representatives from 1988 to the present ==
Representatives by party affiliation
Party	Representatives
Republican	8
Democratic	0

#	Name	Term of service	Residence	Political party
1	Joseph Arnall	1988–1992	Jacksonville Beach	Republican
2	John Thrasher	1992–2000	Orange Park	Republican
3	Richard Kravitz	2000–2008	Jacksonville	Republican
4	Michael Weinstein	2008–2012	Jacksonville	Republican
5	Charles Van Zant	2012–2016	Keystone Heights	Republican
6	Bobby Payne	2016–2022	Palatka	Republican
7	Paul Renner	2022–2024	Palm Coast	Republican
8	Sam Greco	2024–present	St. Augustine	Republican

== See also ==
- Florida's 7th Senate district
- Florida's 5th congressional district
- Florida's 6th congressional district
