= Stephen Wise (politician) =

American politician

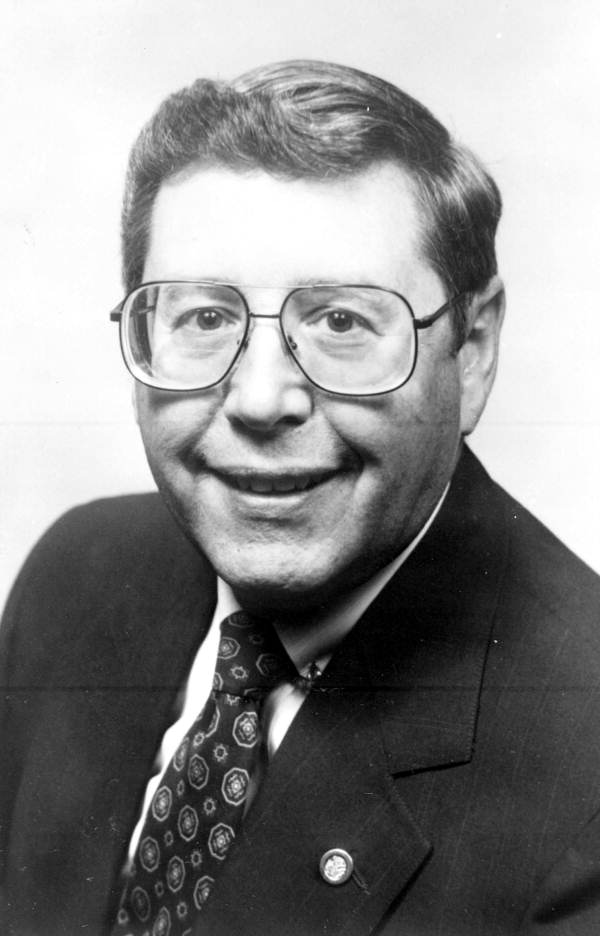

Member of the Florida Senate from the 5th district
- In office November 5, 2002 – November 6, 2012
- Preceded by: Rod Smith
- Succeeded by: Charles Dean

Member of the Florida Senate from the 6th district
- In office September 25, 2001 – November 5, 2002
- Preceded by: Jim Horne
- Succeeded by: Al Lawson

Member of the Florida House of Representatives from the 13th district
- In office November 3, 1992 – November 7, 2000
- Preceded by: George Crady
- Succeeded by: Mike Hogan

Member of the Florida House of Representatives from the 14th district
- In office November 8, 1988 – November 3, 1992
- Preceded by: Carl Ogden
- Succeeded by: Tony Hill

Personal details
- Born: December 11, 1941 (age 84) Canton, Ohio
- Party: Republican
- Spouse: Kathryn Beeman
- Profession: Educator

Stephen R. Wise was an American politician. He was Republican member of the Florida Senate, who served the 6th District from September 2001 to November 2002, and the 5th district from November 2002, to November 2012 .

Wise was born in Canton, Ohio on December 11, 1941.

He was a member of the Florida House of Representatives for the 14th district from November 1988, to November 1992, and the 13th district from November 1992, to November 2000.

Florida House of Representatives
Preceded by Carl Ogden	Member of the Florida House of Representatives from the 14th district 1988–1992	Succeeded by Tony Hill
Preceded by George Crady	Member of the Florida House of Representatives from the 13th district 1992–2000	Succeeded by Mike Hogan
Florida Senate
Preceded by Jim Horne	Member of the Florida Senate from the 6th district 2001–2002	Succeeded by Al Lawson
Preceded by Rod Smith	Member of the Florida Senate from the 5th district 2002–2012	Succeeded by Charles Dean
