= George Kirkpatrick (Florida politician) =

American politician (1938–2003)

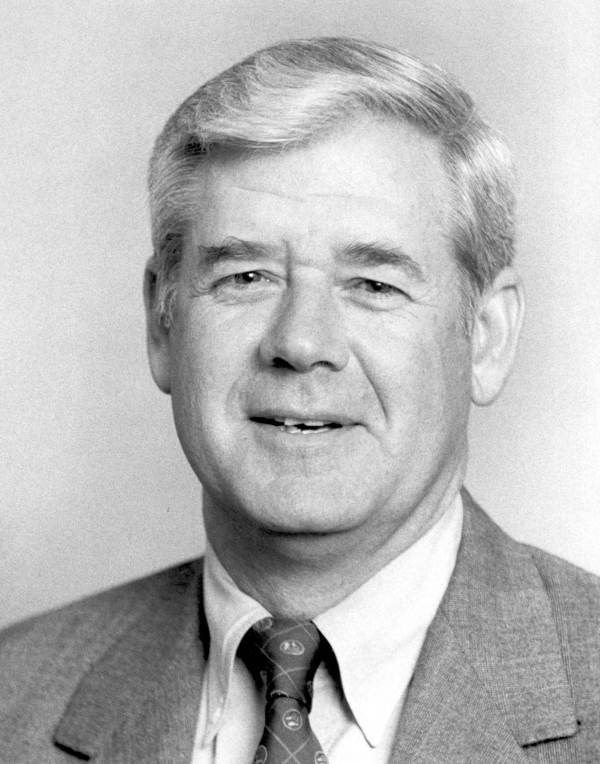

Member of the Florida Senate
- In office November 4, 1980 – November 7, 2000
- Preceded by: Buddy MacKay
- Succeeded by: Rod Smith
- Constituency: 6th district (1980–1992); 5th district (1992–2000)

Personal details
- Born: December 24, 1938 Gainesville, Florida
- Died: February 5, 2003 (aged 64) Tallahassee, Florida
- Party: Republican (1998–2003); Democratic (before 1998)
- Spouse: Monika Godzewski
- Children: 2
- Education: Davidson College (B.S.)

Military service
- Allegiance: United States
- Branch/service: United States Army
- Years of service: 1962–1964
- Unit: Military Police Corps

George Grier Kirkpatrick Jr. (December 24, 1938 – February 5, 2003) was a Republican politician from Florida who served as a member of the Florida Senate from 1980 to 2000. He was initially elected as a Democrat, but switched to the Republican Party in 1998.

== Early life ==
Kirkpatrick was born in Gainesville, Florida, in 1938, and graduated from Davidson College with his bachelor's degree in psychology in 1962. He served in the Military Police Corps in West Berlin from 1962 to 1964. Upon returning to Florida, he worked as a real estate investor and builder.

== Florida Senate ==
In 1980, when Democratic State Senator Buddy MacKay ran for Congress, Kirkpatrick ran to succeed him in the 6th district. He faced former Alachua County Commissioner Perry McGriff and preacher Gene Keith in the Democratic primary. McGriff placed first in the primary election, winning 40 percent of the vote to Kirkpatrick's 34 percent, and the two advanced to a runoff election. Kirkpatrick narrowly defeated McGriff, winning 53 percent of the vote to his 47 percent, and advanced to the runoff election, where he faced Republican nominee John Newsom, a citrus farmer. Kirkpatrick defeated Newsom in a landslide, winning 68–32 percent.

Kirkpatrick ran for re-election in 1982, and was challenged by Margaret Eppes, an educational film producer, who attacked him for his opposition to the Equal Rights Amendment and for making a joke about "laying back and enjoying it" during a speech. Kirkpatrick ultimately won renomination, defeating Eppes with 59 percent of the vote, and faced no opponent in the general election.

In 1986, Kirkpatrick was challenged in the primary by Jo Ann Doke Smith, the former head of the Florida Cattlemen's Association. Smith criticized Kirkpatrick for his alliance with South Florida legislators, and won the endorsement of the National Rifle Association. Kirkpatrick defeated Smith, winning 55 percent of the vote to her 45 percent, and was re-elected unopposed in the general election.

Kirkpatrick ran for re-election to a third term in 1990, and faced Republican Ben Campen, a businessman, in the general election. He defeated Campen in a landslide, winning re-election with 66 percent of the vote.

Following redistricting, Kirkpatrick ran for re-election in the 5th district, which included most of the territory he previously represented. He was only opposed by Richard "Whitey" Markle, a laboratory technician who mounted a write-in campaign. Kirkpatrick easily won re-election, winning 96 percent of the vote. He was unopposed for re-election in 1996.

In 1998, Kirkpatrick switched to the Republican Party, increasing the party's majority in the Florida Senate to 25–15. He was term-limited in 2000 and was succeeded by Democrat Rod Smith.

== Death ==
Kirkpatrick died on February 5, 2003.
