= Florida's 5th Senate district =

American legislative district

Florida's 5th State Senate district
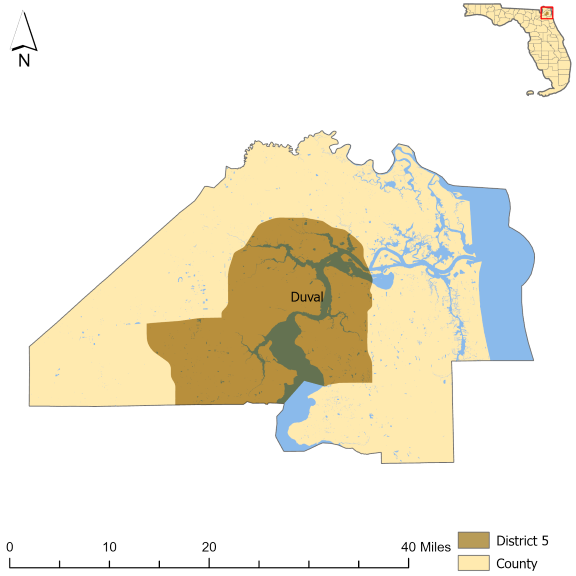
- Interactive map of district boundary since January 3, 2023
Senator
Tracie Davis; D
- Demographics: 39% White; 41% Black; 11% Hispanic; 4% Asian; 4% Multiracial
- Population (2023): 546,988

Florida's 5th Senate district elects one member of the Florida Senate. The district consists of part of Duval county, in the U.S. state of Florida. The current senator is Democrat Tracie Davis.

== List of senators ==
NOTE: The following Information was gathered from the Florida Senate website. Only records of senators from 1998–present are kept.

Portrait	Name	Party	Years of service	Home city/state	Notes
	George Kirkpatrick	Republican	1992–2000	Gainesville, Florida	Consisted of Parts of Alachua, Bradford, Clay, Columbia, Levy, Marion, Putnan, Suwannee, and Union countyw
	Rod Smith	Democratic	2000–2002	Southwest City, Missouri	Consisted of Parts of Alachua, Bradford, Clay, Columbia, Levy, Marion, Putnan, Suwannee, and Union county
	Stephen Wise	Republican	2002–2012	Canton, Ohio	Consisted of parts of Clay, Duval, Nassau, St. Johns counties
	Charles Dean	Republican	2012–2016	Jacksonville, Florida	Consisted of Baker, Citrus, Columbia, Dixie, Gilchrist, Lafayette, Levy, Suwannee, Union counties and part of Marion county
	Rob Bradley	Republican	2016–2020	Green Cove Springs, Florida	Consisted of Baker, Bradford, Clay, Columbia, Dixie, Gilchrist, Lafayette, Levy, Suwannee, Union counties and part of Marion county
	Jennifer Bradley	Republican	2020–2022	Tokyo, Japan	Consisted of Baker, Bradford, Clay, Columbia, Dixie, Gilchrist, Lafayette, Levy, Suwannee, Union counties and part of Marion county
	Tracie Davis	Democratic	2022–Present	Jacksonville, Florida	Consists of part of Duval county

== Elections ==
NOTE: The following results were gathered from the Florida Department of State. Uncontested election results are not provided.

=== 1980 ===
Democratic Primary (1980)
Party	Candidate	Votes	%
Democratic	Michael Geison	9,618	10.3%
Democratic	Sherill "Pete" Skinner	67,277	72.1%
Democratic	O. A. Winburn, Jr.	16,380	17.6%
Total votes		93,265	100%

=== 1982 ===
Democratic Primary (1982)
Party	Candidate	Votes	%
Democratic	Jane Bell	2,098	3.8%
Democratic	Doyle Conner, Jr.	9,455	17.0%
Democratic	Jim Crews	16,255	29.3%
Democratic	Bill Grant	19,137	34.5%
Democratic	Jim Senterfitt	1,782	3.2%
Democratic	Bill Sutton	6,781	12.2%
Total votes		55,508	100%

Democratic Primary Runoff (1982)
Party	Candidate	Votes	%
Democratic	Jim Crews	19,389	39.2%
Democratic	Bill Grant	30,023	60.8%
Total votes		49,412	100%

=== 1986 ===
Democratic Primary (1986)
Party	Candidate	Votes	%
Democratic	Eldridge Beach	8,166	14.2%
Democratic	Wayne Hollingsworth	27,571	48.1%
Democratic	Michael R. Moore	7,541	13.1%
Democratic	Doug Nichols	14,084	24.6%
Total votes		57,362	100%

Democratic Primary Runoff (1986)
Party	Candidate	Votes	%
Democratic	Wayne Hollingsworth	29,449	53.2%
Democratic	Doug Nichols	25,879	46.8%
Total votes		55,328	100%

General Election (1986)
Party	Candidate	Votes	%
Democratic	Wayne Hollingsworth	61,922	79.9%
Republican	Pat Cook	15,612	20.1%
Total votes		77,534	100%

=== 1988 ===
Democratic Primary (1988)
Party	Candidate	Votes	%
Democratic	Wayne Hollingsworth	32,217	47.1%
Democratic	Sherry D. Walker	36,246	52.9%
Total votes		68,463	100%

=== 1992 ===
General Election (1992)
Party	Candidate	Votes	%
Democratic	George Kirkpatrick	89,538	96.1%
Write-In	Richard "Whitey" Markle	3,603	3.9%
Total votes		94,141	100%

=== 2000 ===
Democratic Primary (2000)
Party	Candidate	Votes	%
Democratic	Cynthia Moore Chestnut	17,555	38.4%
Democratic	Rod Smith	28,152	61.6%
Total votes		45,707	100%

Democratic Primary (2000)
Party	Candidate	Votes	%
Republican	Bob Casey	63,085	43.3%
Democratic	Rod Smith	82,301	56.6%
Write-In	Emily Browne	150	0.1%
Total votes		145,536	100%

=== 2004 ===
Republican Primary (2004)
Party	Candidate	Votes	%
Republican	Alan M. Rankin	10,127	19.6%
Republican	Stephen Wise	41,431	80.4%
Total votes		51,558	100%

General Election (2004)
Party	Candidate	Votes	%
Republican	Stephen Wise	181,995	99.8%
Write-In	David Organes	236	0.1%
Write-In	Samuel L. Sasser	80	0.0%
Total votes		182,311	100%

=== 2008 ===
General Election (2008)
Party	Candidate	Votes	%
Republican	Stephen Wise	172,736	71.4%
Democratic	George Anthony Lovengut	69,321	28.6%
Total votes		242,229	100%

=== 2020 ===
Republican Primary (2020)
Party	Candidate	Votes	%
Republican	Jennifer Bradley	47,395	59.0%
Republican	Jason G. Holifield	32,944	41.0%
Total votes		80,339	100%

General Election (2020)
Party	Candidate	Votes	%
Republican	Jennifer Bradley	194,198	74.8%
Democratic	Stacey L. Peters	65,568	25.2%
Total votes		259,766	100%

=== 2022 ===
Democratic Primary (2022)
Party	Candidate	Votes	%
Democratic	Tracie Davis	34,075	68.1%
Democratic	Reggie Gaffney	15,996	31.9%
Total votes		50,071	100%

General Election (2022)
Party	Candidate	Votes	%
Republican	Binod Kumar	64,028	42.5%
Democratic	Tracie Davis	86,784	57.5%
Write-In	Patrick Lee Cooper	0	0.0%
Total votes		150,812	100%

=== 2024 ===
Democratic Primary (2024)
Party	Candidate	Votes	%
Democratic	Tracie Davis	31,999	95.2%
Democratic	Francky L. Jeanty	1,628	4.5%
Total votes		33,627	100%

General Election (2024)
Party	Candidate	Votes	%
Democratic	Tracie Davis	156,112	99.6%
Write-In	Vernon Lee Parker	703	0.4%
Total votes		150,812	100%
