= 2024 United States presidential election in Illinois =

- November 5, 2024
- Turnout: 70.42% (▼2.5 pp)

| Nominee | Kamala Harris | Donald Trump |
| Party | Democratic | Republican |
| Home state | California | Florida |
| Running mate | Tim Walz | JD Vance |
| Electoral vote | 19 | 0 |
| Popular vote | 3,062,863 | 2,449,079 |
| Percentage | 54.37% | 43.47% |

Harris
30–40%
40–50%
50–60%
60–70%
70–80%
80–90%
90–100%
Trump
20–30%
40–50%
50–60%
60–70%
70–80%
80–90%
90–100%
Tie
President before election
Joe Biden
Democratic
Elected President
Donald Trump
Republican

The 2024 United States presidential election in Illinois took place on Tuesday, November 5, 2024, as part of the 2024 United States presidential election in which all 50 states plus the District of Columbia participated. Illinois voters chose electors to represent them in the Electoral College via a popular vote. The state of Illinois has 19 electoral votes in the Electoral College this election, following reapportionment due to the 2020 United States census in which the state lost a seat.

Illinois is a strongly blue state in the Great Lakes region anchored by Chicago, with the sparsely populated southern region of the state being culturally influenced by the Upper South and Bible Belt. It has a reputation for being one of the more liberal states of the Great Lakes Region. The state has voted for the Democratic candidate in every presidential election beginning in 1992 (doing so by at least 10% each time), including voting for Senator Barack Obama from Illinois in 2008 and 2012 and Chicago-born Hillary Clinton in 2016. This was the first election since 1868 in which Illinois did not have 20 or more electoral votes.

Illinois was won by the Democratic candidate Kamala Harris. Illinois shifted noticeably towards Trump, with Harris winning the state by under an 11 point margin, six points down from Biden. The state’s red shift was caused by low Democratic turnout in Cook County (home to Chicago), with Harris receiving about 300,000 fewer votes than Biden in Cook County, while Trump ran marginally ahead of his 2020 raw vote total in Chicago, Cook as a whole, and statewide. Trump became the first Republican to win the White House without Kendall County or McLean County. Illinois voted to the right of Colorado for the first time since 1964.

== Primary elections ==
=== Democratic primary ===
The Illinois Democratic primary was held on March 19, 2024, alongside primaries in Arizona, Florida, (Note: The state party only nominated Joe Biden as a candidate, cancelling the primary.) Kansas, and Ohio.

2024 Illinois Democratic pres. primary
| Candidate | Votes | % | Delegates |
|---|---|---|---|
| Joe Biden (incumbent) | 739,646 | 91.48 | 147 |
| Marianne Williamson | 28,777 | 3.56 | 0 |
| Dean Phillips (withdrawn) | 25,615 | 3.17 | 0 |
| Frankie Lozada (withdrawn) | 14,513 | 1.79 | 0 |
| Total | 808,551 | 100% | 147 |

=== Republican primary ===
The Illinois Republican primary was held on March 19, 2024, alongside primaries in Arizona, Florida, and Ohio.

Illinois Republican primary, March 19, 2024
| Candidate | Votes | Percentage | Actual delegate count | | |
| Candidate | Votes | Percentage | Bound | Unbound | Total |
|---|---|---|---|---|---|
| Donald Trump | 479,556 | 80.50% | 64 | 0 | 64 |
| Nikki Haley (withdrawn) | 86,278 | 14.48% | 0 | 0 | 0 |
| Ron DeSantis (withdrawn) | 16,990 | 2.85% | 0 | 0 | 0 |
| Chris Christie (withdrawn) | 9,758 | 1.64% | 0 | 0 | 0 |
| Ryan Binkley (withdrawn) | 3,114 | 0.52% | 0 | 0 | 0 |
| Total: | 595,696 | 100.00% | 64 | 0 | 64 |

=== Green ===
2024 Illinois Green Party presidential primary
- March 2–16, 2024

Green National Convention delegates
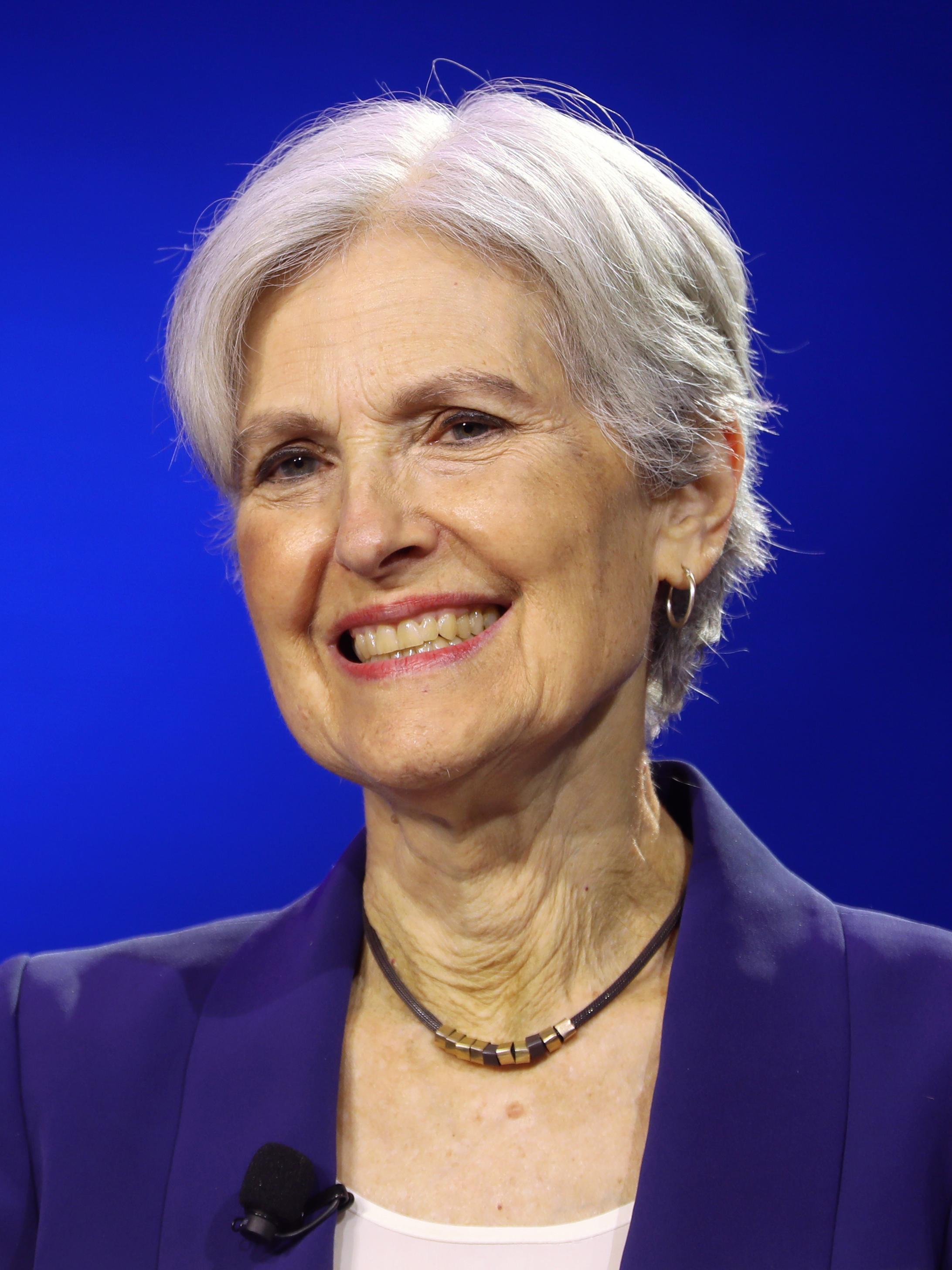
| Candidate | Jill Stein |
| Party | Green |
| Home state | Massachusetts |

The 2024 Illinois Green Party presidential primary was held from March 2 to March 16, 2024, in the U.S. state of Illinois as one of the Green Party's state primaries ahead of the 2024 presidential election. It was run by the Green Party of Illinois. It was an online vote, limited to dues-paying state party members.

== General election ==
=== Candidates ===
On August 23, 2024, the Illinois State Board of Elections met in Chicago and Springfield to certify the following list of candidates to appear on the general election ballot:

- Kamala Harris / Tim Walz — Democratic
- Donald Trump / JD Vance — Republican
- Robert F. Kennedy Jr. / Nicole Shanahan — Independent

The board also issued rulings to the nomination papers of third party and independent candidates, including placeholder candidates for the Libertarian and Green Party tickets, as well as for Kennedy and Shanahan. Both the Libertarian and Green tickets were removed from the ballot, lacking the minimum required number of 25,000 valid signatures, while Kennedy remained.

=== Campaign ===
==== Convention ====
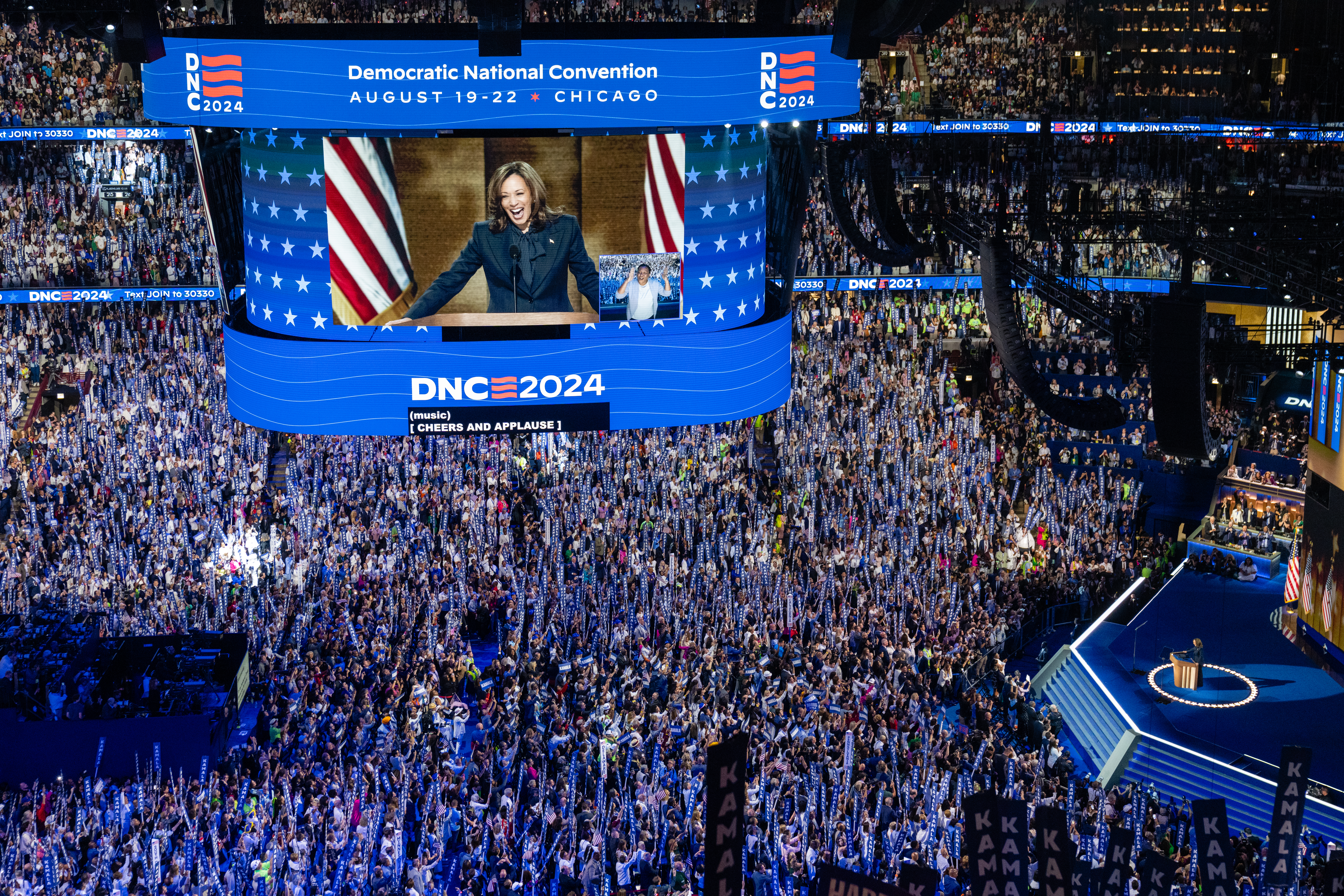
Harris delivering her acceptance speech on the final day of the Democratic National Convention.

The 2024 Democratic National Convention was held from August 19 to 22, 2024, at the United Center in Chicago. It was the first instance of a major party's presidential nominating convention held in Illinois since 1996. Here, party delegates voted on their platform for the election and formally nominated vice president Kamala Harris as the Democratic nominee, with Minnesota governor Tim Walz as her running mate.

=== Predictions ===
| Source | Ranking | As of |
|---|---|---|
| Cook Political Report | Solid D | December 19, 2023 |
| Inside Elections | Solid D | April 26, 2023 |
| Sabato's Crystal Ball | Safe D | June 29, 2023 |
| Decision Desk HQ/The Hill | Safe D | June 13, 2024 |
| CNalysis | Solid D | December 30, 2023 |
| CNN | Solid D | January 14, 2024 |
| The Economist | Likely D | August 23, 2024 |
| 538 | Solid D | October 2, 2024 |
| RCP | Likely D | June 26, 2024 |
| NBC News | Safe D | October 6, 2024 |

=== Polling ===
Kamala Harris vs. Donald Trump

| Poll source | Date(s) administered | Sample size (Note: Key: A – all adults RV – registered voters LV – likely voters V – unclear) | Margin of error | Kamala Harris Democratic | Donald Trump Republican | Other / Undecided |
|---|---|---|---|---|---|---|
| ActiVote | October 4–28, 2024 | 400 (LV) | ± 4.9% | 58% | 42% | – |
| ActiVote | September 3 – October 5, 2024 | 400 (LV) | ± 4.9% | 59% | 41% | – |
| ActiVote | August 6–29, 2024 | 400 (LV) | ± 4.9% | 58% | 42% | – |

Hypothetical polling with Joe Biden and Donald Trump

Joe Biden vs. Donald Trump

| Poll source | Date(s) administered | Sample size | Margin of error | Joe Biden Democratic | Donald Trump Republican | Other / Undecided |
|---|---|---|---|---|---|---|
| John Zogby Strategies (Note: Poll conducted for Kennedy's campaign) | April 13–21, 2024 | 643 (LV) | – | 53% | 40% | 7% |
| Emerson College | October 1–4, 2023 | 468 (RV) | ± 4.5% | 43% | 34% | 23% |
| Cor Strategies | August 24–27, 2023 | 811 (RV) | – | 55% | 35% | 10% |
| Emerson College (Note: Poll sponsored by WGN-TV) | October 20–24, 2022 | 1,000 (LV) | ± 3.0% | 49% | 37% | 14% |
| Public Policy Polling (D) (Note: Poll sponsored by WBEZ & The Chicago Sun-Times) | October 10–11, 2022 | 770 (LV) | ± 3.5% | 51% | 42% | 7% |
| Emerson College | September 21–23, 2022 | 1,000 (LV) | ± 3.0% | 51% | 38% | 11% |

Hypothetical polling with other candidates

Joe Biden vs. Robert F. Kennedy Jr.

| Poll source | Date(s) administered | Sample size | Margin of error | Joe Biden Democratic | Robert F. Kennedy Jr. Independent | Other / Undecided |
|---|---|---|---|---|---|---|
| John Zogby Strategies | April 13–21, 2024 | 643 (LV) | – | 46% | 43% | 11% |

Robert F. Kennedy Jr. vs. Donald Trump

| Poll source | Date(s) administered | Sample size | Margin of error | Robert F. Kennedy Jr. Independent | Donald Trump Republican | Other / Undecided |
|---|---|---|---|---|---|---|
| John Zogby Strategies | April 13–21, 2024 | 643 (LV) | – | 48% | 37% | 15% |

J. B. Pritzker vs. Donald Trump

| Poll source | Date(s) administered | Sample size | Margin of error | J. B. Pritzker Democratic | Donald Trump Republican | Other / Undecided |
|---|---|---|---|---|---|---|
| Public Policy Polling (D) | October 10–11, 2022 | 770 (LV) | ± 3.5% | 51% | 42% | 7% |

Joe Biden vs. Ron DeSantis

| Poll source | Date(s) administered | Sample size | Margin of error | Joe Biden Democratic | Ron DeSantis Republican | Other / Undecided |
|---|---|---|---|---|---|---|
| Cor Strategies | August 24–27, 2023 | 811 (RV) | – | 53% | 35% | 12% |

=== Results ===
Results by State House district: Trump 40–50% 50–60% 60–70% 70–80% / Harris 40–50% 50–60% 60–70% 70–80% 80–90%

2024 United States presidential election in Illinois
| Party | Candidate | Votes | % | ±% |
|---|---|---|---|---|
| Democratic | Kamala Harris; Tim Walz | 3,062,863 | 54.37% | ▼3.17% |
| Republican | Donald Trump; JD Vance | 2,449,079 | 43.47% | ▲2.92% |
| Independent | Robert F. Kennedy Jr.; Nicole Shanahan | 80,426 | 1.43% | N/A |
| Green (Write-in) | Jill Stein; Butch Ware | 31,023 | 0.55% | ▲0.04% |
| Libertarian (Write-in) | Chase Oliver; Mike ter Maat | 3,510 | 0.06% | ▼1.04% |
| Socialism and Liberation (Write-in) | Claudia De la Cruz; Karina Garcia | 2,877 | 0.05% | ▼0.07% |
| Independent (Write-in) | Cornel West; Melina Abdullah | 1,569 | 0.03% | N/A |
| American Solidarity (Write-in) | Peter Sonski; Lauren Onak | 1,391 | 0.02% | ▼0.13% |
| All other write-ins | Various | 572 | 0.01% | N/A |
| Total votes | | 5,633,310 | 100.00% | N/A |

==== By county ====
Results in the Chicago area: Harris 40–50% 50–60% 60–70% 70–80% 80–90% >90% / Trump 50–60% 60–70%

| County | Kamala Harris Democratic | | Donald Trump Republican | | Various candidates Other parties | | Margin | | Total votes cast |
| County | # | % | # | % | # | % | # | % | Total votes cast |
|---|---|---|---|---|---|---|---|---|---|
| Adams | 8,111 | 25.43% | 23,161 | 72.61% | 628 | 1.96% | −15,050 | −47.18% | 31,900 |
| Alexander | 904 | 39.72% | 1,341 | 58.92% | 31 | 1.36% | −437 | −19.20% | 2,276 |
| Bond | 2,117 | 26.41% | 5,692 | 71.01% | 207 | 2.58% | −3,575 | −44.60% | 8,016 |
| Boone | 10,159 | 41.71% | 13,673 | 56.14% | 525 | 2.15% | −3,514 | −14.43% | 24,357 |
| Brown | 467 | 18.95% | 1,938 | 78.62% | 60 | 2.43% | −1,471 | −59.67% | 2,465 |
| Bureau | 5,900 | 36.71% | 9,784 | 60.88% | 387 | 2.41% | −3,884 | −24.17% | 16,071 |
| Calhoun | 560 | 20.86% | 2,059 | 76.71% | 65 | 2.43% | −1,499 | −55.85% | 2,684 |
| Carroll | 2,600 | 33.09% | 5,082 | 64.68% | 175 | 2.23% | −2,482 | −31.59% | 7,857 |
| Cass | 1,438 | 27.44% | 3,712 | 70.83% | 91 | 1.73% | −2,274 | −43.39% | 5,241 |
| Champaign | 54,314 | 60.18% | 32,965 | 36.52% | 2,977 | 3.30% | 21,349 | 23.66% | 90,256 |
| Christian | 4,026 | 25.81% | 11,278 | 72.29% | 296 | 1.90% | −7,252 | −46.48% | 15,600 |
| Clark | 1,927 | 23.42% | 6,130 | 74.50% | 171 | 2.08% | −4,203 | −51.08% | 8,228 |
| Clay | 1,054 | 15.55% | 5,610 | 82.77% | 114 | 1.68% | −4,556 | −67.22% | 6,778 |
| Clinton | 4,447 | 23.03% | 14,407 | 74.62% | 452 | 2.35% | −9,960 | −51.59% | 19,306 |
| Coles | 7,495 | 34.68% | 13,606 | 62.95% | 512 | 2.37% | −6,111 | −28.27% | 21,613 |
| Cook | 1,447,821 | 69.63% | 583,852 | 28.08% | 47,566 | 2.29% | 863,969 | 42.00% | 2,079,239 |
| Crawford | 2,048 | 22.87% | 6,727 | 75.13% | 179 | 2.00% | −4,679 | −52.26% | 8,954 |
| Cumberland | 1,059 | 18.28% | 4,627 | 79.89% | 106 | 1.83% | −3,568 | −61.61% | 5,792 |
| DeKalb | 23,648 | 50.12% | 22,716 | 48.14% | 822 | 1.74% | 932 | 1.98% | 47,186 |
| DeWitt | 2,058 | 26.49% | 5,529 | 71.18% | 181 | 2.33% | −3,471 | −44.69% | 7,768 |
| Douglas | 2,198 | 26.02% | 6,076 | 71.92% | 174 | 2.06% | −3,878 | −45.90% | 8,448 |
| DuPage | 251,164 | 55.86% | 191,243 | 42.53% | 7,253 | 1.61% | 59,921 | 13.33% | 449,660 |
| Edgar | 1,816 | 22.91% | 5,955 | 75.11% | 157 | 1.98% | −4,139 | −52.20% | 7,928 |
| Edwards | 457 | 13.87% | 2,794 | 84.80% | 44 | 1.33% | −2,337 | −70.93% | 3,295 |
| Effingham | 3,617 | 18.88% | 15,124 | 78.96% | 413 | 2.16% | −11,507 | −60.08% | 19,154 |
| Fayette | 1,632 | 16.95% | 7,847 | 81.52% | 147 | 1.53% | −6,215 | −64.57% | 9,626 |
| Ford | 1,643 | 24.99% | 4,778 | 72.67% | 154 | 2.34% | −3,135 | −47.68% | 6,575 |
| Franklin | 4,257 | 24.00% | 13,200 | 74.41% | 282 | 1.59% | −8,943 | −50.41% | 17,739 |
| Fulton | 5,980 | 36.89% | 9,827 | 60.62% | 405 | 2.49% | −3,847 | −23.73% | 16,212 |
| Gallatin | 561 | 22.13% | 1,923 | 75.86% | 51 | 2.01% | −1,362 | −53.73% | 2,535 |
| Greene | 1,220 | 20.08% | 4,719 | 77.68% | 136 | 2.24% | −3,499 | −57.60% | 6,075 |
| Grundy | 9,143 | 34.28% | 16,997 | 63.74% | 528 | 1.98% | −7,854 | −29.46% | 26,668 |
| Hamilton | 739 | 17.62% | 3,385 | 80.71% | 70 | 1.67% | −2,646 | −63.09% | 4,194 |
| Hancock | 2,183 | 23.97% | 6,708 | 73.67% | 215 | 2.36% | −4,525 | −49.70% | 9,106 |
| Hardin | 357 | 18.47% | 1,546 | 79.98% | 30 | 1.55% | −1,189 | −61.51% | 1,933 |
| Henderson | 1,026 | 29.57% | 2,369 | 68.27% | 75 | 2.16% | −1,343 | −38.70% | 3,470 |
| Henry | 9,226 | 36.64% | 15,359 | 60.99% | 596 | 2.37% | −6,133 | −24.35% | 25,181 |
| Iroquois | 2,747 | 20.57% | 10,376 | 77.70% | 231 | 1.73% | −7,629 | −57.13% | 13,354 |
| Jackson | 11,394 | 50.46% | 10,614 | 47.00% | 574 | 2.54% | 780 | 3.46% | 22,582 |
| Jasper | 912 | 16.77% | 4,449 | 81.81% | 77 | 1.42% | −3,537 | −65.04% | 5,438 |
| Jefferson | 4,240 | 25.38% | 12,189 | 72.97% | 275 | 1.65% | −7,949 | −47.59% | 16,704 |
| Jersey | 2,816 | 23.98% | 8,684 | 73.95% | 243 | 2.07% | −5,868 | −49.97% | 11,743 |
| Jo Daviess | 5,051 | 40.50% | 7,136 | 57.22% | 285 | 2.28% | −2,085 | −16.72% | 12,472 |
| Johnson | 1,241 | 20.33% | 4,798 | 78.62% | 64 | 1.05% | −3,557 | −58.29% | 6,103 |
| Kane | 120,077 | 54.00% | 99,260 | 44.64% | 3,027 | 1.36% | 20,817 | 9.36% | 222,364 |
| Kankakee | 18,399 | 38.50% | 28,285 | 59.19% | 1,101 | 2.31% | −9,886 | −20.69% | 47,785 |
| Kendall | 32,977 | 49.99% | 31,970 | 48.46% | 1,023 | 1.55% | 1,007 | 1.53% | 65,970 |
| Knox | 9,838 | 44.13% | 11,917 | 53.45% | 540 | 2.42% | -2,079 | −9.32% | 22,295 |
| Lake | 184,642 | 58.89% | 120,402 | 38.40% | 8,514 | 2.71% | 64,240 | 20.49% | 313,558 |
| LaSalle | 21,029 | 39.91% | 30,717 | 58.30% | 942 | 1.79% | −9,688 | −18.39% | 52,688 |
| Lawrence | 1,283 | 20.94% | 4,715 | 76.97% | 128 | 2.09% | −3,432 | −56.03% | 6,126 |
| Lee | 6,105 | 37.75% | 9,680 | 59.86% | 387 | 2.39% | −3,575 | −22.11% | 16,172 |
| Livingston | 4,311 | 25.94% | 11,970 | 72.02% | 340 | 2.04% | −7,659 | −46.08% | 16,621 |
| Logan | 3,543 | 28.07% | 8,757 | 69.38% | 321 | 2.55% | −5,214 | −41.31% | 12,621 |
| Macon | 18,009 | 39.57% | 26,562 | 58.37% | 938 | 2.06% | −8,553 | −18.80% | 45,509 |
| Macoupin | 6,892 | 29.32% | 16,065 | 68.35% | 546 | 2.32% | −9,173 | −39.03% | 23,503 |
| Madison | 56,341 | 42.18% | 73,925 | 55.34% | 3,317 | 2.48% | −17,584 | −13.16% | 133,583 |
| Marion | 4,116 | 24.50% | 12,409 | 73.85% | 278 | 1.65% | −8,293 | −49.35% | 16,803 |
| Marshall | 1,913 | 31.09% | 4,119 | 66.93% | 122 | 1.98% | −2,206 | −35.84% | 6,154 |
| Mason | 1,773 | 27.69% | 4,464 | 69.73% | 165 | 2.58% | −2,691 | −42.04% | 6,402 |
| Massac | 1,683 | 25.11% | 4,939 | 73.68% | 81 | 1.21% | −3,256 | −48.57% | 6,703 |
| McDonough | 4,736 | 39.38% | 6,987 | 58.10% | 302 | 2.52% | −2,251 | −18.72% | 12,025 |
| McHenry | 75,370 | 46.22% | 83,933 | 51.47% | 3,779 | 2.31% | −8,563 | −5.25% | 163,082 |
| McLean | 44,495 | 51.08% | 40,290 | 46.25% | 2,330 | 2.67% | 4,205 | 4.83% | 87,115 |
| Menard | 1,834 | 28.41% | 4,499 | 69.69% | 123 | 1.90% | −2,665 | −41.28% | 6,456 |
| Mercer | 2,950 | 35.23% | 5,215 | 62.28% | 208 | 2.49% | −2,265 | −27.05% | 8,373 |
| Monroe | 6,473 | 30.80% | 14,055 | 66.88% | 486 | 2.32% | −7,582 | −36.08% | 21,014 |
| Montgomery | 3,573 | 26.97% | 9,378 | 70.80% | 295 | 2.23% | −5,805 | −43.83% | 13,246 |
| Morgan | 4,848 | 33.03% | 9,607 | 65.46% | 222 | 1.51% | −4,759 | −32.43% | 14,677 |
| Moultrie | 1,615 | 24.67% | 4,816 | 73.56% | 116 | 1.77% | −3,201 | −48.89% | 6,547 |
| Ogle | 8,883 | 34.30% | 16,450 | 63.51% | 567 | 2.19% | −7,567 | −29.21% | 25,900 |
| Peoria | 40,564 | 50.88% | 36,896 | 46.28% | 2,262 | 2.84% | 3,668 | 4.60% | 79,722 |
| Perry | 2,146 | 23.16% | 6,949 | 75.00% | 170 | 1.84% | −4,803 | −51.84% | 9,265 |
| Piatt | 3,204 | 33.56% | 6,104 | 63.94% | 238 | 2.50% | −2,900 | −30.38% | 9,546 |
| Pike | 1,302 | 17.30% | 6,086 | 80.88% | 137 | 1.82% | −4,784 | −63.58% | 7,525 |
| Pope | 416 | 19.48% | 1,698 | 79.53% | 21 | 0.99% | −1,282 | −60.05% | 2,135 |
| Pulaski | 769 | 32.23% | 1,583 | 66.35% | 34 | 1.42% | −814 | −34.12% | 2,386 |
| Putnam | 1,254 | 37.46% | 2,014 | 60.16% | 80 | 2.38% | −760 | −22.70% | 3,348 |
| Randolph | 3,461 | 24.08% | 10,624 | 73.92% | 288 | 2.00% | −7,163 | −49.84% | 14,373 |
| Richland | 1,747 | 22.48% | 5,889 | 75.77% | 136 | 1.75% | −4,142 | −53.29% | 7,772 |
| Rock Island | 34,126 | 53.59% | 28,061 | 44.07% | 1,492 | 2.34% | 6,065 | 9.52% | 63,679 |
| Saline | 2,634 | 24.78% | 7,830 | 73.67% | 165 | 1.55% | −5,196 | −48.89% | 10,629 |
| Sangamon | 46,074 | 46.18% | 50,979 | 51.09% | 2,720 | 2.73% | −4,905 | −4.91% | 99,773 |
| Schuyler | 961 | 25.51% | 2,720 | 72.21% | 86 | 2.28% | −1,759 | −46.70% | 3,767 |
| Scott | 488 | 18.83% | 2,071 | 79.90% | 33 | 1.27% | −1,583 | −61.07% | 2,592 |
| Shelby | 2,240 | 19.14% | 9,267 | 79.18% | 196 | 1.68% | −7,027 | −60.04% | 11,703 |
| St. Clair | 63,433 | 52.61% | 54,021 | 44.80% | 3,118 | 2.59% | 9,412 | 7.81% | 120,572 |
| Stark | 725 | 26.22% | 1,983 | 71.72% | 57 | 2.06% | −1,258 | −45.50% | 2,765 |
| Stephenson | 8,278 | 39.28% | 12,347 | 58.58% | 451 | 2.14% | −4,069 | −19.30% | 21,076 |
| Tazewell | 24,325 | 35.54% | 42,451 | 62.02% | 1,666 | 2.44% | −18,126 | −26.48% | 68,442 |
| Union | 2,285 | 27.64% | 5,837 | 70.60% | 146 | 1.76% | −3,552 | −42.96% | 8,268 |
| Vermilion | 9,254 | 31.21% | 19,777 | 66.70% | 620 | 2.09% | −10,523 | −35.49% | 29,651 |
| Wabash | 1,200 | 22.25% | 4,095 | 75.93% | 98 | 1.82% | −2,895 | −53.68% | 5,393 |
| Warren | 2,711 | 36.29% | 4,579 | 61.30% | 180 | 2.41% | −1,868 | −25.01% | 7,470 |
| Washington | 1,564 | 20.59% | 5,892 | 77.56% | 141 | 1.85% | −4,328 | −56.97% | 7,597 |
| Wayne | 1,155 | 13.93% | 7,019 | 84.66% | 117 | 1.41% | −5,864 | −70.73% | 8,291 |
| White | 1,390 | 19.62% | 5,586 | 78.84% | 109 | 1.54% | −4,196 | −59.22% | 7,085 |
| Whiteside | 11,012 | 41.48% | 14,898 | 56.11% | 640 | 2.41% | −3,886 | −14.63% | 26,550 |
| Will | 162,874 | 50.10% | 157,672 | 48.50% | 4,425 | 1.40% | 5,202 | 1.60% | 328,937 |
| Williamson | 9,890 | 29.81% | 22,686 | 68.38% | 598 | 1.81% | −12,796 | −38.57% | 33,174 |
| Winnebago | 59,942 | 49.13% | 59,257 | 48.56% | 2,819 | 2.31% | 685 | 0.57% | 122,018 |
| Woodford | 5,958 | 28.03% | 14,837 | 69.79% | 463 | 2.18% | −8,879 | −41.76% | 21,258 |
| Totals | 3,062,863 | 54.37% | 2,449,079 | 43.47% | 121,928 | 2.16% | 613,784 | 10.89% | 5,633,870 |

==== By congressional district ====
Harris won 14 of 17 congressional districts.

| District | Harris | Trump | Representative |
|---|---|---|---|
| 1st | 65% | 33% | Jonathan Jackson |
| 2nd | 66% | 33% | Robin Kelly |
| 3rd | 64% | 33% | Delia Ramirez |
| 4th | 63% | 35% | Chuy García |
| 5th | 67% | 31% | Mike Quigley |
| 6th | 51% | 45% | Sean Casten |
| 7th | 81% | 17% | Danny Davis |
| 8th | 52% | 45% | Raja Krishnamoorthi |
| 9th | 67% | 31% | Jan Schakowsky |
| 10th | 60% | 38% | Brad Schneider |
| 11th | 54% | 43% | Bill Foster |
| 12th | 27% | 71% | Mike Bost |
| 13th | 54% | 43% | Nikki Budzinski |
| 14th | 51% | 46% | Lauren Underwood |
| 15th | 29% | 69% | Mary Miller |
| 16th | 38% | 60% | Darin LaHood |
| 17th | 51% | 46% | Eric Sorensen |

== Analysis ==
The 2024 presidential election resulted in Kamala Harris carrying the state of Illinois, a historic Democratic stronghold in the Midwest. Illinois has not been won by a Republican candidate at the presidential level since 1988 as a result of most of the population being concentrated in the Chicago metropolitan area. However, Illinois took a massive 6.1% shift towards the right from 2020. This rightward shift was a result of Republicans making ground in the highly populated collar counties combined with low voter turn-out for Democrats in Cook County, home of Chicago.

Despite Illinois shifting rightward, Harris became the first Democratic nominee to win over 60% of the vote in Champaign County, Illinois (home to the University of Illinois Urbana-Champaign). Harris also won McLean County (home to Illinois State University) despite losing the presidential election. Both counties shifted slightly leftward, highlighting Harris's gains among White women with college degrees, who according to exit polls voted for Harris by a margin of 58-41%.

Illinois's shift represents broader trends across the country with Donald Trump making improvements with key-demographics, such as Hispanics. Donald Trump's improvement among most demographics can be attributed to people's concern regarding the state of the economy and the inflation rate.

== See also ==
- United States presidential elections in Illinois
- 2024 United States presidential election
- 2024 Democratic Party presidential primaries
- 2024 Republican Party presidential primaries
- 2024 United States elections

== Notes ==
Partisan clients
