= 2024 United States presidential election in Ohio =

- November 5, 2024
- Turnout: 71.71% (▼2.28 pp)

Nominee	Donald Trump	Kamala Harris
Party	Republican	Democratic
Home state	Florida	California
Running mate	JD Vance	Tim Walz
Electoral vote	17	0
Popular vote	3,180,116	2,533,699
Percentage	55.14%	43.93%

Trump
40–50%
50–60%
60–70%
70–80%
80–90%
90–100%
Harris
40–50%
50–60%
60–70%
70–80%
80–90%
90–100%
Tie/No data
President before election
Joe Biden
Democratic
Elected President
Donald Trump
Republican

The 2024 United States presidential election in Ohio was held on Tuesday, November 5, 2024, as part of the 2024 United States presidential election in which all 50 states plus the District of Columbia participated. Ohio voters chose electors to represent them in the Electoral College via a popular vote. Ohio had 17 electoral votes in the Electoral College, following reapportionment due to the 2020 United States census in which the state lost a seat.

Republican Donald Trump ultimately won Ohio for the third straight election, defeating Democrat Kamala Harris by 11.21%, the widest presidential margin of victory in the state since fellow Republican Ronald Reagan's 18.76% in 1984. Trump became the third presidential candidate to carry Ohio three times, following Franklin D. Roosevelt (the only previous candidate with three consecutive victories here) and Richard Nixon. Prior to the election, all major news organizations considered Ohio a state Trump would once again win, or a likely red state. A former bellwether and swing state, Ohio has not voted for a Democratic nominee for president since Barack Obama in 2012. No Republican has ever won the presidency without winning Ohio. Since 2012, Ohio has been trending towards the GOP. The state is currently moderately to strongly Republican. Trump's 2024 statewide victory was the first double-digit win at the presidential level for Ohio since Republican George H. W. Bush's 10.85% in 1988. Ohio was the home state of Trump's running mate JD Vance.

The election was held concurrently with a U.S. Senate race in Ohio, in which Republican nominee Bernie Moreno unseated Democratic incumbent Sherrod Brown, which was partly credited to Trump's overall success in the state. Additionally, an attempt to establish a redistricting commission (with the goal of ending gerrymandering) was proposed on the state's ballot but was defeated. Trump's denouncement of this is also perceived as having had an influence on this, amongst a number of other factors.

== Primary elections ==
=== Democratic primary ===
The Ohio Democratic primary was held on March 19, 2024, alongside the Arizona, Illinois, and Kansas primaries.

2024 Ohio Democratic pres. primary
Candidate	Votes	%	Delegates
Joe Biden (incumbent)	461,558	87.06	124
Dean Phillips (withdrawn)	68,629	12.94	3
Total	530,187	100%	127

President Joe Biden won every county and 87.06% of the vote, but, despite having already dropped out, U.S. Representative Dean Phillips won three delegates. Congressman Phillips was still on the ballot on election day, and gained his delegates by meeting the 15% threshold of votes needed to receive a delegate in a congressional district in the state's 2nd, 6th, and 14th districts.

=== Republican primary ===
The Ohio Republican primary was held on March 19, 2024, alongside primaries in Arizona, Florida, and Illinois.

Ohio Republican primary, March 19, 2024
Candidate	Votes	Percentage	Actual delegate count		
Candidate	Votes	Percentage	Bound	Unbound	Total
Donald Trump	896,059	79.21%	79		79
Nikki Haley (withdrawn)	162,563	14.37%			
Ron DeSantis (withdrawn)	38,089	3.37%			
Chris Christie (withdrawn)	20,027	1.77%			
Vivek Ramaswamy (withdrawn)	14,450	1.28%			
Total:	1,131,188	100.00%	79		79

== General election ==
=== Predictions ===
Source	Ranking	As of
Cook Political Report	Solid R	December 19, 2023
Inside Elections	Likely R	April 26, 2023
Sabato's Crystal Ball	Safe R	June 13, 2024
Decision Desk HQ/The Hill	Likely R	December 14, 2023
CNalysis	Likely R	November 4, 2024
CNN	Solid R	January 14, 2024
The Economist	Safe R	November 1, 2024
538	Likely R	June 11, 2024
NBC News	Safe R	October 6, 2024
YouGov	Safe R	November 1, 2024
Split Ticket	Likely R	November 1, 2024

=== Democratic ballot access controversy ===
Due to the Democratic National Convention taking place on August 19, 2024, which occurred more than a week after the August 7 deadline to certify a presidential candidate for office, under ordinary rules, the eventual Democratic nominee would be disqualified from the ballot. Efforts to create an emergency fix had stalled in the Ohio Legislature. The state House adjourned without considering a fix on May 8. On May 21, Ohio Secretary of State Frank LaRose provided an update confirming that efforts to rectify the situation were at an impasse, as the state legislature would not take up the issue and the Ohio Democratic Party had offered no "legally acceptable remedy" up to that point. He further clarified that if the party did not work toward a solution themselves, their presidential nominee would not be listed on the November ballot.

On May 23, Governor Mike DeWine called for a special legislative session and tasked lawmakers with ensuring Biden's inclusion on the ballot. Republican leaders in the state senate, with DeWine's support, hoped to pass a bill that will tie solving the ballot access issue to a ban on foreign contributions toward ballot measure efforts in the state. Ohio Democratic Party chair Elizabeth Walters and state House minority leader Allison Russo had signaled their opposition to the ban, which was described as a poison pill amendment; a spokesperson for DeWine later said that a bill dealing only with the ballot access issue could also be considered.

After the state legislature appeared to be unable to address the issue, the Democratic Party announced on May 28 that a virtual roll call nomination, similar to the process used by the party in 2020, would take place two weeks before the 2024 Democratic National Convention to nominate Biden and meet Ohio's deadline. Nonetheless, the Ohio legislature passed a bill on June 1 extending the deadline to August 23, which DeWine signed on June 2. However, because the law did not take effect until September 1, Democrats continued with the roll call to meet the original deadline.

=== Green Party ballot access controversy ===
Green Party nominee Jill Stein also appeared on the ballot, though votes for her did not count, due to her nominating a running mate after the state deadline. Citing the law that allowed Joe Biden to be nominated, the Green Party attempted to use this exact ruling in their favor to swap VP candidates. However, VP candidate Anita Rios testified in federal court that she had not signed the withdraw form, and that someone unknown to the Stein campaign had submitted a forgery of her signature. The Green Party argued that the Secretary of State should never have accepted the withdraw letter, saying the signature of Rios was a PDF copy from her 2014 governorship candidacy paperwork. The Stein campaign stated that a letter to the Ohio Secretary of State requesting removal from the ballot was "fraudulent".

A hearing to restore ballot access for Stein was scheduled for October 22, in which the federal courts abstained from making a ruling on the case. The Stein campaign and the Ohio Green Party announced that they would continue the lawsuit to make the votes for Stein-Rios in Ohio count. The court, however, ruled the withdraw of the candidate as legitimate and the Secretary of State ordered county Board of Elections to no count any vote for Stein.

=== Polling ===
Donald Trump vs. Kamala Harris

Aggregate polls

Source of poll aggregation	Dates administered	Dates updated	Kamala Harris Democratic	Donald Trump Republican	Other / Undecided (Note: Calculated by taking the difference of 100% and all other candidates combined.)	Margin
270ToWin	October 22 – November 4, 2024	November 4, 2024	44.3%	52.0%	3.7%	Trump +7.7%
538	through November 4, 2024	November 4, 2024	43.4%	52.3%	4.3%	Trump +8.8%
The Hill/DDHQ	through November 3, 2024	November 3, 2024	44.6%	52.2%	3.2%	Trump +7.6%
Average			44.1%	52.2%	3.7%	Trump +8.1%

Poll source	Date(s) administered	Sample size (Note: Key: A – all adults RV – registered voters LV – likely voters V – unclear)	Margin of error	Donald Trump Republican	Kamala Harris Democratic	Other / Undecided
AtlasIntel	November 3–4, 2024	1,022 (LV)	± 3.0%	54%	45%	1%
Trafalgar Group (R)	November 2–4, 2024	1,095 (LV)	± 2.9%	52%	45%	3% (Note: "Other" with 2%)
Emerson College (Note: Poll sponsored by The Hill)	October 30 − November 2, 2024	900 (LV)	± 3.2%	54%	42%	4% (Note: "Someone else" with 2%)
Emerson College	October 30 − November 2, 2024	900 (LV)	± 3.2%	54.7% (Note: With voters who lean towards a given candidate)	43.5%	1.9%
Morning Consult	October 23 − November 1, 2024	1,254 (LV)	± 3.0%	53%	44%	3%
Trafalgar Group (R) (Note: Poll sponsored by Ohio Press Network)	October 25–28, 2024	1,127 (LV)	± 2.9%	52%	46%	2% (Note: "Other" with 1%)
ActiVote	October 5−28, 2024	400 (LV)	± 4.9%	54%	46%	–
CES/YouGov	October 1–25, 2024	3,120 (A)	–	52%	45%	3%
CES/YouGov	October 1–25, 2024	3,091 (LV)	–	52%	45%	3%
J.L. Partners	October 22−24, 2024	997 (LV)	± 3.1%	53%	44%	3%
University of Akron	September 12 – October 24, 2024	1,241 (RV)	± 2.8%	51%	44%	5%
Bowling Green State University/YouGov	October 10−21, 2024	1,000 (LV)	± 3.6%	50%	43%	5% (Note: "Some other candidate" with 2%)
Morning Consult	October 6−15, 2024	1,243 (LV)	± 3.0%	52%	45%	3%
Rasmussen Reports (R) (Note: Poll sponsored by American Thinker)	October 9−14, 2024	1,051 (LV)	± 3.0%	51%	44%	5%
Washington Post	October 3–7, 2024	1,002 (RV)	± 3.5%	51%	44%	5% (Note: "Someone else" & "Would not vote" with 1% each)
Washington Post	October 3–7, 2024	1,002 (LV)	± 3.5%	51%	45%	4% (Note: "Someone else" with 1%)
Marist College	October 3–7, 2024	1,511 (RV)	± 3.0%	52%	46%	2% (Note: "Another party's candidates" with 1%)
Marist College	October 3–7, 2024	1,327 (LV)	± 3.2%	52%	46%	2%
ActiVote	August 28 – September 30, 2024	400 (LV)	± 4.9%	54%	46%	–
Bowling Green State University/YouGov	September 18–27, 2024	1,000 (LV)	± 3.6%	51%	44%	5% (Note: "Some other candidate" with 1%)
New York Times/Siena College	September 21–26, 2024	687 (RV)	± 4.0%	49%	45%	6%
New York Times/Siena College	September 21–26, 2024	687 (LV)	± 4.0%	50%	44%	6%
RMG Research (Note: Poll sponsored by the Napolitan Institute)	September 18−20, 2024	757 (LV)	± 3.5%	54%	43%	3% (Note: "Some other candidate" with 2%; "Would not vote" with 1%)
Morning Consult	September 9−18, 2024	1,488 (LV)	± 3.0%	52%	43%	5%
Morning Consult	August 30 – September 8, 2024	1,558 (LV)	± 3.0%	52%	44%	4%
Emerson College	September 3–5, 2024	945 (LV)	± 3.1%	53%	43%	4%
Emerson College	September 3–5, 2024	945 (LV)	± 3.1%	54% (Note: With voters who lean towards a given candidate)	45%	1%
SoCal Strategies (R) (Note: Poll sponsored by On Point Politics & Red Eagle Politics)	August 31 – September 1, 2024	600 (LV)	–	52%	43%	5%
	August 23, 2024	Robert F. Kennedy Jr. suspends his presidential campaign and endorses Donald Trump.				
ActiVote	August 2–22, 2024	400 (LV)	± 4.9%	56%	44%	–
	August 19–22, 2024	Democratic National Convention				
Rasmussen Reports (R) (Note: Poll sponsored by NumbersUSA)	August 13–17, 2024	1,267 (LV)	–	51%	44%	5%
	August 6, 2024	Kamala Harris selects Gov. Tim Walz as her running mate.				
Fabrizio Ward (R)/Impact Research (D) (Note: Poll commissioned by AARP)	July 23–28, 2024	600 (LV)	± 4.0%	52%	42%	6%
	July 21, 2024	Joe Biden announces his withdrawal from the race; Kamala Harris declares her candidacy for president.				
	July 15–19, 2024	Republican National Convention				
	July 13, 2024	attempted assassination of Donald Trump				
Ohio Northern University	March 6–11, 2024	1,241 (LV)	± 3.3%	51%	38%	11%

Donald Trump vs. Kamala Harris vs. Cornel West vs. Jill Stein vs. Chase Oliver

Poll source	Date(s) administered	Sample size	Margin of error	Donald Trump Republican	Kamala Harris Democratic	Cornel West Independent	Jill Stein Green	Chase Oliver Libertarian	Other / Undecided
AtlasIntel	November 3–4, 2024	1,022 (LV)	± 3.0%	54%	45%	–	1%	0%	–
Focaldata	October 3 – November 1, 2024	2,161 (LV)	–	53%	44%	–	0%	1%	2%
Focaldata	October 3 – November 1, 2024	1,867 (RV)	± 2.1%	52%	45%	–	0%	2%	1%
Focaldata	October 3 – November 1, 2024	2,161 (A)	–	53%	42%	–	0%	2%	3%
OnMessage Inc. (R) (Note: Poll sponsored by the Senate Opportunity Fund)	October 19–22, 2024	600 (LV)	± 4.0%	52%	44%	–	1%	1%	2%
New York Times/Siena College	September 21–26, 2024	687 (RV)	± 4.0%	47%	44%	–	2%	2%	5%
New York Times/Siena College	September 21–26, 2024	687 (LV)	± 4.0%	49%	43%	–	2%	2%	4%

Hypothetical polling with Robert F. Kennedy Jr.

Donald Trump vs. Kamala Harris vs. Robert F. Kennedy Jr. vs. Cornel West vs. Jill Stein vs. Chase Oliver

Poll source	Date(s) administered	Sample size	Margin of error	Donald Trump Republican	Kamala Harris Democratic	Robert F. Kennedy Jr. Independent	Cornel West Independent	Jill Stein Green	Chase Oliver Libertarian	Other / Undecided
Miami University	October 28–30, 2024	859 (RV)	± 5.0%	49%	46%	0%	–	0%	0%	5%
Miami University	October 28–30, 2024	851 (LV)	± 5.0%	50%	47%	0%	–	0%	0%	3%
Rasmussen Reports (R)	August 13–17, 2024	1,267 (LV)	–	50%	42%	4%	1%	0%	–	3%
Fabrizio Ward (R)/Impact Research (D)	July 23–28, 2024	600 (LV)	± 4.0%	48%	39%	9%	–	1%	1%	2%

Hypothetical polling with Donald Trump and Joe Biden

Donald Trump vs. Joe Biden

Poll source	Date(s) administered	Sample size	Margin of error	Donald Trump Republican	Joe Biden Democratic	Other / Undecided
National Public Affairs	May 28–29, 2024	801 (LV)	± 3.5%	54%	46%	–
John Zogby Strategies (Note: Poll conducted for Kennedy's campaign)	April 13–21, 2024	643 (LV)	–	52%	42%	6%
Mainstreet Research/Florida Atlantic University	March 13–15, 2024	818 (RV)	± 3.4%	51%	40%	9%
Ohio Northern University	March 6–11, 2024	1,241 (LV)	± 3.3%	50%	38%	12%
Emerson College (Note: Poll sponsored by Nexstar Media Group)	March 7–10, 2024	1,300 (RV)	± 2.6%	50%	41%	9%
Emerson College	March 7–10, 2024	1,300 (RV)	± 2.6%	55%	45%	–
Emerson College	January 23–25, 2024	1,844 (RV)	± 2.3%	47%	36%	17% (Note: "Someone else" with 9%)
Emerson College/WJW-TV	November 10–13, 2023	1,000 (RV)	± 3.0%	50%	38%	12%
Data for Progress (D)	October 31 – November 2, 2023	597 (LV)	± 4.0%	51%	43%	6%
Ohio Northern University	October 16–19, 2023	668 (RV)	± 3.8%	45%	40%	15% (Note: "Some other candidate" with 5%)
Emerson College	October 2–4, 2023	438 (RV)	± 4.5%	45%	33%	23%
Change Research (D)/Future Majority (D)	September 16–19, 2023	1,559 (RV)	–	48%	43%	9%
Ohio Northern University	July 17–26, 2023	675 (RV)	± 3.7%	49%	39%	12%
Targoz Market Research	November 2–6, 2022	505 (LV)	± 4.3%	57%	40%	3%
Emerson College	October 30 – November 1, 2022	1,000 (LV)	± 3.0%	50%	38%	12%
Ohio Northern University/Lucid	October 11–15, 2022	668 (LV)	–	55%	35%	10%
Emerson College	October 6–7, 2022	1,000 (LV)	± 3.0%	48%	40%	12%
Emerson College	September 12–13, 2022	1,000 (LV)	± 3.0%	50%	40%	10%
Echelon Insights	August 31 – September 7, 2022	831 (LV)	± 4.3%	49%	41%	10%
Emerson College	August 15–16, 2022	925 (LV)	± 3.2%	53%	39%	8%
PEM Management Corporation (R) (Note: Poll conducted for the John Bolton Super PAC)	July 22–24, 2022	300 (LV)	± 5.7%	42%	44%	14%

Donald Trump vs. Joe Biden vs. Robert F. Kennedy Jr. vs. Cornel West vs. Jill Stein

Poll source	Date(s) administered	Sample size	Margin of error	Donald Trump Republican	Joe Biden Democratic	Robert F. Kennedy Jr. Independent	Cornel West Independent	Jill Stein Green	Other / Undecided
Marist College	June 3–6, 2024	1,137 (RV)	± 3.6%	48%	41%	5%	1%	1%	4%
National Public Affairs	May 28–29, 2024	801 (LV)	± 3.5%	48%	40%	7%	2%	3%	–
East Carolina University	March 8–11, 2024	1,298 (LV)	± 3.2%	48%	38%	5%	1%	1%	7%
Emerson College	March 7–10, 2024	1,300 (RV)	± 2.6%	47%	38%	6%	1%	1%	7%
Emerson College/WJW-TV	November 10–13, 2023	1,000 (RV)	± 3.0%	45%	31%	8%	1%	2%	13%

Donald Trump vs. Joe Biden. vs. Robert F. Kennedy Jr.

Poll source	Date(s) administered	Sample size	Margin of error	Donald Trump Republican	Joe Biden Democratic	Robert F. Kennedy Jr. Independent	Other / Undecided
Ohio Northern University	March 6–11, 2024	1,241 (LV)	± 3.3%	44%	32%	13%	11%
Ohio Northern University	October 16–19, 2023	668 (RV)	± 3.8%	42%	35%	11%	12%

Donald Trump vs. Joe Biden vs. Cornel West

Poll source	Date(s) administered	Sample size	Margin of error	Donald Trump Republican	Joe Biden Democratic	Cornel West Green	Other / Undecided
Change Research (D)/Future Majority (D)	September 16–19, 2023	1,559 (RV)	–	45%	36%	9%	10%
Change Research (D)/Future Majority (D)	September 16–19, 2023	1,559 (RV)	–	42%	34%	6%	18% (Note: Joe Manchin with 6%)
Suffolk University/USA Today	July 9–12, 2023	500 (RV)	± 4.4%	44%	38%	2%	16%

Hypothetical polling with other candidates

Donald Trump vs. Gavin Newsom

Poll source	Date(s) administered	Sample size	Margin of error	Donald Trump Republican	Gavin Newsom Democratic	Other / Undecided
Ohio Northern University	March 6–11, 2024	1,241 (LV)	± 3.3%	51%	33%	16%

Donald Trump vs. Gretchen Whitmer

Poll source	Date(s) administered	Sample size	Margin of error	Donald Trump Republican	Gretchen Whitmer Democratic	Other / Undecided
Ohio Northern University	March 6–11, 2024	1,241 (LV)	± 3.3%	51%	34%	15%

Donald Trump vs. Robert F. Kennedy Jr.

Poll source	Date(s) administered	Sample size	Margin of error	Donald Trump Republican	Robert F. Kennedy Jr. Independent	Other / Undecided
John Zogby Strategies	April 13–21, 2024	643 (LV)	–	47%	39%	14%

Robert F. Kennedy Jr. vs. Joe Biden

Poll source	Date(s) administered	Sample size	Margin of error	Robert F. Kennedy Jr. Independent	Joe Biden Democratic	Other / Undecided
John Zogby Strategies	April 13–21, 2024	643 (LV)	–	55%	34%	11%

Nikki Haley vs. Joe Biden

Poll source	Date(s) administered	Sample size	Margin of error	Nikki Haley Republican	Joe Biden Democratic	Other / Undecided
Ohio Northern University	October 16–19, 2023	668 (RV)	± 3.8%	34%	36%	30% (Note: "Some other candidate" with 8%)
Ohio Northern University	July 17–26, 2023	675 (RV)	± 3.7%	38%	38%	24%

Ron DeSantis vs. Joe Biden

Poll source	Date(s) administered	Sample size	Margin of error	Ron DeSantis Republican	Joe Biden Democratic	Other / Undecided
Ohio Northern University	October 16–19, 2023	668 (RV)	± 3.8%	38%	41%	21%
Ohio Northern University	July 17–26, 2023	675 (RV)	± 3.7%	41%	39%	20%
Emerson College	October 6–7, 2022	1,000 (LV)	± 3.0%	49%	38%	13%
Emerson College	September 12–13, 2022	1,000 (LV)	± 3.0%	48%	38%	14%
Echelon Insights	August 31 – September 7, 2022	831 (LV)	± 4.3%	46%	40%	14%

Ron Desantis vs. Joe Biden vs. Cornel West

Poll source	Date(s) administered	Sample size	Margin of error	Ron Desantis Republican	Joe Biden Democratic	Cornel West Green	Other / Undecided
Suffolk University/USA Today	July 9–12, 2023	500 (RV)	± 4.4%	39%	37%	2%	22%

Chris Christie vs. Joe Biden

Poll source	Date(s) administered	Sample size	Margin of error	Chris Christie Republican	Joe Biden Democratic	Other / Undecided
Ohio Northern University	July 17–26, 2023	675 (RV)	± 3.7%	33%	39%	28%

Mike Pence vs. Joe Biden

Poll source	Date(s) administered	Sample size	Margin of error	Mike Pence Republican	Joe Biden Democratic	Other / Undecided
Ohio Northern University	October 16–19, 2023	668 (RV)	± 3.8%	38%	38%	24%
Ohio Northern University	July 17–26, 2023	675 (RV)	± 3.7%	37%	38%	25%

Tim Scott vs. Joe Biden

Poll source	Date(s) administered	Sample size	Margin of error	Tim Scott Republican	Joe Biden Democratic	Other / Undecided
Ohio Northern University	July 17–26, 2023	675 (RV)	± 3.7%	38%	39%	23%

Generic Republican vs. Joe Biden

Poll source	Date(s) administered	Sample size	Margin of error	Generic Republican	Joe Biden Democratic	Other / Undecided
Causeway Solutions	May 19–27, 2023	1,639 (RV)	± 2.5%	45%	33%	22%

=== Results ===
State Senate district results

State House district results

2024 United States presidential election in Ohio
Party	Candidate	Votes	%	±%
Republican	Donald Trump; JD Vance	3,180,116	55.14%	+1.87%
Democratic	Kamala Harris; Tim Walz	2,533,699	43.93%	−1.31%
Libertarian	Chase Oliver; Mike ter Maat	28,200	0.49%	−0.65%
Independent	Richard Duncan; Mitch Bupp	12,805	0.22%	+0.22%
American Solidarity	Peter Sonski; Lauren Onak	10,197	0.18%	+0.18%
Green	Jill Stein (votes not counted); Anita Rios (votes not counted)	N/A (Note: Appeared on the ballot, but votes were not counted. Some counties tallied votes as "Jill Stein/Anita Rios," and others counted as "withdrawn candidate." Some counties did not report any votes for Stein/Rios. Tallied votes at 39,044, or 0.68%)		
Write-in		2,771	0.05%	+0.02%
Total votes		5,767,788	100.00%	N/A

==== By county ====
County	Donald Trump Republican		Kamala Harris Democratic		Various candidates Other parties		Margin		Total
County	#	%	#	%	#	%	#	%	Total
Adams	10,269	82.62%	2,098	16.88%	62	0.50%	8,171	65.74%	12,429
Allen	33,201	71.28%	12,754	27.38%	621	1.34%	20,447	43.90%	46,576
Ashland	19,863	74.31%	6,544	24.48%	323	1.21%	13,319	49.83%	26,730
Ashtabula	27,656	63.47%	15,345	35.22%	574	1.31%	12,311	28.25%	43,575
Athens	11,369	43.70%	14,134	54.33%	511	1.97%	−2,765	−10.63%	26,014
Auglaize	20,988	81.57%	4,442	17.26%	300	1.17%	16,546	64.31%	25,730
Belmont	22,758	73.30%	8,080	26.02%	211	0.68%	14,678	47.28%	31,049
Brown	17,257	80.22%	4,069	18.92%	186	0.86%	13,188	61.30%	21,512
Butler	114,831	62.66%	66,713	36.41%	1,708	0.93%	48,118	26.25%	183,252
Carroll	10,634	76.76%	3,071	22.17%	148	1.07%	7,563	54.59%	13,853
Champaign	15,334	74.57%	4,944	24.04%	286	1.39%	10,390	50.53%	20,564
Clark	40,403	63.92%	21,847	34.56%	956	1.52%	18,556	29.36%	63,206
Clermont	76,964	67.11%	36,130	31.50%	1,589	1.39%	40,834	35.61%	114,683
Clinton	15,984	76.59%	4,633	22.20%	253	1.21%	11,351	54.39%	20,870
Columbiana	35,607	73.80%	12,064	25.01%	575	1.19%	23,543	48.79%	48,246
Coshocton	12,362	75.29%	3,835	23.36%	223	1.35%	8,527	51.93%	16,420
Crawford	15,402	75.74%	4,683	23.03%	251	1.23%	10,719	52.71%	20,336
Cuyahoga	195,165	33.74%	376,385	65.08%	6,820	1.18%	−181,220	−31.16%	578,370
Darke	22,234	82.01%	4,583	16.90%	295	1.09%	17,651	65.11%	27,112
Defiance	13,302	69.07%	5,667	29.42%	291	1.51%	7,635	39.65%	19,260
Delaware	70,448	52.61%	61,657	46.04%	1,801	1.34%	8,791	6.57%	133,906
Erie	22,493	56.32%	16,871	42.24%	573	1.44%	5,622	14.08%	39,937
Fairfield	51,999	61.57%	31,695	37.53%	763	0.90%	20,304	24.04%	84,457
Fayette	9,706	76.94%	2,773	21.98%	136	1.08%	6,933	54.96%	12,615
Franklin	210,830	34.89%	380,518	62.98%	12,836	2.13%	−169,688	−28.09%	604,184
Fulton	15,893	70.44%	6,374	28.25%	297	1.31%	9,519	42.19%	22,564
Gallia	10,314	79.13%	2,592	19.89%	128	0.98%	7,722	59.24%	13,034
Geauga	33,844	61.32%	20,604	37.33%	741	1.35%	13,240	23.99%	55,189
Greene	53,399	59.07%	35,575	39.36%	1,421	1.57%	17,824	19.71%	90,395
Guernsey	13,314	75.54%	4,154	23.57%	158	0.89%	9,160	51.97%	17,626
Hamilton	172,365	41.87%	233,360	56.69%	5,931	1.44%	−60,995	−14.82%	411,656
Hancock	26,052	68.53%	11,467	30.16%	499	1.31%	14,585	38.37%	38,018
Hardin	9,911	76.78%	2,863	22.18%	134	1.04%	7,048	54.60%	12,908
Harrison	5,484	77.02%	1,559	21.90%	77	1.08%	3,925	55.12%	7,120
Henry	10,873	72.61%	3,905	26.08%	197	1.31%	6,968	46.53%	14,975
Highland	16,269	81.32%	3,609	18.04%	127	0.64%	12,660	63.28%	20,005
Hocking	9,679	71.63%	3,704	27.41%	129	0.96%	5,975	44.22%	13,512
Holmes	10,384	83.84%	1,854	14.97%	148	1.19%	8,530	68.87%	12,386
Huron	19,484	71.26%	7,496	27.41%	364	1.33%	11,988	43.85%	27,344
Jackson	11,249	78.49%	2,953	20.60%	130	0.91%	8,296	57.89%	14,332
Jefferson	22,317	71.03%	8,592	27.35%	508	1.62%	13,725	43.68%	31,417
Knox	23,112	71.61%	8,698	26.95%	467	1.44%	14,414	44.66%	32,277
Lake	72,924	56.46%	54,484	42.18%	1,751	1.36%	18,440	14.28%	129,159
Lawrence	20,013	74.58%	6,514	24.27%	309	1.15%	13,499	50.31%	26,836
Licking	61,359	64.20%	32,832	34.35%	1,390	1.45%	28,527	29.85%	95,581
Logan	18,182	77.33%	5,027	21.38%	303	1.29%	13,155	55.95%	23,512
Lorain	83,297	52.12%	74,207	46.44%	2,303	1.44%	9,090	5.68%	159,807
Lucas	82,398	42.81%	106,320	55.23%	3,771	1.96%	−23,922	−12.42%	192,489
Madison	14,737	70.98%	5,713	27.52%	312	1.50%	9,024	43.46%	20,762
Mahoning	61,249	54.09%	50,636	44.72%	1,348	1.19%	10,613	9.37%	113,233
Marion	19,219	69.96%	7,902	28.77%	349	1.27%	11,317	41.19%	27,470
Medina	66,308	61.67%	39,771	36.99%	1,438	1.34%	26,537	24.68%	107,517
Meigs	8,127	77.98%	2,202	21.13%	93	0.89%	5,925	56.85%	10,422
Mercer	19,710	82.72%	3,865	16.22%	251	1.06%	15,845	66.50%	23,826
Miami	42,677	71.80%	15,969	26.87%	792	1.33%	26,708	44.93%	59,438
Monroe	5,396	79.18%	1,336	19.60%	83	1.22%	4,060	59.58%	6,815
Montgomery	125,566	48.95%	126,767	49.41%	4,211	1.64%	−1,201	−0.46%	256,544
Morgan	5,168	75.97%	1,560	22.93%	75	1.10%	3,608	53.04%	6,803
Morrow	14,609	77.17%	4,100	21.66%	223	1.17%	10,509	55.51%	18,932
Muskingum	28,147	71.45%	10,874	27.60%	373	0.95%	17,273	43.85%	39,394
Noble	5,050	81.66%	1,069	17.29%	65	1.05%	3,981	64.37%	6,184
Ottawa	14,872	61.86%	8,866	36.88%	304	1.26%	6,006	24.98%	24,042
Paulding	7,203	77.22%	1,987	21.30%	138	1.48%	5,216	55.92%	9,328
Perry	13,062	76.81%	3,800	22.35%	143	0.84%	9,262	54.46%	17,005
Pickaway	21,607	73.46%	7,397	25.15%	409	1.39%	14,210	48.31%	29,413
Pike	9,352	76.39%	2,793	22.81%	97	0.27%	6,559	53.58%	12,242
Portage	47,681	57.02%	34,759	41.57%	1,179	1.41%	12,922	15.45%	83,619
Preble	17,146	78.77%	4,343	19.95%	277	1.28%	12,803	58.82%	21,766
Putnam	16,576	83.55%	2,996	15.10%	268	1.35%	13,580	68.45%	19,840
Richland	41,298	70.76%	16,591	28.43%	473	0.81%	24,707	42.33%	58,362
Ross	22,801	68.96%	9,846	29.78%	418	1.26%	12,955	39.18%	33,065
Sandusky	19,311	64.74%	10,139	33.99%	377	1.27%	9,172	30.75%	29,827
Scioto	22,978	73.59%	8,021	25.69%	226	0.72%	14,957	47.90%	31,225
Seneca	17,241	67.87%	7,765	30.57%	398	1.56%	9,476	37.30%	25,404
Shelby	20,740	81.78%	4,350	17.15%	272	1.07%	16,390	64.63%	25,362
Stark	111,478	60.52%	71,090	38.60%	1,625	0.88%	40,388	21.92%	184,193
Summit	125,910	45.88%	145,005	52.83%	3,539	1.29%	−19,095	−6.95%	274,454
Trumbull	55,983	57.66%	39,758	40.95%	1,355	1.39%	16,225	16.71%	97,096
Tuscarawas	30,652	70.94%	12,032	27.84%	527	1.22%	18,620	43.10%	43,211
Union	23,982	63.84%	12,934	34.43%	651	1.73%	11,048	29.41%	37,567
Van Wert	11,616	78.45%	3,000	20.26%	190	1.29%	8,616	58.19%	14,806
Vinton	4,531	78.58%	1,169	20.27%	66	1.15%	3,362	58.31%	5,766
Warren	91,132	64.74%	47,128	33.48%	2,499	1.78%	44,004	31.26%	140,759
Washington	22,161	71.20%	8,600	27.63%	362	1.17%	13,561	43.57%	31,123
Wayne	36,764	69.17%	15,898	29.91%	488	0.92%	20,866	39.26%	53,150
Williams	13,461	73.50%	4,644	25.36%	209	1.14%	8,817	48.14%	18,314
Wood	36,877	54.56%	30,016	44.41%	693	1.03%	6,861	10.15%	67,586
Wyandot	8,564	74.83%	2,731	23.86%	150	1.31%	5,833	50.97%	11,445
Totals	3,180,117	54.83%	2,533,700	43.69%	86,012	1.48%	646,417	11.14%	5,799,829

==== By congressional district ====
Trump won 11 of 15 congressional districts, including one that elected a Democrat.

District	Trump	Harris	Representative
1st	46.34%	52.69%	Greg Landsman
2nd	73.41%	25.83%	Brad Wenstrup (118th Congress)
2nd	73.41%	25.83%	David Taylor (119th Congress)
3rd	29.37%	69.61%	Joyce Beatty
4th	67.94%	31.18%	Jim Jordan
5th	64.18%	34.91%	Bob Latta
6th	66.45%	32.77%	Michael Rulli
7th	54.90%	44.26%	Max Miller
8th	61.40%	37.72%	Warren Davidson
9th	52.89%	46.18%	Marcy Kaptur
10th	52.37%	46.64%	Mike Turner
11th	22.11%	77.18%	Shontel Brown
12th	65.93%	33.21%	Troy Balderson
13th	49.53%	49.57%	Emilia Sykes
14th	58.54%	40.61%	David Joyce
15th	54.10%	44.89%	Mike Carey

== Analysis ==
A heavily populated Midwestern state located mainly in the Rust Belt, with the southern portion of the state having cultural influence from the Upper South and Bible Belt, Ohio had been considered a vital bellwether state for decades and had been decided by single digits at the presidential level since 1992, but has been trending towards the political right in recent years and is now considered a moderately red state, similarly to Florida and Alaska. The state voted significantly more Republican than the U.S. at large when Donald Trump carried the state by just over eight points in the previous two elections, despite polls showing a tight race in both cycles, especially in 2020, when the state backed the losing presidential candidate for the first time in 60 years. This was the first time since 1988 that the state voted Republican in three consecutive presidential elections, and the first time since 2012 that it voted for the winner of the national popular vote. The GOP's success in Ohio during the 2022 midterms further testified to the state's rightward shift and the end of its swing-state status at the presidential level. However, Democratic policies saw success in 2023 when a majority of voters voted against raising the threshold for voter-led initiatives to 60%, and then voted in favor of enshrining abortion rights and legalizing recreational marijuana. Ohio was widely expected to be carried again by Trump in the November general election. JD Vance's selection was seen as a strategic effort to bolster support in the Midwest (especially his home state) and among Trump supporters. Though Kamala Harris lost the state by 11.2%, Ohio was 9.7% to the right of the nation, marginally less than its position in the 2020 presidential election when Joe Biden lost the state by 8% and it was 12.5% to the right of the nation.

Independent candidate Robert F. Kennedy Jr. gathered enough signatures to appear on the ballot.

The election was held concurrently with a U.S. Senate race in Ohio, in which Republican nominee Bernie Moreno unseated Democratic incumbent Sherrod Brown; this was partly credited to Trump's overall success in the state.

=== Exit poll data ===
2024 presidential election in Ohio voter demographics
Demographic subgroup	Trump	Harris	% of total vote
Ideology
Liberals	7	92	22
Moderates	45	54	41
Conservatives	94	6	37
Party
Democrats	7	92	31
Republicans	95	5	41
Independents	50	48	28
Gender
Men	60	39	47
Women	50	49	53
Race
White	60	39	85
Black	10	89	8
Latino	50	45	3
Asian	N/A	N/A	2
All other races	N/A	N/A	2
Education
Never attended college	70	29	19
Some college	53	46	25
Associate degree	65	34	15
Bachelor's degree	49	50	24
Advanced degree	39	60	18
Gender by race
White men	64	36	41
White women	56	43	44
Black men	21	78	3
Black women	4	95	5
Latino men	N/A	N/A	2
Latina women	N/A	N/A	1
All other races	47	51	4
Area type
Urban	38	61	31
Suburban	57	42	44
Rural	72	26	25
Income
<$30,000	52	47	11
$30,000 – $49,999	62	34	16
$50,000 – $99,999	49	50	32
$100,000 – $199,999	59	40	30
≥$200,000	56	44	12
Most important issue
Democracy	25	74	32
Economy	79	20	34
Abortion	29	70	15
Immigration	93	5	12
Foreign policy	N/A	N/A	3
Biden job approval
Strongly approve	1	99	16
Somewhat approve	6	94	23
Somewhat disapprove	43	55	9
Strongly disapprove	96	3	50
Abortion should be:
Legal in all cases	12	87	29
Legal in most cases	46	53	30
Illegal in most cases	94	5	28
Illegal in all cases	91	7	9
Democracy in the United States is:
Very threatened	65	34	37
Somewhat threatened	50	50	37
Somewhat secure	49	48	19
Very secure	45	55	7
First time voting?
Yes	59	40	7
No	55	45	93
White born-again or evangelical Christian?
Yes	88	12	28
No	43	56	72
Union household?
Yes	54	45	17
No	56	43	83
Mike DeWine job approval
Approve	54	45	53
Disapprove	57	43	40

=== County swings ===
Although no counties flipped, all but three counties in the state shifted rightward. Appalachian Ohio in particular shifted further to the right, with only Athens County voting for Harris.

Mahoning County voted for Trump by over 9%, shifting rightward by 7%, the largest shift in the state. Mahoning County also voted for Bernie Moreno by 0.2% in the concurrent U.S. Senate election. The county had voted Democratic from 1976 to 2016, even voting for Walter Mondale in 1984, despite Mondale losing 49 states that year.

Only three counties in Ohio shifted leftward, including Delaware County, the highest-income county in Ohio. This does support exit polls showing Harris improved among higher-income voters, particularly White women with college degrees.

Harris lost Delaware county by less than 7%, the closest a Democratic nominee has come to winning the county since 1932, with Delaware County voting to the left of the state. Sherrod Brown nearly won Delaware County, losing it by less than 2%, also to the left of the state.

== See also ==
- United States presidential elections in Ohio
- 2024 United States presidential election
- 2024 Democratic Party presidential primaries
- 2024 Republican Party presidential primaries
- 2024 United States elections

== Notes ==
Partisan clients
