= 2024 Ohio Republican presidential primary =

- March 19, 2024

79 Republican National Convention delegates

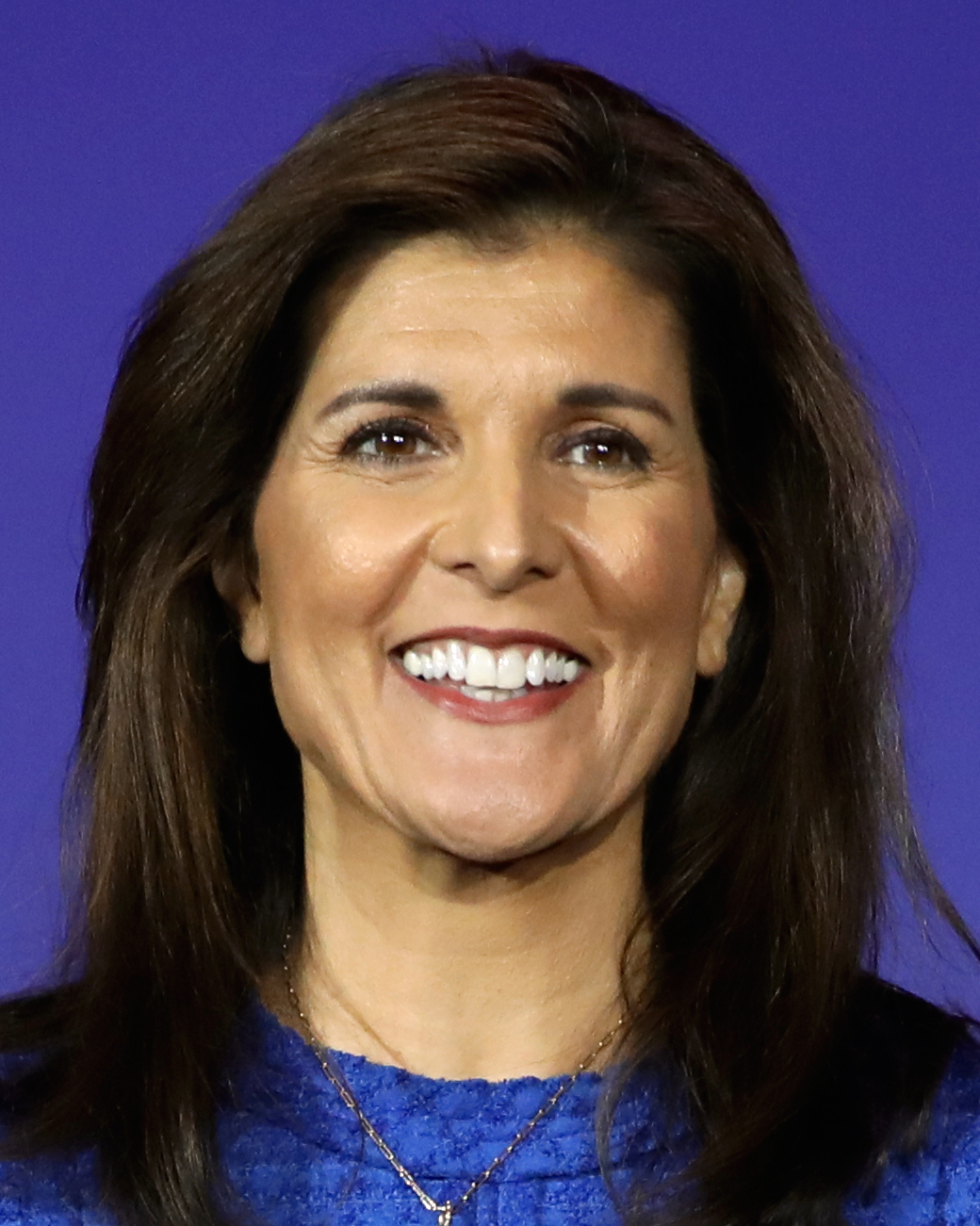
Candidate	Donald Trump	Nikki Haley (withdrawn)
Home state	Florida	South Carolina
Delegate count	79	0
Popular vote	896,059	162,563
Percentage	79.21%	14.37%
County results
Trump
60 – 70%
70 – 80%
80 – 90%
>90%

The 2024 Ohio Republican presidential primary was held on March 19, 2024, as part of the Republican Party primaries for the 2024 presidential election. 79 delegates to the 2024 Republican National Convention were allocated on a winner-take-all basis. The contest was held alongside primaries in Arizona, Florida, Illinois, and Kansas.

== Candidates ==
The filing deadline for the Ohio primary was on December 20, 2023, and the office of the Secretary of State of Ohio published the list of certified candidates on January 9, 2024.

- Donald Trump
- Chris Christie (withdrew January 10, 2024)
- Ron DeSantis (withdrew January 21, 2024)
- Nikki Haley (withdrew March 6, 2024)
- Vivek Ramaswamy (withdrew January 15, 2024)

== Endorsements ==
Ron DeSantis (withdrawn)

State representative

- Adam Mathews, 56th district (2023–present)
Nikki Haley (withdrawn)

U.S. Senators

- Rob Portman, (2011–2023)
Donald Trump

U.S. Senators

- JD Vance, (2023–2025)

U.S. Representatives

- Troy Balderson, OH-12 (2018–present)
- Mike Carey, OH-15 (2021–present)
- Bill Johnson, OH-06 (2011–2024)
- Jim Jordan, OH-04 (2007–present)
- Bob McEwen, OH-06 (1981–1993)
- Max Miller, OH-07 (2023–present)
- Mike Turner, OH-10 (2013–present) and OH-03 (2003–2013)

State executive officials

- Jon Husted, 66th Lieutenant Governor of Ohio (2019–2025) and 50th Secretary of State of Ohio (2011–2019)
- Frank LaRose, 51st Secretary of State of Ohio (2019–present); candidate for U.S. Senator in 2024
- Josh Mandel, 48th Treasurer of Ohio (2011–2019)
- Robert Sprague, 49th Treasurer of Ohio (2019–present)

State senators

- Niraj Antani, 6th district (2021–2024)
- Michael Rulli, 33rd district (2019–2024)
- Shane Wilkin, 17th district (2023–present)

State representatives

- Jon Cross, 83rd district (2019–2025)
- Jennifer Gross, 45th district (2023–present) and 52nd district (2021–2022)
- Candice Keller, 53rd district (2016–2020)
- Derek Merrin, 42nd district (2023–present) and 47th district (2016–2022)
- Craig Riedel, 82nd district (2017–2022)

Local official

- Trent R. Conaway, Mayor of East Palestine (2020–present)

Party officials

- Bob Paduchik, co-chair of the Republican National Committee (2017–2019); chair of the Ohio Republican Party (2021–2023)
- Alex Triantafilou, chair of the Ohio Republican Party (2023–present)

Individuals

- Bernie Moreno, businessman; candidate for U.S. Senator in 2024 and 2022
- Vivek Ramaswamy, businessman, candidate for U.S. President in 2024

Organization

- Ohio Republican Party
Declined to endorse

U.S. Representative

- John Boehner, OH-08 (1991–2015); Speaker of the House (2011–2015)
- David Joyce, OH-14 (2013–present)

Governors

- Mike DeWine, Governor of Ohio (2019–present)
- John Kasich, Governor of Ohio (2011–2019); candidate for president in 2000 and 2016

== Results ==
Ohio Republican primary, March 19, 2024
Candidate	Votes	Percentage	Actual delegate count		
Candidate	Votes	Percentage	Bound	Unbound	Total
Donald Trump	896,059	79.21%	79		79
Nikki Haley (withdrawn)	162,563	14.37%			
Ron DeSantis (withdrawn)	38,089	3.37%			
Chris Christie (withdrawn)	20,027	1.77%			
Vivek Ramaswamy (withdrawn)	14,450	1.28%			
Total:	1,131,188	100.00%	79		79

== Polling ==
Poll source	Date(s) administered	Sample size	Margin of error	Chris Christie	Ron DeSantis	Nikki Haley	Asa Hutchinson	Mike Pence	Vivek Ramaswamy	Tim Scott	Donald Trump	Other	Undecided
McLaughlin & Associates (R)	Dec 12–14, 2023	600 (LV)	± 4.0%	6%	11%	15%	–	–	3%	–	61%	–	4%
Morning Consult	Nov 1–30, 2023	1,881 (LV)	–	3%	11%	8%	0%	–	6%	1%	69%	0% (Note: Doug Burgum with 0%)	2%
Emerson College/Nexstar, WJW (Cleveland)	Nov 10–13, 2023	468 (LV)	± 4.5%	2%	8%	10%	1%	–	6%	1%	62%	1% (Note: Doug Burgum with 1%)	10%
Morning Consult	Oct 1–31, 2023	1,893(LV)	–	2%	13%	7%	0%	5%	8%	2%	62%	0% (Note: Doug Burgum and Will Hurd with 0%)	1%
Ohio Northern University	Oct 16–19, 2023	269 (LV)	± 2.15%	1%	10%	5%	0% (Note: No voters)	4%	9%	–	64%	1% (Note: Some Other Candidate at 1%)	6%
Morning Consult	Sep 1–30, 2023	1,621(LV)	–	3%	14%	5%	0%	5%	11%	2%	60%	0%	–
Morning Consult	Aug 1–31, 2023	1,803(LV)	–	3%	12%	3%	0%	7%	10%	3%	61%	1% (Note: Will Hurd with 1%; Doug Burgum and Francis Saurez with 0%)	–
Morning Consult	July 1–31, 2023	1,835(LV)	–	3%	16%	2%	0%	8%	9%	3%	58%	0% (Note: Doug Burgum, Will Hurd and Francis Suarez with 0%)	1%
Ohio Northern University	Jul 17–26, 2023	675 (RV)	± 3.7%	2%	9%	3%	1%	6%	12%	5%	64%	1%	3%
Suffolk University	Jul 9–12, 2023	190 (RV)	–	4%	23%	2%	2%	4%	2%	5%	48%	3% (Note: Larry Elder, Will Hurd and Perry Johnson with 1%; Ryan Binkley, Doug Burgum and Francis Suarez with 0%)	8%
Morning Consult	June 1–30, 2023	1,711(LV)	–	2%	19%	3%	1%	7%	5%	3%	59%	1% (Note: Greg Abbott, Doug Burgum, Liz Cheney, Will Hurd, Kristi Noem, and Francis Saurez with 0%)	1%
East Carolina University	Jun 21–24, 2023	405 (RV)	± 4.0%	4%	15%	2%	1%	5%	3%	–	59%	2%	10%
Morning Consult	May 1–31, 2023	1,792(LV)	–	–	20%	3%	0%	7%	5%	2%	60%	3% (Note: Liz Cheney with 2%; Kristi Noem with 1%; Greg Abbott with 0%)	–
Morning Consult	Apr 1–30, 2023	1,754(LV)	–	–	21%	2%	0%	8%	2%	2%	61%	4% (Note: Liz Cheney with 2%; Mike Pompeo and Glenn Youngkin with 1%; Greg Abbott and Kristi Noem with 0%)	–
Morning Consult	Mar 1–31, 2023	1,827(LV)	–	–	27%	4%	–	7%	0%	1%	56%	3% (Note: Liz Cheney with 2%; Mike Pompeo with 1%; Greg Abbott, Kristi Noem, and Glenn Youngkin with 0%)	2%
Morning Consult	Feb 1–28, 2023	1,573(LV)	–	–	30%	4%	–	9%	0%	1%	50%	4% (Note: Liz Cheney with 2%; Ted Cruz and Mike Pompeo with 1%; Greg Abbott, Kristi Noem, and Glenn Youngkin with 0%)	2%
Morning Consult	Jan 1–31, 2023	2,095(LV)	–	–	31%	2%	–	9%	–	1%	50%	5% (Note: Liz Cheney and Ted Cruz with 2%; Mike Pompeo with 1%; Greg Abbott, Kristi Noem, and Glenn Youngkin with 0%)	2%
Morning Consult	Dec 1–31, 2022	1,188 (LV)	–	–	33%	2%	–	8%	–	1%	48%	5% (Note: Liz Cheney with 3%; Ted Cruz with 2%; Greg Abbott, Kristi Noem, Mike Pompeo, and Glenn Youngkin with 0%)	3%
Echelon Insights	Aug 31 – Sep 7, 2022	377 (LV)	± 4.3%	–	30%	–	–	–	–	–	58%	12%	–
John Bolton Super PAC	Jul 22–24, 2022	136 (LV)	–	2%	30%	–	–	9%	–	–	28%	16% (Note: Ted Cruz with 7%; Liz Cheney with 6%; Marco Rubio with 2%; Mike Pompeo with 1%)	13%

== See also ==
- 2024 Republican Party presidential primaries
- 2024 United States presidential election
- 2024 United States presidential election in Ohio
- 2024 United States elections
- 2024 Ohio Democratic presidential primary
