= 2024 Kansas Republican presidential primary =

- March 19, 2024

39 Republican National Convention delegates

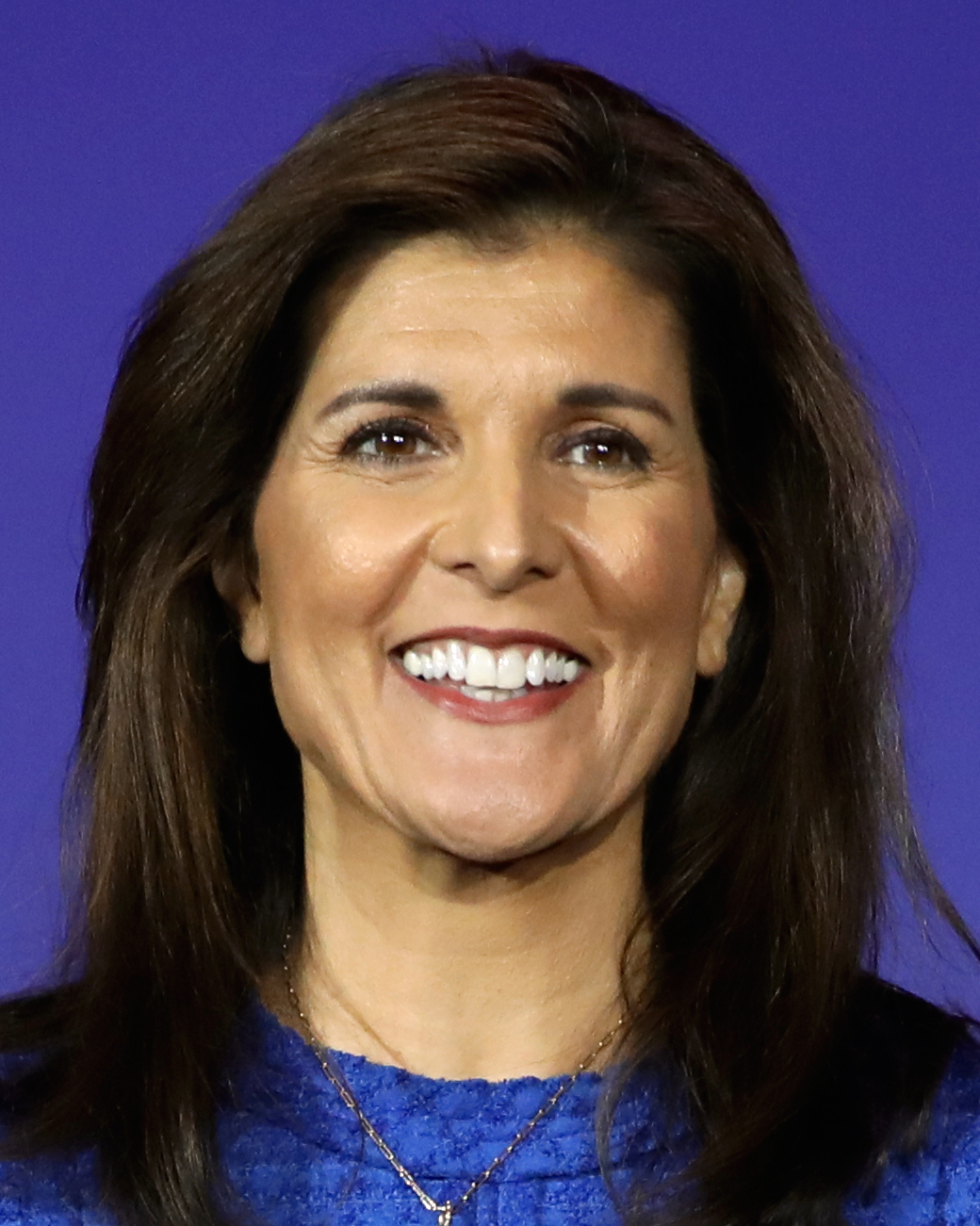

Candidate	Donald Trump	Nikki Haley (withdrawn)	None of the names shown
Home state	Florida	South Carolina	-
Delegate count	39	0	0
Popular vote	72,115	15,339	4,982
Percentage	75.52%	16.06%	5.22%
County results
Trump
60 – 70%
70 – 80%
80 – 90%
>90%

The 2024 Kansas Republican presidential primary was held on March 19, 2024, as part of the Republican Party primaries for the 2024 presidential election. 39 delegates to the 2024 Republican National Convention were allocated on a selection basis. The contest was held alongside primaries in Arizona, Florida, Illinois, and Ohio.

== Candidates ==
- Donald Trump
- Ryan Binkley (withdrew February 27, 2024)
- Ron DeSantis (withdrew January 21, 2024)
- Nikki Haley (withdrew March 6, 2024)
- None of the Names Shown

== Endorsements ==
Ron DeSantis (withdrawn)

State representatives

- Brett Fairchild, District 113 (2021–present)
- Susan Humphries, District 99 (2017–present)
- Sandy Pickert, District 88 (2023–present)
- Kristey Williams, District 77 (2015–present)
Donald Trump

U.S. Senator

- Roger Marshall, (2021–present)

U.S. Representative

- Tracey Mann, KS-01 (2021–present)

Former governor

- Jeff Colyer, (2018–2019)

State representatives

- Trevor Jacobs, District 4 (2017-present)
Declined to endorse

U.S. Senator

- Jerry Moran, (2011–present)

== Results ==
Kansas Republican primary, March 19, 2024
Candidate	Votes	Percentage	Actual delegate count		
Candidate	Votes	Percentage	Bound	Unbound	Total
Donald Trump	72,115	75.52%	39		39
Nikki Haley (withdrawn)	15,339	16.06%			
None of the Names Shown	4,982	5.22%			
Ron DeSantis (withdrawn)	2,543	2.66%			
Ryan Binkley (withdrawn)	508	0.53%			
Total:	95,487	100.00%	39		39

== Polling ==
Poll source	Date(s) administered	Sample size	Ron DeSantis	Nikki Haley	Mike Pence	Donald Trump	Other	Undecided
Remington Research	Feb 15–16, 2023	1,010 (LV)	41%	–	–	33%	–	26%
Remington Research	Feb 15–16, 2023	1,010 (LV)	17%	9%	9%	30%	9% (Note: Mike Pompeo with 9%)	19%
Echelon Insights	Aug 31 – Sep 7, 2022	192 (LV)	37%	–	–	52%	–	11%

== See also ==
- 2024 Republican Party presidential primaries
- 2024 United States presidential election
- 2024 United States presidential election in Kansas
- 2024 United States elections
- 2024 Kansas elections
- 2024 Democratic Party presidential primaries
- 2024 Kansas Democratic presidential primary
