= 1988 United States presidential election in Ohio =

- November 8, 1988
- Turnout: 71.79% ▼1.87 pp

Nominee	George H. W. Bush	Michael Dukakis
Party	Republican	Democratic
Home state	Texas	Massachusetts
Running mate	Dan Quayle	Lloyd Bentsen
Electoral vote	23	0
Popular vote	2,416,549	1,939,629
Percentage	55.00%	44.15%

Bush
50–60%
60–70%
70–80%
80–90%
90–100%
Dukakis
50–60%
60–70%
70–80%
80–90%
90–100%
No data
President before election
Ronald Reagan
Republican
Elected President
George H. W. Bush
Republican

The 1988 United States presidential election in Ohio took place on November 8, 1988. All 50 states and the District of Columbia, were part of the 1988 United States presidential election. State voters chose 23 electors to the Electoral College, which selected the president and vice president.

Ohio was won by incumbent United States Vice President George H. W. Bush of Texas, who was running against Massachusetts Governor Michael Dukakis. Bush ran with Indiana Senator Dan Quayle as vice president, and Dukakis ran with Texas Senator Lloyd Bentsen.

Ohio weighed in for this election as 3% more Republican than the national average. This is the first election since 1924 in which Ohio did not vote the same way as Wisconsin, something that would reoccur in 2000, 2004, and 2020.

The presidential election of 1988 was a very partisan election for Ohio, with more than 99% of the electorate voting for either the Democratic or Republican parties. Most counties in the state turned out more for Bush than Dukakis. Two notable exceptions to this trend were Cleveland's Cuyahoga County, and residents of several counties on the Eastern border with Pennsylvania, who voted largely for Dukakis. This was the last occasion until 2016 that Erie County, Montgomery County and Portage County voted for a Republican presidential candidate.

Bush won the election in Ohio with 55.00% of the vote to Dukakis's 44.15%, for a margin of 10.85%. This was the last time a presidential candidate won the state by double digits until 2024, when Bush's margin of victory was surpassed by Republican Donald Trump, who won the state by 11.21% that year.

== Results ==
1988 United States presidential election in Ohio
Party	Candidate	Votes	Percentage	Electoral votes
Republican	George H. W. Bush	2,416,549	55.00%	23
Democratic	Michael Dukakis	1,939,629	44.15%	0
Not Designated	Lenora Fulani	12,017	0.27%	0
Not Designated	Ron Paul	11,989	0.27%	0
Not Designated	Lyndon LaRouche	7,733	0.18%	0
Not Designated	Edward Winn	5,432	0.12%	0
Write-Ins		216	>0.01%	0
Not Designated	Larry Holmes	134	>0.01%	0
Totals		4,393,699	100.0%	23

=== Results by county ===
County	George H.W. Bush Republican		Michael Dukakis Democratic		Various candidates Other parties		Margin		Total votes cast
County	#	%	#	%	#	%	#	%	Total votes cast
Adams	5,916	60.71%	3,740	38.38%	88	0.91%	2,176	22.33%	9,744
Allen	31,021	68.97%	13,727	30.52%	227	0.51%	17,294	38.45%	44,975
Ashland	12,726	67.19%	6,072	32.06%	141	0.75%	6,654	35.13%	18,939
Ashtabula	17,654	45.79%	20,536	53.26%	366	0.95%	-2,882	-7.47%	38,556
Athens	9,314	45.92%	10,795	53.23%	172	0.85%	-1,481	-7.31%	20,281
Auglaize	13,562	73.39%	4,756	25.74%	161	0.87%	8,806	47.65%	18,479
Belmont	12,214	38.20%	19,515	61.04%	244	0.76%	-7,301	-22.84%	31,973
Brown	7,539	59.37%	5,047	39.75%	112	0.88%	2,492	19.62%	12,698
Butler	75,725	68.71%	33,770	30.64%	713	0.65%	41,955	38.07%	110,208
Carroll	6,179	56.20%	4,667	42.45%	148	1.35%	1,512	13.75%	10,994
Champaign	8,995	67.29%	4,272	31.96%	101	0.75%	4,723	35.33%	13,368
Clark	32,729	57.92%	23,247	41.14%	527	0.94%	9,482	16.78%	56,503
Clermont	37,417	70.49%	15,352	28.92%	316	0.59%	22,065	41.57%	53,085
Clinton	8,856	69.74%	3,746	29.50%	97	0.76%	5,110	40.24%	12,699
Columbiana	21,175	49.08%	21,581	50.03%	384	0.89%	-406	-0.95%	43,140
Coshocton	8,282	57.09%	6,020	41.50%	204	1.41%	2,262	15.59%	14,506
Crawford	12,472	66.70%	6,018	32.18%	210	1.12%	6,454	34.52%	18,700
Cuyahoga	242,439	40.33%	353,401	58.79%	5,277	0.88%	-110,962	-18.46%	601,117
Darke	14,914	67.93%	6,851	31.21%	189	0.86%	8,063	36.72%	21,954
Defiance	9,566	63.13%	5,448	35.95%	139	0.92%	4,118	27.18%	15,153
Delaware	20,693	72.61%	7,590	26.63%	215	0.76%	13,103	45.98%	28,498
Erie	16,670	51.77%	15,097	46.89%	431	1.34%	1,573	4.88%	32,198
Fairfield	29,208	69.46%	12,504	29.74%	339	0.80%	16,704	39.72%	42,051
Fayette	6,186	69.72%	2,623	29.56%	64	0.72%	3,563	40.16%	8,873
Franklin	226,265	59.96%	147,585	39.11%	3,507	0.93%	78,680	20.85%	377,357
Fulton	10,230	66.31%	5,076	32.90%	122	0.79%	5,154	33.41%	15,428
Gallia	7,399	59.92%	4,834	39.14%	116	0.94%	2,565	20.78%	12,349
Geauga	22,339	64.55%	11,874	34.31%	395	1.14%	10,465	30.24%	34,608
Greene	34,432	65.14%	18,025	34.10%	399	0.76%	16,407	31.04%	52,856
Guernsey	8,507	58.42%	5,926	40.69%	130	0.89%	2,581	17.73%	14,563
Hamilton	227,004	61.29%	140,354	37.89%	3,026	0.82%	86,650	23.40%	370,384
Hancock	19,896	71.97%	7,435	26.90%	312	1.13%	12,461	45.07%	27,643
Hardin	7,291	62.82%	4,145	35.71%	170	1.47%	3,146	27.11%	11,606
Harrison	3,298	45.48%	3,881	53.52%	73	1.00%	-583	-8.04%	7,252
Henry	8,618	69.12%	3,764	30.19%	86	0.69%	4,854	38.93%	12,468
Highland	8,776	66.60%	4,278	32.46%	124	0.94%	4,498	34.14%	13,178
Hocking	5,426	58.70%	3,706	40.10%	111	1.20%	1,720	18.60%	9,243
Holmes	5,064	69.22%	2,179	29.78%	73	1.00%	2,885	39.44%	7,316
Huron	12,633	61.20%	7,794	37.76%	215	1.04%	4,839	23.44%	20,642
Jackson	6,671	59.21%	4,505	39.98%	91	0.81%	2,166	19.23%	11,267
Jefferson	14,141	38.73%	22,095	60.52%	273	0.75%	-7,954	-21.79%	36,509
Knox	12,180	63.44%	6,882	35.84%	138	0.72%	5,298	27.60%	19,200
Lake	52,963	56.63%	39,667	42.41%	894	0.96%	13,296	14.22%	93,524
Lawrence	12,937	52.23%	11,628	46.95%	203	0.82%	1,309	5.28%	24,768
Licking	34,540	66.72%	16,793	32.44%	434	0.84%	17,747	34.28%	51,767
Logan	11,099	70.71%	4,484	28.57%	114	0.72%	6,615	42.14%	15,697
Lorain	50,410	47.14%	55,600	52.00%	916	0.86%	-5,190	-4.86%	106,926
Lucas	83,788	45.27%	99,755	53.89%	1,552	0.84%	-15,967	-8.62%	185,095
Madison	8,303	70.26%	3,421	28.95%	93	0.79%	4,882	41.31%	11,817
Mahoning	43,722	36.40%	75,524	62.87%	880	0.73%	-31,802	-26.47%	120,126
Marion	14,864	60.13%	9,596	38.82%	258	1.05%	5,268	21.31%	24,718
Medina	29,962	60.08%	19,505	39.11%	407	0.81%	10,457	20.97%	49,874
Meigs	5,486	59.14%	3,699	39.88%	91	0.98%	1,787	19.26%	9,276
Mercer	11,162	68.54%	4,978	30.57%	146	0.89%	6,184	37.97%	16,286
Miami	24,915	68.38%	11,138	30.57%	381	1.05%	13,777	37.81%	36,434
Monroe	2,557	37.20%	4,269	62.10%	48	0.70%	-1,712	-24.90%	6,874
Montgomery	131,596	57.48%	95,737	41.82%	1,610	0.70%	35,859	15.66%	228,943
Morgan	3,713	63.37%	2,085	35.59%	61	1.04%	1,628	27.78%	5,859
Morrow	7,130	66.26%	3,515	32.67%	115	1.07%	3,615	33.59%	10,760
Muskingum	19,736	62.31%	11,691	36.91%	247	0.78%	8,045	25.40%	31,674
Noble	3,155	59.44%	2,079	39.17%	74	1.39%	1,076	20.27%	5,308
Ottawa	9,352	53.39%	8,038	45.89%	127	0.72%	1,314	7.50%	17,517
Paulding	5,381	62.78%	3,114	36.33%	76	0.89%	2,267	26.45%	8,571
Perry	6,602	56.28%	5,011	42.72%	118	1.00%	1,591	13.56%	11,731
Pickaway	10,796	68.36%	4,905	31.06%	93	0.58%	5,891	37.30%	15,794
Pike	5,611	51.39%	5,191	47.54%	117	1.07%	420	3.85%	10,919
Portage	26,334	50.18%	25,607	48.79%	539	1.03%	727	1.39%	52,480
Preble	10,297	66.95%	4,937	32.10%	147	0.95%	5,360	34.85%	15,381
Putnam	11,183	73.09%	4,004	26.17%	114	0.74%	7,179	46.92%	15,301
Richland	30,047	60.04%	19,617	39.20%	383	0.76%	10,430	20.84%	50,047
Ross	14,563	60.39%	9,271	38.45%	279	1.16%	5,292	21.94%	24,113
Sandusky	14,203	58.61%	9,709	40.07%	320	1.32%	4,494	18.54%	24,232
Scioto	16,029	52.11%	14,442	46.95%	289	0.94%	1,587	5.16%	30,760
Seneca	13,704	58.49%	9,504	40.56%	222	0.95%	4,200	17.93%	23,430
Shelby	12,198	70.00%	5,065	29.07%	162	0.93%	7,133	40.93%	17,425
Stark	87,087	55.08%	69,639	44.05%	1,370	0.87%	17,448	11.03%	158,096
Summit	101,155	46.92%	112,612	52.23%	1,822	0.85%	-11,457	-5.31%	215,589
Trumbull	38,815	39.51%	58,674	59.72%	761	0.77%	-19,859	-20.21%	98,250
Tuscarawas	17,145	54.28%	14,185	44.90%	259	0.82%	2,960	9.38%	31,589
Union	8,846	73.28%	3,130	25.93%	95	0.79%	5,716	47.35%	12,071
Van Wert	9,410	70.56%	3,848	28.85%	78	0.59%	5,562	41.71%	13,336
Vinton	2,652	52.19%	2,385	46.94%	44	0.87%	267	5.25%	5,081
Warren	31,419	73.38%	11,145	26.03%	254	0.59%	20,274	47.35%	42,818
Washington	14,767	59.27%	9,967	40.00%	182	0.73%	4,800	19.27%	24,916
Wayne	22,320	61.64%	13,571	37.48%	317	0.88%	8,749	24.16%	36,208
Williams	10,782	69.18%	4,666	29.94%	137	0.88%	6,116	39.24%	15,585
Wood	26,013	57.89%	18,579	41.35%	341	0.76%	7,434	16.54%	44,933
Wyandot	6,178	66.87%	2,936	31.78%	125	1.35%	3,242	35.09%	9,239
Totals	2,416,549	55.00%	1,939,629	44.15%	37,521	0.85%	476,920	10.85%	4,393,699

==== Counties that flipped from Republican to Democratic ====
- Ashtabula
- Athens
- Columbiana
- Harrison
- Lorain
- Lucas
- Summit

== See also ==
- United States presidential elections in Ohio
- Presidency of George H. W. Bush
