= 2024 Illinois Republican presidential primary =

- March 19, 2024

64 Republican National Convention delegates

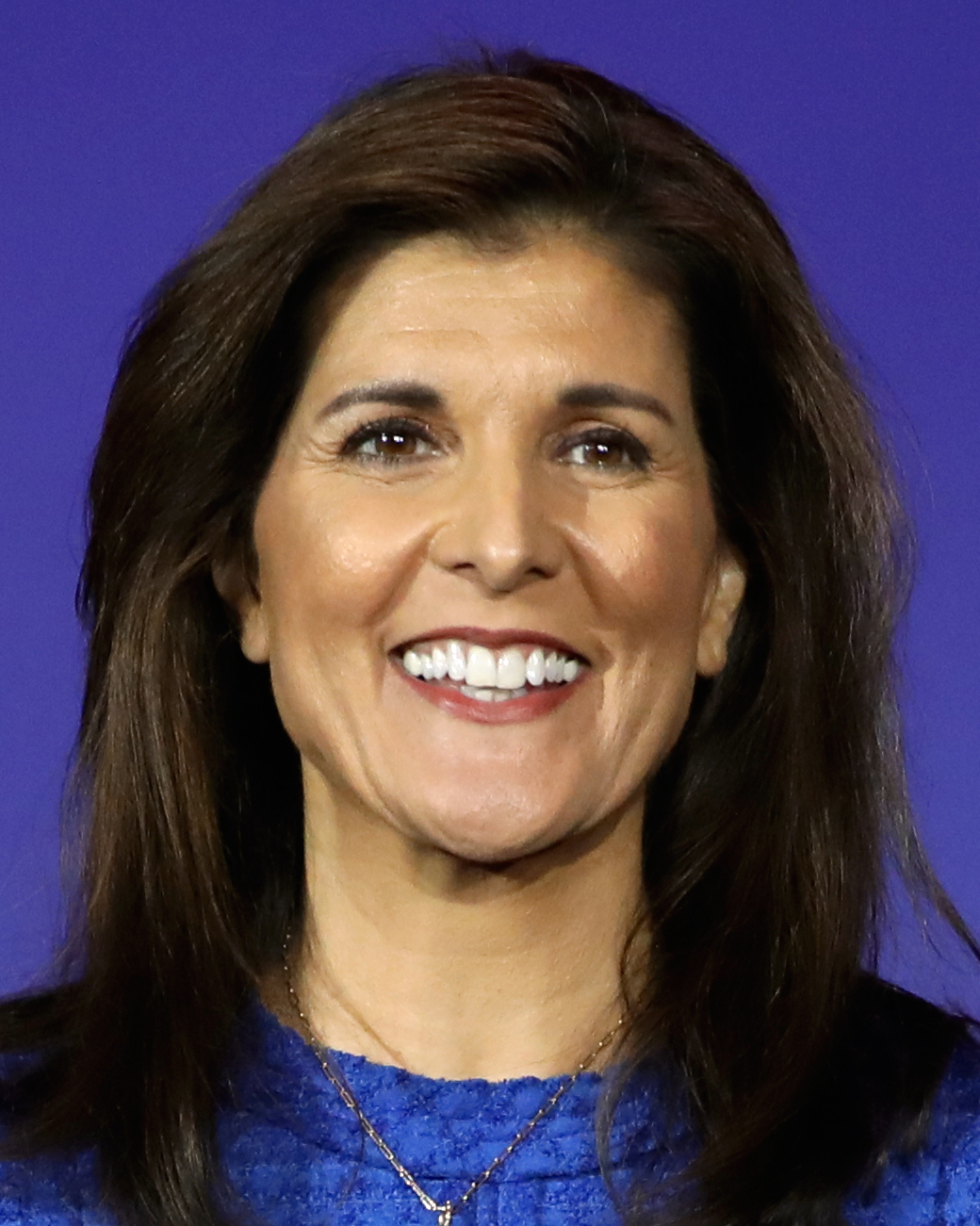
| Candidate | Donald Trump | Nikki Haley (withdrawn) |
| Home state | Florida | South Carolina |
| Delegate count | 64 | 0 |
| Popular vote | 479,556 | 86,278 |
| Percentage | 80.50% | 14.48% |
County results
Donald Trump
70–80%
80–90%
>90%

The 2024 Illinois Republican presidential primary was held on March 19, 2024, as part of the Republican Party primaries for the 2024 presidential election. 64 delegates to the 2024 Republican National Convention were allocated on a winner-take-all basis. The contest was held alongside primaries in Arizona, Florida, Kansas, and Ohio.

== Procedure ==
The petition circulation period for a candidate to place their name on the ballot began October 7, 2023. To be placed on the ballot, each candidate needed no less than 3,000 and no more than 5,000 signatures statewide. Illinois, along with Pennsylvania, elects delegates in party by congressional district, separately from the statewide preference vote. Each district elects three delegates and three alternate delegates. The signature requirements range from needing 197 signatures in Illinois's 4th congressional district to needing 1,089 signatures in Illinois's 12th congressional district. All candidates except for Binkley filed a slate of delegates in each congressional district.

== Candidates ==
During the January 4–5, 2024 filing period, five candidates filed to run in the Republican primary.

- Donald Trump
- Ryan Binkley (withdrew February 27, 2024)
- Chris Christie (withdrew January 10, 2024)
- Ron DeSantis (withdrew January 21, 2024)
- Nikki Haley (withdrew March 6, 2024)

=== Objections ===
Objections to a candidate's petitions could be filed with the Illinois Board of Elections no later than January 12, 2024. A group of objectors filed an objection to Donald Trump's petitions, arguing he is ineligible to appear on the state's primary ballot under the Fourteenth Amendment due to his role in the January 6 United States Capitol attack. The case, Anderson, Holley, Hickman, et al. v. Trump, was heard by the Illinois State Board of Elections. On January 30, 2024, the Board of Elections decided unanimously that it did not have jurisdiction, and that the power to determine constitutional eligibility rests with the courts. The challengers then brought their case to the Cook County Circuit Court to get a ruling on Trump's ballot eligibility. Additionally, objectors associated with Donald Trump's campaign challenged the candidacy of Nikki Haley and some of her delegates.

On February 28, 2024, former President Donald Trump was removed from the state ballot by Cook County Circuit Judge Tracie Porter. The decision was paused pending a Supreme Court case (Trump v. Anderson) to rule whether or not it is constitutional to do so. Trump appealed the verdict that night and also requested that the pause be extended. The candidates to be Trump-pledged delegates at the Republican National Convention remain on the ballot and if elected by voters will still be able to vote to nominate Trump whether he appears on the ballot or not.

On March 4, the Supreme Court ruled in favor of keeping Trump on the ballot.

== Endorsements ==
Ron DeSantis (withdrawn)

Former U.S. Representative

- Rodney Davis, IL-13 (2013–2023)

Former state representative

- Jeanne Ives, District 42 (2013–2019)
Nikki Haley (withdrawn)

Former governor

- Bruce Rauner, Governor of Illinois (2015–2019) (switched support from Ron DeSantis)
Donald Trump

U.S. Representatives

- Mike Bost, IL-12 (2015–present)
- Mary Miller, IL-15 (2021–present)

Former state senator

- Darren Bailey, District 55 (2021–2023)

Notable individuals

- Charlie Kirk, Turning Point USA CEO
- Shalabh Kumar, industrialist
- Nick Fuentes, white nationalist political commentator and streamer

== Polling ==
| Poll source | Date(s) administered | Sample size (Note: Key: A – all adults RV – registered voters LV – likely voters V – unclear) | Margin of error | Chris Christie | Ron DeSantis | Nikki Haley | Mike Pence | Vivek Ramaswamy | Tim Scott | Donald Trump | Other | Undecided |
|---|---|---|---|---|---|---|---|---|---|---|---|---|
| Cor Strategies | Aug 24–27, 2023 | – | – | 6% | 10% | 6% | 5% | 5% | 2% | 53% | 2% (Note: Doug Burgum and Asa Hutchinson with 1%; "Another candidate" with 0%) | 9% |
| Cor Strategies | Aug 24–27, 2023 | – | – | 6% | 26% | 10% | 10% | 16% | 9% | – | 8% (Note: Doug Burgum with 3%; Asa Hutchinson with 1%; "Another candidate" with 4%) | 16% |
| Public Policy Polling | Jun 6–7, 2022 | 677 (LV) | – | 2% | 23% | 3% | 6% | – | 2% | 51% | 5% (Note: Ted Cruz with 4%; Marco Rubio with 1%; Josh Hawley with 0%) | 8% |

== Results ==
=== Statewide ===
Illinois Republican primary, March 19, 2024
| Candidate | Votes | Percentage | Actual delegate count | | |
| Candidate | Votes | Percentage | Bound | Unbound | Total |
|---|---|---|---|---|---|
| Donald Trump | 479,556 | 80.50% | 64 | 0 | 64 |
| Nikki Haley (withdrawn) | 86,278 | 14.48% | 0 | 0 | 0 |
| Ron DeSantis (withdrawn) | 16,990 | 2.85% | 0 | 0 | 0 |
| Chris Christie (withdrawn) | 9,758 | 1.64% | 0 | 0 | 0 |
| Ryan Binkley (withdrawn) | 3,114 | 0.52% | 0 | 0 | 0 |
| Total: | 595,696 | 100.00% | 64 | 0 | 64 |

== See also ==
- 2024 Republican Party presidential primaries
- 2024 United States presidential election
- 2024 United States presidential election in Illinois
- 2024 United States elections
- 2024 Illinois Democratic presidential primary
