= 2024 Florida Republican presidential primary =

- March 19, 2024

125 Republican National Convention delegates

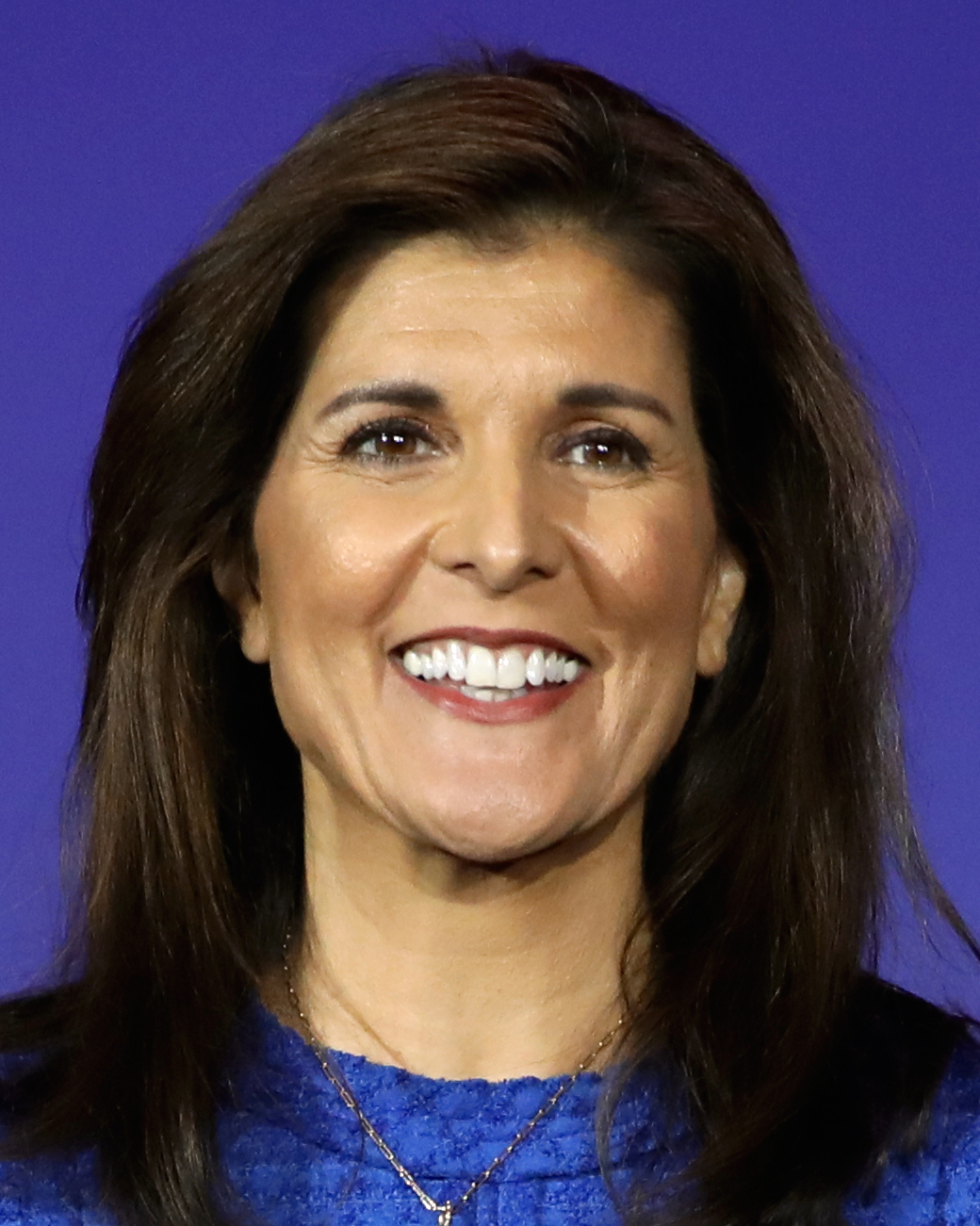
| Candidate | Donald Trump | Nikki Haley (withdrawn) |
| Home state | Florida | South Carolina |
| Delegate count | 125 | 0 |
| Popular vote | 911,424 | 155,560 |
| Percentage | 81.19% | 13.86% |
County results
Trump
70–80%
80–90%
>90%

The 2024 Florida Republican presidential primary was held on March 19, 2024, as part of the Republican Party primaries for the 2024 presidential election. 125 delegates to the 2024 Republican National Convention were allocated on a winner-take-all basis. The contest was held alongside primaries in Arizona, Illinois, Kansas, and Ohio.

Donald Trump won the primary with over 80 percent of the vote, all other candidates having withdrawn.

== Candidates ==
- Donald Trump
- Ryan Binkley (withdrew February 27, 2024)
- Chris Christie (withdrew January 10, 2024)
- Ron DeSantis (withdrew January 21, 2024)
- Nikki Haley (withdrew March 6, 2024)
- Asa Hutchinson (withdrew January 16, 2024)
- Vivek Ramaswamy (withdrew January 15, 2024)

== Endorsements ==
Ron DeSantis (suspended)

Former federal executive official

- Jesse Panuccio, Acting U.S. Associate Attorney General (2017 and 2018–2019); General Counsel to the Governor of Florida (2012–2013); Deputy General Counsel to the Governor of Florida (2011–2012)

U.S. Representatives

- ~~Laurel Lee, FL-15 (2023–present); Florida Secretary of State (2019–2022)~~ (endorsed Trump after DeSantis suspended)
- Francis Rooney, FL-19 (2017–2021)
- Tom Rooney, FL-17 (2013–2019) and FL-16 (2009–2013)

State executive officials

- Jeanette Nuñez, Lieutenant Governor (2019–present)
- Ashley Moody, Attorney General (2019–present); Judge of the 13th Judicial Circuit Court of Florida (2007–2017)
- Ryan Newman, General Counsel to the Governor (2021–present); Counselor to the U.S. Attorney General (2017)
- Stephanie Kopelousos, Director of Legislative and Intergovernmental Affairs to the Governor (2021–2023); Director of Legislative Affairs to the Governor (2019–2021); Secretary of Transportation (2007–2011)
- Bryan Griffin, Press Secretary to the Governor (2022–2023)
- Christina Pushaw, Press Secretary to the Governor (2021–2022)

State senators

- Kathleen Passidomo, District 28 (2016–present); President (2022–present); Majority Leader (2018–2020)
- Dennis Baxley, District 13 (2022–present) and District 12 (2016–2022); President Pro Tempore (2022–present)
- Doug Broxson, District 1 (2016–present)
- Jay Trumbull, District 2 (2022–present)
- Corey Simon, District 3 (2022–present)
- Clay Yarborough, District 4 (2022–present)
- Jennifer Bradley, District 6 (2022–present) and District 5 (2020–2022)
- Travis Hutson, District 7 (2016–present) and District 6 (2015–2016)
- Tom Wright, District 8 (2018–present) and District 14 (2014–2018)
- Keith Perry, District 9 (2016–present)
- Jason Brodeur, District 10 (2022–present) and District 9 (2020–2022)
- Blaise Ingoglia, District 11 (2022–present)
- Colleen Burton, District 12 (2022–present)
- Jay Collins, District 14 (2022–present)
- Nick DiCeglie, District 18 (2022–present)
- ~~Debbie Mayfield, District 19 (2022–present) and District 17 (2016–2022); Majority Leader (2020–2022)~~ (switched endorsement to Trump)
- Jim Boyd, District 20 (2022–present) and District 21 (2020–2022)
- Danny Burgess, District 23 (2023–present) and District 20 (2020–2022)
- Ben Albritton, District 27 (2022–present) and District 26 (2018–2022)
- Gayle Harrell, District 31 (2022–present) and District 25 (2018–2022)
- Jonathan Martin, District 33 (2022–present)
- Alexis Calatayud, District 38 (2022–present)
- Bryan Avila, District 39 (2022–present); House Speaker Pro Tempore (2020–2022); House Majority Deputy Whip (2016–2018)

State representatives

- Paul Renner, District 19 (2022–present) and District 24 (2015–2022); Speaker (2022–present)
- Michael Grant, District 75 (2016–present) and District 71 (2004–2008); Majority Leader
- Chuck Clemons, District 22 (2022–present) and District 21 (2016–2022); Speaker Pro Tempore (2022–present)
- Michelle Salzman, District 1 (2020–present)
- Alex Andrade, District 2 (2018–present)
- Joel Rudman, District 3 (2022–present)
- Patt Maney, District 4 (2020–present)
- Shane Abbott, District 5 (2022–present)
- Philip Griffitts, District 6 (2022–present)
- Jason Shoaf, District 7 (2019–present)
- Chuck Brannan, District 10 (2018–present)
- Sam Garrison, District 11 (2020–present)
- Wyman Duggan, District 15 (2018–present)
- Kiyan Michael, District 16 (2022–present)
- ~~Jessica Baker, District 17 (2022–present)~~ (switched endorsement to Trump)
- Cyndi Stevenson, District 18 (2022–present) and District 17 (2015–2022)
- Bobby Payne, District 20 (2022–present) and District 19 (2016–2022)
- Ralph Massullo, District 23 (2022–present) and District 34 (2016–present)
- Ryan Chamberlin, District 24 (2023–present)
- Taylor Yarkosky, District 25 (2022–present)
- Keith Truenow, District 26 (2022–present) and District 31 (2020–2022)
- Stan McClain, District 27 (2022–present) and District 23 (2016–2022)
- Tom Leek, District 28 (2022–present) and District 25 (2016–2022)
- ~~Webster Barnaby, District 29 (2022–present) and District 27 (2020–2022)~~ (switched endorsement to Trump)
- Chase Tramont, District 30 (2022–present)
- Tyler Sirois, District 31 (2022–present) and District 51 (2018–2022)
- Thad Altman, District 32 (2022–present), District 16 (2016–2022), and District 30 (2003–2008)
- ~~Randy Fine, District 33 (2022–present) and District 53 (2016–2022)~~ (switched endorsement to Trump)
- Robert Brackett, District 34 (2022–present)
- Fred Hawkins, District 35 (2022–2023) and District 42 (2020–2022)
- Rachel Plakon, District 36 (2022–present)
- David Smith, District 38 (2022–present) and District 28 (2016–2022)
- Doug Bankson, District 39 (2022–present)
- ~~Paula Stark, District 47 (2022–present)~~ (switched endorsement to Trump)
- Sam Killebrew, District 48 (2022–present) and District 41 (2016–2022)
- Melony Bell, District 49 (2022–present) and District 56 (2018–2022)
- Jennifer Canady, District 50 (2022–present)
- Josie Tomkow, District 51 (2022–present) and District 39 (2018–2022)
- John Temple, District 52 (2022–present)
- Jeff Holcomb, District 53 (2022–present)
- Randy Maggard, District 54 (2022–present) and District 38 (2019–2022)
- ~~Kevin Steele, District 55 (2022–present)~~ (switched endorsement to Trump)
- Brad Yeager, District 56 (2022–present)
- Adam Anderson, District 57 (2022–present)
- Kim Berfield, District 58 (2022–present) and District 50 (2000–2006)
- Berny Jacques, District 59 (2022–present)
- Linda Chaney, District 61 (2022–present) and District 69 (2020–2022)
- Karen Gonzalez Pittman, District 65 (2022–present)
- Traci Koster, District 66 (2022–present) and District 64 (2020–2022)
- Lawrence McClure, District 68 (2022–present) and District 58 (2017–2022)
- Danny Alvarez, District 69 (2022–present)
- Will Robinson, District 71 (2018–present)
- Tommy Gregory, District 72 (2022–present) and District 73 (2018–2022)
- Fiona McFarland, District 73 (2022–present) and District 72 (2020–2022)
- James Buchanan, District 74 (2018–present)
- Spencer Roach, District 76 (2022–present) and District 79 (2018–2022)
- Tiffany Esposito, District 77 (2022–present)
- Jenna Persons-Mulicka, District 78 (2020–present)
- Mike Giallombardo, District 79 (2022–present) and District 77 (2020–2022)
- Adam Botana, District 80 (2022–present) and District 76 (2020–2022)
- Bob Rommel, District 81 (2022–present) and District 106 (2016–2022)
- Lauren Melo, District 82 (2022–present) and District 80 (2020–2022)
- Kaylee Tuck, District 83 (2022–present) and District 55 (2020–2022)
- Dana Trabulsy, District 84 (2020–present)
- Toby Overdorf, District 85 (2022–present) and District 83 (2018–2022)
- John Snyder, District 86 (2022–present) and District 82 (2020–2022)
- Mike Caruso, District 87 (2022–present) and District 89 (2018–2022)
- Peggy Gossett-Seidman, District 91 (2022–present)
- Chip LaMarca, District 100 (2022–present) and District 93 (2018–2022)
- Fabián Basabe, District 106 (2022–present)
- Tom Fabricio, District 110 (2022–present) and District 103 (2020–2022)
- Alex Rizo, District 112 (2022–present) and District 110 (2020–2022)
- Vicki Lopez, District 113 (2022–present)
- ~~Alina Garcia, District 115 (2022–present)~~ (switched endorsement to Trump)
- Daniel Anthony Perez, District 116 (2017–present)
- Jim Mooney, District 120 (2020–present)

County officials

- Juan Fernandez-Barquin, Clerk of the Court and Comptroller of Miami-Dade County (2023–present)
- Grady Judd, Polk County Sheriff (2005–present)

Notable individual

- Ken Griffin, founder of Citadel LLC and Citadel Securities
Donald Trump

Governor

- Ron DeSantis, Governor of Florida (2019–present) and former candidate

Former federal official

- Michael Flynn, U.S. National Security Advisor (2017)

U.S. Senator

- Marco Rubio, (2011–present); candidate for president in 2016
- Rick Scott, (2019–present)

U.S. Representatives

- Gus Bilirakis, FL-12 (2013–present) and FL-09 (2007–2013)
- Vern Buchanan, FL-16 (2013–present) and FL-13 (2007–2013)
- Byron Donalds, FL-19 (2021–present)
- Mario Díaz-Balart, U.S. Representative from FL-26 (2023–present), FL-25 (2013–2023, 2003–2011) and FL-21 (2011–2013)
- Matt Gaetz, FL-01 (2017–present)
- Carlos Giménez, FL-28 (2023–present) and FL-26 (2021–2023)
- Laurel Lee, FL-15 (2023–present); Florida Secretary of State (2019–2022) (previously endorsed DeSantis)
- Anna Paulina Luna, FL-13 (2023–present)
- Brian Mast, FL-21 (2023–present) and FL-18 (2017–2023)
- Cory Mills, FL-07 (2023–present)
- Bill Posey, FL-08 (2009–present)
- John Rutherford, FL-05 (2023–present) and FL-04 (2017–2023)
- Greg Steube, FL-17 (2019–present)
- Michael Waltz, FL-06 (2019–present)
- Daniel Webster, FL-11 (2017–present), FL-10 (2013–2017) and FL-08 (2011–2013)
- Ted Yoho, FL-03 (2013–2021)

State senators

- Ileana Garcia, District 37 (2020–present)
- Joe Gruters, District 22 (2018–present); chair of the Florida Republican Party (2019–2023)
- Debbie Mayfield, District 19 (2022–present) and District 17 (2016–2022); Majority Leader (2020–2022) (previously endorsed DeSantis)
- Ana Maria Rodriguez, 40th district (2022–present) and the 39th district (2020–2022)

State representatives

- Carolina Amesty, District 45 (2022–present)
- Jessica Baker, District 17 (2022–present) (previously endorsed DeSantis)
- Webster Barnaby, District 29 (2022–present) and District 27 (2020–2022) (previously endorsed DeSantis)
- Mike Beltran, District 57 (2018–present)
- David Borrero, District 105 (2020–present)
- Randy Fine, District 33 (2022–present) and District 53 (2016–2022) (previously endorsed DeSantis)
- Alina Garcia, District 115 (2022–present) (previously endorsed DeSantis)
- Juan Porras, District 119 (2022–present)
- Rick Roth, District 85 (2016–present)
- Paula Stark, District 47 (2022–present) (previously endorsed DeSantis)
- Kevin Steele, District 55 (2022–present) (previously endorsed DeSantis)

Local officials

- Francis Suarez, Mayor of Miami (2017–present); candidate for president in 2024

Party official

- Anthony Sabatini, chair of the Lake County Republican Party (2022–present)

Notable individuals

- Kodak Black, rapper
- Colby Covington, mixed martial artist
- Johnny Damon, former MLB player
- Tony Fabrizio, pollster
- Laura Loomer, Jewish and anti-Muslim political activist
- Michael the Black Man, activist
- Roger Stone, political consultant
- Donald Trump Jr., businessman (Note: Donald Trump's son)
- Eric Trump, businessman
- Lara Trump, television producer
- Melania Trump, First Lady (2017–2021)
- Susie Wiles, political consultant
Declined to endorse

U.S. Representative

- Neal Dunn, FL-02 (2017–present)

Former governor

- Jeb Bush, (1999–2007); candidate for president in 2016

== Polling ==
Aggregate polls

| Source of poll aggregation | Dates administered | Dates updated | Nikki Haley | Donald Trump | Other/ Undecided (Note: Calculated by taking the difference of 100% and all other candidates combined.) | Margin |
|---|---|---|---|---|---|---|
| FiveThirtyEight | through February 4, 2024 | February 10, 2024 | 14.1% | 84.2% | 1.7% | Trump +70.1 |

| Poll source | Date(s) administered | Sample size (Note: Key: A – all adults RV – registered voters LV – likely voters V – unclear) | Margin of error | Chris Christie | Ron DeSantis | Nikki Haley | Asa Hutchinson | Mike Pence | Vivek Ramaswamy | Tim Scott | Donald Trump | Others | Undecided |
|---|---|---|---|---|---|---|---|---|---|---|---|---|---|
| Victory Insights | Dec 8–9, 2023 | 1,220 (LV) | ± 2.9% | 5.3% | 18.8% | 7.6% | – | – | 1.3% | – | 59.5% | 2.7% | 4.8% |
| Victory Insights | Dec 8–9, 2023 | 1,220 (LV) | ± 2.9% | – | 25.8% | – | – | – | – | – | 56.8% | – | 17.4% |
| Florida Atlantic University; Political Communication & Public Opinion Research Lab/ Mainstreet Research | Oct 27 – November 11, 2023 | 400 (RV) | – | 1% | 20% | 9% | – | – | 0% | – | 61% | 2% (Note: Other with 2%; Doug Burgum with <1%) | 6% |
| Florida Atlantic University; Political Communication & Public Opinion Research Lab/ Mainstreet Research | Oct 27 – November 11, 2023 | 400 (RV) | – | – | 30% | – | – | – | – | – | 63% | – | 7% |
| University of North Florida | Oct 23 – November 4, 2023 | 788 (LV) | ± 3.77% | 2% | 21% | 6% | <1% | 1% | 1% | <1% | 60% | <2% (Note: "Someone else" with 1%; Doug Burgum with <1%) | 8% |
| University of North Florida | Oct 23 – November 4, 2023 | 788 (LV) | ± 3.77% | – | 29% | – | – | – | – | – | 59% | – | 12% |
| Fabrizio, Lee & Associates | Oct 1–2, 2023 | 500 (LV) | – | 2% | 22% | 7% | – | 1% | 1% | 1% | 57% | 0% | 7% |
| Victory Insights | Aug 21–23, 2023 | 590 (LV) | ± 4.3% | 4% | 23% | 2% | 2% | 1% | 3% | 1% | 59% | 1% | 7% |
| Victory Insights | Aug 21–23, 2023 | 590 (LV) | ± 4.3% | – | 30% | – | – | – | – | – | 57% | – | 13% |
| Florida Atlantic University | Jun 27 – July 1, 2023 | 315 (RV) | – | 2% | 30% | 1% | 2% | 2% | 4% | 3% | 50% | – | 7% |
| Florida Atlantic University | Jun 27 – July 1, 2023 | 315 (RV) | – | – | 37% | – | – | – | – | – | 54% | – | 8% |
| Breakthrough Research/Sachs Media | Jun 9–11, 2023 | – | – | 2% | 41% | 2% | 0% | 3% | 2% | 0% | 41% | 0% (Note: Elder with 0%) | 8% |
| Victory Insights | May 25–27, 2023 | 700 (LV) | ± 3.9% | – | 38% | 3% | – | 3% | 0% | 3% | 38% | 4% (Note: Someone else with 4%) | 12% |
| Victory Insights | May 25–27, 2023 | 700 (LV) | ± 3.9% | – | 40% | – | – | – | – | – | 39% | – | 21% |
| National Research (Note: Poll sponsored by American Greatness, which supports Trump) | May 8–9, 2023 | 500 (LV) | ± 4.4% | – | 34% | 2% | 0% | 2% | 2% | 1% | 42% | 1% (Note: Chris Sununu with 1%) | 16% |
| Florida Atlantic University | Apr 13–14, 2023 | 1,081 (RV) | ± 3.0% | – | 31% | – | – | – | – | – | 59% | – | – |
| Victory Insights | Apr 6–8, 2023 | 1,000 (LV) | ± 3.1% | – | 35% | 3% | 1% | – | 4% | – | 43% | – | 14% |
| Victory Insights | Apr 6–8, 2023 | 1,000 (LV) | ± 3.1% | – | 32% | – | – | – | – | – | 47% | – | 22% |
| Emerson College | Mar 13–15, 2023 | 1,153 (RV) | ± 2.8% | – | 44% | 2% | – | 4% | – | 1% | 47% | 3% (Note: Someone else with 2%; Mike Pompeo with 1%) | – |
| University of North Florida | Feb 25 – March 7, 2023 | 550 (RV) | ± 2.6% | – | 59% | – | – | – | – | – | 28% | – | 13% |
| University of North Florida | Feb 25 – March 7, 2023 | 550 (RV) | ± 2.6% | – | 52% | 4% | – | 2% | – | 0% | 27% | 4% (Note: Liz Cheney with 3%; Ted Cruz with 1%; Kristi Noem, Mike Pompeo, Chris Sununu with 0%) | 11% |
| Victory Insights | Nov 16–17, 2022 | 700 (LV) | ± 3.7% | – | 47% | – | – | – | – | – | 37% | – | 10% |
| WPA Intelligence (Note: Poll sponsored by Club for Growth Action) | Nov 11–13, 2022 | 1,044 (LV) | – | – | 56% | – | – | – | – | – | 30% | – | 14% |
| | November 8, 2022 | 2022 midterm elections | | | | | | | | | | | |
| Victory Insights | Oct 30 – November 1, 2022 | 229 (LV) | ± 4.8% | – | 50% | – | – | – | – | – | 50% | – | – |
| Suffolk University | Sep 15–18, 2022 | 174 (LV) | – | – | 48% | – | – | – | – | – | 40% | – | 12% |
| Echelon Insights | Aug 31 – September 7, 2022 | 363 (LV) | ± 4.3% | – | 45% | – | – | – | – | – | 47% | – | 8% |
| University of North Florida | Aug 8–12, 2022 | 671 (RV) | ± 3.4% | – | 47% | – | – | – | – | – | 45% | – | 8% |
| WPA Intelligence | Aug 7–10, 2022 | 1,000 (LV) | – | – | 49% | – | – | – | – | – | 42% | – | 9% |
| Victory Insights | Jul 13–14, 2022 | 600 (RV) | ± 4.1% | – | 61% | – | – | – | – | – | 39% | – | 0% |
| Blueprint Polling (D) | Jul 7–10, 2022 | 656 (V) | ± 3.8% | – | 51% | – | – | – | – | – | 39% | – | 10% |
| Bendixen/Amandi International | March 2022 | – | – | – | 32% | – | – | – | – | – | 55% | – | 13% |
| University of North Florida | Feb 7–20, 2022 | 259 (RV) | – | – | 44% | – | – | – | – | – | 41% | – | 15% |
| Suffolk University | Jan 26–29, 2022 | 176 (LV) | – | – | 40% | – | – | – | – | – | 47% | – | 13% |
| Victory Insights | Sep 16–18, 2021 | 200 (LV) | – | – | 30% | – | – | – | – | – | 58% | – | 12% |
| Susquehanna Polling & Research (R) | Aug 4–10, 2021 | 280 (RV) | – | 1% | 34% | 3% | – | – | – | – | 43% | 10% (Note: Mitt Romney with 5%; Marco Rubio with 3%; Ted Cruz with 2%) | 8% |
| Fabrizio, Lee & Associates | Feb 15–17, 2021 | 304 (LV) | – | – | 64% | – | – | – | – | – | – | 22% (Note: Marco Rubio with 12%; Rick Scott with 10%) | 14% |
| | January 20, 2021 | Inauguration of Joe Biden | | | | | | | | | | | |
| | November 3, 2020 | 2020 presidential election | | | | | | | | | | | |
| Fabrizio, Lee & Associates | July 16–18, 2019 | 280 (LV) | – | – | 37% | – | – | – | – | – | – | 44% (Note: Marco Rubio with 26%; Rick Scott with 18%) | 19% |

== Results ==
Florida Republican primary, March 19, 2024
| Candidate | Votes | Percentage | Actual delegate count | | |
| Candidate | Votes | Percentage | Bound | Unbound | Total |
|---|---|---|---|---|---|
| Donald Trump | 911,424 | 81.19% | 125 | 0 | 125 |
| Nikki Haley (withdrawn) | 155,560 | 13.86% | 0 | 0 | 0 |
| Ron DeSantis (withdrawn) | 41,269 | 3.68% | 0 | 0 | 0 |
| Chris Christie (withdrawn) | 8,953 | 0.80% | 0 | 0 | 0 |
| Vivek Ramaswamy (withdrawn) | 2,850 | 0.25% | 0 | 0 | 0 |
| Ryan Binkley (withdrawn) | 1,385 | 0.12% | 0 | 0 | 0 |
| Asa Hutchinson (withdrawn) | 1,190 | 0.11% | 0 | 0 | 0 |
| Total: | 1,122,631 | 100.00% | 125 | 0 | 125 |

== See also ==
- 2024 Republican Party presidential primaries
- 2024 United States presidential election
- 2024 United States presidential election in Florida
- 2024 United States elections

== Notes ==
Partisan clients
