= 2024 Arizona Republican presidential primary =

- March 19, 2024

43 Republican National Convention delegates

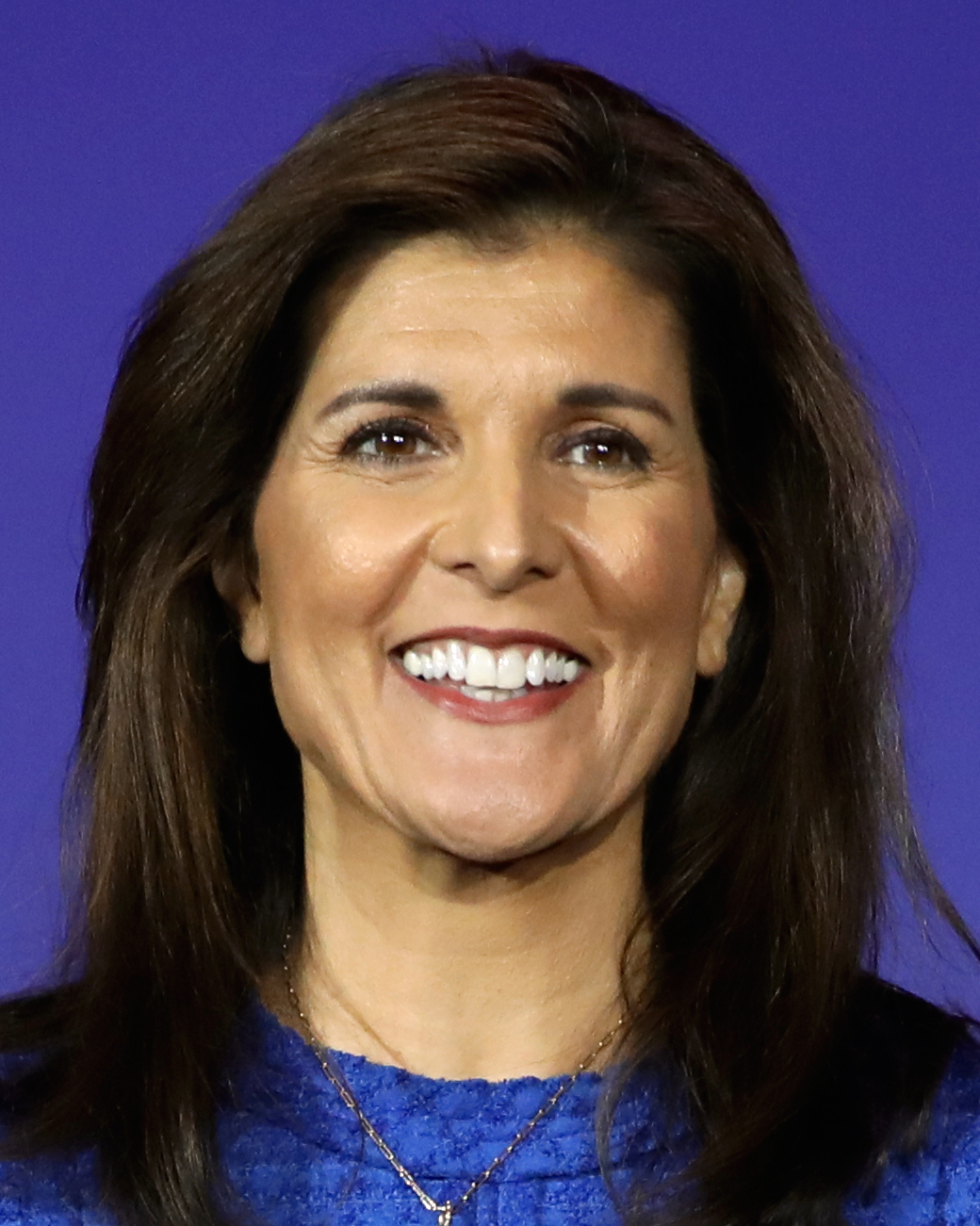
Candidate	Donald Trump	Nikki Haley (withdrawn)
Home state	Florida	South Carolina
Delegate count	43	0
Popular vote	492,299	110,966
Percentage	78.84%	17.77%
County results
Trump
70–80%
80–90%
>90%

The 2024 Arizona Republican presidential primary was held on March 19, 2024, as part of the Republican Party primaries for the 2024 presidential election. 43 delegates to the 2024 Republican National Convention were allocated on a winner-take-all basis. The contest was held alongside primaries in Florida, Illinois, Kansas, and Ohio.

== Background ==
In the 2016 Republican presidential contest, Donald Trump won the Arizona primary with 46.0% of the vote, with his nearest opponent, Senator Ted Cruz, taking 27.6% of the vote. In the 2020 primaries, the Arizona Republican Party canceled their contest.

== Candidates ==
The filing deadline was December 11, 2023. The following candidates filed:

- John Anthony Castro
- David Stuckenberg
- Donald Trump
- Ryan Binkley (withdrew February 27, 2024)
- Chris Christie (withdrew January 10, 2024)
- Ron DeSantis (withdrew January 21, 2024)
- Nikki Haley (withdrew March 6, 2024)
- Asa Hutchinson (withdrew January 16, 2024)
- Vivek Ramaswamy (withdrew January 15, 2024)

== Endorsements ==
Ron DeSantis (withdrawn)

Former federal executive official

- Donald Tapia, U.S. Ambassador to Jamaica (2019–2021)

Former U.S. representative

- Matt Salmon, AZ-05 (2013–2017) and AZ-01 (1995–2001)

State senators

- T. J. Shope, district 16 (2023–present) and district 8 (2021–2023); President Pro Tempore (2023–present); House Speaker Pro Tempore (2017–2021)
- Ken Bennett, district 1 (1999–2007 and 2023–present); Arizona Secretary of State (2009–2015); President (2003–2007)
- Steve Kaiser, district 2 (2023–present)
- J. D. Mesnard, district 13 (2023–present) and district 17 (2019–2023); House Speaker (2017–2019)
- Frank Carroll, district 28 (2023–present)

State representatives

- Ben Toma, district 27 (2023–present) and district 22 (2017–2023); Speaker (2023–present); Majority Leader (2021–2023)
- Teresa Martinez, district 16 (2023–present) and district 11 (2021–2023); Majority Whip (2023–present)
- Justin Wilmeth, district 2 (2023–present) and district 15 (2021–2023)
- David Cook, district 7 (2023–present) and district 8 (2017–2023)
- Lupe Diaz, district 19 (2023–present) and district 14 (2021–2023)
- Kevin Payne, district 27 (2023–present) and district 21 (2017–2023)
- Beverly Pingerelli, district 28 (2023–present) and district 21 (2021–2023)

County official

- Jonathan Lines, Yuma County Supervisor from district 2 (2021–present); Chair of the Arizona Republican Party (2017–2019)

Notable individuals

- Jim Lamon, founder of DEFCOM Power, Inc. and Republican candidate for U.S. Senator from Arizona in 2022
- Meghan McCain, political commentator and daughter of 2008 nominee for President John McCain (switched endorsement to Haley)
Nikki Haley (withdrawn)

Notable individuals

- Meghan McCain, political commentator and daughter of 2008 nominee for President John McCain
Donald Trump

U.S. representatives

- Andy Biggs, AZ-05 (2017–present)
- Eli Crane, AZ-02 (2023–present)
- Paul Gosar, AZ-09 (2011–present)
- Debbie Lesko, AZ-08 (2018–present)

State senators

- Anthony Kern, Member of the Arizona Senate from the 27th District (2023–present)
- Wendy Rogers, district 7 (2023–present) and 6th district (2021–2023)
- Justine Wadsack, district 17 (2023–present)

State representatives

- Mark Finchem, district 11 (2015–2023); Republican nominee in the 2022 Arizona Secretary of State election
- Rachel Jones, district 17 (2023–present)
- Cody McGarr, district 17 (2023–present)
- Austin Smith, Member of the Arizona House of Representatives from the 29th district (2023–present)

Former county official

- Joe Arpaio, Maricopa County Sheriff (1993–2017)

Notable individuals

- Kari Lake, news anchor; Republican nominee in the 2022 Arizona gubernatorial election
- Blake Masters, venture capitalist and the Republican nominee for U.S. Senator from Arizona in 2022
Declined to endorse

U.S. representative

- David Schweikert, AZ-01 (2023–present), AZ-06 (2013–2021), AZ-05 (2011–2013)

== Results ==
Arizona Republican primary, March 19, 2024
Candidate	Votes	Percentage	Actual delegate count		
Candidate	Votes	Percentage	Bound	Unbound	Total
Donald Trump	492,299	78.84%	43		43
Nikki Haley (withdrawn)	110,966	17.77%			
Ron DeSantis (withdrawn)	10,131	1.62%			
Chris Christie (withdrawn)	5,078	0.81%			
Vivek Ramaswamy (withdrawn)	2,479	0.40%			
David Stuckenberg	1,367	0.22%			
Ryan Binkley (withdrawn)	891	0.14%			
Asa Hutchinson (withdrawn)	714	0.11%			
John Anthony Castro	505	0.08%			
Total:	624,430	100.00%	43		43

== Polling ==
States polled	Dates administered	Dates updated	Nikki Haley	Donald Trump	Other/ Undecided (Note: Calculated by taking the difference of 100% and all other candidates combined.)	Margin
FiveThirtyEight	through February 4, 2024	March 5, 2024	19.9%	77.3%	2.8%	Trump +57.4

Poll source	Date(s) administered	Sample size (Note: Key: A – all adults RV – registered voters LV – likely voters V – unclear)	Margin of error	Chris Christie	Ron DeSantis	Nikki Haley	Asa Hutchinson	Mike Pence	Vivek Ramaswamy	Tim Scott	Donald Trump	Other	Undecided
Noble Predictive Insights	October 25–31, 2023	348 (RV)	± 5.25%	2%	16%	8%	0%	3%	9%	1%	53%	7% (Note: "Someone else not listed" & "None of these candidates" with 2%; Doug Burgum with 1%; Ryan Binkley, Larry Elder, Will Hurd, Perry Johnson & Francis Suarez with 0%)	–
Noble Predictive Insights	October 25–31, 2023	348 (RV)	± 5.25%	–	32%	–	–	–	–	–	68%	–	–
Emerson College	August 2–4, 2023	663 (LV)	± 3.7%	6%	11%	3%	0%	3%	4%	3%	58%	11% (Note: Doug Burgum and Will Hurd with 1%; Francis Suarez and Perry Johnson with 0%; "Someone else" with 9%)	1%
Noble Predictive Insights	July 13–17, 2023	346 (RV)	± 5.3%	2%	19%	4%	0%	5%	9%	2%	50%	7% (Note: Ryan Binkley, Doug Burgum, Francis Suarez, Larry Elder, Will Hurd, Perry Johnson, and "Someone Else not Listed" with 0%; "None of these Candidates" with 7%)	–
Noble Predictive Insights	July 13–17, 2023	346 (RV)	± 5.3%	–	38%	–	–	–	–	–	62%	–	–
J.L. Partners	Apr 10–12, 2023	550 (LV)	± 4.2%	–	24%	3%	0%	4%	2%	1%	47%	8% (Note: Liz Cheney with 4%; Mike Pompeo and Glenn Youngkin with 1%; "Someone else" with 2%)	11%
J.L. Partners	Apr 10–12, 2023	550 (LV)	± 4.2%	–	35%	–	–	–	–	–	52%	–	13%
Noble Predictive Insights	Apr 4–11, 2023	371 (RV)	± 5.1%	–	21%	4%	–	7%	–	0%	49%	20% (Note: Liz Cheney with 4%; Marco Rubio with 3%; Mike Pompeo, Chris Sununu, and Larry Hogan with 1%; Glenn Youngkin with 0%; "Someone else" with 1%; "None of these Candidates" with 9%)	–
Noble Predictive Insights	Apr 4–11, 2023	371 (RV)	± 5.1%	–	41%	–	–	–	–	–	59%	–	–
Rasmussen Reports	Mar 13–14, 2023	–	–	–	24%	–	–	–	–	–	52%	–	24%
OH Predictive Insights	Jan 31 – Feb 9, 2023	350 (RV)	± 5.2%	1%	26%	5%	–	8%	–	–	42%	11% (Note: Liz Cheney with 5%; Ted Cruz with 3%; Mike Pompeo with 2%; Marco Rubio with 1%; Kristi Noem and Glenn Youngkin with 0%)	7%
Blueprint Polling	Jan 5–8, 2023	303 (V)	–	–	34%	–	–	–	–	–	43%	–	23%
Echelon Insights	Aug 31 – Sep 7, 2022	337 (LV)	± 4.5%	–	36%	–	–	–	–	–	53%	–	11%
OH Predictive Insights	Nov 1–8, 2021	252 (RV)	± 6.2%	1%	16%	6%	–	9%	–	–	48%	9% (Note: Ted Cruz and Mitt Romney with 3%; Marco Rubio with 2%; Liz Cheney with 1%)	9%
OH Predictive Insights	Nov 1–8, 2021	252 (RV)	± 6.2%	0%	29%	8%	–	21%	–	–	–	25% (Note: Ted Cruz with 10%; Donald Trump Jr. with 8%; Mitt Romney with 4%; Marco Rubio with 2%; Liz Cheney with 1%)	16%

== See also ==
- 2024 Republican Party presidential primaries
- 2024 Arizona Democratic presidential primary
- 2024 United States presidential election
- 2024 United States presidential election in Arizona
- 2024 United States elections
