= Senator Gaetz =

Senator Gaetz may refer to:

- Don Gaetz (born 1948), Florida State Senate
- Jerry Gaetz (1914–1964), North Dakota State Senate

== See also ==
- Senator Gates (disambiguation)
