= Matt Gaetz =

American politician and TV host (born 1982)

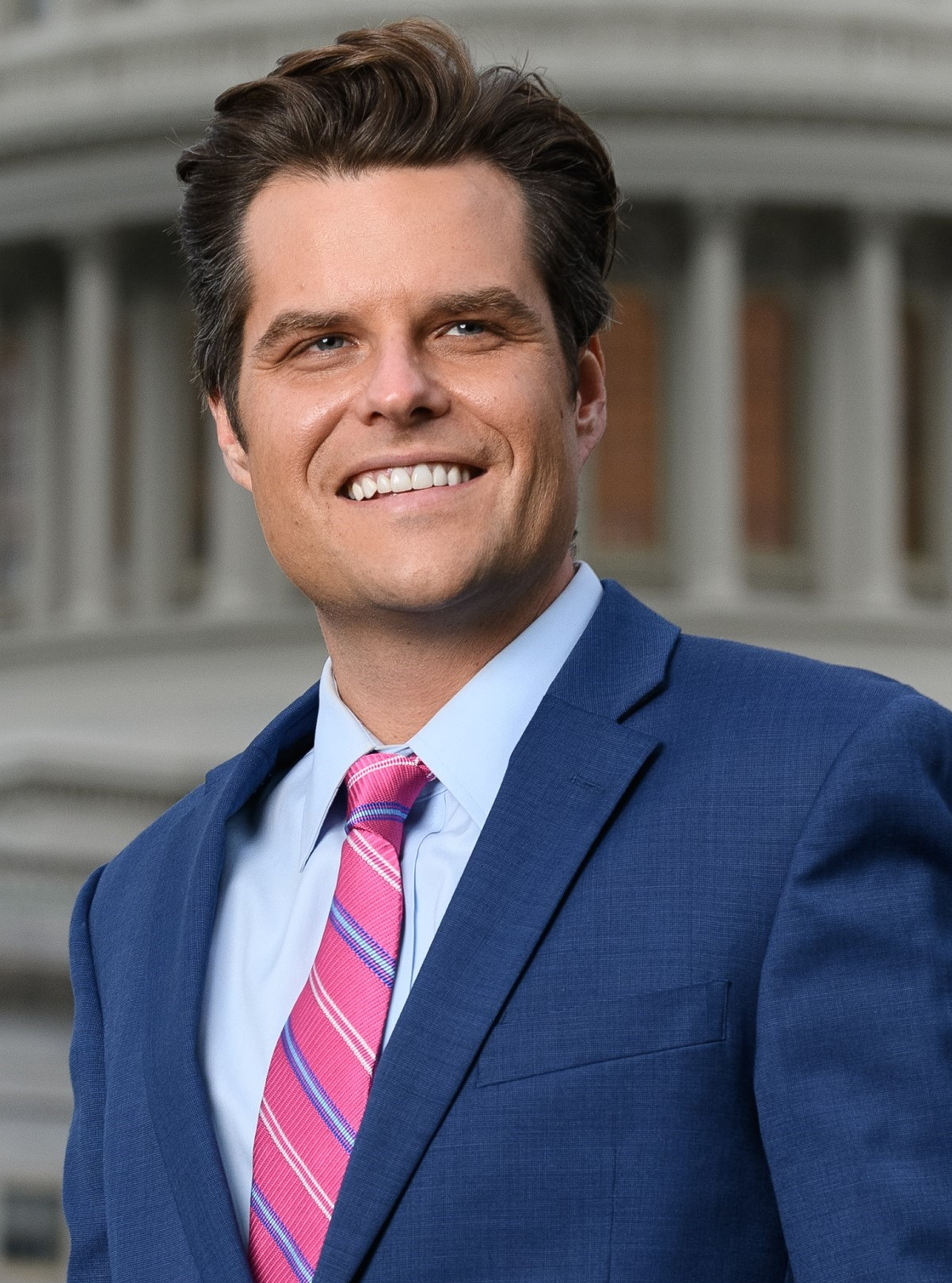
- Official portrait, 2020

Member of the U.S. House of Representatives from Florida's 1st district
- In office January 3, 2017 – November 13, 2024
- Preceded by: Jeff Miller
- Succeeded by: Jimmy Patronis

Member of the Florida House of Representatives from the 4th district
- In office April 13, 2010 – November 8, 2016
- Preceded by: Ray Sansom
- Succeeded by: Mel Ponder

Personal details
- Born: Matthew Louis Gaetz II; May 7, 1982 (age 44) Hollywood, Florida, U.S.
- Party: Republican
- Spouse: Ginger Luckey (m. 2021)
- Relations: Gaetz family
- Children: 1
- Parent: Don Gaetz (father)
- Relatives: Jerry Gaetz (grandfather); Palmer Luckey (brother-in-law)
- Education: Florida State University (BS); College of William & Mary (JD)
- Gaetz's voice Gaetz on Ileana Ros-Lehtinen's retirement Recorded July 11, 2018

Matthew Louis Gaetz II (/ɡeɪts/ GAYTS; born May 7, 1982) is an American politician, lawyer, and political commentator who served as the U.S. representative for Florida's 1st congressional district from 2017 until his resignation in 2024. His district included all of Escambia, Okaloosa, and Santa Rosa counties, and portions of Walton County. A member of the Republican Party and a self-described libertarian populist, Gaetz is widely regarded as a proponent of far-right politics as well as a staunch ally of Donald Trump. In October 2023, Gaetz filed a motion to vacate that led to the removal of Kevin McCarthy as speaker of the U.S. House of Representatives.

The son of prominent Florida politician Don Gaetz and grandson of North Dakota politician Jerry Gaetz, Gaetz was raised in Fort Walton Beach, Florida. After graduating from William & Mary Law School in 2007, he briefly worked in private practice before running for state representative. He served in the Florida House of Representatives from 2010 until 2016, and received national attention for defending Florida's "stand-your-ground law". In 2016, he was elected to the U.S. House of Representatives, and was re-elected in 2018, 2020, 2022, and 2024.

In 2020, Gaetz was accused of child sex trafficking and statutory rape. (Note: In many US states, anyone under the age of 18 is considered a child when it comes to acts such as consenting to sex or prostitution.) After an investigation, the United States Department of Justice (DOJ) decided not to charge him. In December 2024, the House Ethics Committee released a report which found evidence that Gaetz paid for sex—including with a 17-year-old—and abused illegal drugs during his tenure in the U.S. House of Representatives. The committee report did not find sufficient evidence that he had engaged in sex trafficking as defined in federal law.

On November 13, 2024, President-elect Donald Trump announced he would nominate Gaetz to serve as United States attorney general, which some Senate Republicans received poorly. Upon Trump's announcement, Gaetz resigned from the House of Representatives. A week later, he withdrew himself from consideration for the post of attorney general. Though he had already won re-election to the 119th United States Congress, he submitted a letter of resignation prior to the swearing in. Gaetz started hosting The Matt Gaetz Show, a political talk show airing weeknights on One America News Network in January 2025.

== Early life and career ==
Matthew Louis Gaetz II was born on May 7, 1982, in Hollywood, Florida, to Victoria (née Quertermous) and Don Gaetz, who later became a prominent local politician, earning Matthew Gaetz the nickname "Baby Gaetz". He has a younger sister.

He grew up in a conservative and religious family near Fort Walton Beach, and graduated from Niceville High School. He graduated from Florida State University in 2003 with a Bachelor of Science in interdisciplinary sciences. While at FSU, he was involved in the World Affairs Program Student Government Association and was a member of the Burning Spear Society. He graduated from the William & Mary Law School in 2007 with a Juris Doctor. Gaetz was admitted to the Florida Bar on February 6, 2008.

Gaetz's father represented parts of northwest Florida as a member of the Florida State Senate from 2006 to 2016, was Senate president from 2012 to 2014, and was elected to the Florida Senate again in 2024. Gaetz's grandfather, Jerry Gaetz, was the mayor of Rugby, North Dakota, and a candidate for lieutenant governor of North Dakota at the 1964 North Dakota Republican Party state convention, where he died of a heart attack.

After graduating from law school, Gaetz worked at the law firm Keefe, Anchors & Gordon (later AnchorsGordon) in Fort Walton Beach. In October 2021, the Florida bar suspended Gaetz from practicing law due to unpaid fees. He was reinstated after the $265 fee was paid.

== Florida House of Representatives ==
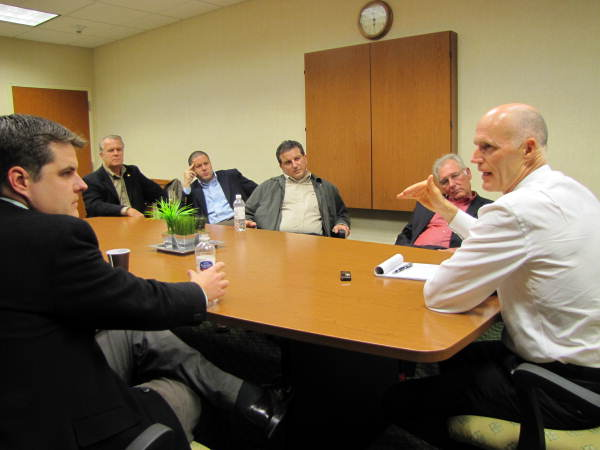
Gaetz with Governor-elect Rick Scott in 2010

In March 2010, after Republican state representative Ray Sansom's resignation on corruption charges in February 2010, Gaetz ran in the special election to succeed Sansom in the 4th district, which included southern Santa Rosa County and Okaloosa County. In a crowded Republican primary that included Craig Barker, Kabe Woods, Jerry Melvin, and Bill Garvie, Gaetz won with 43 percent of the vote. In the special general election, Gaetz defeated Democratic nominee Jan Fernald with 66 percent of the vote. During his campaign, Gaetz received almost $480,000 in contributions, about five times more than anyone else in the field, and almost 50 times more than Fernald, including $100,000 of his own money.

Gaetz was unopposed for a full term in 2010. In 2012, following the reconfiguration of Florida House of Representatives districts, Gaetz's district no longer contained any of Santa Rosa County. He was reelected unopposed in 2012 and 2014.

While serving in the state house, Gaetz and state senator Joe Negron proposed legislation that would hasten the execution of many inmates on Florida's death row by requiring the governor to sign an execution warrant for those who had exhausted their appeals. He also joined state senator Greg Evers in proposing legislation to eliminate the federal ethanol content mandate that 10 percent of gasoline sold in Florida contain ethanol; Governor Rick Scott signed the legislation in May 2013.

In 2015, Gaetz was one of two members to vote against a Florida bill which criminalized revenge porn, due to "personal animosity". He had successfully blocked the bill previously.

Florida House speaker Will Weatherford announced that he would order hearings on the stand-your-ground law. Gaetz, the chairman of the Criminal Justice Subcommittee, was tasked with reviewing the legislation; he announced before hearings that he would not support changing "one damn comma", but said he would listen to both sides' testimony. After the hearings, he authored legislation to allow defendants who successfully used a stand-your-ground defense during trial to be able to expunge relevant information from their criminal records.

When his subcommittee was considering legislation that would keep suspects' mugshots off the Internet until their convictions, Gaetz brought up his 2008 arrest and non-conviction, arguing that his mistakes made him who he is and that publicly available mugshots "could be a problem for those unaccustomed to publicity".

In 2015, Gaetz supported the presidential campaign of Jeb Bush. Bush emailed Gaetz about introducing a bill to change the 2016 Florida Republican presidential primary to an earlier date in order to benefit Bush, Florida's former governor. Don Gaetz, then the president of the Florida Senate, also endorsed Bush, along with several other members of Florida's state legislature.

== U.S. House of Representatives ==
=== Elections ===
In 2013, Gaetz announced that, in 2016, he would run for the 1st district State Senate seat held by his father, Don Gaetz, who was term-limited in 2016. On March 21, 2016, Gaetz withdrew from the race, choosing instead to run for the U.S. House seat representing Florida's 1st congressional district; the incumbent, Jeff Miller, had announced 11 days earlier that he would not seek reelection. On August 30, 2016, Gaetz won the Republican primary with 35.7 percent of the vote to Greg Evers's 21.5 percent and Cris Dosev's 20.6 percent, along with five other candidates. This virtually assured Gaetz of victory in the general election; with a Cook Partisan Voting Index of R+22, the 1st is Florida's most Republican district, and one of the most Republican in the nation.

In the November 8 general election, Gaetz defeated Democratic nominee Steven Specht with 69 percent of the vote. He was only the seventh person to represent this district since 1933 (the district was numbered the 3rd before 1963). Though a financial disclosure form Gaetz filed in 2016 showed a net worth of $388,000, he donated $200,000 of his own money to his congressional campaign. He also resigned from two Florida House political action committees he had started and chaired; the PACs closed down and transferred $380,000 to a federal super PAC, North Florida Neighbors, whose purpose was to support Gaetz's congressional campaign.

=== Tenure ===
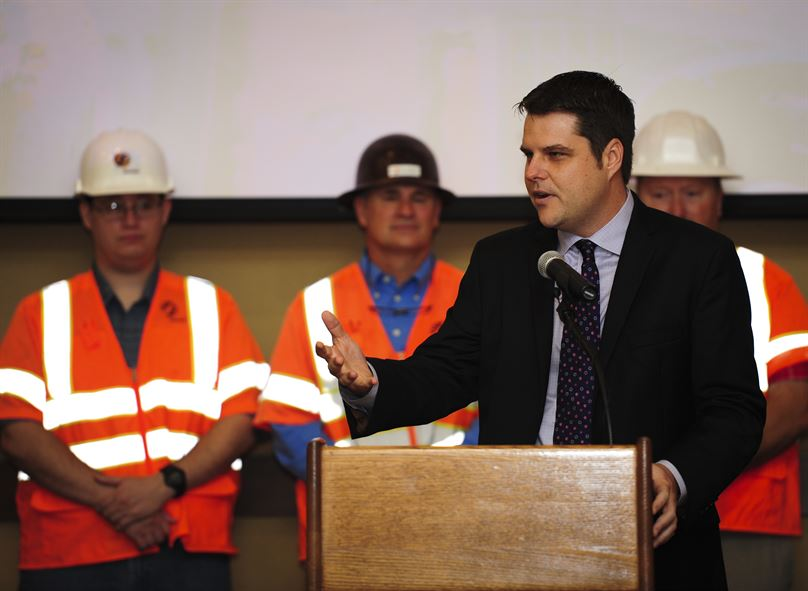
Gaetz speaking at a celebration for the completion of a Route 98 interchange in 2018

Following the death of Miami Marlins pitcher José Fernández, Gaetz criticized the athletes protesting during the national anthem in a tweet on September 25, 2016. He was listed as a member of the moderate Republican Main Street Partnership from at least January to June 2017. Gaetz served as a top campaign adviser to Ron DeSantis during his 2018 gubernatorial campaign. He managed debate preparations and "drafted early administration organizational charts, helped steer early policy decisions and played a huge role in DeSantis' appointments", according to Politico.

Gaetz hired Darren Beattie as a speechwriter in April 2019. Beattie had previously been fired as a speechwriter for the Trump administration after attending a conference associated with white nationalists. He attended political rallies in 2018 and 2019 at which members of the Proud Boys were present. After the 2020 State of the Union Address, Gaetz filed an ethics complaint against speaker of the House Nancy Pelosi, arguing that she had committed a "flagrant violation of decorum" and perhaps broken the law by ripping up her copy of the speech.

Gaetz announced that he would no longer accept campaign contributions from federal political action committees in February 2020. House Republican leader Kevin McCarthy complained on a January 10, 2021, phone call that Gaetz was unnecessarily "putting people in jeopardy", noting that the rioters at the U.S. Capitol on January 6 "came prepared with rope". The conversation was reported in April 2022.

Gaetz and Georgia representative Marjorie Taylor Greene began a nationwide "America First Tour" on May 7, 2021, in The Villages, Florida. During the tour, Gaetz and Greene repeated debunked claims of fraud in the 2020 election, attacked Big Tech and, at one event, argued that the Second Amendment was for "maintaining, within the citizenry, the ability to maintain an armed rebellion against the government, if that becomes necessary." As a consequence of the controversy the speakers had generated, their appearance at a conference site at Laguna Hills, in Orange County, California, was canceled.

Gaetz was one of 21 House Republicans to vote against a resolution to give the Congressional Gold Medal to police officers who defended the U.S. Capitol on January 6 in June 2021. Gaetz invited Corey Ryan Beekman to lead the pledge of allegiance at a Judiciary Committee hearing in February 2023. Beekman was charged with murder in 2019 in Michigan, and the victim's family criticized the invitation. Gaetz apologized to the family.

==== 2023 speakership election ====
Republicans regained a narrow House majority in the 2022 midterm elections. Although sitting minority Leader Kevin McCarthy sought the speakership and had the support of 213 members, he needed five more votes to reach a majority to be elected. Certain members of the Freedom Caucus, including Gaetz, could contribute the required margin. Democrats held 212 votes, with one seat unfilled due to the November death of a holdover incumbent. The anti-McCarthy members withheld more than four votes through 14 ballots. They were thought to be holding out for substantial concessions regarding House rules and committee chair assignments. Their withholding of votes prevented McCarthy earning a majority of votes needed for the speakership. Thirteen months earlier, Gaetz had discussed with former president Trump the possibility of getting Trump elected to the speakership, for which House membership is not required. Gaetz nominated him once and voted for Trump on the 7th, 8th and 11th ballots. After midnight, January 7, on the 15th and last ballot, Gaetz switched his vote to "present", lowering the number of votes McCarthy needed and allowing him to win the speakership.

==== Removal of Kevin McCarthy as Speaker of the House, ethics committee investigation ====
On October 2, 2023, Gaetz filed a resolution to oust McCarthy from his role as speaker of the U.S. House of Representatives after the latter had negotiated with Democrats to pass a shutdown-averting continuing resolution which did not include fiscally conservative reforms. Gaetz's resolution ended up passing by a vote of 216–210.

In April 2024, McCarthy claimed that Gaetz had pushed to remove him because he had not protected Gaetz from committee investigations into Gaetz's alleged sexual relationship with a 17-year-old minor. According to McCarthy, the House ethics committee had been investigating the case since 2021, prior to McCarthy's appointment as speaker of the House.

==== Ethics controversies ====
On February 26, 2019, the night before the scheduled public hearing of Michael Cohen, Trump's former personal attorney, before the House Oversight Committee, Gaetz directed a tweet to Cohen that implied without evidence that Cohen had had multiple extramarital affairs and also suggested his wife might be unfaithful while he was imprisoned due to new information disclosed to her. Other members of Congress saw the tweet as an attempt to intimidate a witness. Gaetz initially defended his tweet, saying it was part of "witness testing, not witness tampering" and "I don't threaten anybody". Asked to clarify, he said his "tweet speaks for itself". After sharp criticism from other members of Congress and an implicit rebuke by speaker of the House Nancy Pelosi, Gaetz deleted the tweet and posted a tweet in which he apologized.

Despite not being a member of the House Oversight Committee, Gaetz appeared at Cohen's hearing, saying that he wanted to observe and ask questions. During the hearing, U.S. Virgin Islands delegate Stacey Plaskett, a member of the Oversight Committee, recommended that Gaetz be referred to both the House Ethics Committee and criminal prosecutors for witness intimidation and tampering. After the hearing, Gaetz reportedly texted an apology to Cohen, who thanked him for it. The Florida Bar opened an investigation into Gaetz for the tweet, as did the House Ethics Committee. In August 2019, the Florida Bar announced it had found no probable cause that Gaetz had violated its rules.

Politico reported in April 2020 that Gaetz had spent nearly $200,000 of taxpayer funds renting an office from Collier Merrill, a Pensacola real estate developer and restaurateur and longtime friend, adviser, campaign donor, and legal client. Gaetz and Merrill separately told Politico that Gaetz paid below-market rent for the space, but Gaetz later said that the rent was "at or below market rate". House rules explicitly disallow below-market rentals, and require that parties to such leases "have [not] had, [n]or continue to have, a professional or legal relationship (except as a landlord and tenant)". On July 1, 2020, the Office of Congressional Ethics notified Gaetz it had terminated its review of the lease arrangements.

In July 2020, Politico reported that its investigation had found expenditures by Gaetz that appeared to violate the House ethics rules: spending tens of thousands of dollars for a speech-writing consultant and having a private company install a television studio in his father's home in Niceville, Florida, which Gaetz uses when he appears on television. Gaetz's office acknowledged that he spent $28,000 on speech-writing services, which is prohibited by House rules except in special circumstances and with prior approval from congressional officials, but said that it was a clerical error that would be fixed. Of the television studio, Gaetz said that the company received $100 per month from his office, an amount not reported in his congressional spending records, and also charged television networks each time a network connected to the studio. A statement from Gaetz's office said the arrangement complied with House rules, and that during the setup process, his office consulted with the House Ethics Committee and the House Administration Committee.

Gaetz and a dozen other Republican House members skipped votes and enlisted others to vote for them in late February 2021, citing the ongoing COVID-19 pandemic. But he and the other members were actually attending the Conservative Political Action Conference, which was held at the same time as their absences. In response, the Campaign for Accountability, an ethics watchdog group, filed a complaint with the House Committee on Ethics and requested an investigation into Gaetz and the other lawmakers.

The Intercept reported in March 2023 that Gaetz had hired Derrick Miller as his military legislative aide. Miller spent eight years in prison after he was convicted of murdering a civilian during his army service in Afghanistan.

=== Committee assignments ===
For the 118th Congress:

- Committee on Armed Services
  - Subcommittee on Cyber, Information Technologies, and Innovation
  - Subcommittee on Military Personnel
- Committee on the Judiciary
  - Subcommittee on Crime and Federal Government Surveillance
  - Subcommittee on the Administrative State, Regulatory Reform, and Antitrust
- Select Subcommittee on the Weaponization of the Federal Government

=== Caucus memberships ===
- Climate Solutions Caucus
- Congressional Blockchain Caucus
- El Salvador Caucus
- Freedom Caucus
- Republican Study Committee

== Nomination for attorney general ==
President-elect Trump announced he would nominate Gaetz to serve as United States attorney general on November 13, 2024. Gaetz resigned from the U.S. House of Representatives shortly after the announcement. His planned nomination was received negatively by multiple Senate Republicans, several of whom indicated that they would not support it due to standing allegations against him and perceived lack of qualifications.

On November 21, 2024, Gaetz announced on X that he was withdrawing his name from consideration as attorney general to avoid complicating the Trump transition. Although he had been elected to a fifth term from his district, he announced the following day that he would decline his seat in the 119th Congress, and later confirmed his resignation in writing.

Florida governor Ron DeSantis requested that an interim election be held in Gaetz's former Florida district to fill his House seat, as is the constitutional procedure when there is a resignation.

== One America News Network ==
In January 2025, Gaetz began hosting a 9 p.m. Eastern weeknight political talk show called The Matt Gaetz Show on One America News Network.

== Political positions ==
Gaetz has self-identified as a "libertarian populist". Observers have described his views as far-right. In January 2018, Gaetz invited Charles C. Johnson, an alt-right activist and Holocaust denier, to attend Donald Trump's State of the Union address. Johnson previously raised money for the neo-Nazi website The Daily Stormer. Gaetz defended Johnson in an interview, saying that Johnson was neither a Holocaust denier nor a white supremacist. Gaetz has endorsed the white nationalist Great Replacement theory. In 2021, he called the Anti-Defamation League a "racist organization" after it condemned Tucker Carlson's promotion of Great Replacement theory. Gaetz said that Carlson "is CORRECT about Replacement Theory as he explains what is happening to America."

Gaetz was an early supporter of Trump and his appeal to the Republican Party base, echoing his talking points. In several commercials during his 2016 congressional campaign, Gaetz promised to "kill Muslim terrorists and build the wall".

In a September 2022 episode of Steve Bannon's War Room podcast, Gaetz said that Republicans should prioritize "impeachment inquiries" against Democrats "to investigate them and to hold them accountable" if Republicans won the 2022 U.S. House of Representatives elections. He added, "it should be investigations [of Democrats] first—[and] policy, bill-making, to support the lobbyists and the PACs, as a far, far diminished priority."

=== Cannabis ===
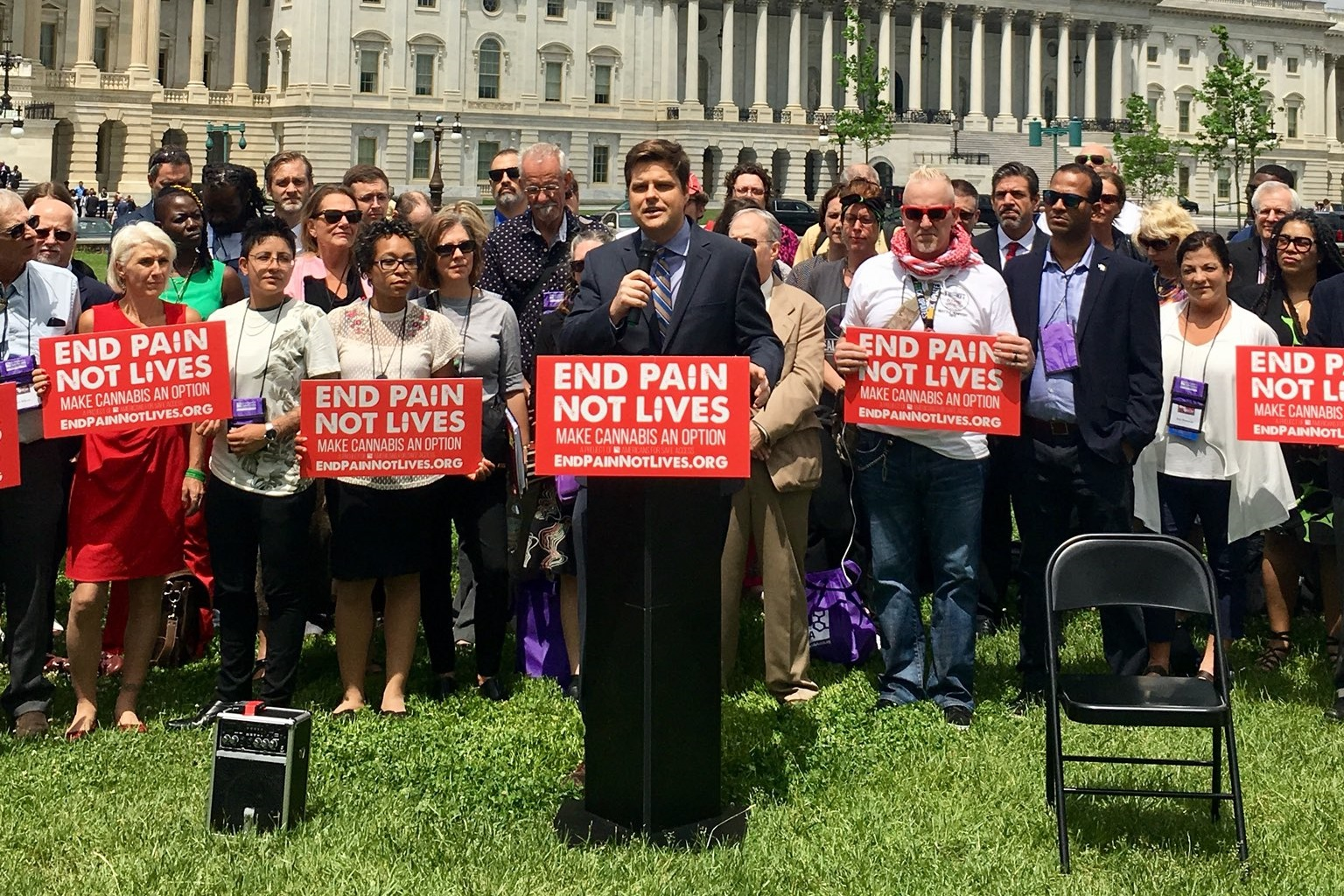
Gaetz at the U.S. Capitol in 2018 advocating for medical cannabis legislation

Gaetz has introduced legislation to reclassify cannabis from Schedule I to Schedule III under the Controlled Substances Act. He has also introduced legislation to loosen federal restrictions on the cultivation of cannabis for research purposes. Gaetz has criticized the federal government for having "lied to the American people for a generation" about the medical benefits of cannabis. As a member of the Florida House, he sponsored a bill, eventually signed into law, to expand the state's Right to Try Act to include the medical use of cannabis. In September 2017, Gaetz keynoted the American Medical Marijuana Physicians Association's annual conference.

In November 2019, Gaetz was one of only two Republicans on the House Judiciary Committee to vote for the Marijuana Opportunity Reinvestment and Expungement (MORE) Act, which among other reforms sought to remove cannabis from the Controlled Substances Act. He was also the only Republican cosponsor of the bill (of 55 cosponsors) at the time of its passage. Gaetz introduced the STATES Act to prevent federal interference in states that have legalized cannabis for medical or recreational purposes. Gaetz said he had multiple conversations with President Trump about cannabis policy.

Nonetheless, Gaetz did not find positions on marijuana to be a dealbreaker in the 2024 Republican Speaker nominee selection, repeatedly supporting anti-cannabis candidates.

=== Donald Trump ===
Worried about protesters disrupting his appearance at his town hall in Pace, Florida, Gaetz prepared what his staffers called a nonverbal town hall on February 23, 2017. He printed out part of his speech onto giant boards that he would hold up if he was unable to speak. Gaetz arrived 30 minutes late to the meeting, where at least 500 constituents crowded into a bowling alley. At the meeting, he was questioned about his relationship with Trump, his stance on repealing the Affordable Care Act, and his proposal to abolish the Environmental Protection Agency. He said that Trump should release his tax returns, but stopped short of saying Congress should subpoena them. Gaetz closed his town hall by shouting Trump's 2016 campaign slogan, "Make America Great Again".

Gaetz is seen as a vocal ally of Trump. Politico called Gaetz "one of the most enthusiastic defenders of president Trump on cable news" and a "proud Trump protégé" in April 2018. Aaron Blake of The Washington Post called him one of Congress' "most controversial members", and one who has "unabashedly aligned himself with Trump on basically all things".

In May 2018, Gaetz was one of 18 House Republicans to vote to nominate Trump for the Nobel Peace Prize for his role in peace talks with North Korea. Appearing on The View in February 2020, shortly before Trump associate Roger Stone was sentenced, Gaetz said he would support a pardon for Stone.

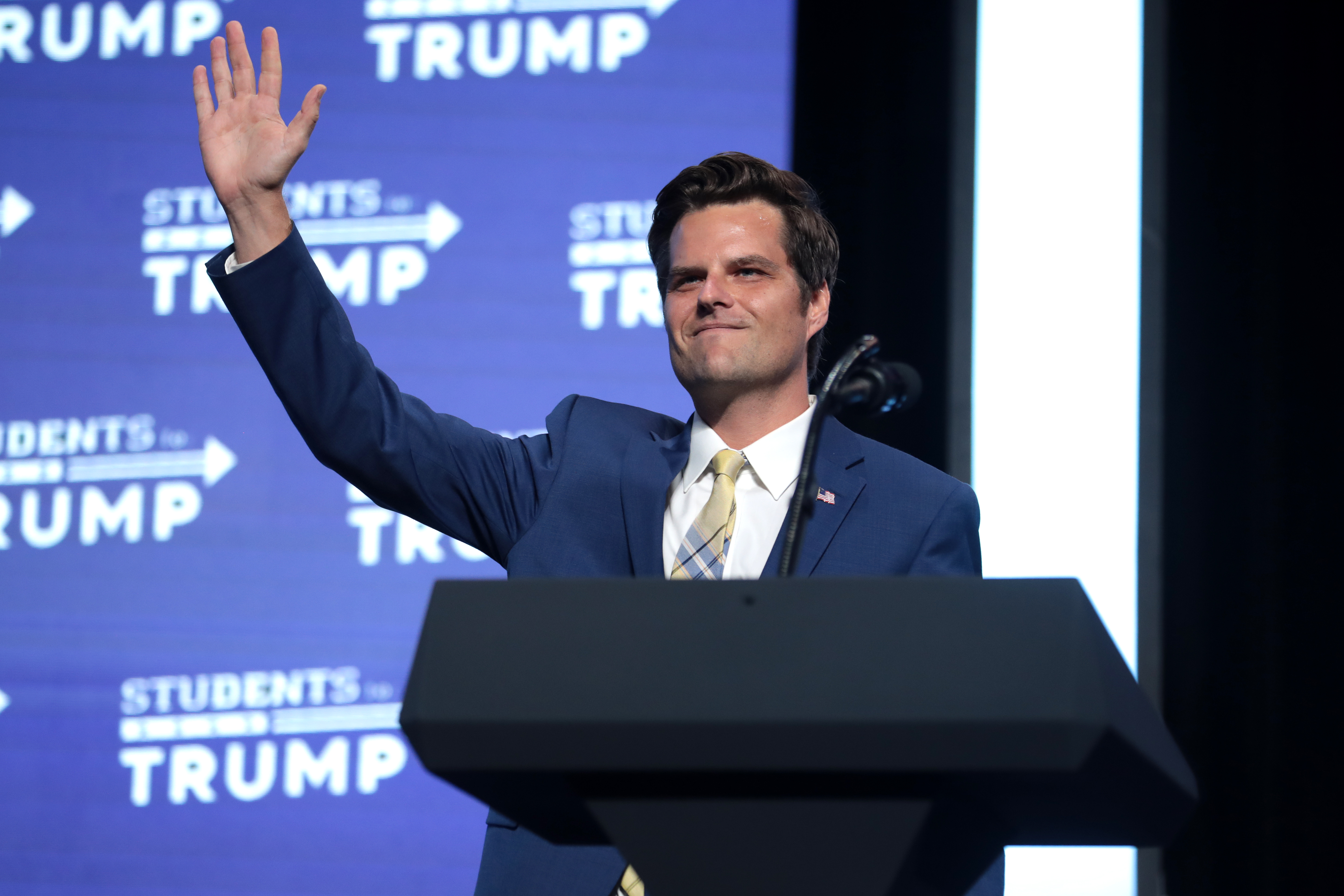
Gaetz speaking at a Donald Trump event in June 2020

Gaetz was a member of the House Judiciary Committee, but not of the Intelligence, Foreign Affairs, or Oversight and Reform Committees, and so was not allowed to join lawmakers' closed-door deposition of former White House Russia aide Fiona Hill in October 2019. He told reporters that, since his committee oversees impeachment, he should have been allowed to be part of depositions related to the Trump impeachment inquiry.

On April 6, The New York Times reported that during the final weeks of Trump's first presidency, Gaetz privately asked the White House for a blanket pardon for himself and some unknown congressional allies for any crimes they may have committed. The White House reportedly never seriously considered the request, because it was decided that issuing preemptive pardons would set a bad precedent. The Times also reported that aides had told Trump of the request. On April 7, Trump denied that Gaetz had asked him for a pardon and noted that Gaetz "totally denied the accusations against him". The same day, CNN's Maggie Haberman revealed that Trump had reportedly wanted to defend Gaetz, but that his advisors talked him out of it due to the seriousness of the allegations.

==== Mueller investigation ====
In November 2017, Gaetz introduced a congressional resolution calling for Robert Mueller to recuse himself as special counsel because of what were said to be conflicts of interest. He also asked for a special counsel investigation into the Federal Bureau of Investigation's handling of the Hillary Clinton email controversy, undue interference by U.S. attorney general Loretta Lynch in the investigation, and the Russian state corporation Rosatom's acquisition of Uranium One during Mueller's time as FBI director. Gaetz said he did not trust Mueller to lead the investigation because of Mueller's alleged involvement in approval of the Uranium One deal and alleged close relationship with dismissed FBI director James Comey, a probable person of interest in a proposed new investigation.

After Ohio congressman Jim Jordan denied that he was aware of the sexual abuse of Ohio State University wrestlers during the period when Jordan was a coach there, Gaetz said that the allegations came from people in the "deep state" and were intended to reduce the credibility of Jordan's criticism of Mueller's investigation of the Trump campaign and Russia. Gaetz said of then–U.S. attorney general Jeff Sessions that "over at the Department of Justice, he's got Stockholm syndrome, he's become sympathetic with his captors over there in the Deep State."

During Mueller's testimony to two congressional committees on July 24, 2019, Gaetz told him, "If Russians were lying to Christopher Steele to undermine our confidence in our newly elected president, that would be precisely in your purview because you stated in your opening that the organizing principle was to fully and thoroughly investigate Russian interference. But you weren't interested in whether the Russians interfered through Steele—and if Steele was lying, then you should have charged him with lying like you charged a variety of other people."

==== First impeachment of Donald Trump ====
In October 2019, Gaetz organized a "storming" of a Sensitive Compartmented Information Facility on Capitol Hill by about two dozen Republican congressmen, including House minority whip Steve Scalise, in an effort to sit in on and hear the deposition of a Pentagon official during the impeachment inquiry into Trump. The congressmens' cell phones and other devices put the secure facility, and U.S. national security, at risk.

One committee member said, "It was the closest thing I've seen around here to mass civil unrest as a member of Congress." House Homeland Security Committee chairman Bennie Thompson of Mississippi wrote to the House sergeant-at-arms about Gaetz and others, requesting that he take action regarding their "unprecedented breach of security". South Carolina's senior U.S. senator, Lindsey Graham, admonished the House members, calling them "nuts" for having made a "run on the SCIF". Ohio representative Jim Jordan said, "The members have just had it, and they want to be able to see and represent their constituents and find out what's going on." A day later, Jordan appeared on Fox News to justify the intrusion, saying of the chair of the committee: "Adam Schiff is doing this unfair, partisan process in secret and our members finally said, 'Enough'. We're so frustrated. They reached a boiling point and these guys marched in and said we want to know what's going on." In the 116th Congress, Pelosi, who is a committee member ex officio, appointed Schiff and 12 Democratic members of the House Intelligence Committee. House minority leader Kevin McCarthy, also an ex officio member, appointed the ranking member, Devin Nunes, and eight other Republicans to the committee. Each side got equal time to question witnesses. The disruption delayed Deputy Assistant Defense Secretary Laura Cooper's testimony by many hours.

==== Second impeachment of Donald Trump ====
On January 7, 2021, after Trump supporters violently broke into the U.S. Capitol, Gaetz falsely blamed antifa for the attack, suggesting that rioters were "masquerading as Trump supporters". Joel Valdez, a senior communications aide to Gaetz, posted a video on Parler hours before the storming of the Capitol with the caption "From the top of the Capitol office buildings, WE HEAR YOU LOUD AND CLEAR! #StopTheSteal". Gaetz voted against the second impeachment of Donald Trump.

=== Support for impeaching President Biden and Secretary Mayorkas ===
Gaetz co-sponsored a resolution by Andy Biggs to impeach Secretary of Homeland Security Alejandro Mayorkas in August 2021. Later that month, Gaetz co-sponsored a resolution by Representative Marjorie Taylor Greene to impeach president Biden. In September 2022, he called impeaching Biden a "priority". He expressed the belief that many Republicans in Congress were hesitant to impeach Biden, but that Republican voters would feel "betrayed" if they did not. Very early into the 118th Congress, Gaetz cosponsored another resolution to impeach Mayorkas. In May 2023, Gaetz co-sponsored resolutions by Marjorie Taylor Greene to impeach Biden and Mayorkas.

During an invitation-only video conference moderated by Steve Bannon days after a Biden impeachment inquiry was opened in September 2023, Gaetz denounced the impeachment effort as a political stunt. Gaetz said, "I don't believe that we are endeavoring upon a legitimate impeachment of Joe Biden ... I think it's for the sake of having another bad thing to say about Joe Biden."

=== Economy ===
Gaetz voted for the Tax Cuts and Jobs Act of 2017. He acknowledged that the bill's pass-through tax deduction would benefit Trump, but added, "so many Americans benefit when commercial real estate becomes easier and more accessible." He was among the 71 Republicans who voted against final passage of the Fiscal Responsibility Act of 2023 in the House.

=== Environment ===
Gaetz acknowledged global warming in 2016 but said he disagrees with the scientific consensus on climate change that human activity is the primary cause. In April 2017, the Center for American Progress and Vice Media said Gaetz was a climate change denier, citing his 2016 statements. Gaetz proposed legislation to abolish the Environmental Protection Agency in January 2017, claiming that it hurts small businesses via the costs associated with compliance.

Gaetz joined the bipartisan Climate Solutions Caucus in November 2017. He said he advocated technological innovation and economic incentives that address climate change, and increased federal funds for global warming research by NASA, NOAA and universities, but remained opposed to increased environmental regulation.

Gaetz and Democratic Representative Scott Peters introduced the bipartisan Super Pollutants Act, which aimed to slow climate change by regulating greenhouses gases, especially black carbon, hydrofluorocarbons, and methane, in 2019. A press release stated, "These short-lived climate pollutants, also called super pollutants, are significantly more potent than carbon dioxide."

=== Foreign policy ===
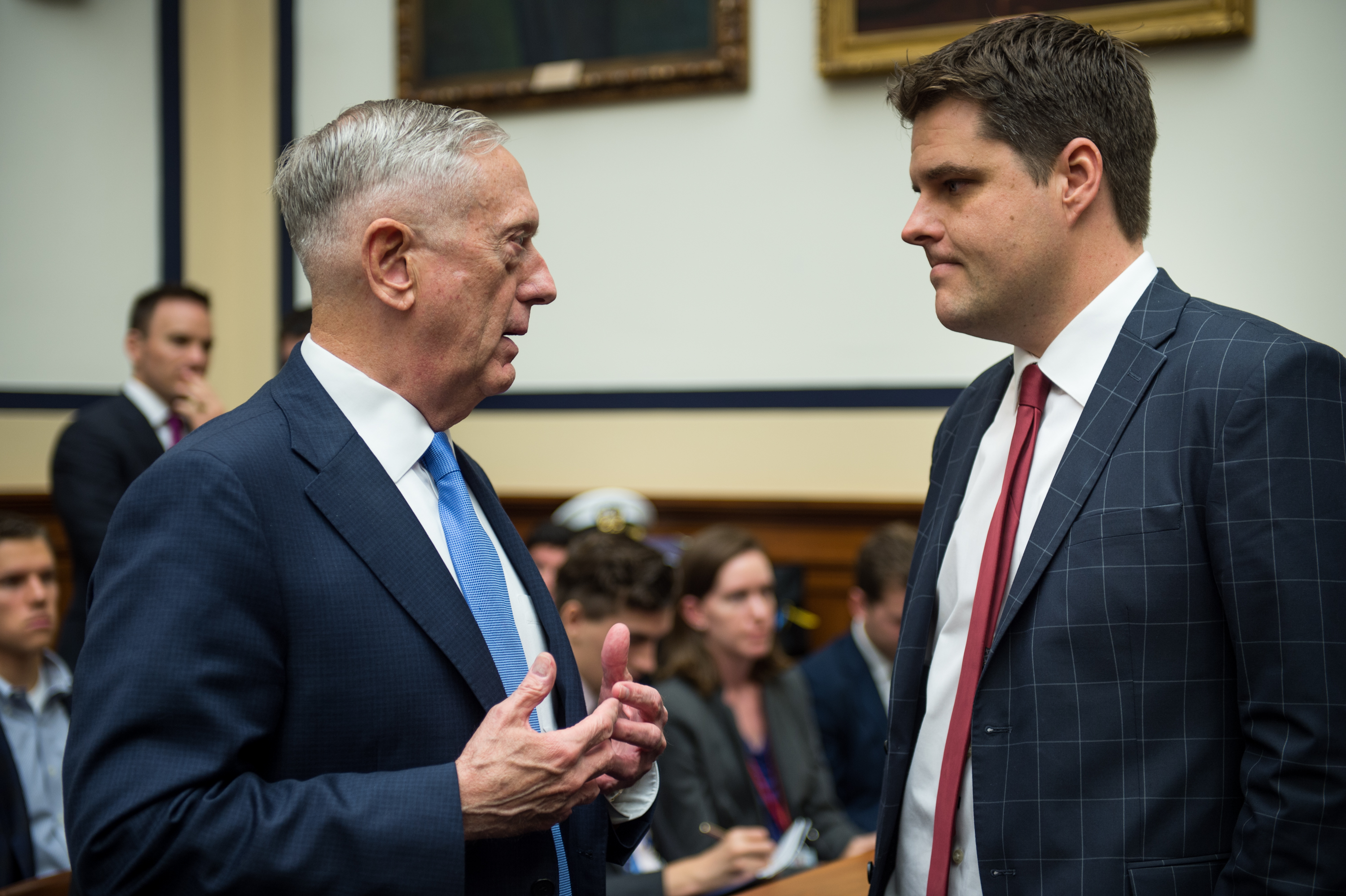
Gaetz speaks with Secretary of Defense James Mattis in October 2017.

==== Myanmar ====
In 2021, Gaetz was one of 14 House Republicans to vote against a measure condemning the Myanmar coup d'état that overwhelmingly passed, for reasons reported to be unclear.

==== Middle East ====
On October 12, 2017, Gaetz introduced a resolution affirming the connection between the Jewish people and Jerusalem and condemning UNESCO's efforts to the contrary. In December 2017, he supported Trump's decision to recognize Jerusalem as Israel's capital and said that the move would pressure Palestine to recognize Israel. In 2019, Gaetz was one of 60 representatives to vote against condemning Trump's withdrawal from Syria.

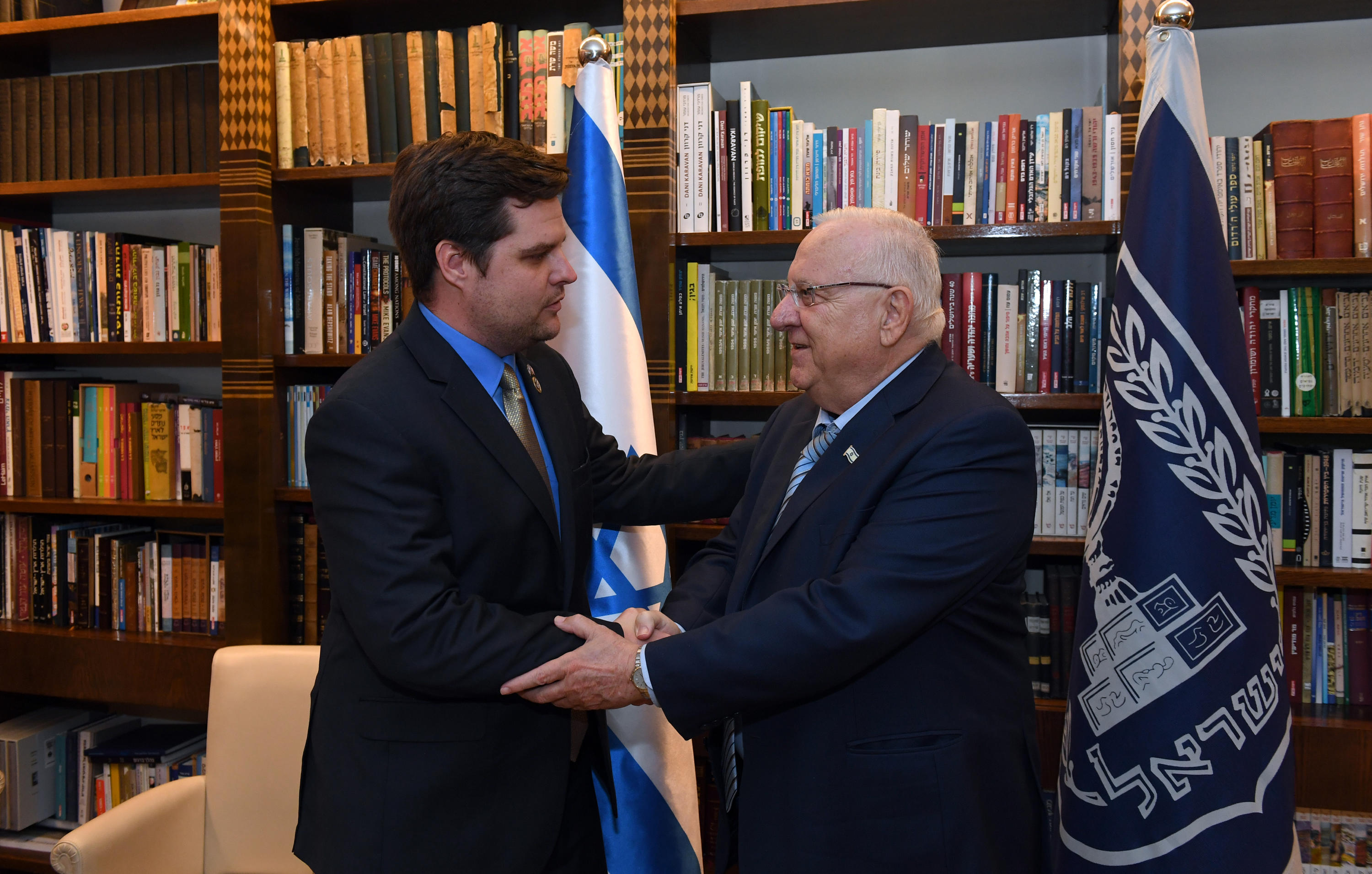
Gaetz with Israeli president Reuven Rivlin in May 2018

In April 2019, after the House passed a resolution withdrawing American support for the Saudi Arabian-led intervention in Yemen, Gaetz was one of nine lawmakers to sign a letter to Trump requesting a meeting with him and urging him to sign Senate Joint Resolution 7, which invokes the War Powers Act of 1973, to end unauthorized US military participation in the Saudi-led coalition's armed conflict against Houthi forces in Yemen.

In June 2021, Gaetz was one of 49 House Republicans to vote to repeal the Authorization for Use of Military Force Against Iraq Resolution of 2002. In 2023, Gaetz was among 47 Republicans to vote in favor of H.Con.Res. 21, which directed president Joe Biden to remove U.S. troops from Syria within 180 days.

Gaetz voted to provide Israel with support following 2023 Hamas attack on Israel. After leaving office, Gaetz shifted to criticizing Israel, opposing anti-BDS laws and opposing AIPAC's influence on American politics. In 2026, Gaetz attacked other conservatives for "slavish loyalty to a country in a faraway land" in CPAC and condemned an incident where an Israeli soldier attacked a statue of Jesus in Lebanon as "horrific."

==== Niger ====
In March 2024, Niger announced it was ending its security relationship with the United States, which had been in place since 2012. In a report issued by Gaetz the following month, Gaetz stated that the United States embassy in Niger was suppressing information related to the decay of Niger-United States diplomatic relations. According to Gaetz's report, Niger has not authorized flights for United States Department of Defense efforts, including the sending of food, equipment, mail, or medical supplies.

==== Ukraine ====
In April 2024, Gaetz voted against the $60 billion military aid package for Ukraine, although much of the money would have gone to his constituency.

=== George Floyd protests ===
On June 1, 2020, during the nationwide George Floyd protests, Gaetz tweeted, "Now that we clearly see antifa as terrorists, can we hunt them down like we do those in the Middle East?" In response, Twitter hid the tweet and labeled it as "[violating] the Twitter Rules about glorifying violence". Gaetz called the label a "badge of honor", accused Twitter of enabling antifa, and again said that "[o]ur government should hunt [Antifa] down".

On August 26, 2020, Gaetz tweeted "The mob wants to destroy America. We need PATRIOTS who will defend her" in support of Kyle Rittenhouse, a 17-year-old from Antioch, Illinois, who traveled to Kenosha, Wisconsin, and shot and killed two people in self-defense during the protests of the Jacob Blake shooting. Gaetz was one of three representatives to offer Rittenhouse a Congressional internship.

=== Gun policy ===
Former National Rifle Association president Marion Hammer called Gaetz "one of the most pro-gun members to have ever served in the Florida Legislature". Gaetz is a lifetime member of the NRA, and has an A+ rating from it. When Gaetz served in the Florida House of Representatives, he led an unsuccessful effort to allow Floridians with concealed-weapons permits to carry those weapons openly in public. In lobbying for the bill, he said that the open carry of weapons was a right "granted not by government but by God". Gaetz supports Florida's stand-your-ground law and supported legislation that strengthened it against legal challenges. He also supports concealed carry reciprocity.

During a May 2021 "America First" rally with Marjorie Taylor Greene, Gaetz told an audience: "We have a Second Amendment in this country, and I think we have an obligation to use it!" He then said this meant allowing Americans "the ability to maintain an armed rebellion against the government if that becomes necessary". Immediately before his remarks on the Second Amendment, Gaetz criticized Big Tech companies for trying to "suppress us, discourage us", saying, "Silicon Valley can't cancel this movement, or this rally, or this congressman". As a result, politicians including Ted Lieu accused Gaetz of inciting violence against Silicon Valley employees, which Gaetz denied.

=== Health care ===
In October 2017, Gaetz argued that the Medicaid expansion permitted by the Affordable Care Act fueled the opioid crisis. PolitiFact rated the claim "mostly false", noting that "experts were universal in saying that the evidence that Medicaid expansion is somehow fueling the opioid crisis doesn't exist."

In June 2021, Gaetz introduced the Digital Health Pass Prevention Act (DHPPA), a bill aimed at preventing the federal government from funding and enforcing any digital passes associated with COVID-19 vaccination status, with the support of representatives Louie Gohmert and Lance Gooden. The full title of the bill is "To prohibit Federal funds from being used to implement, administer, enforce, or carry out programs with respect to digital health passes, and for other purposes." It was sent to the House Committee on Energy and Commerce which referred it to the Subcommittee on Health. No further action was reported.

==== COVID-19 ====
In early March 2020, Gaetz wore a gas mask during a House debate on funds to combat the COVID-19 pandemic. He argued that wearing the gas mask was not an act of mockery but a way of "demonstrating his concern". Several journalists characterized the decision as a stunt. A few days later, on March 9, Gaetz's office reported that he had been in contact with a Conservative Political Action Conference attendee who tested positive for COVID-19. As a result, Gaetz was placed under self-quarantine for 14 days. On March 10, he said his test was negative, but that he would stay under self-quarantine until the 14-day period ended on March 12.

On April 14, Gaetz said the Wuhan Institute of Virology "birthed a monster", a reference to the hypothesis that COVID-19 was leaked out of a Chinese research lab. He also stated that the National Institutes of Health had given the Institute a $3.7 million grant. The U.S.-based EcoHealth Alliance that worked with the Institute under a grant the Trump administration approved, eventually had that funding withdrawn. The EcoHealth Alliance later said that, under the grant, it had enhanced a bat coronavirus so it became potentially more infectious to humans, which the NIH said was an "unexpected result" of the research it had funded that was carried out in partnership with the Wuhan Institute. Nevertheless, the NIH denied it had helped create the virus that sparked the COVID-19 pandemic.

After Politico reported on November 7 that Gaetz had tested positive for COVID-19, he texted Politico "I have tested positive for antibodies" and "I have no live virus". He said he had no symptoms and was not sure when he had contracted the disease. On December 4, 2020, Gaetz attended an indoor New York Young Republicans Club conference in Jersey City, New Jersey, during a period of surging COVID-19 cases throughout the state and the country. He was seen posing for photos in a crowd of unmasked attendees, prompting New Jersey governor Phil Murphy and Jersey City mayor Steven Fulop to publicly condemn him. Gaetz and other GOP members mocked Democrats and their COVID-19 regulations on social media. Murphy also said state officials were investigating whether the event violated the state's COVID-19 regulations.

After a contentious House committee hearing on June 10, 2021, Gaetz said a Chinese whistle-blower possessed text messages and documents concerning COVID-19's origins that US government investigators had failed to pursue. On July 31, Gaetz said of COVID-19 variants that "next it'll be the Chi Omega variant or the Pi Kappa Psi variant. I got the Florida variant. I got the freedom variant. It affects the brain. It gets you to think for yourself where you don't just surrender to the truth that they're trying to create in corrupt big media."

==== Abortion ====
Gaetz opposes abortion. On July 23, 2022, he gave a speech at a Student Action Summit gathering in Tampa, Florida, in which he said that overweight or unattractive women were unlikely to become pregnant and mocked them for supporting abortion rights, saying, "They're like 5'2", 350 pounds, and they're like, 'Give me my abortions or I'll get up and march and protest.'" Olivia Julianna, a Texas teenager, tweeted a post mocking Gaetz, who responded with a photo of her that, according to NPR, implied his comments had touched a nerve; she used the incident to raise over $2 million for abortion funds.

=== Human trafficking ===
On December 19, 2017, Gaetz was the only representative to vote against the Combating Human Trafficking in Commercial Vehicles Act, a bill allocating additional government resources to help combat human trafficking. Gaetz later explained that his vote was due to his small government principles and his belief that existing federal agencies could adequately combat human trafficking.

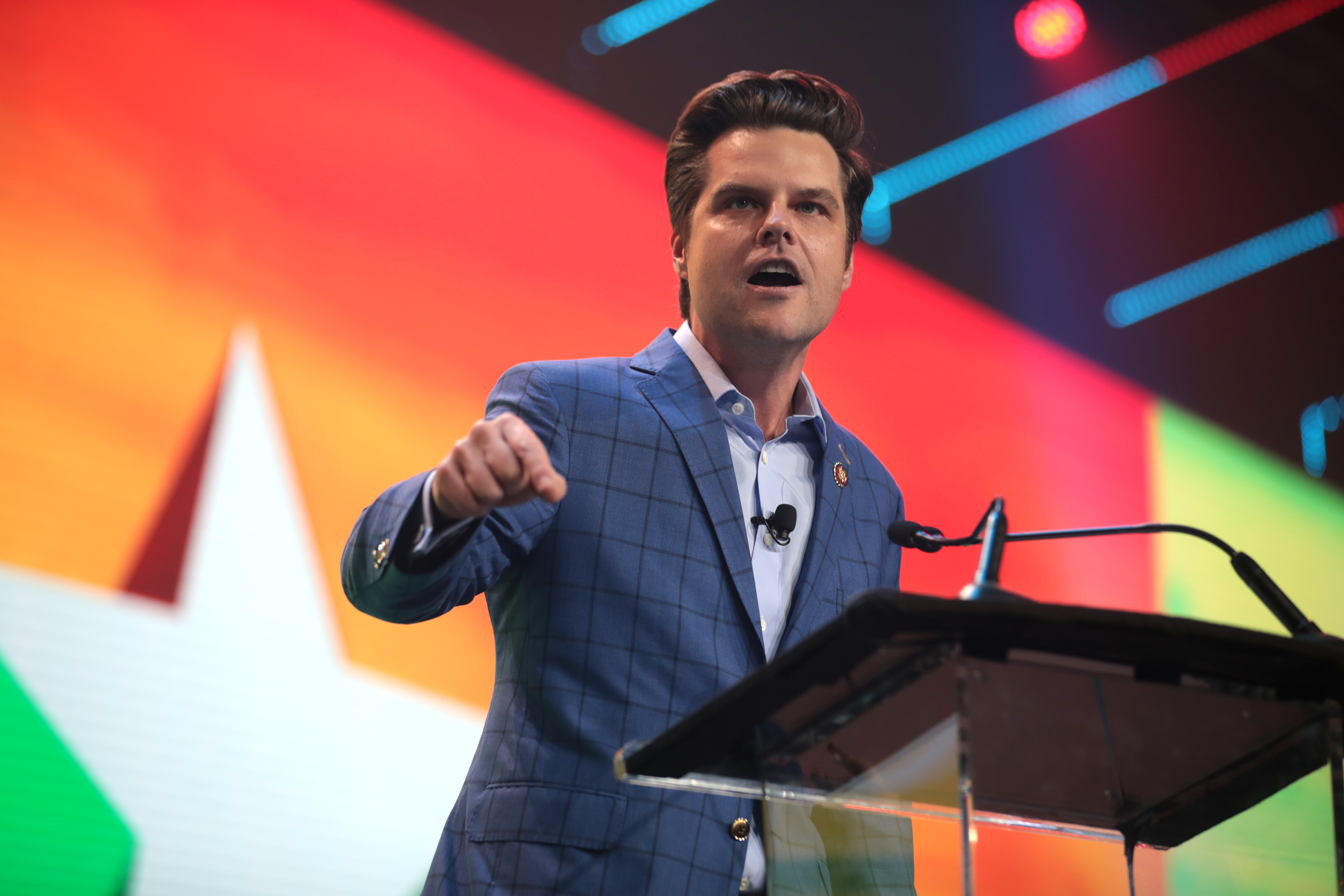
Gaetz speaking at a Turning Point USA event in West Palm Beach, Florida, 2020

On February 27, 2018, Gaetz voted against the Allow States and Victims to Fight Online Sex Trafficking Act, which had by then been combined with the Stop Enabling Sex Traffickers Act. It passed, 388–25. On July 26, 2022, Gaetz voted against the Frederick Douglass Trafficking Victims Prevention and Protection Reauthorization Act, which passed 401–20.

=== Immigration ===
Gaetz opposes sanctuary cities, which limit or deny their cooperation with the national government in enforcing immigration law. Upon announcing his run for Congress in 2016, he said that undocumented immigrants were "sucking us dry". In January 2018, Gaetz defended a statement by Trump that reportedly said Haiti and African nations were "shithole" countries, saying that Haiti was covered by "sheet metal and garbage" and in "disgusting" condition.

In October 2018, Gaetz falsely stated that George Soros paid for a caravan of migrants from Central America to the United States. Gaetz voted against the Further Consolidated Appropriations Act of 2020 which authorizes DHS to nearly double the available H-2B visas for the remainder of FY 2020. Gaetz voted against Consolidated Appropriations Act (H.R. 1158), an act which effectively prohibits ICE from cooperating with Health and Human Services to detain or remove illegal alien sponsors of unaccompanied alien children (UACs).

=== Law enforcement ===
Gaetz tweeted on June 23, 2021, that the FBI should be defunded. At that time, it was investigating him for alleged sex trafficking and having sex with a minor. He wrote, "If Democrats want to defund the police, they should start with the FBI." Gaetz later deleted the tweet. The week before, he claimed without evidence that "FBI operatives organized and participated in the January 6th Capitol riot." As of 2024, there is still no evidence for such a claim.

=== LGBTQ rights ===
As a Florida state representative in 2015, Gaetz and Representative David Richardson sponsored an amendment to repeal the state ban on same-sex adoptions. He also persuaded his father, in the Florida State Senate, to support the repeal. In 2015, after the U.S. Supreme Court decided Obergefell v. Hodges, which established the legal recognition of same-sex marriage in the United States, Gaetz said he disagreed with the court's ruling, saying that each state should have the right to decide for itself whether to allow same-sex marriage. He argued that the decision was an example of "judicial activism" that posed "a threat to our democracy".

During the 116th Congress, Gaetz voted against the Equality Act, which would ban discrimination on the basis of sex, sexual orientation, and gender identity in federal law. In 2022, Gaetz voted against the Respect for Marriage Act, which repealed the Defense of Marriage Act, which restricted legal recognition of marriage to opposite-sex marriage in federal law. In 2024, Gaetz condemned schools for promoting what he described as "degenerate LGBT and anti-White propaganda" as he introduced his "National Prayer In School Act".

=== Big tech ===
Gaetz was one of 39 Republicans to vote for the Merger Filing Fee Modernization Act of 2022, an antitrust package that would crack down on corporations for anti-competitive behavior.

== Legal issues and controversies ==
Gaetz's tenure as congressman was widely criticized and controversial, with The New York Times noting accusations of:

sexual misconduct and illicit drug use; sharing inappropriate images or videos on the House floor; misusing state identification records; converting campaign funds to personal use; and accepting impermissible gifts under House rules.

Gaetz routinely conflicted with members of Republican leadership. In October 2023, Gaetz filed a motion to vacate which led to the removal of Kevin McCarthy as speaker of the U.S. House of Representatives.

Former White House aide Cassidy Hutchinson wrote in her memoir that, during a trip to Camp David in 2020, Gaetz made "repeated passes" at her and asked her to "escort" him to his room. Gaetz has denied these actions.

=== Federal investigations into child sex trafficking and statutory rape ===
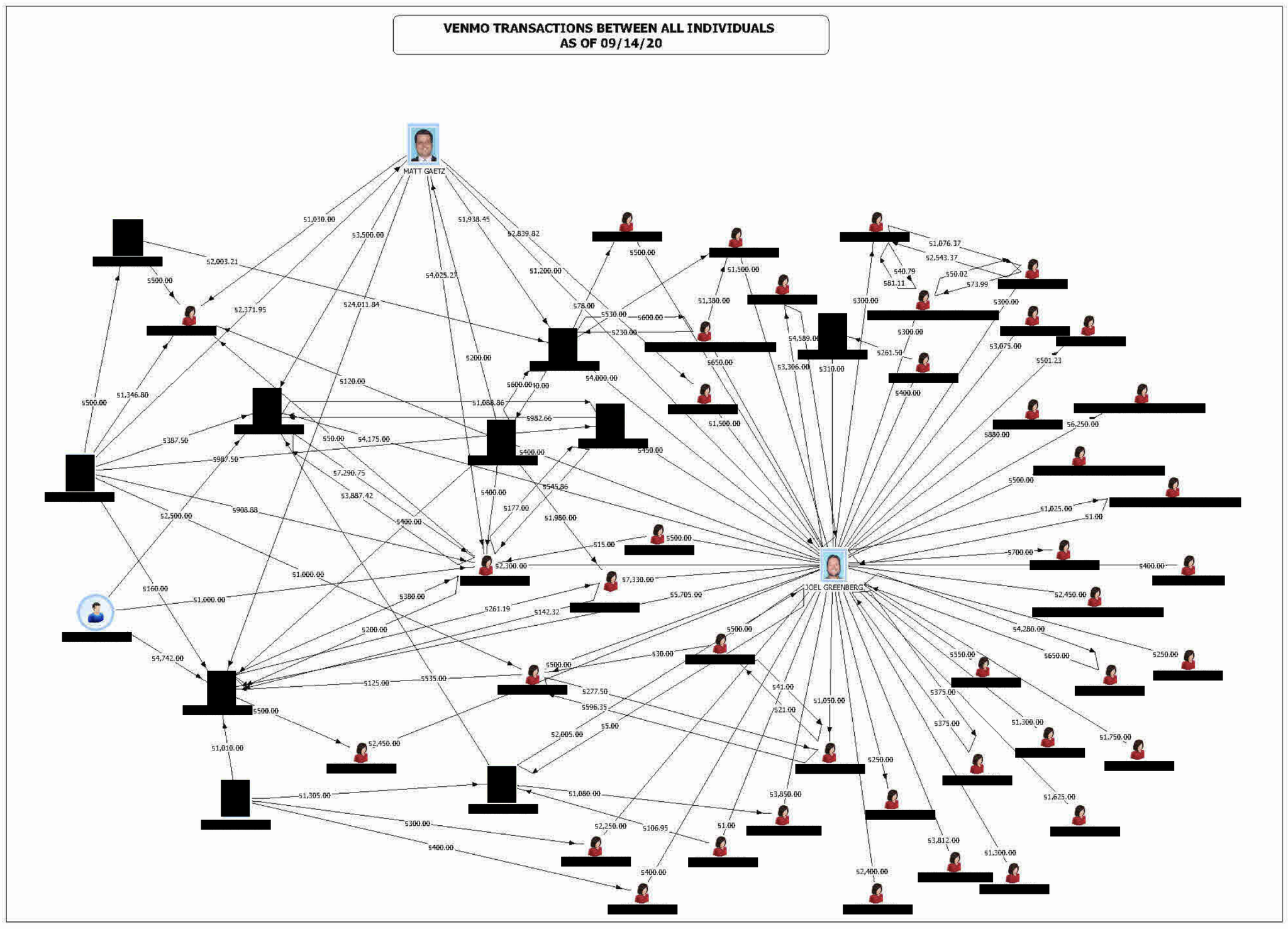
A chart of Venmo transactions produced by federal investigators at the Department of Justice

In January 2020, the U.S. Secret Service reportedly received a tip that, in April 2018, Gaetz had accompanied Seminole County tax collector Joel Greenberg to a government office where Greenberg was producing fake IDs. Greenberg was indicted in August 2020 on an array of charges, including sex trafficking a 17-year-old girl in 2017 and creating fake IDs to facilitate sex trafficking. The investigation of Greenberg led federal officials to look into some of Gaetz's related activities. In late 2020, the Justice Department opened its investigation of Gaetz for allegedly sex trafficking the same 17-year-old girl in 2017 and whether he had violated federal sex trafficking laws by paying her to travel with him across state lines. As part of his plea bargain, Greenberg cooperated with the investigation of Gaetz and others.

Axios reported that Gaetz was "seriously considering not seeking re-election and possibly leaving Congress early for a job at Newsmax" on March 30, 2021. The same day, The New York Times reported the Justice Department's investigation of Gaetz. According to CNN, a person briefed on the matter said investigators also examined whether Gaetz used campaign money in his relationships with young women for travel and expenses and whether cash and drugs were involved. By April 2, the Justice Department was examining whether Gaetz asked women to recruit others for sex.

According to the 2021 reports, federal investigators were looking into Gaetz's September 2018 trip to the Bahamas. Gaetz was reportedly joined by marijuana entrepreneur and hand surgeon Jason Pirozzolo, who allegedly paid trip accommodations, traveling expenses, and escort services. Investigators were reportedly exploring whether the escorts were sexually trafficked for Gaetz and whether Gaetz accepted paid escorts in exchange for political access or legislative favors for Pirozzolo, who at the time chaired the board of the Medical Marijuana Physicians Association. Gaetz made two speeches for the organization while in Congress, and Pirozzolo gave two separate donations of $1,000 to Gaetz's campaign arm, "Friends of Matt Gaetz", in March 2016 and May 2017. A spokeswoman for Gaetz denied the new allegations. A woman on the Bahamas trip—a Capitol Hill intern who did not work in Gaetz's office but who was dating him—reportedly agreed in May 2021 to cooperate with investigators, who believed she had information about Gaetz's financial transactions on the trip.

Investigators believe that Greenberg met women through a website for sex and introduced them to Gaetz, who also had sex with them. Evidence including mobile payment receipts reportedly suggesting Gaetz had illegally exchanged money for sex, such as May 2018 Venmo transaction records showing Gaetz sending $900 (with a memo referring to a woman) to Greenberg, who then relayed the money (with the memos "tuition" and "school") to three women, one of whom was 18. Joseph Ellicott, an associate of both Gaetz and Greenberg, pleaded guilty in January 2022 to two charges related to this investigation and is also cooperating with authorities.

Gaetz had argued in a November 2020 Fox News appearance that Trump "should pardon Michael Flynn [and] everyone from himself to his administration officials to Joe Exotic". In late 2020, Greenberg apparently attempted to secure a pardon from the Trump administration via a confession letter (first reported by The Daily Beast in April 2021), writing that he and Gaetz had had sex with a 17-year-old girl they believed was 19, which Greenberg learned of on September 4, 2017, and that payments had been made on behalf of Gaetz to her and other women in exchange for sex. Greenberg attempted to bribe Roger Stone with a $250,000 Bitcoin payment to secure a presidential pardon, texting Stone, "They know [Gaetz] paid me to pay the girls and that he and I both had sex with the girl who was underage." By the end of the Trump administration, Greenberg was under indictment, investigators had been questioning some Gaetz associates, and federal agents had seized the phone of one of Gaetz's former girlfriends. Gaetz's phone was also seized, and he changed his phone number in late December.

==== Defense and counter-claim of extortion ====
Denying any sexual relationships with minors, Gaetz said on March 30, 2021, that he did not plan to resign from the House. That same day, he tweeted that he and his family were "victims of an organized criminal extortion involving a former DOJ official seeking $25 million". This allegedly began on March 16, with a text message to his father demanding money in exchange for making sex trafficking allegations "go away". Gaetz and his father purportedly received communications saying that the FBI had photographs of Gaetz engaged in a "sexual orgy with underage prostitutes". The sender demanded millions of dollars to help secure the release of U.S. federal agent Robert Levinson (who had disappeared in Iran in 2007 and had already been presumed and declared dead), proposing that President Joe Biden would pardon Gaetz as a reward for freeing Levinson. The sender was later identified as Florida developer Stephen Alford, who was arrested on August 31.

Gaetz said his attorneys contacted the FBI, whom he said had informed them that Gaetz was a subject, not a target, of an investigation. He also said his father agreed to wear a "wire" to help the FBI record the alleged extortionists. Gaetz sent Axios screenshots of text messages, emails and documents outlining the alleged extortion scheme, which he asserted was being run by David McGee, a former federal prosecutor who has been a private attorney since 2005 and has represented the Levinson family. McGee's law firm called Gaetz's allegation "completely, totally false" and defamatory, telling The Daily Beast that Gaetz was attempting to distract from the sex trafficking investigation. Alford, who has previously been federally convicted of fraud and is represented by McGee, was federally indicted in August 2021 for allegedly conducting the scheme. Prosecutors alleged that Alford said he had contacts in the Justice Department who could arrange for a presidential pardon for Gaetz and directed Don Gaetz to wire the money to a trust account managed by McGee. McGee reportedly met with Don Gaetz before Alford did, but apparently did not discuss a presidential pardon, which Alford later admitted to the FBI that he had lied about his ability to arrange.

Also on March 30, Tucker Carlson interviewed Gaetz on Fox News. In addition to denying the allegations about his relationship with a 17-year-old girl, Gaetz denied a previously unreported claim that he had been photographed "with child prostitutes", and said that the FBI had urged a friend of his (whom Carlson had supposedly met) to claim Gaetz was "involved in some pay-for-play scheme". He also argued that "Providing for flights and hotel rooms for people that you're dating who are of legal age is not a crime."

==== Response and other developments ====
House Minority Leader Kevin McCarthy said he had no plans to remove Gaetz from his seats on the Judiciary and Armed Services Committees on March 31, 2021, but that he might change his mind if Gaetz "gets indicted" or "if it comes out to be true". CNN reported on April 1 that Gaetz had shown pictures of naked women to colleagues on the House floor. Gaetz had allegedly claimed to have slept with the women in the photos. The next day, his communications director, Luke Ball, and his legislative director, Devin Murphy, resigned. Both had begun working for Gaetz when he joined Congress in 2017.

On April 6, The New York Times reported that in the last weeks of the Trump administration, Gaetz privately requested a blanket presidential pardon for himself and others, which was reportedly denied because it would set a bad precedent. The next day, Trump publicly denied that Gaetz had asked him for a pardon. On April 7, journalist Maggie Haberman revealed on CNN that Trump had reportedly wanted to defend Gaetz but was told to stand down due to the seriousness of the allegations.

Gaetz's congressional office released a statement purportedly from his female employees vouching for his character, stating they "uniformly reject these allegations as false" on April 8. Gaetz's new communications director, Joel Valdez, told Forbes that "all of the office's eight female staffers signed it", but the version of the statement that was released did not have anyone's signature or identify any specific employee. That evening, Representative Adam Kinzinger tweeted that Gaetz should resign, becoming the first congressional Republican to make such a call.

The House Ethics Committee opened an investigation on April 9 into allegations that Gaetz "may have engaged in sexual misconduct and/or illicit drug use, shared inappropriate images or videos on the House floor, misused state identification records, converted campaign funds to personal use, and/or accepted a bribe, improper gratuity, or impermissible gift". The committee deferred its investigation at the request of the Justice Department, but resumed it in June 2023.

In late April, Gaetz fundraised to run his own political ads, claiming that he was under attack by powerful interests such as "big government, big tech, big business, big media" that perceived him as a political threat. A public relations firm hired by Gaetz issued a denial statement regarding The Daily Beast's reporting on Greenberg's correspondence implicating him and Gaetz. Greenberg pleaded guilty to multiple crimes on May 17 in a plea bargain in which he would have to cooperate with prosecutors.

By June, the federal investigation had reportedly broadened to include obstruction of justice, relating to Gaetz's phone conversation with a witness. Later in June, ABC News reported that the investigation had engulfed many in the Central Florida political scene and that prosecutors could decide whether to bring charges against Gaetz as early as July. In August, ABC News reported that Greenberg had "provided investigators with years of Venmo and Cash App transactions and thousands of photos and videos, as well as access to personal social media accounts". These include September 2018 text messages between Greenberg and a woman engaging in prostitution, which indicate that a prostitute was arranged for Gaetz and that MDMA may have been proffered. A spokesperson for Gaetz said, "not one woman has come forward to accuse Rep. Gaetz of wrongdoing" and that Gaetz had "addressed the debunked allegations against him" on his new podcast, Firebrand. According to Greenberg, he made the arrangements for Gaetz.

Two top Washington prosecutors—a public corruption investigator with expertise in child exploitation crimes and a leader of the public corruption unit—have worked on Gaetz's case since at least mid-2021. Greenberg's sentencing hearing was originally scheduled for August 2021, but due to his cooperation in related investigations, had been repeatedly delayed. In January 2022, an ex-girlfriend of Gaetz's testified before a grand jury after being granted immunity; she reportedly had information relevant to two of three criminal charges being considered for Gaetz: sex trafficking a minor and obstruction of justice. (A year later, her attorney said that Justice Department prosecutors made the right decision not to charge Gaetz because "they didn't have evidence to prove a crime".) Gaetz was also accused of violating the Mann Act, which prohibits sex trafficking across state lines. Later in January 2022, Joseph Ellicott confessed that on September 4, 2017, he witnessed Greenberg telling Gaetz over the phone that the woman they had both had sex with was underage.

Due to his assistance with the prosecutors in a series of investigations, including those involving Gaetz, Greenberg was sentenced to 11 years in prison, plus 10 years of supervised release, on December 1, 2022. The sentencing judge, Gregory A. Presnell, said, "He has provided substantial cooperation to the government...more than I've seen in 22 years." Court documents filed in September 2024 stated that, according to multiple eyewitnesses, Gaetz had attended a party in 2017 alongside a 17-year-old girl, at the home of lobbyist Chris Dorworth where people engaged in sexual activities and did drugs, including cocaine, ecstasy, and cannabis.

==== Conclusion of DOJ investigation ====
A September 2022 Washington Post article reported that prosecutors had recommended not to charge Gaetz in the sex trafficking investigation, telling Justice Department superiors that a conviction was unlikely in part because of credibility questions about the two central witnesses. In February 2023, the DOJ communicated to the attorneys for Gaetz that they had concluded their investigation and would not be laying charges against him, effectively ending a multiyear probe including allegations of misconduct.

==== Re-opening of investigation by House Ethics Committee ====
The House Ethics Committee began its probe in April 2021 into Gaetz's alleged misconduct but soon paused it while the DOJ investigated. Shortly after the February 2023 conclusion of the DOJ investigation, the House Ethics Committee reopened its probe. Two women, both represented by attorney Joel Leppard, testified that Gaetz paid them for sex. One of those women said that in July 2017, she saw Gaetz having sex with her 17-year-old friend and that once Gaetz became aware of the girl's age, he paused the relationship until she turned 18. The woman who was 17 at the time of the incident told the House Ethics Committee that she had two sexual encounters with Gaetz at the same party. The DOJ had charted payments showing that, between July 2017 and January 2019, Gaetz paid both women a total of over $10,000 across 27 Venmo transactions and a check. The committee received this chart from the DOJ, but the DOJ did not turn over other information the committee requested. The committee also contacted Gaetz's ex-girlfriend who in 2022 had received immunity and testified in the criminal investigation, though reportedly it did not expect her to cooperate in the ethics investigation voluntarily.

In mid-November 2024, days before the committee was scheduled to vote whether to release its report, which was nearly complete and which insiders said was "highly critical" of Gaetz, Gaetz resigned from the House, in part due to an announcement of his nomination as United States Attorney General for Donald Trump's second term. This caused the committee to lose jurisdiction to continue its probe and, under the House's own rules, it cannot release the report either. (Despite this internal rule, the House has released reports on former members before.) House Speaker Mike Johnson said he would "strongly request that the Ethics Committee not issue the report". Given the Senate's role in approving Gaetz's nomination for Attorney General, several senators including Joni Ernst, John Curtis, John Cornyn, and Markwayne Mullin called on the House to allow them to review the Ethics Committee report. Attorneys for the two women called for the report to be released publicly: John Clune (representing the woman who had been 17 at the time of the incident) and Joel Leppard (representing the witness).

The sworn testimony of the woman who said she had sex with Gaetz in 2017 when she was 17, along with corroborating eyewitness testimony to that sexual encounter, was obtained by a hacker on November 18. A lawyer on the case noticed the suspicious download. The hacker did not immediately leak the material.

The House Ethics Committee decided that by December 5, it would finish its report and vote on whether to release it. Gaetz withdrew his nomination for attorney general on November 21, and indicated the following day that he would not return to the House. The House Ethics Committee voted to release its report in December 2024. It was made public on December 23. The Ethics Committee report concluded that Gaetz had violated Florida state laws, including those prohibiting statutory rape, procurement of prostitution, and illicit drug use, but that he did not engage in sex trafficking across state lines. The committee identified at least 20 occasions in which Gaetz had paid women for sex or drugs. It found a total of over $90,000 in payments to the 17-year-old girl and 11 other women.

In 2026, two women filed a lawsuit against Gaetz, alleging sex trafficking.

=== Driving offenses ===
Gaetz was arrested for driving under the influence on his way back from a nightclub on Okaloosa Island, Florida, in 2008. Police recorded him driving 48 mph (77 km/h) in a 35 mph (56 km/h) zone and noted that he showed physical signs of intoxication. Gaetz initially denied that he had consumed alcohol, but later admitted to drinking two beers. He failed an eye test twice, then declined field sobriety tests. After Gaetz was arrested, he refused to take a breathalyzer test.

Shortly after Gaetz's case was referred to state attorney Steve Meadows, Gaetz's driver license was reinstated. Though Florida law requires a year's suspension when a driver refuses a breathalyzer test, Gaetz's suspension was less than a year. His refusal also did not lead to a criminal prosecution, during which it could have been used against him in court. A field officer for the Florida Department of Highway Safety and Motor Vehicles declared there was no evidence that Gaetz refused a breathalyzer test, despite the arresting police officer having documented it in an affidavit and the arrest report and Gaetz's own attorney also having documented it. Gaetz's attorney also argued that an unnamed witness who knew Gaetz "observed no indication of impairment". The charges against Gaetz were dismissed.

== Firebrand book and podcast ==
In 2020, Gaetz published a book and in 2021 a podcast, both titled Firebrand. In both, he criticizes former House speaker Paul Ryan for joining the board of Fox News's parent company and blames him for canceling Lou Dobbs Tonight. In the book, while discussing dating in Washington, he writes, "I knew going in how many people had been brought down by sexual missteps in this town, so I set some rules to help me err on the safe(r) side ... [including] no dating your staff members, [etc.]."

== Personal life ==
In December 2020, Gaetz announced his engagement to his girlfriend, Ginger Luckey, the sister of Anduril Industries founder and major Republican donor Palmer Luckey. They married in August 2021 and have a son together. Gaetz is a Baptist.

On several occasions, Gaetz has mentioned that he had regarded his ex-girlfriend's younger brother, Nestor Galbán, as his family. Though Gaetz has referred to Galbán as his son in the past, the two are not related genetically or legally.

== Footnotes ==
U.S. House of Representatives
Preceded by Jeff Miller	Member of the U.S. House of Representatives from Florida's 1st congressional district 2017–2024	Succeeded by Jimmy Patronis
U.S. order of precedence (ceremonial)
Preceded by Ted Yoho as Former U.S. Representative	Order of precedence of the United States as Former U.S. Representative	Succeeded by Tom Loeffler as Former U.S. Representative
