= Kingsley Wilson =

American spokeswoman (born 1998/1999)

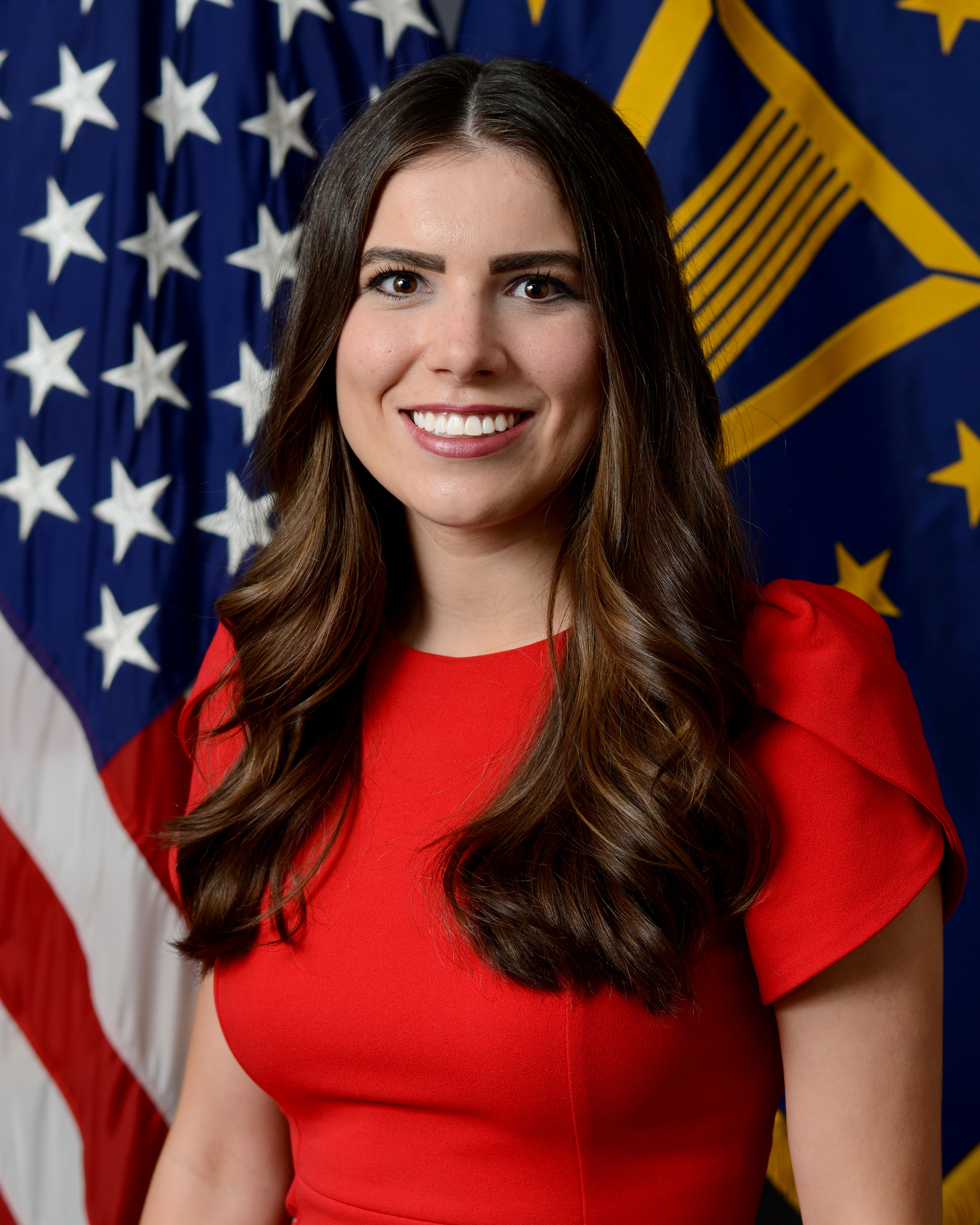
- Official portrait, 2025

United States Department of Defense Press Secretary
- Incumbent
- Assumed office May 27, 2025
- President: Donald Trump
- Preceded by: John Ullyot
- Acting
- In office April 24, 2025 – May 27, 2025
- President: Donald Trump
- Preceded by: John Ullyot
- Succeeded by: Joel Valdez

Deputy United States Department of Defense Press Secretary
- In office January 21, 2025 – May 27, 2025
- President: Donald Trump
- Press Secretary: Sean Parnell
- Preceded by: Sabrina Singh
- Succeeded by: Joel Valdez

Personal details
- Born: Kingsley R. Cortes; December 1998 (age 27)
- Party: Republican
- Education: University of California, Los Angeles

Kingsley R. Wilson (née Cortes; born 1998 or 1999) is an American spokeswoman who has served as the United States Department of Defense press secretary since May 2025. She served as the acting Department of Defense press secretary from April to May 2025 and the deputy Department of Defense press secretary from January to May 2025. Appointed at age 26, she is the youngest Pentagon press secretary in U.S. history.

== Early life ==
Kingsley R. Cortes was born in 1998 or 1999. Her father is Steve Cortes, a former advisor to Donald Trump and conservative commentator. Wilson earned a bachelor's degree in political science with a minor in classical studies from the University of California, Los Angeles.

== Career ==
=== Political career (2020–2025) ===
Wilson served as deputy to the senior advisor for strategy on President Trump's 2020 presidential campaign. She later worked for social media platform Gettr and led a "Make America Great Again takeover" of the Washington, D.C. Young Republicans by April 2023, later becoming its national committeewoman. By January 2025, Wilson had become the associate director of strategic communications and digital media at the Center for Renewing America.

=== Deputy Department of Defense press secretary (January–May 2025) ===
In January 2025, Wilson was named as the deputy Department of Defense press secretary. She garnered controversy for what her critics described as antisemitic comments made on X. In July 2025, Joel Valdez was appointed to succeed Wilson as her deputy press secretary.

=== Department of Defense press secretary (April 2025–present) ===
On April 24, 2025, Wilson became the acting Department of Defense press secretary, replacing John Ullyot. The department announced on May 23 that she would serve as press secretary. Her appointment at age 26 makes Wilson the youngest Pentagon press secretary in U.S. history.

== Views ==
Wilson has called for "zero immigration and mass deportations". She has stated that transgender people should not be allowed to own firearms and that they are not visible in a "healthy country". Several of Wilson's posts on X have criticized Republicans, including Florida governor Ron DeSantis and former speaker of the House Kevin McCarthy, in favor of Donald Trump. She stated that speaker of the House Mike Johnson lacked "testicular fortitude" and called for senator Lindsey Graham to be deported after he supported military aid to Ukraine.

In posts on X, Wilson has opposed U.S. military interventions, including military support for Israel and Ukraine. In July 2024, she referred to NATO as an "international HR department". In a One America News interview in 2023, Wilson called for Ukrainian president Volodymyr Zelenskyy to be arrested; conversely, she praised Vladimir Putin's "encyclopedic knowledge of his people's history" in Tucker Carlson's interview with Putin. Wilson has expressed support for Serbian nationalism. In 2024, she endorsed Alternative for Germany.

Wilson has repeated claims that Jewish lynching victim Leo Frank committed the murder of Mary Phagan; modern historians agree that Frank was wrongfully convicted. She has referred to George Floyd as a "career criminal", and has asserted that the Black Lives Matter movement has an "affinity for race-based violence". Wilson believes in the Great Replacement conspiracy theory.

== Works cited ==
- Cameron, Chris (May 23, 2025). "The Defense Department announced that Kingsley Wilson, the deputy press secretary who has drawn attention for past remarks criticized as antisemitic and racist, was promoted to be press secretary, the lead spokeswoman for the Pentagon". The New York Times.
- Detsch, Jack; Gould, Joe (March 5, 2025). "'Who's doing the vetting?': Republicans denounce Pentagon aide for antisemitic comments". Politico.
- Dreisbach, Tom (March 6, 2025). "A Pentagon press secretary has history of pushing antisemitic, extremist theories". NPR.
- Falconer, Rebecca (April 17, 2025). "Top Pentagon official announces resignation". Axios.
- Fandos, Nicholas (April 29, 2023). "George Santos, Instead of Shrinking From the Spotlight, Steps Into It". The New York Times.
- Hill, Evan (April 24, 2025). "Hegseth defended his Signal leak. Others lost clearances for similar lapses". The Washington Post.
- Gertz, Bill (January 21, 2025). "Pentagon swears in 32 new Trump appointees for top defense posts". The Washington Times.
- Leonard, Kimberly (July 26, 2025). "Playbook: 'The center of everything'". Politico.
- Merlan, Anna (March 5, 2025). "This Pentagon Press Secretary Has a Long History of Bigoted and Xenophobic Posts". Mother Jones.
- Radnofsky, Caroline; Gallion, Bryan; Sheeley, Colin (March 6, 2025). "DOD deputy press secretary has history of tweets with racist and antisemitic conspiracy theories". NBC News.
- Zucker, Andrew (February 4, 2026). "Trump 2.0's Baby-Faced Comms Squad Is Rewriting the Rules of Government Communication". Vanity Fair.
