= Burning Spear Society =

Secret society at Florida State University

- Founded: 1993; 33 years ago Florida State University
- Type: Secret
- Affiliation: Independent
- Status: Active
- Scope: Local
- Colors: Garnet and Gold
- Symbol: Flaming spear
- Chapters: 1
- Nickname: Burning Spear, Spear
- Headquarters: Tallahassee, Florida; United States
- Website: burningspear.org

The Burning Spear Society, commonly referred to as Burning Spear or Spear, is a secret society of students and alumni at Florida State University in Tallahassee, Florida, founded in 1993. Although little information is publicly available on the dealings of the organization, members have cited the provision of political, professional and financial support of student leaders and efforts that strengthen the public standing of Florida State University. While its membership and processes are closely guarded, it is believed that, in addition to notable alumni, students deemed influential from established campus organizations are tapped to join the ranks each semester, hailing from various factions of campus such as the Student Government Association, Greek Life Councils, the Student Alumni Association, Seminole Student Boosters, and the Garnet & Gold Key Honor Society.

== History ==
Burning Spear was founded on July 14, 1993, by three students, including Benjamin Crump. By August 1993, sixteen students joined to charter this new organization, and within one year's time seven additional students would be initiated into membership. The original intention of the group was to promote the Heisman campaign for Charlie Ward, which was successful. This newfound influence provided incentive to further and expand the goals of the organization.

== Symbols ==
Burning Spear Society's symbol is a flaming spear with sixteen feathers. Its colors are garnet and gold. The society's flowers in the orange blossom. Its members wear garnet colored jackets. Its nicknames are Burning Spear and Spear.

== Activities ==
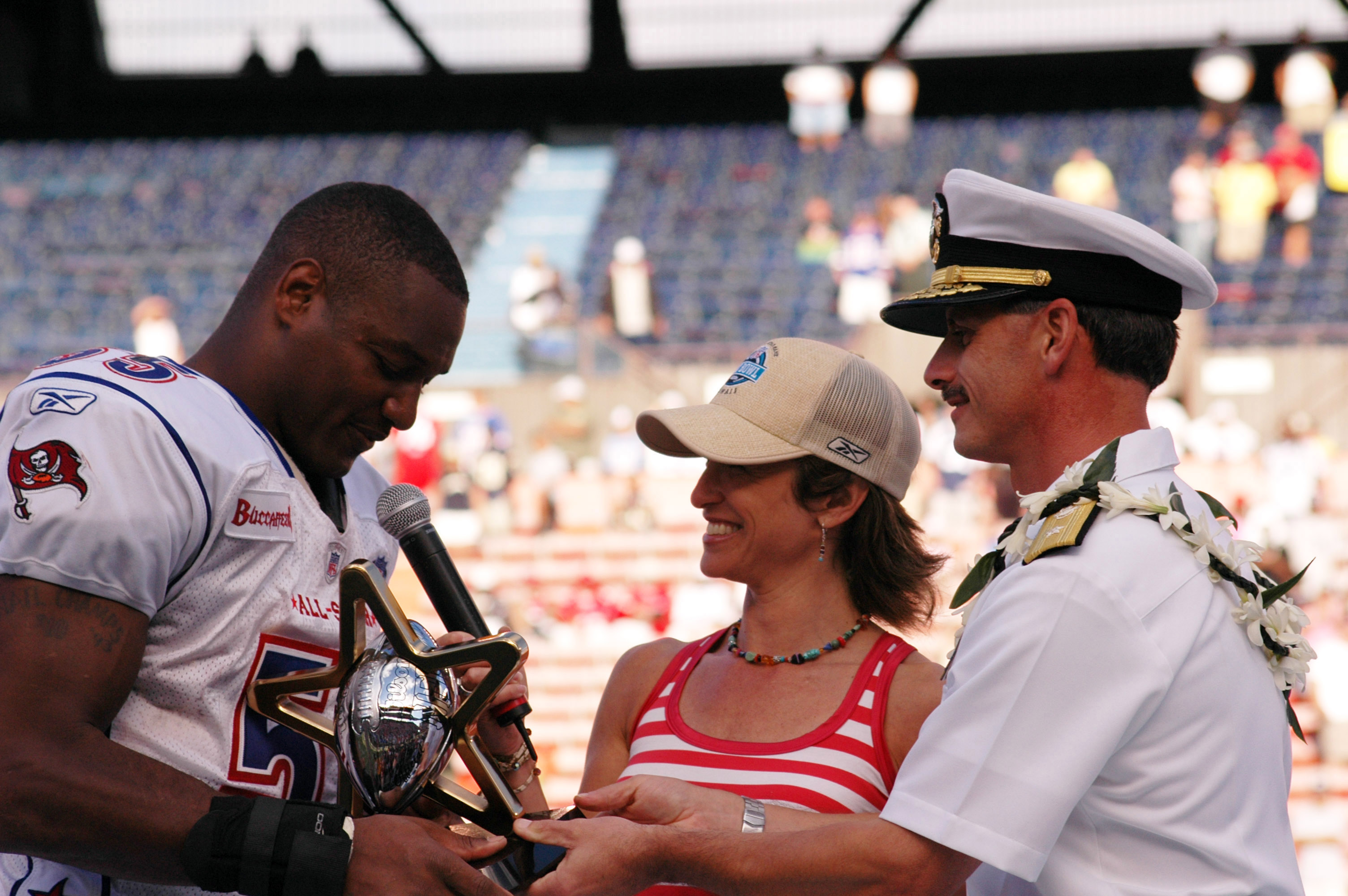
Derrick Brooks

Burning Spear serves as the host of the Clock & Seal annual homecoming banquet at FSU. Former keynote speakers of Clock & Seal include Senator Bill Nelson, Florida Supreme Court Justice Raoul Cantero, Super Bowl Champions Peter Boulware and Terrell Buckley, FSU All-American and NFL Super Bowl Champion XXXVI, Speakers of the Florida House Allan Bense and Raoul Cantero, Florida Governors Reubin Askew and Charlie Crist, and NFL All-Pros Derrick Brooks, and Marvin Jones.

Burning Spear coordinates the Burning Spear Drum Tour, during which the Seminole Spirit Drum is beaten nonstop outside of Doak Campbell Stadium for 72 hours prior to a football game against a major rival. This tradition started in the 1970s; it was discontinued in the 1980s but was reintroduced in 1993. The Drum Tour moves to other campuses before games against major opponents.

The organization is also responsible for the Guardian of the Flame Awards, recognizing faculty member excellence annually and helped coordinate FSU Head Football Coach Jimbo Fisher's Kidz 1st Fund.

== Notable members ==
Some of these notable members are listed below.

- Oscar Braynon – former Florida Senate minority leader, and former member of the Florida Senate's Seminole Caucus
- Benjamin Crump – civil rights attorney, representing high-profile cases such as the Trayvon Martin and George Floyd cases
- John Dailey – Mayor of Tallahassee and student body president (1995–1996)
- Matt Gaetz – United States House of Representatives for Florida's 1st congressional district

== Controversies ==
Burning Spear has claimed existence for only twenty-six years, but there are dissenting opinions that say the society has operated in one form or another for a much longer time.

There are a large number of Burning Spear alumni from Florida State now in the legislature and the organization is also said to control a political action committee that gives campaign contributions to candidates that attended Florida State. Multiple Student Government Association Political Party leaders have also openly claimed affiliation, including several elected Student Body Presidents.

=== Leaked organizational manual ===
A leaked manual titled "Spear Night Ceremony: Procedures for Conducting Spear Night.", appearing to have been updated as of 2013, which confirms that the Burning Spear Society has "multiple members currently serving public office" and "alumni involved on every level of state government." Additionally, the manual outlines the internal practices of the Society, and their dedication to secrecy, quoting in part;

"What is said here today, or in any other Burning Spear meeting is 100% secret... Breaking this vow of secrecy will result in your immediate removal and a potential lawsuit. Your friends, family, roommates, brothers/sisters and girl/boyfriends will not know when you are at a Burning Spear meeting. If they find out and we find out that they know, you will be removed, immediately and without question."

The manual also goes on to reference to Tenets of the Society, including "You will never ever speak against a fellow member of Burning Spear in public. Doing so will result in immediate removal.''
