= Steve Cortes =

American political commentator

- Born: January 5, 1972 (age 54); Chicago, Illinois, U.S.
- Education: Georgetown University
- Occupation: Political commentator
- Political party: Republican
- Spouse: Holly Cortes (after 1998)
- Children: 4

Steve Cortes (born January 5, 1972) is an American political commentator and former financial market strategist. He has worked as a broadcaster and contributor for several television networks, including CNBC, CNN, Fox News and Newsmax. Cortes served as a senior adviser and communications spokesman during Donald Trump’s 2016 and 2020 presidential campaigns, with a particular focus on Hispanic outreach.

He is the founder and president of the conservative advocacy organization League of American Workers and serves as a senior political adviser and spokesman for CatholicVote. He is also the author of Against the Herd (2011) and Bad Hombres (2024).

== Early life and education ==
Cortes grew up in Chicago, Illinois. His father emigrated from Colombia, and his mother is of Irish descent. He is one of six siblings and was raised by his mother.

Cortes earned a bachelor’s degree in government from Georgetown University in 1994. While at Georgetown, he was nominated for the Rhodes Scholarship and was named a George F. Baker Scholar. He also played defensive line on the university’s football team for three seasons.

== Career ==
=== Finance and market strategy ===
Cortes began his career in finance in 1994 as a government bond salesman at Prudential Financial. In 1998, he moved into independent trading in global government bond markets.

In 2002, he founded Veracruz TJM, a research and consulting firm providing real-time market analysis to institutional clients, including broker-dealers and hedge funds. He later served as chief strategist at BGC Partners, advising financial institutions on global markets and risk management.

=== Media and broadcasting ===
Cortes has worked as a cable news television commentator for fifteen years, contributing to several networks in addition to Fox News. He began his broadcasting career at CNBC, where he provided regular commentary on financial markets. He was a frequent contributor to the Fast Money franchise and co-hosted the Fast Money Halftime Report.

Cortes has also worked as an on-air broadcaster and political commentator for CNN. In 2021, he joined Newsmax to co-host a primetime program.

He previously hosted The Steve Cortes Show on AM 560 The Answer, a conservative talk radio station. He temporarily left the program in July 2020 to join Donald Trump's re-election campaign and returned to the show in early November following the election. Cortes currently hosts The Steve Cortes Show on YouTube.

His written commentary has appeared in publications such as RealClearPolitics and Human Events. In addition to his television and radio work, he has produced and released short-form documentaries, typically around 20 minutes in length, covering topics such as undocumented immigration in Arizona and criticisms of wind energy projects, referred to as the “wind scam”.

=== Political and advocacy ===
Cortes served as a senior adviser, communications spokesman, and media surrogate for Donald Trump’s presidential campaigns in 2016 and 2020. During both campaigns, he led Hispanic outreach efforts and served on the campaign’s Hispanic Advisory Council. He was also appointed to the White House Commission on Hispanic Prosperity.

In 2022, Cortes served as a senior media adviser for JD Vance’s successful U.S. Senate campaign in Ohio.

In 2023, he became national spokesman for Never Back Down, a super PAC supporting the presidential campaign of Florida governor Ron DeSantis. He later resigned from that position and publicly endorsed Donald Trump.

In 2022, Cortes founded the League of American Workers, a conservative advocacy organization focused on labor and economic policy. He serves as the organization’s president.

In February 2025, Cortes joined CatholicVote as a senior political adviser and spokesman.

Cortes is the author of Bad Hombres: How Hispanics Will Save America (2024), which examines political trends among Hispanic voters in the United States.

In December 2025, the League of American Workers, an organization he founded, released a national poll of Gen Z voters that Cortes described as providing insight into emerging political attitudes among young Americans.

Cortes has continued to comment publicly on immigration and political strategy in national media, including written debates and opinion pieces in outlets such as Newsweek, where he has addressed topics like immigration policy and U.S. foreign aid.

In late 2025, Cortes publicly expressed criticism of aspects of the Republican Party’s approach to immigration, characterizing some positions as out of step with the “America First” agenda.

Departure from Newsmax

In late 2021, Cortes left Newsmax following a dispute related to the network’s COVID-19 vaccination policy, which he publicly opposed. Multiple media outlets reported that his departure was connected to his refusal to comply with the network’s vaccination requirements.

== Political views and public commentary ==
Cortes has frequently expressed views on immigration policy, border security, and economic issues in his public commentary. He has characterized the Biden administration’s border policies as effectively creating an open border and argued that this has economic and social consequences for U.S. workers, maintaining that increased illegal immigration depresses wages and strains public services.

Cortes has also argued that U.S. policy under President Joe Biden prioritizes foreign interests over domestic concerns, including federal spending on foreign aid and migration enforcement, and has called for stronger border security and deportation measures.

On economic policy, Cortes has advocated for measures aimed at supporting working-class Americans and has supported tariffs and economic strategies intended to protect domestic industries and employment.

In commentary on voting patterns and political strategy, he has emphasized the importance of economic opportunity and security issues in shaping Hispanic voter preferences and argued that Republican candidates can appeal to these voters by focusing on economic growth and border policy.

Cortes has also acknowledged a past choice of language around immigration that he later revised, noting in a previous interview that he regretted describing undocumented entrants as “invaders” and clarified his support for distinguishing between legal and illegal immigration.

== Personal life ==
He married Holly Cortes in 1998. She has served on the Women's Board of Northwestern Memorial Hospital since 2012 and previously held the position of president.

The couple has four children. Their daughter, Kingsley Wilson, was appointed deputy press secretary at the Pentagon in January 2025 during the Trump administration and previously served as the national committeewoman for the DC Young Republicans.
