= Joel Greenberg (politician) =

American politician and convicted child sex-trafficker (born 1984)

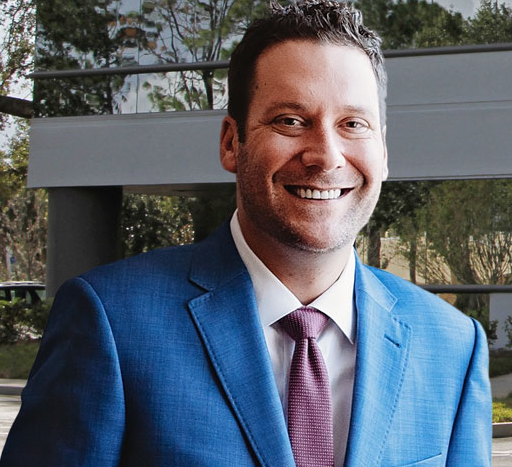

Tax collector of Seminole County
- In office January 3, 2017 – June 24, 2020
- Preceded by: Ray Valdes
- Succeeded by: J.R. Kroll

Personal details
- Born: February 4, 1984 (age 42) Altamonte Springs, Florida, U.S.
- Party: Republican
- Spouse: Abby Greenberg (m. 2016; div. 2022)
- Children: 2
- Education: Rollins College (did not graduate)
- Criminal information
- Status: Incarcerated
- Convictions: Sex trafficking of a child; Production of a false identification document; Aggravated identity theft; Wire fraud; Stalking; Conspiracy
- Penalty: 11 years in prison

Details
- Date apprehended: June 23, 2020
- Imprisoned at: Federal Correctional Institution, Miami

Joel Micah Greenberg (born February 4, 1984) is an American politician and former tax collector of Seminole County, Florida. He is a convicted felon eligible for release in July, 2033 from the minimum security prison in Miami, Florida. In 2020, Greenberg was arrested and charged with multiple federal offenses. He was indicted on 33 criminal counts: theft, stalking, sex trafficking, cryptocurrency fraud, and Small Business Administration loan fraud. On May 17, 2021, he pleaded guilty to six federal charges, including sex trafficking of a minor, as part of a plea deal.

Greenberg was formerly seen together with Republican congressman Matt Gaetz; after being arrested in 2020, Greenberg began to cooperate with federal investigators probing Gaetz and negotiated a plea agreement.

== Early life ==
Joel Greenberg is the son of Andrew Greenberg, a dentist and founder of Greenberg Dental, a chain of over 90 dental clinics throughout Florida. Greenberg's father is Jewish. Greenberg was raised in a Christian family and attended a Christian church. As an adult, Greenberg has identified himself as being Jewish. Greenberg married his wife, Abby, in 2016 and has a son and a daughter. He suffered early academic and behavioral difficulties (including attention deficit disorder and Tourette's syndrome), and as a result of these challenges was enrolled at Florida Air Academy (now Florida Preparatory Academy), a military-themed boarding school in Melbourne, Florida. He also participated in a mentorship program run by then-Orlando Magic basketball player John Amaechi.

Greenberg attended Rollins College, a liberal arts college in Florida, but did not graduate. He subsequently wrote several freelance sports pieces for the Orlando Sentinel and later hosted a sports talk show, The Joel Greenberg Show, on Yahoo Sports Radio Orlando. He eventually formed an advertising agency, DG3 Media Group, which specialized in outdoor, radio, and digital ads. The venture was a success; by the time Greenberg sold DG3 in 2015 it had the biggest growth of any company in Central Florida, according to an annual list published by Inc., having reported $8 million in revenue during the previous year. He also formed DG3 Network, which was inactive until Greenberg filed paperwork with the state to revive it just days after his arrest in June 2020. Federal authorities later alleged the company had been used to obtain fraudulent loans through a program put in place to help small businesses hurt by the COVID-19 pandemic; this eventually led to additional criminal charges against Greenberg, including bribery of a public official.

== Political career ==
In 2016, Greenberg was elected tax collector of Seminole County, Florida, after running a reportedly self-funded campaign. He defeated incumbent Ray Valdes, who had held the office for 30 years. He took office in January 2017.

Greenberg was once described as a Republican star in Central Florida politics.

Greenberg resigned from his office on June 24, 2020.

== Criminal charges ==
Greenberg is accused of stealing $400,000 of public funds and sex trafficking. The government alleges that since 2017 he has used the state's driver license system to obtain names of minors for "commercial sex acts", and also created fake IDs to facilitate sex trafficking. Some of this money was funneled through a private company he created and ran from government buildings, called Government Blockchain Systems LLC. At one point the $90,000 server room running the cryptocurrency operation overloaded the electricity supply, causing $6,700 in uninsured fire damage. He also bought memorabilia and other items.

Over the course of Greenberg's employment as a tax collector, he was reported to have spent over $1 million on contracts and other purchases. Those contracts included $380,000 for body armor, weapons, and ammunition, as well as $15,000 for office sprinklers that could be aimed at people outside his office.

During the reelection campaign in 2019, he is also alleged to have created fake Facebook accounts and sent falsified letters making claims of sexual misconduct against an opponent, and impersonated a law enforcement officer on two separate occasions, to stop a woman while driving, and to try to evade a speeding ticket himself.

Federal agents arrested Greenberg at his home on June 23, 2020; he resigned the following day after being released on bail. The original June 2020 indictment charged Greenberg with identity theft and stalking. In August 2020, one count of sex trafficking a 17-year-old girl in 2017 was added to the indictment. On February 28, 2021, Greenberg violated his bond conditions by traveling during his curfew hours, reportedly to look for his wife. His bond was revoked on March 3, 2021, and a federal judge denied Greenberg a new bail, ordering him into custody for the remainder of the case. By the end of that March, the Justice Department added an additional 21 criminal charges to Greenberg's indictment, including cryptocurrency fraud, SBA loan fraud (allegedly receiving fraudulent Economic Injury Disaster Loans for two defunct corporations), wire fraud, conspiracy to bribe a public official and theft of government property. Greenberg faced a minimum of 12 years imprisonment and a maximum term of life imprisonment.

=== Plea deal and cooperation ===
After being arrested in 2020, Greenberg began to cooperate with federal investigators probing Gaetz, who was also implicated in the sex trafficking scandal, although he has not been charged with a crime. In April 2021, Greenberg's attorney announced that his client planned to plead guilty as part of a plea agreement with the government to avoid a possible life sentence. On May 17, 2021, Greenberg pleaded guilty to six federal charges: sex trafficking of a child, production of a false identification document, aggravated identity theft, wire fraud, stalking, and conspiracy. As part of a plea deal, he agreed to cooperate with the U.S. Department of Justice in an ongoing investigation, and will serve a 12-year sentence, the minimum sentence allowed by law. In exchange for his cooperation, prosecutors agreed to drop the remaining charges from the original indictment. The plea agreement documents state that Greenberg paid a minor to have sex with him and other men. He engaged in sex acts with a minor at least seven times while she was underage. In court papers for his plea deal, Greenberg did not implicate others by name but admitted that he "introduced the minor to other adult men, who engaged in commercial sex acts". As part of the plea agreement, Greenberg must register as a sex offender.

Federal judge Gregory Presnell accepted Greenberg's plea agreement on June 3, 2021, and scheduled a sentencing hearing for August 19. On July 6, Greenberg requested, and prosecutors agreed to, a three-month delay in his sentencing so he could further cooperate with the government; presiding federal judge Gregory Presnell agreed to reschedule the sentencing date to November 18. By early October, a lawyer for Greenberg had asked for another delay, this time to March 2022. On October 18, prosecutors also asked Presnell for the extension, stating that Greenberg was a "prolific criminal" who had made allegations that "take us to some places we did not anticipate." Presnell approved the extension. On February 14, 2022, Presnell granted a third delay, this time to May 2022, saying it appeared to be "in the interest of justice". A fourth delay was granted in May, with sentencing likely in August. Subsequently, a December sentencing date was set.

Greenberg was sentenced on Thursday, December 1, 2022, by a federal judge to 11 years in prison.
