= VITAS Healthcare =

American end-of-life care provider

- Type: Subsidiary
- Industry: Healthcare; Hospice Care; Palliative Care
- Founded: 1978; 48 years ago
- Founders: Hugh Westbrook, Esther Colliflower, Don Gaetz
- Headquarters: Miramar, FL, United States
- Key people: Joel Wherley (President & CEO); Kevin J. McNamara (President & CEO, Chemed Corporation)
- Number of employees: 12,000
- Parent: Chemed Corporation
- Website: VITAS Helathcare

VITAS Healthcare is an American provider of hospice and palliative care. Operating 60 hospice programs in 15 states and the District of Columbia, VITAS employs over 12,000 people and has an average daily census of more than 24,000 patients, according to the company's website. VITAS provides care primarily in patients' homes, as well as in inpatient hospice units and through partnerships with hospitals, nursing homes, and assisted living communities.

VITAS is a subsidiary of publicly traded Chemed Corporation (NYSE:CHE).

== Company overview ==
VITAS (pronounced VEE-tahs) offers hospice and palliative care services to patients across the U.S., provided by its interdisciplinary care teams, which consist of a physician, registered nurse, home health aide, social worker, chaplain, volunteer, and bereavement specialist. With 48 years of experience in hospice care, VITAS is the largest single-source provider of end-of-life care in the U.S. and works in cooperation with hospitals, physicians, nursing homes, assisted living communities, insurers, and community-based organizations throughout the country.

VITAS operates in Alabama, California, Connecticut, Delaware, Florida, Georgia, Illinois, Kansas, Missouri, New Jersey, Ohio, Pennsylvania, Texas, Virginia, and Wisconsin, and also the District of Columbia.

The organization also supplies home medical equipment and medications to patients while offering spiritual and emotional counseling to patients and their families. These therapeutic services include veterans care, music therapy, bereavement support, pet visits, and intensive comfort care.

The name VITAS is derived from the Latin word for "lives."

== History ==
VITAS began in 1978 as a nonprofit hospice in South Florida, founded in part by Hugh Westbrook, a Methodist minister, and Esther Colliflower, a nurse.

Their first patient was Emmy Philhour. The organization then became known as Hospice Care Inc, and eventually, VITAS Healthcare.

In 1979, Florida became the first state to have a hospice licensure law. Westbrook and another VITAS founder, Don Gaetz, played a crucial role in passing the Hospice Care Reimbursement Act in 1982 that made hospice a Medicare benefit.

The company changed its name to VITAS Innovative Hospice Care in the early 1990s. The name draws on the Latin word "vitas," meaning "lives," and reflects the company's mission to preserve the quality of life for those with a limited time to live.

VITAS also played a significant role in providing patient care and developing HIV/AIDS treatment protocols during the AIDS crisis of the 1980s and 1990s, a period when patients with the disease faced widespread rejection, stigma and fear. In Miami, VITAS was the only hospice offering dedicated care teams for AIDS patients.

In 2000, VITAS founder Hugh A. Westbrook donated $13.5 million to Duke University to create the National Institute on Care at the End of Life, established to advance education, research and caregiving for the terminally ill.

In 2004, VITAS was acquired by Cincinnati-based Chemed for $400 million. Timothy S. O'Toole was chief executive officer (CEO) from 2004 when Chemed purchased VITAS until his retirement in June 2016. Nicholas M. Westfall was appointed CEO in 2016 and named chairman and CEO in 2024 before stepping down in July 2025.

In July 2025, Joel L. Wherley, who was president and chief operating officer (COO), was appointed president and CEO, succeeding Nick Westfall. Wherley joined VITAS in 2016 as senior vice president of operations and was promoted to executive vice president and COO in 2017 and again in 2024 to president and COO.

== Healthcare technology ==
In August 2026, VITAS Healthcare launched an improved mobile app to make hospice referrals easier and give healthcare professionals, patients, and families better access to reliable hospice care resources. The app brings together referral tools, eligibility guidelines, and educational materials in one place. Clinicians can use it to send secure hospice referrals from their phones and track the status in real time. It also offers tools to help professionals identify patients who may benefit from hospice care earlier and provides families, caregivers, and patients with clear information created by VITAS clinicians.

In 2021, VITAS Healthcare launched Emmy, a suite of Microsoft Power Platform apps nested in Teams. Named in honor of VITAS's first hospice patient, Emmy Philhour, this digital platform centralizes clinician scheduling and patient care coordination, cutting managers' scheduling time from hours to minutes.

In March 2020, VITAS Healthcare became the first hospice provider to connect to FirstNet, AT&T's nationwide broadband network for public safety. This connection provides field clinicians with a secure, dedicated network and priority access during emergencies and natural disasters.

In February 2019, VITAS Healthcare and AT&T announced a study to see if combining 5G with virtual and augmented reality could help reduce chronic pain and anxiety for some hospice patients. The study began in January 2019 at a well-known cancer center in Southern California. Participants used headsets to experience calming scenes, like walking through a field by a quiet stream or visiting Machu Picchu.

In April 2015, VITAS was part of a technology roll-out with HealthGrid that enables clinicians to exchange critical patient-care data quickly and securely with other care providers. The same technology helps healthcare providers meet one rule of CMS Meaningful Use Phase 2, which states that data for 10 percent of patients must be transmitted electronically.

== Department of Justice lawsuit ==
In 2013, the U.S. Department of Justice filed a lawsuit against Chemed Corporation, Vitas Hospice Services LLC, and Vitas Healthcare Corporation for the submission of false claims from 2002 through 2013. "The government’s complaint alleges that Chemed and Vitas Hospice knowingly submitted or caused the submission of false claims to Medicare for crisis care services that were not necessary, not actually provided, or not performed in accordance with Medicare requirements." In 2017, the organization agreed to pay $75 million to settle the lawsuit. Acting Assistant Attorney General Chad A. Readler of the Justice Department's Civil Division stated that the "resolution represents the largest amount ever recovered under the False Claims Act from a provider of hospice services."

== Corporate headquarters ==
VITAS Healthcare is headquartered in Miramar, Florida. The company has been a tenant at the Miramar Park of Commerce since 1995, and began transitioning its corporate offices there in 2017.

By the mid-2020s, all operations had been consolidated at the Miramar campus. As of 2025, VITAS occupies 167,819 square feet across multiple buildings in the Park, with the official headquarter location at 3046 Corporate Way.

Prior to the Miramar consolidation, VITAS maintained its headquarters in downtown Miami. The company was a long-time anchor tenant at Bayfront Plaza, 100 South Biscayne Boulevard.

In 2013, the company leased an additional 23,500 square feet at the Miami Center at 201 South Biscayne Boulevard. The former VITAS Tower at 100 South Biscayne Boulevard was vacated and demolition of the 19-story, circa-1959 structure began in 2025. The site is slated for redevelopment as One Bayfront Plaza, a planned supertall tower rising 1,049 feet that would become the tallest building in Florida.

== Awards and recognition ==
VITAS Healthcare joined the list of 2026 Top Workplaces and has been recognized as a Top Workplace in the healthcare industry since 2025.

In 2024, VITAS received the Advancing Health Equity Daisy Award presented by the American Association for Men in Nursing (AAMN)'s 49th annual conference in October. In July, VITAS was the inaugural recipient of the 2024 Founders Spirit Award given by the National Black Nurses Association at its 52nd Annual Institute and Conference. In May, the company received the Health Value Award for Employee Engagement presented by the Validation Institute at The Healthcare Innovation Congress in Washington, D.C.

In 2023, the VITAS Inpatient Unit of Orange County was awarded 2nd place in the hospice category for the Architecture & Design Awards presented by Senior Housing News in December. Also in December, VITAS Healthcare was awarded the 2023 HRO Today Association Awards for Best in Class: Employee Experience and was a finalist for both Best in Class: HR Technology and HR Team of the Year. In November, VITAS was named in the list of Top 25 Companies in Miami for 2023 by The Business Report. In January, VITAS received the inaugural Corporate Roundtable Award from the National Black Nurses Association (NBNA) during the 35th annual NBNA Day on Capitol Hill.

Awards

2025/26 – Top Workplaces, Energage

2024 – Founders Spirit Award, National Black Nurses Association

2024 – Advancing Health Equity Daisy Award, American Association for Men in Nursing

2024 – Health Value Award for Employee Engagement, Validation Institute

2023 – Corporate Roundtable Award, National Black Nurses Association

2022 – IDEA (Inclusion & Diversity Excellence) Award, American Association for Men in Nursing

2020 – Best Social Impact and Agency Expertise, MUX19 AWARDS

2019 – 16 Aster Awards for healthcare advertising excellence

2018 – American Academy of Hospice and Palliative Medicine Josefina B. Magno Distinguished Hospice Physician Award (Dr. Joel S. Policzer)

2014 – President's Lifetime Achievement Award, Minority Chamber of Commerce

2011 – Silver Crown Award in Hospice/Palliative Care, Dorland Health
