= Joel Valdez =

American spokesman (born 1999)

- Official portrait, 2025

United States Department of Defense Press Secretary
- Acting
- In office May 1, 2026 – August 24, 2026
- President: Donald Trump
- Preceded by: Kingsley Wilson
- Succeeded by: Himself

Deputy United States Department of Defense Press Secretary
- Incumbent
- Assumed office June 20, 2025
- President: Donald Trump
- Secretary: Pete Hegseth
- Preceded by: Kingsley Wilson

Personal details
- Born: Joel Manuel Valdez; February 22, 1999 (age 27) Chicago, Illinois, U.S.
- Party: Republican
- Education: University of Illinois at Urbana-Champaign

Joel Manuel Valdez (born February 22, 1999) is an American spokesman who has served as the United States Department of Defense deputy press secretary since June 2025. He served as the Department of Defense acting press secretary from May 2026 to August 2026. Prior to joining the second administration of President Donald Trump, he previously served as a communications director and senior advisor in the U.S. House of Representatives for U.S. Representative Lauren Boebert and former U.S. Representative Matt Gaetz.

== Early life ==
Joel Manuel Valdez was born on February 22, 1999, in Chicago, Illinois. In 2017, Valdez enrolled at the University of Illinois at Urbana-Champaign. He was the activism chairman for the UIUC chapter of Turning Point USA. While reporting on a local protest of President Donald Trump's first year in office for Campus Reform, Valdez was allegedly assaulted by a University of Illinois faculty member who was participating in the protest, and the faculty member was later arrested. Andrew Minik, a student who was not present at the rally, subsequently published an article about the confrontation. In response, the university issued "No Contact Directives" to Valdez and Minik regarding the faculty member. Minik was explicitly told the order stemmed from his article and that he should stop writing about the arrested faculty member if he wanted "the situation to improve."

In 2018, Valdez, Minik, and another student filed a federal lawsuit against the university and its officials. The plaintiffs alleged that the no-contact directives and the university’s broader bias-reporting and speech-restriction policies violated their First Amendment rights to free speech and press, as well as Fourteenth Amendment due process rights, by punishing protected journalism and political expression without adequate procedural safeguards. Valdez and the plaintiffs settled the lawsuit with the university out of court in December 2019.

Valdez’s lawsuit was highlighted in 2019 when he and his plaintiffs were invited to The White House to stand alongside President Trump as he signed an executive order demanding that public universities abide by free speech and the First Amendment or have their federal funding stripped.

== Career ==
=== Early political career ===
In February 2020, Valdez joined President Trump's 2020 presidential campaign as a War Room Analyst at the campaign's headquarters in Arlington, Virginia. Valdez joined the office of then Congressman Matt Gaetz later that year and was promoted to Communications Director in 2021. By September 2024, Valdez was hired by the office of Congresswoman Lauren Boebert as a senior advisor. During his time in the U.S. House of Representatives, Valdez also served as vice chairman of communications for the Washington, D.C., Young Republicans Club for two years.

=== 2021 storming of the United States Capitol ===
On January 6, 2021, hours before the storming of the United States Capitol commenced, Valdez posted a 5-second video to Parler with the caption, "From the top of the Capitol office buildings, WE HEAR YOU LOUD AND CLEAR! #StopTheSteal". Gaetz’s chief of staff defended Valdez, saying, "A staff member in our office posted on his personal Parlor [sic] account about the President’s rally before the Capitol had been breached or anyone was harmed. He also immediately amplified President Trump’s call on social media for those in attendance to go home. He regrets that the post has been misinterpreted as support for violence by some. It was not."

=== Congressional campaign manager (2024) ===
In May 2024, Congressman Matt Gaetz hired Valdez to run his congressional re-election campaign, briefly stepping away from his role as communications director in Gaetz’s Washington, D.C. office. National pundits closely watched the campaign after Kevin McCarthy, whom Gaetz removed from the position of Speaker of the House after filing a motion to vacate, vowed to engage in a "revenge tour" against those who voted to remove him from the speakership. In August 2024, Gaetz defeated the McCarthy-backed challenger Aaron Dimmock, earning 73% of the Republican primary vote in Florida’s first congressional district. Gaetz called his victory under Valdez's management his "biggest win ever."

== Department of Defense Spokesman (2025-present) ==
=== Deputy Department of Defense Press Secretary (June 2025-Present) ===
In June 2025, Valdez was appointed by the Trump administration as deputy Department of Defense press secretary. Kingsley Wilson previously held the post before her promotion to press secretary. Many conservative figures and politicians praised the appointment of Valdez, including former U.S. Representative Matt Gaetz, current U.S. Representatives Anna Paulina Luna and Cory Mills, podcaster Tim Pool, Chief Pentagon Spokesman Sean Parnell, Jeff Clark, and more.

=== Calls for "severe punishment" for Washington Post journalists ===
In August 2025, The Washington Post published an article titled, "Hegseth’s expansive security requirements tax Army protective unit." Journalists Tara Copp, Alex Horton, and Dan Lamothe, whose names were on the byline, wrote: "Defense Secretary Pete Hegseth’s unusually large personal security requirements are straining the Army agency tasked with protecting him as it pulls agents from criminal investigations to safeguard family residences in Minnesota, Tennessee and D.C., according to numerous officials familiar with the operation." In response to the article, Valdez posted on his official government X account, "WaPo intentionally published sensitive details of @SecDef’s security detail for him and his family - putting their safety at risk. There should be severe punishment for what @TaraCopp, @DanLamothe, and @AlexHortonTX are doing."

=== Enforcement of new Pentagon press policy ===
On October 16, 2025, several news organizations that cover the United States Department of Defense from its headquarters, The Pentagon, chose to forfeit their press passes rather than agree to new guidelines imposed by the Department of Defense.

In December 2025, The New York Times sued the Department of Defense, Pete Hegseth, and Sean Parnell seeking an injunction, claiming the Pentagon's policy violated First and Fifth Amendment rights. On March 20, 2026, Judge Paul Friedman ruled for the Times, finding the Pentagon's press policy unconstitutional. The court imposed a permanent injunction and ordered the restoration of press credentials and access for the New York Times journalists.

A second attempt to limit press access at the Pentagon was struck down in early April 2026, with Friedman calling the new restrictions "rather transparent attempts to negate the impact of this court’s order." On behalf of the Department of Defense in The New York Times v. Department of Defense, Text, Valdez submitted two Supplemental Declarations to the court, countering arguments submitted by New York Times journalist and plaintiff Julian Barnes. In his affidavits, Valdez described how he enforced the department’s press policies.

=== Acting Department of Defense Press Secretary (May 2026–August 2026) ===
Valdez speaks to press staff in the Pentagon Briefing Room

In May 2026, Valdez was appointed acting Pentagon press secretary.

During the 2026 Iran war, amidst reports that Iran had quickly restored access to most of its missile sites, Valdez described The New York Times and other outlets as "public relations agents for the Iranian regime" who were attempting to "paint Operation Epic Fury as anything other than a historic accomplishment". Valdez was the Pentagon's primary spokesperson for the ongoing U.S. naval blockade in the Strait of Hormuz, which began in mid-April 2026. Valdez said at the time, "The United States’ blockade in the Strait of Hormuz is operating with full force and delivering the decisive impact we intended. We are inflicting a devastating blow to the Iranian regime’s ability to fund terrorism and regional destabilization. Our Armed Forces in the region will continue to maintain this unrelenting pressure."

On August 24, 2026, Valdez returned to his position as deputy Pentagon press secretary when Kingsley Wilson returned from maternity leave. He served as the acting press secretary for four months.

== Works cited ==
=== Articles ===
- Bade, Rachael (September 6, 2024). "Playbook: The 'courtroom campaign' that wasn't". Politico.
- Beavers, Olivia (April 13, 2021). "Is Texas special election a canary in the GOP's coal mine?". Politico.
- Cameron, Dell (February 1, 2021). "Rep. Matt Gaetz Staffer Cheered On Capitol Rioters Via Parler as They Overran Police". Gizmodo.
- Cheslow, Daniella (May 1, 2026). "Five Eyes in focus with Brat nomination". Politico.
- Cooley, Lauren (April 12, 2018). "Student journalists punished for reporting on violent anti-Trump rally: Lawsuit". Washington Examiner.
- Reform, Campus (2018). "Campus Reform Profile: Joel Valdez". Campus Reform.
- Copp, Tara (August 20, 2025). "Exclusive: Hegseth's expansive security requirements tax Army protective unit". The Washington Post.
- Devlin, Bradley (August 8, 2023). "The Indictment Circus". The American Conservative.
- Griffing, Alex (August 20, 2025). "Hegseth Spox Calls For 'Severe Punishment' For Washington Post Journalists". Mediaite.
- Leonard, Kimberly (July 26, 2025). "Playbook: The 'The center of everything'". Politico.
- Manjarres, Javier (May 17, 2024). "Exclusive: Gaetz Taps Top Aides for Senior Roles on Reelection Campaign". The Floridian Press.
- Nover, Scott (March 20, 2026). "Exclusive: Pentagon press policy ruled unconstitutional in case brought by N.Y. Times". The Washington Post.
- Staff, WEAR (August 20, 2024). "Gaetz defeats Dimmock for District 1 U.S. House Republican seat". WEAR-TV.
- Valdez, Joel (March 27, 2019). "Conservative college student files free speech lawsuit over 2017 campus dispute". Fox & Friends (Interview). Interviewed by Steve Doocy, Ainsley Earhardt. Fox News.
- Wemple, Erik (March 20, 2026). "Judge Rules Pentagon Restrictions on Press Are Unconstitutional". The New York Times.
- Wooten, Claude (July 12, 2025). "Ex-Matt Gaetz Advisor Lands at Defense Department, "So Help Me God!"". 2paragraphs.
- Zigterman, Ben (December 14, 2019). "UI settles free-speech lawsuit with students involved in incident at 2017 Trump protest". The News-Gazette (Champaign–Urbana).
- Report, Daily Illini Staff (November 20, 2017). "University instructor arrested, allegedly assaulted students". The Daily Illini.
- Minik, Andrew (November 18, 2017). "VIDEO: Instructor arrested for attacking conservative students". Campus Reform.
- Kaza, Meghana (April 1, 2019). "University responds to free speech executive order". The Daily Illini.
- Entous, Adam; Haberman, Maggie; Swan, Jonathan (May 12, 2026). "U.S. Intelligence Shows Iran Retains Substantial Missile Capabilities". The New York Times.
- Timotija, Filip (May 1, 2026). "Pentagon says US naval blockade has cost Iran $4.8 billion". The Hill.

=== Posts ===
- Valdez, Joel [@JoelValdezDOW] (August 24, 2026). "I return to my position as Deputy Pentagon Press Secretary" (Tweet) – via X (formerly Twitter).
