= Senator Gates =

Senator Gates may refer to:

- Charles W. Gates (1856–1927), Vermont State Senate
- Francis H. Gates (1839–1925), New York State Senate
- John W. Gates (New York politician) (1872–1966), New York State Senate
