= Don Gaetz =

American politician (born 1948)

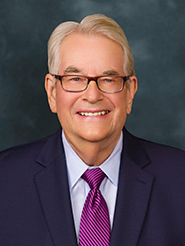
- Official portrait, 2024

President of the Florida Senate
- In office November 20, 2012 – November 18, 2014
- Preceded by: Mike Haridopolos
- Succeeded by: Andy Gardiner

Member of the Florida Senate
- Incumbent
- Assumed office November 19, 2024
- Preceded by: Doug Broxson
- Constituency: 1st district
- In office November 7, 2006 – November 8, 2016
- Preceded by: Charlie Clary
- Succeeded by: Redistricted
- Constituency: 4th district (2006–2012); 1st district (2012–2016)

Personal details
- Born: Donald Jay Gaetz; January 22, 1948 (age 78) Rugby, North Dakota, U.S.
- Party: Republican
- Spouses: Margaret Kruger (m. 1974; div. 1980); Victoria Quertermous (m. 1981)
- Relations: Gaetz family
- Children: 2, including Matt
- Parent: Jerry Gaetz (father)
- Education: Concordia College (BA); Troy State University (MPA)

Donald Jay Gaetz (/ˈɡeɪts/ GAYTS; born January 22, 1948) is an American businessman and Republican politician who has been a member of the Florida State Senate since 2024, representing parts of Northwest Florida. He previously served from 2006 to 2016 and was Senate president from 2012 to 2014.

== Early life and career ==
Gaetz was born in Rugby, North Dakota, the son of Olive (Knutson) and Jerry Gaetz, a former mayor of the city and a state legislator. Jerry Gaetz was a candidate for Lieutenant Governor of North Dakota at the 1964 North Dakota Republican Party state convention, where he died of a heart attack while his son watched television coverage of the event.

Gaetz attended the Evangelical Lutheran-affiliated Concordia College, graduating with his bachelor's degree in religion and political science, and then Troy State University, receiving his Master of Public Administration in education before moving to the state of Florida in 1978.

== Career ==
Shortly after receiving his master's degree, Gaetz worked in Jacksonville as a hospital administrator, and lobbied the legislature to create hospice care programs. In 1983, Gaetz founded VITAS Healthcare Corporation with a group of investors, which he later sold for nearly half a billion dollars in 2004.

=== Okaloosa County School Board ===
In 1994, Gaetz ran for the Okaloosa County School Board, receiving the Republican nomination and then challenging incumbent school board member Jean Long, the Democratic nominee, and Susan Matuska, the Libertarian nominee, in the general election. He ended up winning, receiving 69% of the vote to Long's 20% and Matuska's 11%.

During his first term, Gaetz campaigned for a one-cent sales tax to fund school construction and renovation, which was easily approved by the county's voters in a 1995 special election.

In 1997, he called for an investigation into the conduct of a vice-principal at Niceville High School, where his son went to school, after reports surfaced of the vice-principal promoting his religious beliefs while working at the school. Following his call for an investigation, which he said was warranted by the vice-principal's attempts "to make people who didn't share his views feel as though they were somehow second-class Christians or that they were in danger of damnation," he said, "I have received death threats from individuals who mistakenly believe the way to advance their own particular brand of Christianity is to threaten the life of someone who is a Christian not of their particular kind."

When he ran for re-election in 1998, Gaetz was opposed by only Republican candidate James Campbell, whom he defeated in an open primary with 67% of the vote.

Gaetz opted to run for Okaloosa County superintendent of schools in 2000, and faced David Morgan, the principal of Niceville High School, in the Republican primary. He defeated Morgan handily, winning 68% of the vote and advancing to the general election, where he was opposed by William Lynch, the Democratic nominee, and John Hughes, an independent candidate. Neither Lynch nor Hughes posed a significant challenge to Gaetz, and he won his first term with 75% of the vote to Lynch's 18% and Hughes' 7%. He was unopposed for re-election in 2004. During his time as superintendent, the Okaloosa County School District increased from twenty-seventh in the state in student performance to first.

=== Florida Senate ===
When incumbent state senator Charlie Clary was unable to seek re-election in 2006 due to term limits, Gaetz ran to succeed him in the 4th District, which stretched from Pensacola to Panama City, including parts of southern Bay County, Escambia County, Okaloosa County, Santa Rosa County, and Walton County. He was ready to face state representative Holly Benson in the Republican primary, but Benson ultimately declined to run, so Gaetz won the nomination, and then the general election, unopposed.

During his first term in the Senate, Gaetz served as Chairman of the Senate Education Committee and attracted headlines when he attacked a Florida Department of Education official over a teacher bonus initiative. Gaetz sponsored legislation that would have expanded Florida Comprehensive Assessment Test material to include social studies, broadened the group of people determining state standards, granted honors diplomas to high-achieving test takers, and taught world languages in elementary schools. He was re-elected without opposition in 2010.

In 2012, following the reconfiguration of the state's legislative districts, Gaetz was drawn into the 1st District, which included much of the territory that he had previously represented but dropped the extension into Pensacola for an inclusion of Holmes County, Jackson County, and Washington County. He won the Republican nomination uncontested; in the general election he faced independent candidate Richard Harrison. Gaetz campaigned with grassroots efforts to introduce himself to potentially new constituents in the district and attacked his opponent for his "misunderstanding of the legislative process." Ultimately, Gaetz was re-elected by winning 74% of the vote to Harrison's 26%.

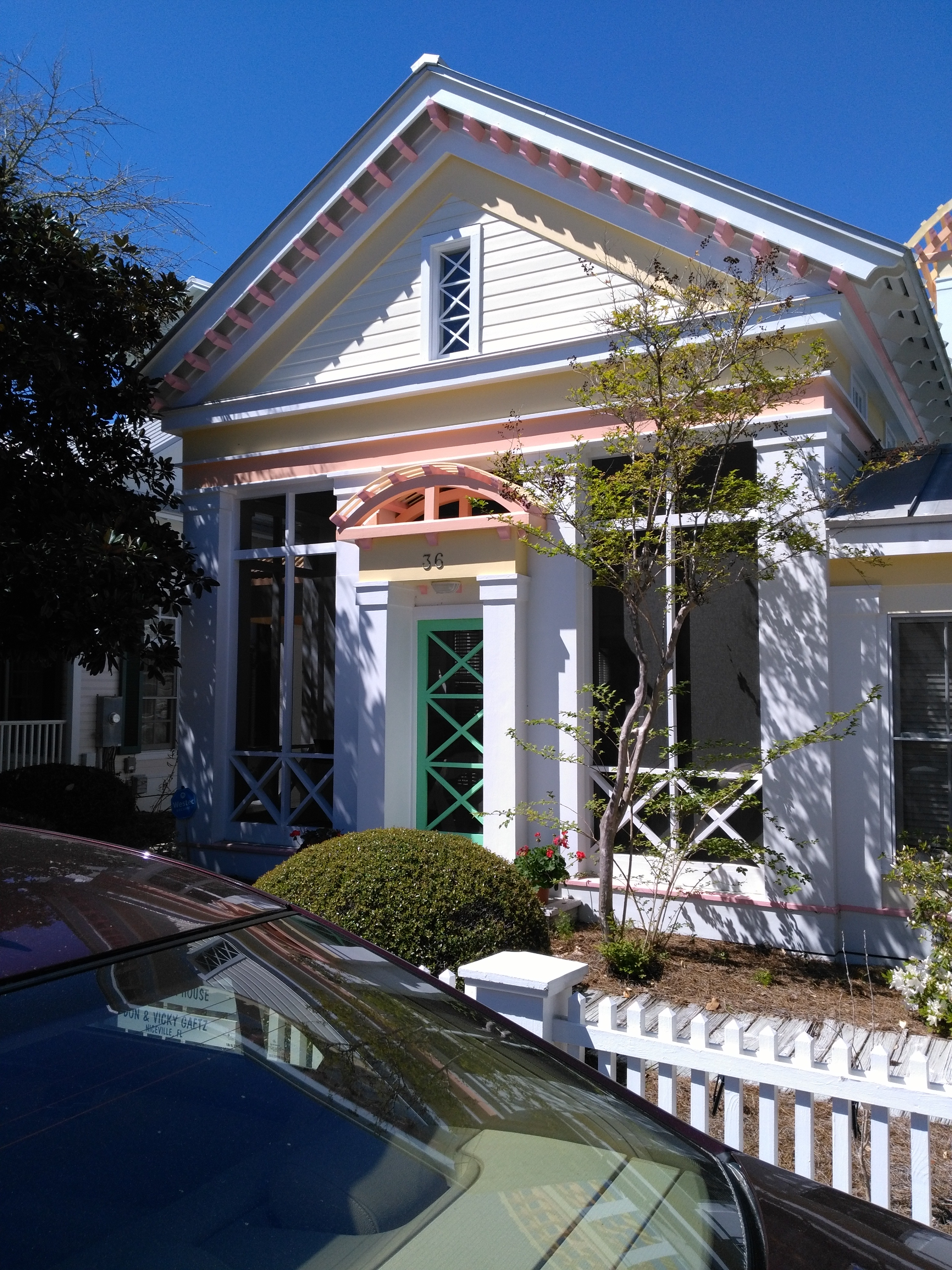
This house served as Truman's home in the 1998 film, The Truman Show. The house is owned by the Gaetz family.

Gaetz served as the president of the Florida Senate from 2012–2014.

=== Interim ===
He was appointed by the Senate to the Constitution Revision Commission and by the House of Representatives as a member and chairman of Triumph Gulf Coast, a $1.5 billion economic development and recovery fund for coastal Northwest Florida. He was also appointed by the president of the Senate to serve on the Florida Commission on Ethics until 2024.

=== Second Senate tenure ===
In October 2023, Gaetz announced that he would run again in his old seat in the 2024 Florida Senate election to succeed term-limited Republican incumbent Doug Broxson. Gaetz proceeded to win the election in November 2024 with 64.6% of the vote, defeating Democrat Lisa Newell.

== Stephen Alford ==
Florida businessman Steve Alford pleaded guilty in a $25 million extortion plot targeting Don Gaetz in a convoluted scheme to secure a presidential pardon for Gaetz's son, Matt, who came under investigation regarding allegations of sex trafficking. Alford later told investigators that he lied to the Gaetzes about the pardon.

On August 22, 2022, U.S. district judge Casey Rodgers sentenced Alford (aged 62) to 63 months plus three years supervised release after he pleaded guilty in 2021 to one count of wire fraud.

== Fraud lawsuit ==
In 2013, the U.S. Department of Justice filed a lawsuit against VITAS for allegedly committing Medicare fraud since 2002, when Gaetz still worked at the company. Gaetz denied any role in any wrongdoing that occurred. The case was settled confidentially in January 2018.

== Personal life ==
Gaetz and his wife, Victoria (née Quertermous) reside in Seaside, Florida, in a house that was used in the film The Truman Show; a sign on their white picket fence says "the Truman house". Gaetz has two children; his son, Matt Gaetz, served as a member of the U.S. House of Representatives, and his daughter, Erin, was director of digital content for Jeb Bush's 2016 presidential campaign.

Florida Senate
| Preceded by Charlie Clary | Member of the Florida Senate from the 4th district 2006–2012 | Succeeded by Aaron Bean |
| Preceded by Audrey Gibson; Doug Broxson | Member of the Florida Senate from the 1st district 2012–2016; 2024–present | Succeeded by Doug Broxson; Incumbent |
Political offices
| Preceded by Mike Haridopolos | President of the Florida Senate; 2012–2014 | Succeeded by Andy Gardiner |
