= Jerry Gaetz =

American railroader and politician (1914–1964)

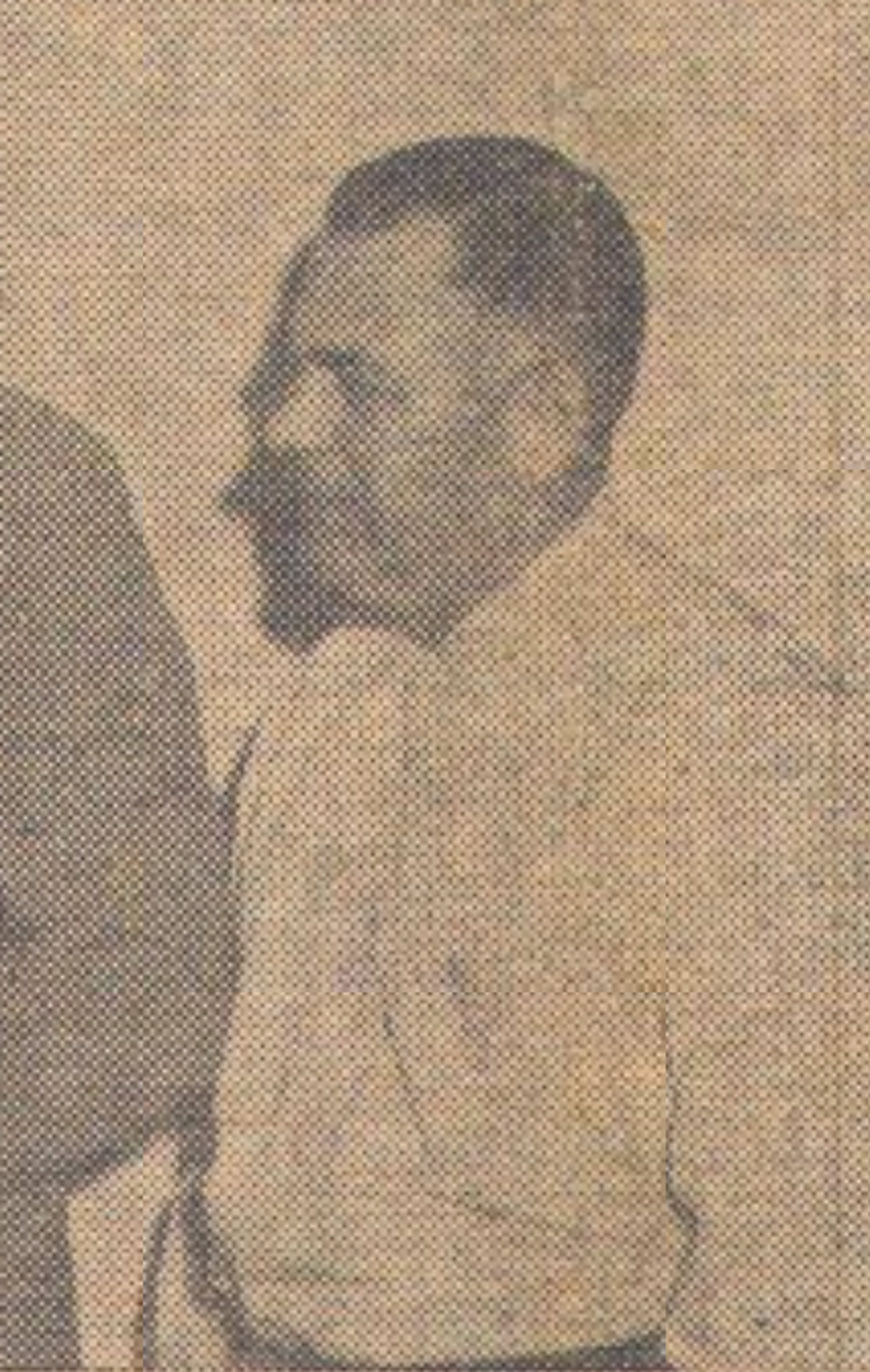
- Gaetz in 1960

Member of the North Dakota Senate
- In office 1964 – April 9, 1964

Mayor of Rugby, North Dakota
- In office 1958 – April 3, 1962
- Succeeded by: Dr. C. B. Weimer

Personal details
- Born: April 25, 1914 Grand Forks, North Dakota, U.S.
- Died: April 9, 1964 (aged 49) Bismarck, North Dakota, U.S.
- Resting place: Rosehill Cemetery, Minot
- Party: Republican
- Spouse: Olive Knutson (m. 1942)
- Children: 3, including Don
- Relatives: Matt Gaetz (grandson)
- Education: North Dakota State College of Science; University of Oklahoma

Military service
- Allegiance: United States
- Branch/service: United States Army
- Years of service: 1942–1946
- Rank: First lieutenant
- Unit: 14th Traffic Regulation Group
- Battles/wars: World War II; U.S. home front

Stanley Jerome Gaetz (April 25, 1914 – April 9, 1964) was an American railroader and politician from North Dakota. A member of the Republican Party, Gaetz served in the North Dakota Senate in 1964 and was mayor of the town of Rugby from 1958 until 1962. Gaetz briefly ran for lieutenant governor in 1964.

Gaetz died on April 9, 1964, after giving a speech in support of Barry Goldwater at the state party convention. His son Don Gaetz later served as the president of the Florida Senate from 2012 until 2014, while his grandson Matt Gaetz served as a U.S. representative from 2017 until 2024.

== Biography ==
=== Early life, education, and career ===
Stanley Jerome Gaetz was born on April 25, 1914, in Grand Forks, North Dakota. Gaetz attended Grand Forks Central High School and Minot High School, and he graduated from the North Dakota State College of Science in 1938. He later attended the University of Oklahoma, where he was a member of the Sigma Chi fraternity.

Gaetz later became an employee of the Great Northern Railway. On August 27, 1942, Gaetz enlisted in the United States Army, becoming a first lieutenant in the 14th Traffic Regulation Group. During World War II, Gaetz was the trainmaster of the White Pass and Yukon Route, a railway line between Whitehorse and Skagway that had been taken over by the army during the war. Gaetz was discharged from the army on February 3, 1946.

Following the war, Gaetz returned to Great Northern, where he served as a district roadmaster for the town of Rugby. In this position, Gaetz guaranteed the ability for Native American laborers to settle in Rugby. Gaetz also became a horse breeder, selling Morgan horses in 1953.

=== Political career and death ===
A member of the Republican Party, Gaetz served as mayor of Rugby for two terms between 1958 and 1962. Rugby, which was a rural agricultural town with a population of around 3,700, was claimed to be the geographic center of North America; Gaetz proposed taking advantage of this fact to turn the town into a tourist attraction. His plan called for the construction of a $20,000 museum, as well as a trailer park, exhibition building, garden, and zoo.

Gaetz's political slogan was "Unbought, unbossed, unbowed". During his mayoralty, Gaetz threatened to sue the Minot school board when the board considered unfairly firing Wayne Sanstead, a high school debate coach who had been elected as a Democratic state representative. Gaetz would later call himself "North Dakota's most progressive mayor". In 1960, Gaetz was appointed by Governor John E. Davis to the Governor's Committee on Children and Youth, serving on the Special Needs of Indian Youth subcommittee.

Gaetz served in the North Dakota Senate in 1964. That year, Gaetz ran for lieutenant governor, challenging incumbent Frank A. Wenstrom in the Republican primary. At the Pierce County Republican Party convention in March, the county party elected Gaetz as its chairman and endorsed his candidacy for lieutenant governor. However, Gaetz withdrew from the race two days later, endorsing Wenstrom.

On April 9, 1964, Gaetz attended the North Dakota Republican Party convention in Bismarck. Gaetz, who had been the chairman of North Dakotans for Goldwater, gave a speech urging the convention to endorse U.S. Senator Barry Goldwater for president. Following the speech, Gaetz walked into the crowd to shake hands, whereupon he suffered a heart attack and collapsed. Gaetz was taken to a local hospital, but died shortly afterwards at the age of 49. Gaetz was buried in the Rosehill Cemetery in Minot.

=== Personal life ===
Gaetz married Olive Knutson in 1942. They had three children, including Don Gaetz, who would later become the president of the Florida Senate. Gaetz's grandson Matt Gaetz was elected to the United States House of Representatives in 2016 and served four terms.
