= Florida's 7th House of Representatives district =

American legislative district

Florida's 7th State House of Representatives district
Representative
Jason Shoaf; R–Port St. Joe
- Demographics: 74.7% White; 21.1% Black; 4.7% Hispanic; 0.4% Asian; 0.6% Native American; 0.1% Hawaiian/Pacific Islander; 1.4% Other
- Population (2010) • Voting age: 156,188; 102,931

Florida's 7th House district elects one member of the Florida House of Representatives. The district is represented by Jason Shoaf. The district is located in the Florida Panhandle, and encompasses the Forgotten Coast, as well as part of the Nature Coast and the Big Bend. The district covers all of Calhoun County, Gulf County, Liberty County, Franklin County, Wakulla County, Jefferson County, Madison County, Taylor County, and Lafayette County, as well as the western half of Leon County. The largest city in the district is Perry. As of the 2010 Census, the district's population is 156,188.

This district covers most of the rural eastern Panhandle, and as a result it has skewed heavily Republican, with Shoaf winning his 2019 special election with over 71% of the vote.

There was a vacancy between March 25, 2005 and June 14, 2005 due to the death of the incumbent, David Coley. His wife and Chipola College professor Marti Coley won the special election to fill the seat.

There was a vacancy between January 11, 2019 and June 18, 2019 when the incumbent, Halsey Beshears, was appointed by Governor Ron DeSantis as the secretary of the Florida Department of Business and Professional Regulation. Businessman Jason Shoaf won the special election to fill the seat.

== Representatives from 1967 to the present ==
Representatives by party affiliation
Party	Representatives
Republican	6
Democratic	5

#	Name	Term of service	Residence	Political party
1	Sam Campbell	1967–1968	DeFuniak Springs	Republican
2	Jerry Melvin	1968–1972	Fort Walton Beach	Democratic
3	Wayne Mixson	1972–1978	Graceville	Democratic
4	Sam Mitchell	1978–1992	Vernon	Democratic
5	Robert Trammell	1992–1996	Marianna	Democratic
6	Jamey Westbrook	1996–1998	Port St. Joe	Democratic
7	Bev Kilmer	1998–2004	Tallahassee	Republican
8	David Coley	2004–2005	Marianna	Republican
	Vacant	2005		
9	Marti Coley	2005–2012	Marianna	Republican
10	Halsey Beshears	2012–2019	Pensacola	Republican
	Vacant	2019		
11	Jason Shoaf	2019–present	Port St. Joe	Republican

== See also ==
- Florida's 3rd Senate district
- Florida's 5th Senate district
- Florida's 2nd congressional district
- Florida's 5th congressional district
