= David Coley =

American politician (1961–2005)

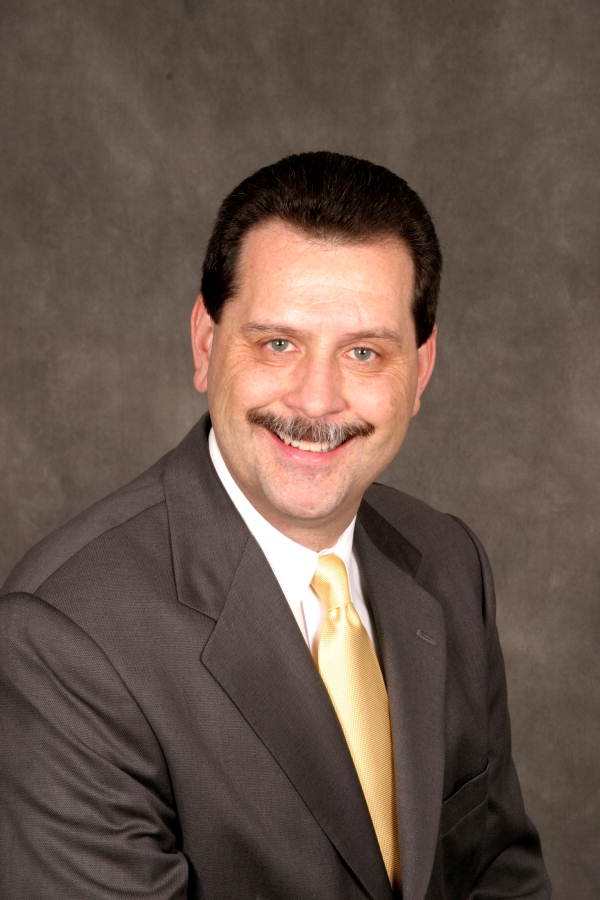

Member of the Florida House of Representatives from the 7th district
- In office November 3, 2004 – March 27, 2005
- Preceded by: Bev Kilmer
- Succeeded by: Marti Coley

Personal details
- Born: November 8, 1961 Louisville, Kentucky
- Died: March 25, 2005 (aged 43) Tallahassee, Florida
- Party: Republican
- Spouse: Marti Coley
- Children: 3
- Education: Chipola Junior College; Murray State University
- Occupation: Higher education administrator, legislative aide, journalist

David A. Coley (November 8, 1961 – March 25, 2005) was a Republican politician from Florida who served as a member of the Florida House of Representatives from the 7th district from 2004 until his death in 2005.

== Early life ==
Coley was born in Louisville, Kentucky, in 1961. He attended Murray State University before moving to Florida in 1976. Coley worked as a legislative aide to Republican Congressman Bill Grant and Representatives Robert Trammell and Allan Bense before he was appointed the special services coordinator at Chipola College.

== Florida House of Representatives ==
In 2004, when State Representative Bev Kilmer opted to run for Congress rather than seek re-election, Coley ran to succeed her in the 7th district. In the Republican primary, he faced former State Representative Jamey Westbrook, who had been elected to a single term in the State House in 1996 before being defeated by Kilmer in 1998. Coley defeated Westbrook by a wide margin, winning 63 percent of the vote to his 37 percent.

In the general election, Coley faced the Democratic nominee, Carl Duncan, an education consultant for the state Department of Corrections. Coley defeated Duncan in a landslide, winning 71 percent of the vote.

== Death ==
Coley died of liver cancer on March 25, 2005. He was succeeded in the State House by his widow, Marti.
