= Jamey Westbrook =

American politician (born 1948)

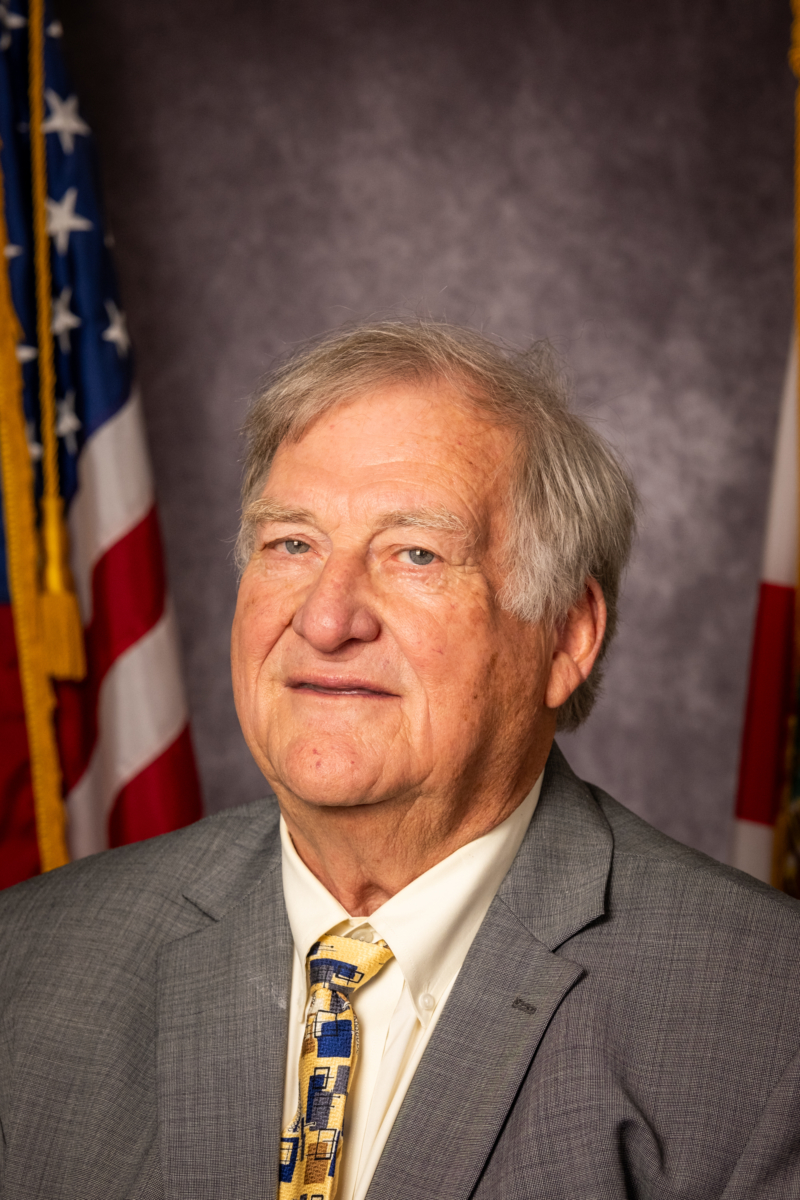
- Official portrait, 2024

Member of the Florida House of Representatives from the 7th district
- In office November 5, 1996 – November 3, 1998
- Preceded by: Robert Trammell
- Succeeded by: Bev Kilmer

Personal details
- Born: August 21, 1948 (age 78) Donalsonville, Georgia
- Party: Democratic (until 2004); Republican (2004–present)
- Spouse: Gayle Williams
- Education: Chipola Junior College; University of South Alabama
- Occupation: Farmer

Jamey Westbrook (born August 21, 1948) is an American politician from Florida who served as a member of the Florida House of Representatives from the 7th district from 1996 to 1998, and currently serves on the Jackson County Commission. He was initially a Democrat but switched to the Republican Party in 2004.

== Early life ==
Westbrook was born in Donalsonville, Georgia, in 1948, and moved to Florida later that year. He attended Chipola Junior College and the University of South Alabama, where he was an assistant basketball coach. Westbrook settled in Bascom, where he maintained a farm and owned a well-drilling company.

== Florida House of Representatives ==
In 1996, State Representative Robert Trammell declined to seek re-election, and Westbrook ran to succeed him in the 7th district. In the Democratic primary, Westbrook faced attorney Frank Baker and David Warriner, a former legislative aide. Westbrook placed first in the primary, winning 42 percent of the vote, and advanced to a runoff election with Warriner, who placed second with 30 percent. Westbrook narrowly defeated Warriner in the runoff, receiving 51 percent of the vote to Warriner's 49 percent. He proceeded to the general election, where he was opposed by Republican Mark Anderson, a Panama City attorney. Westbrook defeated Anderson, receiving 57 percent of the vote to his 43 percent.

Westbrook ran for re-election in 1998, and was challenged by Republican Bev Kilmer, a cosmetologist who owned a chain of salons. Shortly before the qualifying deadline, Westbrook was indicted by federal prosecutors for fraud. Prosecutors alleged that Westbrook conspired with federal officials to fraudulently transfer peanut quotas to his farm, and that he filed false disaster claims for farm losses. Westbrook said that the charges were politically motivated, and "as frivolous a thing as I've ever seen." Nonetheless, to avoid a crowded Democratic primary, Westbrook's wife, Gayle, filed for the same legislative district, but when no other challengers filed, she dropped out of the race. Kilmer only narrowly defeated Westbrook in the general election, winning 51 percent of the vote to his 49 percent. Shortly after the election, Westbrook was acquitted of the conspiracy charges.

In 2000, Westbrook challenged Kilmer for re-election, arguing that, in light of his acquittal, "there is going to be a real race this time." The race attracted attention from both state parties, and Kilmer defeated Westbrook to win a second term, winning 53–47 percent.

Westbrook ran for the State House again in 2004, when Kilmer ran for Congress, and did so as a Republican Party, citing his conservative beliefs. David Coley, one of Westbrook's former legislative aides, defeated him in the Republican primary by a wide margin, winning 63 percent of the vote to his 37 percent. In 2012, Westbrook ran for the State House again, losing in the Republican primary to Halsey Beshears, placing third with 21 percent of the vote. In 2016, Westbrook ran for the 5th district as an independent, challenging Republican State Representative Brad Drake. Drake defeated Westbrook in a landslide, winning re-election with 68 percent of the vote.

== Jackson County Commission ==
In 2024, Westbrook ran for the Jackson County Commission from the 5th district. He won the Republican primary, receiving 40 percent of the vote to Jim Peacock's 32 percent, Mickey Gilmore's 20 percent, and Ana Gonzalez's 9 percent, and was unopposed in the general election.

In November 2025, after the Jackson County Commission voted to terminate its contract with County Attorney Michelle Jordan, she presented a memorandum to the board that alleged misconduct by Westbrook and County Administrator Jim Dean. Shortly afterwards, the commission voted to terminate her contract immediately and to file a complaint against her with the Florida Bar.
