= Jason Shoaf =

Florida politician

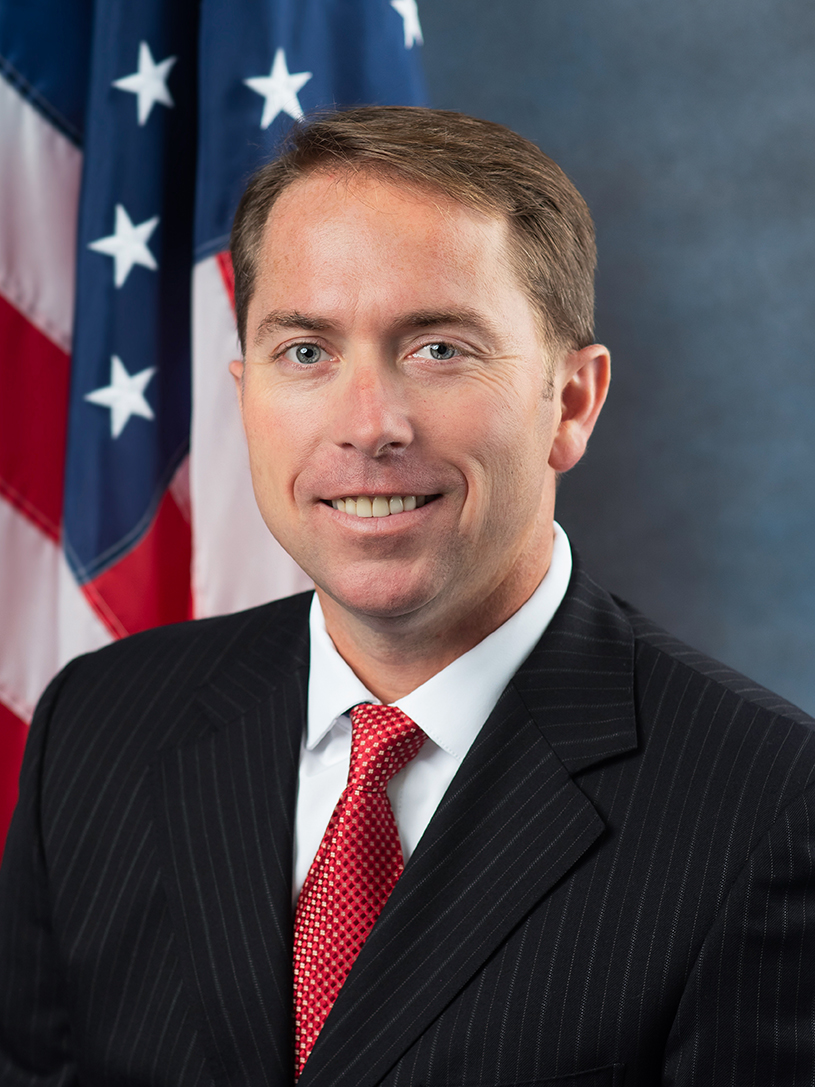

Member of the Florida House of Representatives from the 7th district
- Incumbent
- Assumed office June 18, 2019
- Preceded by: Halsey Beshears

Personal details
- Born: September 20, 1979 (age 46) Panama City, Florida, U.S.
- Party: Republican
- Children: 2
- Education: Tallahassee State College (attended); Florida State University (BA)
- Website: Campaign website

Jason Shoaf (born September 20, 1979) is an American politician serving as a member of the Florida House of Representatives from the 7th district, which includes Franklin, Gulf, Jefferson, Dixie, Suwannee, Hamilton, Lafayette, Liberty, Taylor, and Wakulla Counties, and part of Leon County. He was first elected in a 2019 special election.

== Early life and education ==
Shoaf was born in Panama City, and attended Tallahassee Community College and Florida State University. He is the nephew of former Governor Wayne Mixson and the grandson of former State Representative Cecil G. Costin.

== Career ==
Shoaf worked as a businessman prior to entering politics, serving as the vice-president of St. Joe Natural Gas Company and Gulf South Self Storage and Alliance Property Management. He was appointed to the board of the Port St. Joe Port Authority Board and to the board of Triumph Gulf Coast, a state-run non-profit tasked with disbursing funds recovered from the Deepwater Horizon oil spill.

=== Florida House of Representatives ===
Following Halsey Beshear's resignation from the House to serve as Secretary of the Florida Department of Business and Professional Regulation, a special election was held to replace Beshears in the House. Shoaf announced that he would run in the special election, and faced Mike Watkins, Lynda Bell, the Sneads City Manager and a former Miami-Dade County Commissioner; and 2018 congressional candidate Virginia Fuller in the primary election. He campaigned on "bringing high-paying jobs to the district" and on "expand[ing] vocational opportunities" in public schools and emphasized his outsider credentials. He was endorsed by several prominent northern Florida Republican politicians—former State House Speaker Allan Bense, former State Senate President Don Gaetz, and Congressman Matt Gaetz—while Watkins was endorsed by local sheriffs and the state's police and firefighter unions and Bell was endorsed by a right-to-life group. The campaign grew heated and personal, with Watkins nearly starting a fight with Shoaf after Watkins alleged that Shoaf touched his fiancée's arm, an allegation Shoaf & witnesses denied. Ultimately, despite the perceived closeness of the race, Shoaf ended up winning by a wide margin, receiving 49% of the vote to Watkins's 27%, Bell's 20%, and Fuller's 4%.

Shoaf advanced to the general election, where he faced Ryan Terrell, a Tallahassee communications consultant and the Democratic nominee. Against Terrell, Shoaf focused on his conservative positions, like his support for Donald Trump, gun rights, and anti-abortion legislation, but also campaigned on nonpartisan issues, like helping the district recover from Hurricane Michael. Ultimately, despite the district's Democratic voter registration and history of supporting downballot Democratic candidates, Shoaf prevailed over Terrell in a landslide, winning 71% of the vote to Terrell's 29%.
