= Robert Trammell =

Robert Trammell may refer to:

- Robert Trammell (Florida politician) (born 1945), former member of the Florida House of Representatives
- Bob Trammell (born 1974), former member of the Georgia House of Representatives
