= Bev Kilmer =

American politician

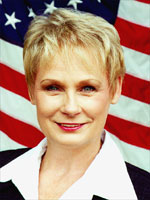

Member of the Florida House of Representatives from the 7th district
- In office November 3, 1998 – November 2, 2004
- Preceded by: Jamey Westbrook
- Succeeded by: David Coley

Personal details
- Born: January 24, 1951 (age 75) Detroit, Michigan, U.S.
- Party: Republican
- Spouse: Larry Kilmer
- Children: Teresa Dean, Ken, Kirk
- Education: Matrix Institute of Business
- Occupation: Business development

Beverly "Bev" J. Kilmer (born January 24, 1951) is an American Republican politician who served as a member of the Florida House of Representatives from 1998 to 2004, representing the 7th District. She unsuccessfully ran for Congress in 2004 against Congressman Allen Boyd, and again for the Florida House in 2016.

== History ==
Kilmer was born in Detroit, Michigan, and dropped out of high school to have a family. She later earned her GED and attended the Matrix Institute of Business, and moved to Florida in 1970. She became a hairdresser and opened up a chain of hair salons in Tallahassee, ultimately deciding to run for office after testifying against a proposed regulation that she thought would hurt hair stylists.

== Florida House of Representatives ==
In 1998, Kilmer announced that she would run against incumbent Democratic State Representative Jamey Westbrook in the 7th District, which stretched from Miramar Beach to Marianna and Tallahassee. Shortly after Westbrook filed for re-election, he was indicted for defrauding a federal peanut quota program after he falsified farming quotas and federal disaster claims for farmers. Shortly afterwards, Westbrook's wife, Gayle Westbrook, also filed to run in the Democratic primary, and they announced that they would decide which of them would actually run for the seat. Ultimately, Gayle dropped out of the race, leaving Jamey Westbrook as the Democratic nominee. A contentious general election ensued in the ancestrally Democratic district, with Westbrook emphasizing his humble roots, and his innocence of the charges brought against him, by airing television advertisements showing him riding his tractor through his peanut fields—which inadvertently reminded voters of his looming indictment. In the end, Kilmer narrowly defeated Westbrook, 51–49%, winning by just 800 votes, which came from her sizable margins in Bay County, which she won 66–34%, and in Walton County, where she won 76–24%. Kilmer joined a Republican-dominated legislature and Republican Governor Jeb Bush, which was the first time that the state had been governed exclusively by Republicans since Reconstruction.

When Kilmer ran for re-election in 2000, she was challenged by Westbrook, who was acquitted of the charges against him just weeks after he lost re-election in 1998. The state party targeted Kilmer for defeat, hoping that Westbrook's acquittal and the district's history of voting for Democrats would allow them to pick it up. However, Kilmer ended up expanding her margin of victory over Westbrook, defeating him 53–47% as the Florida Panhandle overwhelmingly backed George W. Bush over Al Gore in the presidential election.

Kilmer sought a third and final term in the House in 2002, when she was opposed by businessman Cliff Thomas, the Democratic nominee. Despite Kilmer's close previous races, Thomas received little outside support and ultimately lost in a landslide, receiving only 41% of the vote to Kilmer's 59%.

== 2004 congressional campaign ==
When U.S. Senator Bob Graham opted to run for President rather than seek re-election, Congressman Allen Boyd, who represented the 2nd District, considered running to replace Graham. If Boyd vacated the seat, Republicans were bullish on their chances of replacing him, and began recruiting Kilmer to run for the seat. Though Boyd ultimately declined to run for the Senate, Kilmer nonetheless jumped in the race. She joined the race with significant support from the Republican establishment, with First Lady Laura Bush, House Speaker Dennis Hastert and NRCC Chair Tom Reynolds coming to the district to host fundraisers on Kilmer's behalf. Kilmer was able to keep relative financial parity with Boyd, raising $1 million to Boyd's $1.6 million, and had influential figures in the Republican Party come to the district to campaign for her. Boyd ran a television advertisement accusing Kilmer of voting to provide her husband's company, All-Tech Southeast, with a $600,000 grant from the state Department of Community Affairs, which prompted All-Tech to file a lawsuit against Boyd for defamation of character. Meanwhile, Kilmer attracted criticism for copying her answers to an AARP questionnaire from materials distributed by the NRCC, which prompted an internal investigation on Kilmer's campaign as to how the copying had occurred.

By the end of the campaign, however, observers predicted that Boyd had a clear advantage, which was ultimately borne out on Election Day, when Boyd defeated Kilmer in a landslide, winning 62% of the vote to her 38%.

== After the House ==
After losing her 2004 congressional campaign and leaving the State House, Kilmer took a job as a grants administrator for the Florida Department of Education. When Kilmer's successor in the State House, David Coley, died from liver cancer in 2005, Kilmer considered running to succeed him in the special election that followed, but ultimately deferred to Coley's widow, Marti Coley, who ended up winning the seat.

In 2016, Kilmer announced that she would challenge State Representative Brad Drake, who eventually succeeded Coley in Kilmer's old seat, in the Republican primary. An early poll showed Drake with a wide lead over Kilmer, who was largely unknown by the district's Republican voters. As the primary drew closer, Kilmer came under fire in local news coverage for whether she met the constitutional residency requirements. Kilmer had, ostensibly, moved to Texas, where she had registered to vote and cast ballots in several elections, which would have made her ineligible to run for the legislature until the following year. Kilmer, however, argued that she and her husband had maintained property in the district and that she was being "singled out because I'm the outsider." In the end, however, Kilmer lost her comeback bid by an overwhelming margin, receiving only 26% of the vote to Drake's 76%, and winning none of the counties in her former district.
