= Sarah Clemmons =

American college administrator

Sarah Martin Clemmons

President of Chipola College
- In office 2017–Incumbent
- Preceded by: Jason Hurst

Personal details
- Born: Marianna, Florida, U.S.
- Spouse: Tracy Clemmons
- Children: 2
- Education: Chipola College, University of West Florida, Florida State University (PhD, 1980))
- Profession: College administrator
- Known for: First woman president of Chipola College

Sarah Martin Clemmons is an American college administrator, who has been the president of Chipola College since 2017.

== Early life and education ==
Sarah Clemmons was raised in Marianna, Florida. She graduated from Marianna High School, Chipola College, University of West Florida, and Florida State University College of Education (FSU). Clemmons completed a doctor of philosophy from FSU in 1980. Her dissertation was titled Identification of writing competencies needed by secondary students to perform assignments in science and social studies classes. Her doctoral advisor was John S. Simmons.

== Career ==
Clemmons joined Chipola College in 1979 as an English instructor. She later became the chair of the literature/language division. Clemmons assisted in the formation of the Academic Center for Excellence, a tutoring program that won the Best Practice Award from the Florida College System Chancellor and was a finalist for a Bellwether Award. Clemmons played a role in establishing bachelor's degree programs in 2003. She revived the Phi Theta Kappa and Brain Bowl programs at Chipola. She was the Senior Vice President of Instruction for 15 years prior to 2016. As the chief academic officer, Clemmons oversaw Chipola's accreditation, grants, and the evaluation of its academic support programs. In October 2016, she began serving as interim president, replacing her predecessor, Jason Hurst. Clemmons became the president of Chipola in 2017. She is the first woman and second alumnus to serve as the president of Chipola.

Clemmons was named Citizen of the Year by the Jackson County Chamber of Commerce in 2015.

Clemmons serves on the board of trustees of Jackson Hospital. She is a past chair of the Jackson County Chamber of Commerce Board of Directors.

== Personal life ==
Clemmons is married to Tracy Clemmons, an operations management consultant at the Florida Agency for Persons with Disabilities. Their son, Martin Clemmons, works at Archbold Medical Center in Thomasville, Georgia as an internal medicine physician. Their daughter, Sarah Kathryn Dugan is a prosecuting assistant state's attorney in Tallahassee, Florida. Clemmons is active in the First Baptist Church in Marianna.

== See also ==
- List of women presidents or chancellors of co-ed colleges and universities
