= Halsey Beshears =

Republican politician from Florida

Halsey W. Beshears
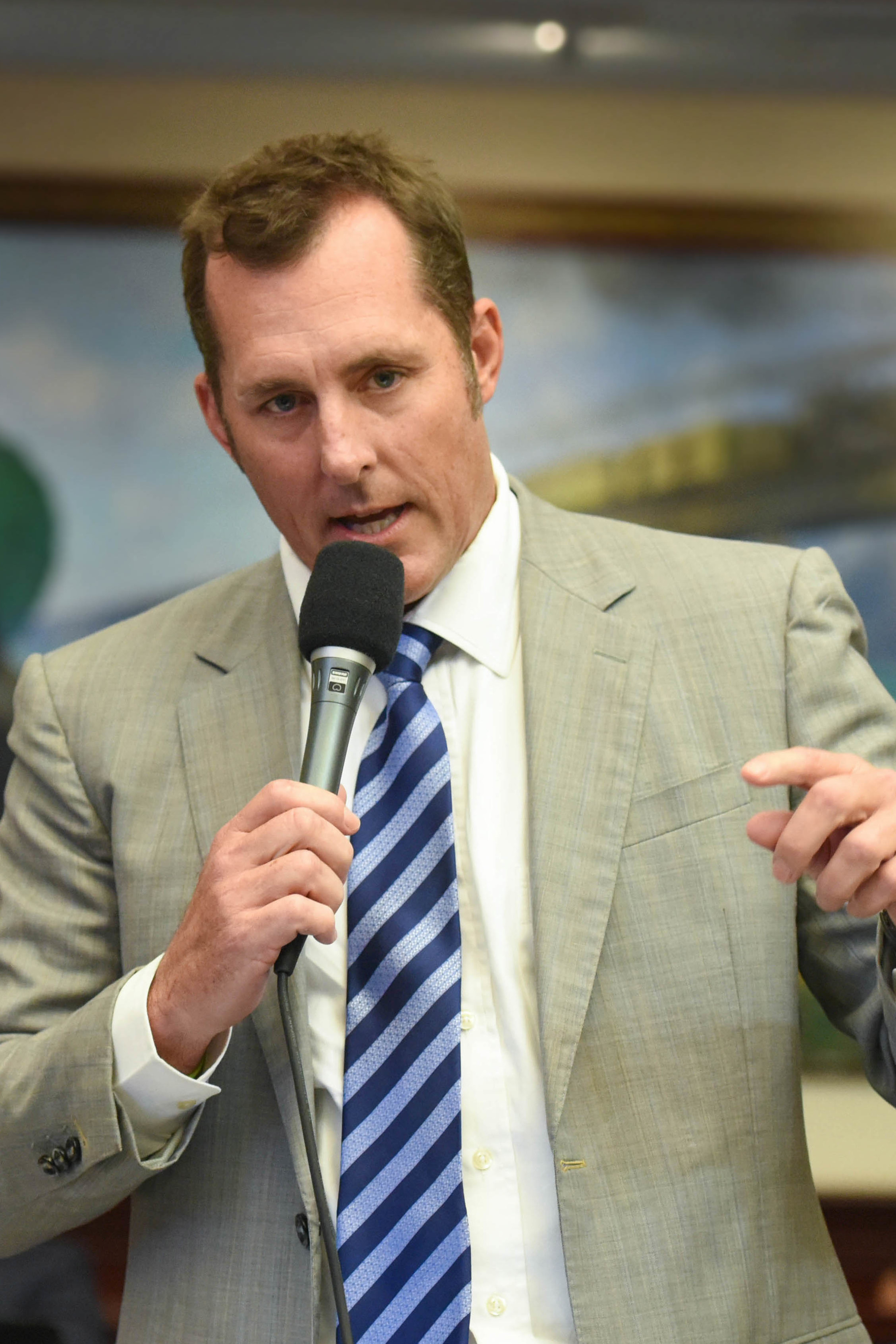

Secretary of the Florida Department of Business & Professional Regulation
- In office January 12, 2019 – January 29, 2021
- Preceded by: Jonathan Zachem
- Succeeded by: Julie Imanuel Brown

Member of the Florida House of Representatives from the 7th district
- In office November 6, 2012 – January 11, 2019
- Preceded by: Marti Coley
- Succeeded by: Jason Shoaf

Personal details
- Born: November 27, 1971 (age 54) Winter Park, Florida
- Party: Republican
- Children: Grace, Caroline, Suzanne
- Education: Florida State University (BS); University of Florida (MS)
- Profession: Nursery grower

Halsey W. Beshears (born November 27, 1971, in Winter Park, Florida) is a Republican politician from Florida. He served as the secretary of the Florida Department of Business and Professional Regulation (DBPR) from January 2019 to January 2021. Previously, he was a member of the Florida House of Representatives, representing parts of the Florida Panhandle from 2012 until his appointment as DBPR secretary.

== History ==
Beshears's family moved to Monticello and he graduated from Brookwood School, a private school in Thomasville, Georgia, in 1989. He later attended Florida State University and the University of Florida. Since 1997, Beshears has served as an executive at Simpson Nurseries and the President of Total Landscape Supply, which serves wholesale clients across much of the United States.

== Florida House of Representatives ==
Following redistricting in 2012, Beshears opted to run for the Florida House of Representatives, and defeated Mike Williams, former Florida Representative Jamey Westbrook, and Don Curtis in the Republican primary election, winning with 38% of the vote. In the general election, Beshears faced Robert Hill, the Democratic nominee and the former Liberty County Administrator, Clerk of Court, and superintendent.

Beshears was re-elected to his second and third term in the legislature in 2014 and 2016 without opposition.

During the 2014 session of the Florida Legislature, Beshears sponsored a bill in the Florida Legislature that made application to Congress to convene an Article V Convention to propose amendments to the United States Constitution for the limited purpose of proposing a Single Subject Amendment. This bill passed the Florida Legislature making Florida the first state in United States history to apply for an Article V Convention to propose this amendment to the United States Constitution. See the April 23, 2014, entry in List of state applications for an Article V Convention.

== Department of Business and Professional Regulation ==
On December 11, 2018, then-Governor Elect Ron DeSantis announced he would appoint Beshears as Secretary of the Florida Department of Business and Professional Regulation in his new administration. Beshears resigned from the Florida House of Representatives and took office as DBPR secretary on January 11, 2019.

On June 25, 2020, DeSantis publicly announced “We’re not going back, closing things.” The following day Halsey Beshears issued Executive Order 2020-09, effectively closing drinking establishments with the exception of certain locations like restaurants and other food vendors. At the time, bars reopened on June 5 after being ordered to close since March 2020.

Florida House of Representatives
Preceded by Marti Coley	Member of the Florida House of Representatives from the 7th district 2012–2019	Succeeded by Jason Shoaf
