= Marti Coley =

American politician

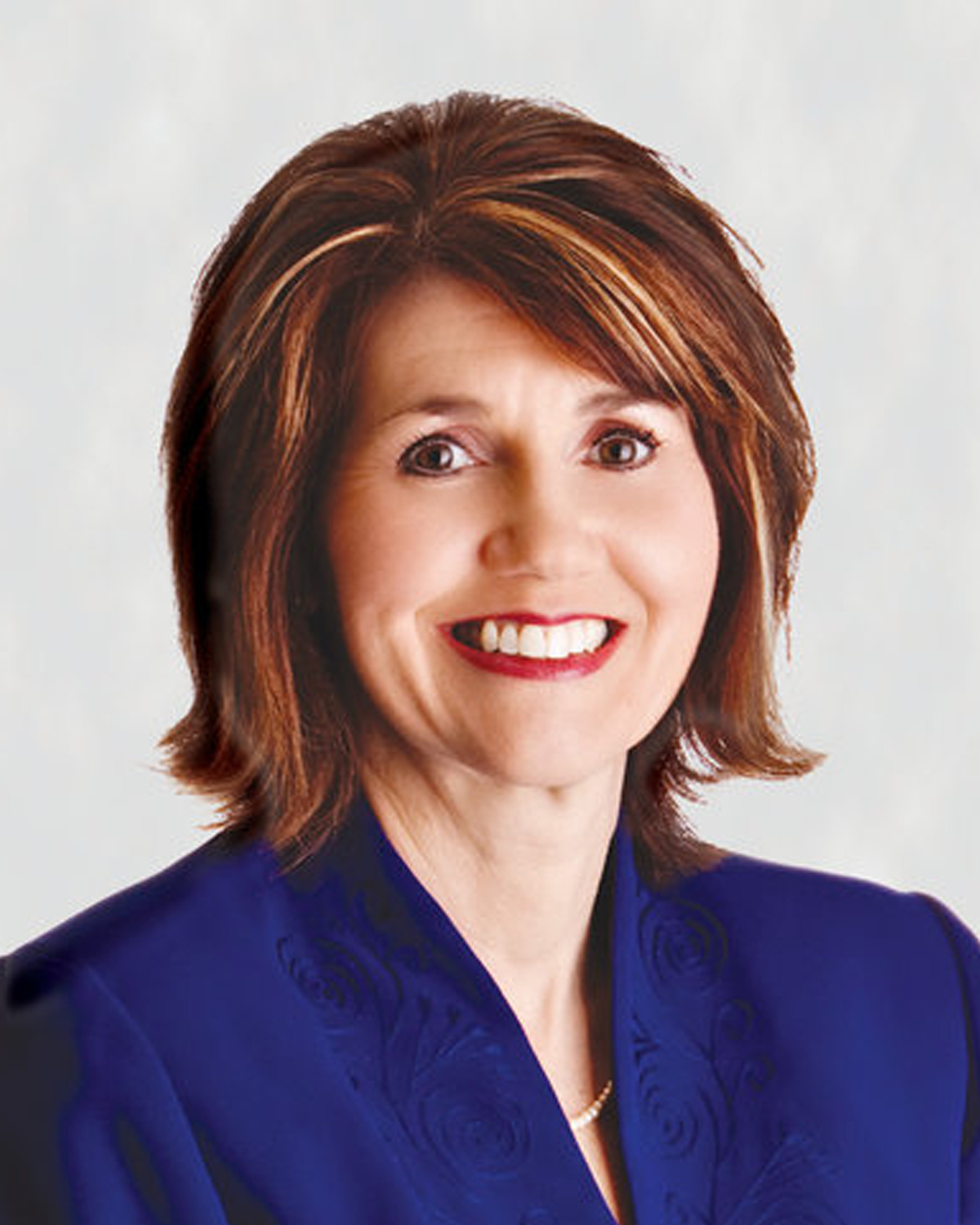

Speaker Pro Tempore of the Florida House of Representatives
- In office November 20, 2012 – November 4, 2014
- Preceded by: John Legg
- Succeeded by: Matt Hudson

Member of the Florida House of Representatives
- In office June 14, 2005 – November 4, 2014
- Preceded by: David Coley
- Succeeded by: Brad Drake
- Constituency: 7th district (2005–2012); 2nd district (2012–2014)

Personal details
- Born: March 15, 1961 (age 65) Blountstown, Florida
- Party: Republican
- Spouse: David Coley (deceased)
- Children: Kristin, Vance, Hunter
- Education: Chipola College (A.A.); Florida State University (B.A.)
- Profession: Teacher

Marti Coley (born March 15, 1961) is a former Republican member of the Florida House of Representatives, representing the 5th District, which includes Holmes County, Jackson County, Walton County, Washington County, and northern Bay County, since 2012, previously representing the 7th District from 2005 to 2012.

== History ==
Coley was born in Blountstown, and attended Chipola College and Florida State University, where she graduated with a degree in English education in 1984. After graduation, she began teaching in Thomasville, Georgia, but moved with her husband to Marianna in 1985. Coley then began teaching at Malone High School, where she worked until 1989, at which point she joined the faculty of Chipola College.

== Florida House of Representatives ==
When her husband, State Representative David Coley, died, Marti Coley ran to succeed him in 2005 in the 7th District, which was based in the Florida Panhandle and included parts of Bay, Calhoun, Gadsden, Jackson, Leon, Liberty, Okaloosa, Wakulla, and Washington Counties. In a special election on June 14, 2005, Coley defeated Democratic nominee Carl Joaquin Duncan with 81% of the vote. She was subsequently re-elected without opposition in 2006 and 2008. Coley faced Democratic nominee David B. Pleat when she ran for re-election in 2010, but owing to the conservative nature of the district, she was re-elected easily, winning 74% of the vote.

When Florida House districts were redrawn in 2012, Coley ended up in a radically redrawn district that included much territory that she had not previously represented. In the Republican primary, she encountered Danny Glidewell, whom she easily defeated with 69% of the vote. Independent candidate Travis Pitts was her only opposition in the general election, and she won with 73% of the vote.

While serving in the legislature, Coley opposed legislation that would have outlawed texting while driving, noting, "[T]exting while driving, applying makeup while driving, reading other materials while driving, and the list could go on and on, are all covered under the statute addressing careless driving (Ch.316.1925 Florida Statutes). Because I believe it is covered under that statute, I will not be voting in favor of the bill." Additionally, she supported legislation that would allow insurance companies operating in Florida to continue receiving tens of millions of dollars in tax breaks, declaring that the bill "helps us not raise taxes, enables us to support business like we all like to do, so that we have jobs for our citizens." During her final term in the House, from 2012 to 2014, Coley served as the Speaker pro tempore of the Florida House of Representatives.

Florida House of Representatives
Preceded by David Coley	Member of the Florida House of Representatives from the 7th district June 28, 2005 – November 20, 2012	Succeeded by Halsey Beshears
Preceded by Brad Drake	Member of the Florida House of Representatives from the 5th district November 20, 2012 – November 18, 2014	Succeeded by Brad Drake
