= Robert Trammell (Florida politician) =

American politician (born 1945)

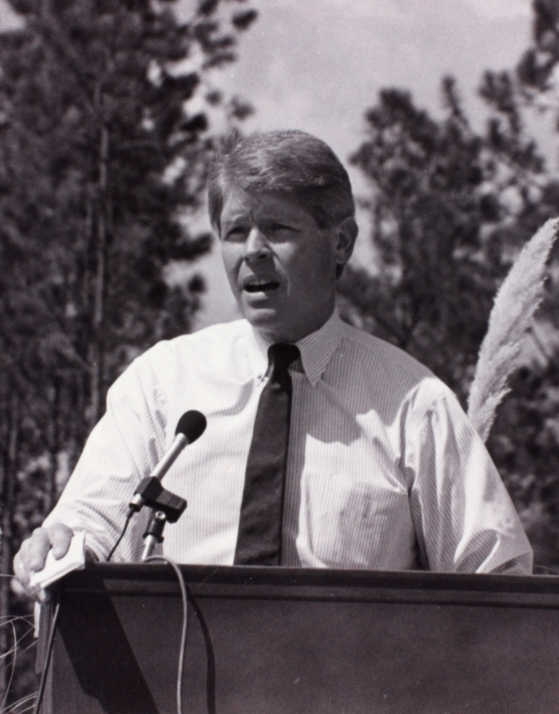
- Trammell speaking in 1990

Member of the Florida House of Representatives
- In office November 4, 1986 – November 5, 1996
- Preceded by: Sam Mitchell
- Succeeded by: Jamey Westbrook
- Constituency: 8th district (1986–1992); 7th district (1992–1996)

Personal details
- Born: August 17, 1945 (age 81) Marianna, Florida
- Party: Democratic
- Spouse: Kay Sellers
- Relatives: Park Trammell (great uncle)
- Education: Chipola Junior College (A.A.); Florida State University (B.S., M.S.); University of Mississippi School of Law (J.D.)
- Occupation: Attorney

Robert DeWitt Trammell (born August 17, 1945) is an attorney and Democratic politician from Florida who served as a member of the Florida House of Representatives from 1986 to 1996.

== Early life ==
Trammell was born in Marianna, Florida, in 1945. He attended Chipola Junior College, where he played on the basketball team and graduated with his associate degree in 1966. Trammell then attended Florida State University, graduating with his bachelor's degree in 1968 and his master's degree in 1970. He graduated from the University of Mississippi School of Law in 1979, and practiced law in Marianna as an assistant public defender.

== Florida House of Representatives ==
In 1986, State House Speaker James Harold Thompson declined to seek another term in the legislature, and Trammell ran to succeed him in the 8th district. He faced anti-poverty activist Bill McGill and businessman Jim Kearce in the Democratic primary, and defeated both by a wide margin, winning 59 percent of the vote to McGill's 23 percent and Kearce's 18 percent. He faced no opponents in the general election.

Trammell was re-elected without opposition in 1988 and 1990. In 1992, following redistricting, Trammell ran for re-election in the 7th district, and won unopposed.

In 1994, Trammell ran for re-election to a fifth term. He was challenged by Devon Miles, a social science education student at Florida State University, who ran against Trammell as an independent. He defeated Miles in a landslide, winning re-election with 65 percent of the vote.

Trammell declined to seek re-election in 1996, citing his need to "take a break" and "spend some time with my business and family."
