= 2004 United States House of Representatives elections in Florida =

- November 2, 2004

All 25 Florida seats to the United States House of Representatives
	Majority party	Minority party
Party	Republican	Democratic
Last election	18	7
Seats won	18	7
Seat change	Steady	Steady
Popular vote	3,319,296	2,212,324
Percentage	58.98%	39.31%

Republican
50–60%
60–70%
70–80%
80–90%
90>%
Democratic
40–50%
50–60%
60–70%
70–80%
80–90%
90>%

The 2004 United States House of Representatives Elections in Florida were held on November 2, 2004, to determine who would represent the state of Florida in the United States House of Representatives. Representatives are elected for two-year terms; those elected served in the 109th Congress from January 3, 2005, to January 3, 2007. The election coincided with the 2004 U.S. presidential election as well as an election to the United States Senate.

Florida had twenty-five seats in the House, apportioned according to the 2000 United States census. Its delegation to the 108th Congress of 2003-2005 consisted of eighteen Republicans and seven Democrats. In 2004, no districts changed party control, leaving the congressional delegation as an 18–7 split favoring the Republicans.

== Overview ==
United States House of Representatives elections in Florida, 2004
Party	Votes	Percentage	Seats	+/–
Republican	3,319,296	58.98%	18	+/- 0
Democratic	2,212,324	39.31%	7	+/- 0
Other Parties	95,874	1.70%	0	+/- 0
Totals	5,627,494	100%	25	+/- 0

== District 1 ==
2004 Florida's 1st congressional district election
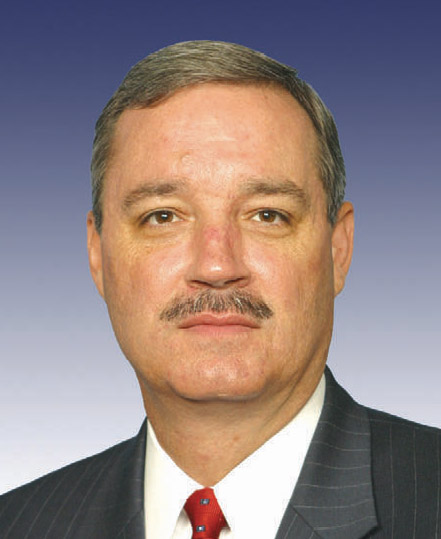

Candidate	Jeff Miller	Mark S. Coutu
Party	Republican	Democratic
Popular vote	236,604	72,506
Percentage	76.5%	23.5%
- County results Miller: 60–70% 70–80% 80–90%
U.S. Representative before election
Jeff Miller (inc.)
Republican
Elected U.S. Representative
Jeff Miller
Republican

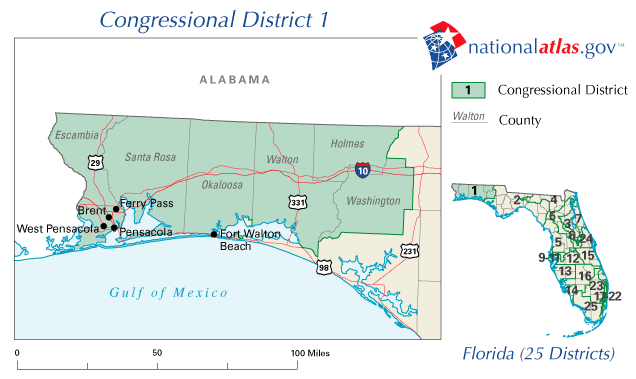

Incumbent Republican representative Jeff Miller, who was initially elected in a special election in 2001, ran for re-election in this staunchly conservative district based in the Florida Panhandle. Miller easily defeated Democratic challenger Mark Coutu.

=== Predictions ===
Source	Ranking	As of
The Cook Political Report	Safe R	October 29, 2004
Sabato's Crystal Ball	Safe R	November 1, 2004

=== Results ===
Florida's 1st congressional district election, 2004
Party	Candidate	Votes	%
Republican	Jeff Miller (inc.)	236,604	76.5
Democratic	Mark S. Coutu	72,506	23.5
Total votes		309,110	100.00
Republican hold			

== District 2 ==
2004 Florida's 2nd congressional district election
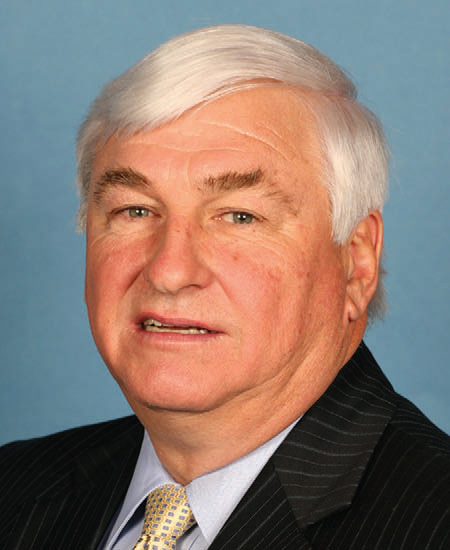

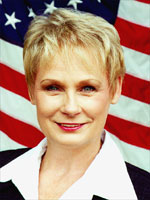
	Majority party	Minority party
Candidate	Allen Boyd	Bev Kilmer
Party	Democratic	Republican
Popular vote	201,577	125,399
Percentage	61.6%	38.4%
- County results Boyd: 50–60% 60–70% 70–80% Kilmer: 50–60% 70–80%
U.S. Representative before election
Allen Boyd
Democratic
Elected U.S. Representative
Allen Boyd
Democratic

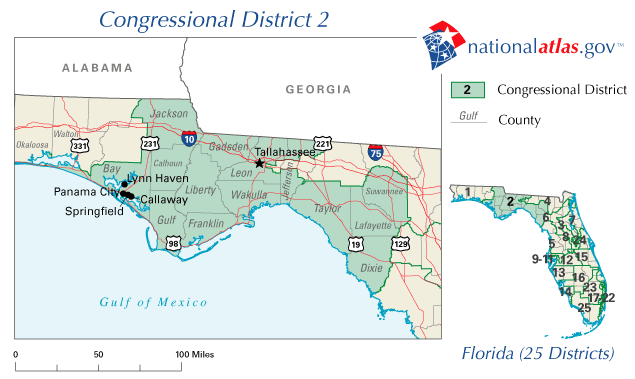

The incumbent was Democrat Allen Boyd, first elected to this seat in 1997. Other contestants in this race included Republican challenger Bev Kilmer, who had served in the Florida House of Representatives, and write-in candidate T. A. Frederick.

Shortly before the election, a company owned by Kilmer's husband sued Boyd for defamation of character. Nonetheless, Boyd was reelected with slightly under 62 percent of the vote.

=== Predictions ===
Source	Ranking	As of
The Cook Political Report	Likely D	October 29, 2004
Sabato's Crystal Ball	Safe D	November 1, 2004

=== Results ===
Florida's 2nd congressional district election, 2004
Party	Candidate	Votes	%
Democratic	Allen Boyd (incumbent)	201,577	61.6
Republican	Bev Kilmer	125,399	38.4
Independent	T. A. Frederick (write-in)	11	0.0
Total votes		326,987	100.00
Democratic hold			

== District 3 ==
2004 Florida's 3rd congressional district election
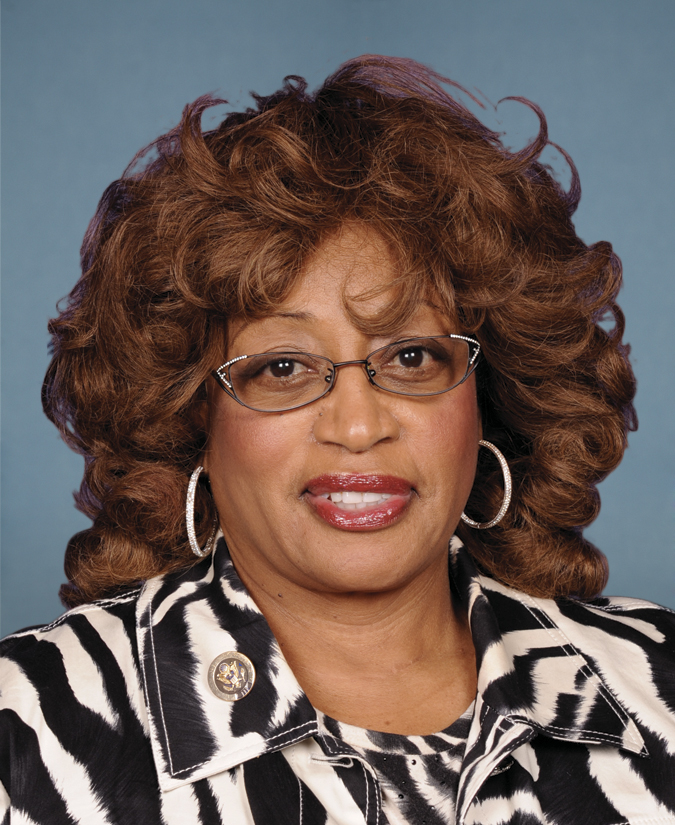
Candidate	Corrine Brown
Party	Democratic
Popular vote	172,833
Percentage	99.2%
- County results Brown: 90–100%
U.S. Representative before election
Corrine Brown
Democratic
Elected U.S. Representative
Corrine Brown
Democratic

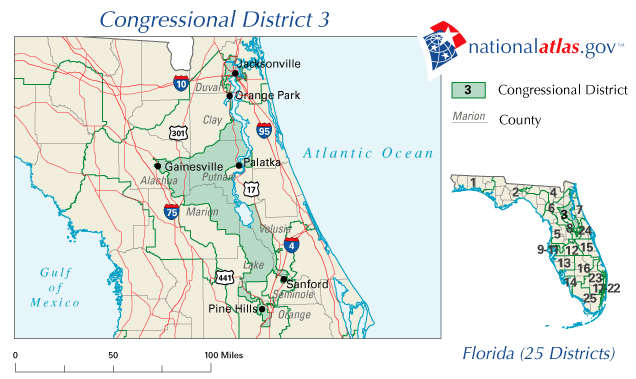

Democrat Corrine Brown, the incumbent since 1993, faced no major-party opposition and easily won re-election over write-in candidate Johnny Brown.

=== Predictions ===
Source	Ranking	As of
The Cook Political Report	Safe D	October 29, 2004
Sabato's Crystal Ball	Safe D	November 1, 2004

=== Results ===
Florida's 2nd congressional district election, 2004
Party	Candidate	Votes	%
Democratic	Corrine Brown (incumbent)	172,833	99.2
Independent	Johnny M. Brown (write-in)	1,323	0.8
Total votes		174,156	100.00
Democratic hold			

== District 4 ==
2004 Florida's 4th congressional district election
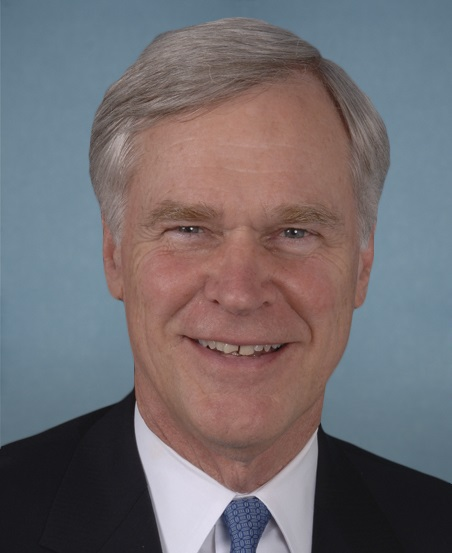
Candidate	Ander Crenshaw
Party	Republican
Popular vote	256,157
Percentage	99.5%
- County results Crenshaw: 90–100%
U.S. Representative before election
Ander Crenshaw (inc.)
Republican
Elected U.S. Representative
Ander Crenshaw
Republican

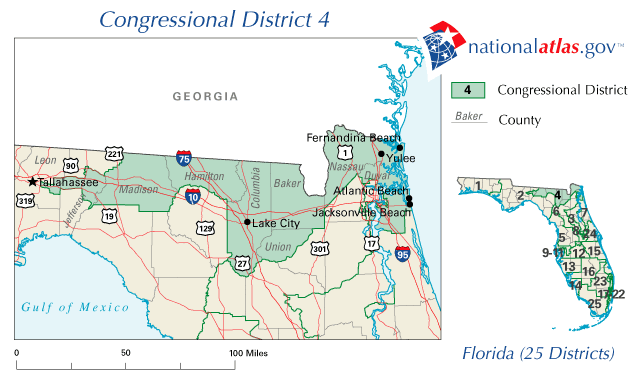

Incumbent Republican Ander Crenshaw faced only marginal opposition from the write-in campaign of perennial candidate Richard Grayson. Crenshaw easily won another term.

=== Predictions ===
Source	Ranking	As of
The Cook Political Report	Safe R	October 29, 2004
Sabato's Crystal Ball	Safe R	November 1, 2004

=== Results ===
Florida's 4th congressional district election, 2004
Party	Candidate	Votes	%
Republican	Ander Crenshaw (inc.)	256,157	99.5
Independent	Richard Grayson (write-in)	1,170	0.5
Total votes		257,327	100.00
Republican hold			

== District 5 ==
2004 Florida's 5th congressional district election
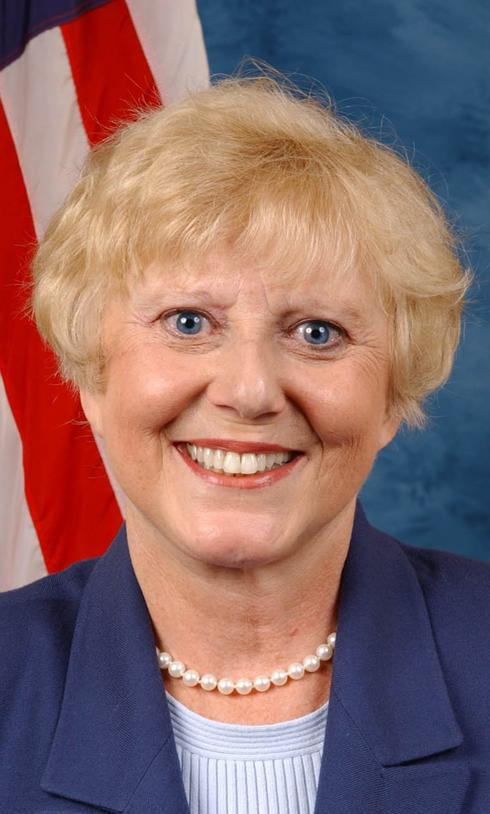

Candidate	Ginny Brown-Waite	Robert G. Whittel
Party	Republican	Democratic
Popular vote	240,315	124,140
Percentage	65.9%	34.1%
- County results Brown-waite: 60–70%
U.S. Representative before election
Ginny Brown-Waite (inc.)
Republican
Elected U.S. Representative
Ginny Brown-Waite
Republican

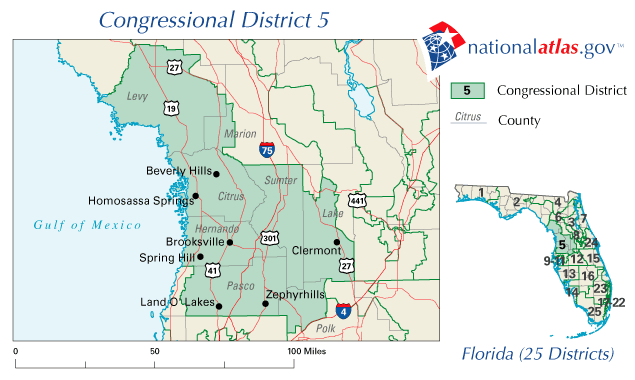

Incumbent Republican Ginny Brown-Waite easily won re-election against attorney Robert Whittel in a race that was not viewed as competitive.

=== Predictions ===
Source	Ranking	As of
The Cook Political Report	Safe R	October 29, 2004
Sabato's Crystal Ball	Safe R	November 1, 2004

=== Results ===
Florida's 5th congressional district election, 2004
Party	Candidate	Votes	%
Republican	Ginny Brown-Waite (inc.)	240,315	65.9
Democratic	Robert G. Whittel	124,140	34.1
Independent	H. David Werder (write-in)	33	0.0
Total votes		364,488	100.00
Republican hold			

== District 6 ==
2004 Florida's 6th congressional district election
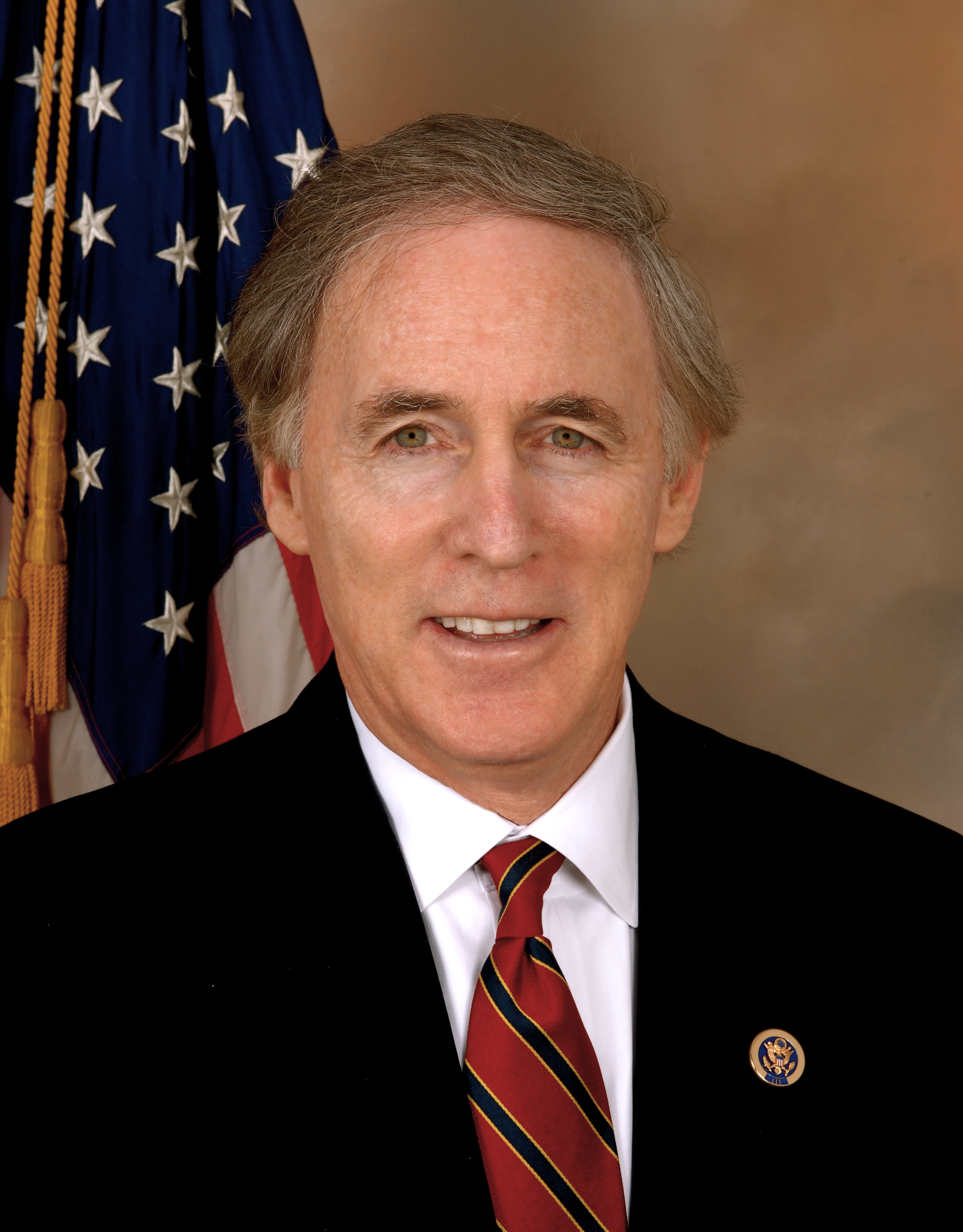

Candidate	Cliff Stearns	David E. Bruderly
Party	Republican	Democratic
Popular vote	211,137	116,680
Percentage	64.4%	35.6%
- County results Stearns: 50–60% 60–70% 70–80% Bruderly: 50–60%
U.S. Representative before election
Cliff Stearns (inc.)
Republican
Elected U.S. Representative
Cliff Stearns
Republican

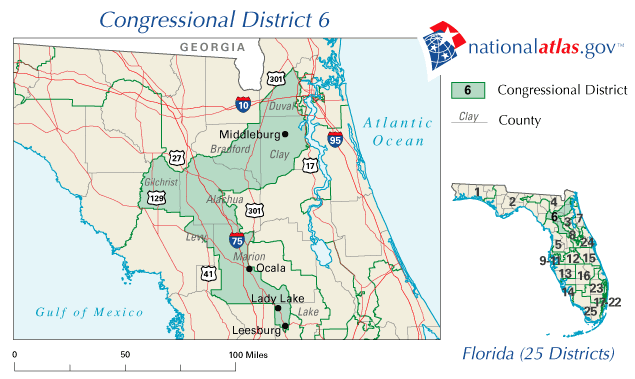

Encompassing North Central Florida, this conservative district is represented by incumbent Republican Congressman Cliff Stearns. Stearns, seeking a ninth term, faced off against Democrat Dave Bruderly and won the election by a wide margin.

=== Predictions ===
Source	Ranking	As of
The Cook Political Report	Safe R	October 29, 2004
Sabato's Crystal Ball	Safe R	November 1, 2004

=== Results ===
Florida's 6th congressional district election, 2004
Party	Candidate	Votes	%
Republican	Cliff Stearns (inc.)	211,137	64.4
Democratic	David E. Bruderly	116,680	35.6
Independent	N. W. O’Brien (write-in)	36	0.0
Total votes		327,853	100.00
Republican hold			

== District 7 ==
2004 Florida's 7th congressional district election
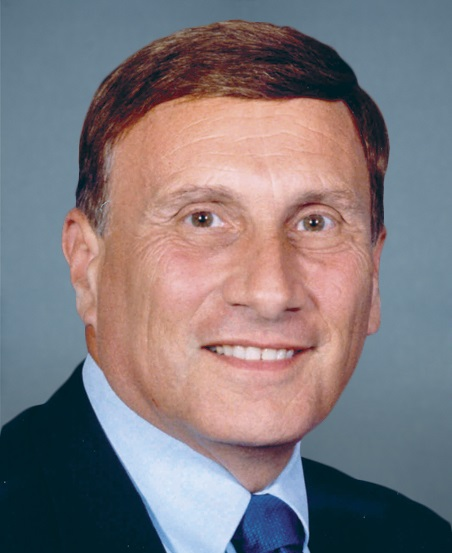
Candidate	John L. Mica
Party	Republican
Popular vote	Unopposed
Percentage
U.S. Representative before election
John Mica
Republican
Elected U.S. Representative
John L. Mica
Republican

=== Predictions ===
Source	Ranking	As of
The Cook Political Report	Safe R	October 29, 2004
Sabato's Crystal Ball	Safe R	November 1, 2004

=== Results ===
Results

Florida's 7th congressional district election, 2004
Party	Candidate	Votes	%
Republican	John L. Mica	Unopposed	

== District 8 ==
2004 Florida's 8th congressional district election
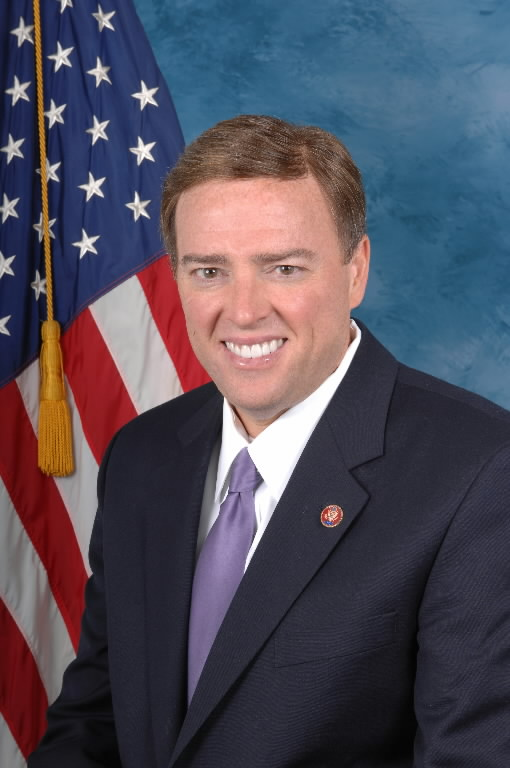

Candidate	Ric Keller	Charlie Stuart
Party	Republican	Democratic
Popular vote	172,232	112,343
Percentage	60.5%	39.5%
- County results Keller: 50–60% 60–70%
U.S. Representative before election
Ric Keller (inc.)
Republican
Elected U.S. Representative
Ric Keller
Republican

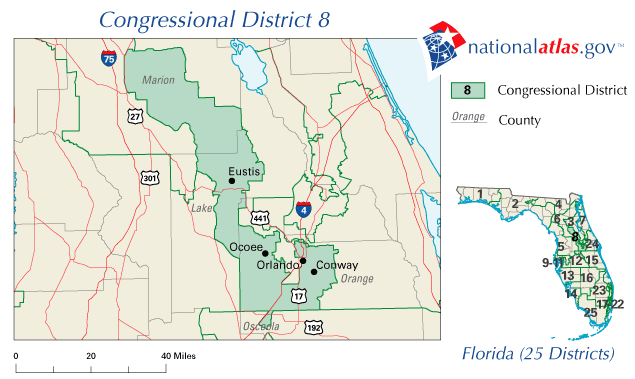

Republican Congressman Ric Keller, seeking a third term, faced off against libertarian Democrat Stephen Murray. Keller won re-election with over 60% of the vote.

=== Predictions ===
Source	Ranking	As of
The Cook Political Report	Safe R	October 29, 2004
Sabato's Crystal Ball	Safe R	November 1, 2004

=== Results ===
Florida's 8th congressional district election, 2004
Party	Candidate	Votes	%
Republican	Ric Keller (inc.)	172,232	60.5
Democratic	Charlie Stuart	112,343	39.5
Total votes		284,575	100.00
Republican hold			

== District 9 ==
2004 Florida's 9th congressional district election
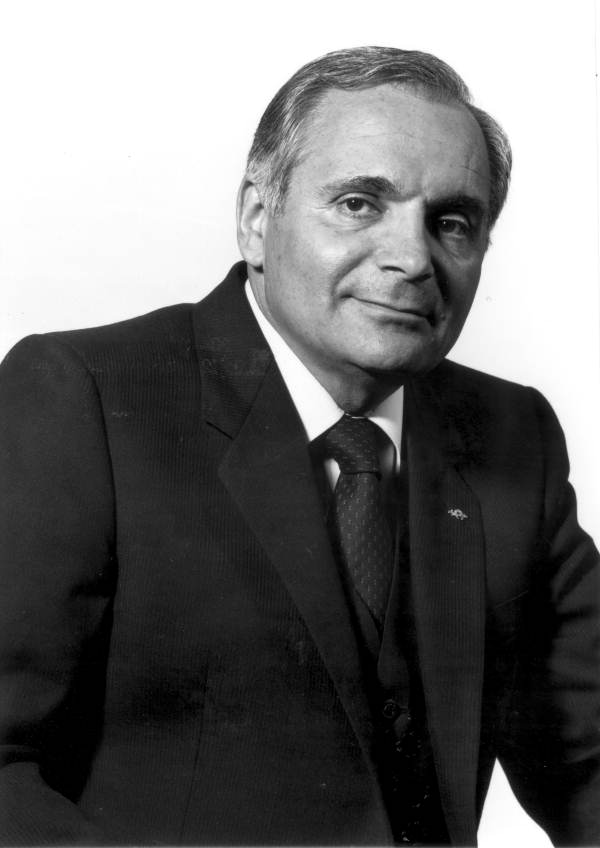
Candidate	Michael Bilirakis
Party	Republican
Popular vote	284,035
Percentage	99.9%
- County results Bilirakis: 90–100%
U.S. Representative before election
Michael Bilirakis
Republican
Elected U.S. Representative
Michael Bilirakis
Republican

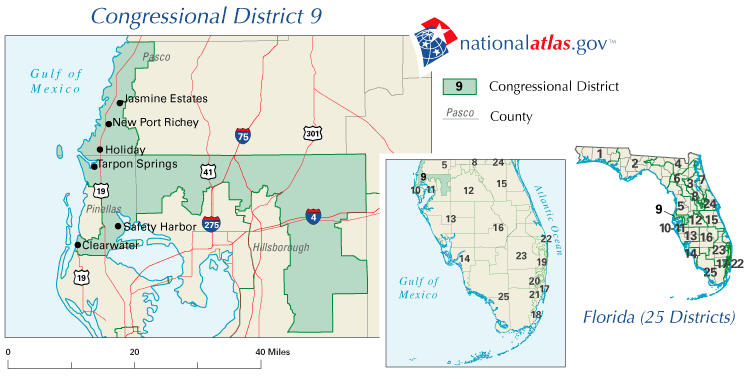

Republican incumbent Congressman Michael Bilirakis ran for a twelfth term. Bilirakis faced no major-party opposition in this Republican-leaning district.

=== Predictions ===
Source	Ranking	As of
The Cook Political Report	Safe R	October 29, 2004
Sabato's Crystal Ball	Safe R	November 1, 2004

=== Results ===
Florida's 9th congressional district election, 2004
Party	Candidate	Votes	%
Republican	Michael Bilirakis	284,035	99.9
Independent	Andrew Pasayan (write-in)	243	0.1
Total votes		284,278	100.00
Republican hold			

== District 10 ==
2004 Florida's 10th congressional district election
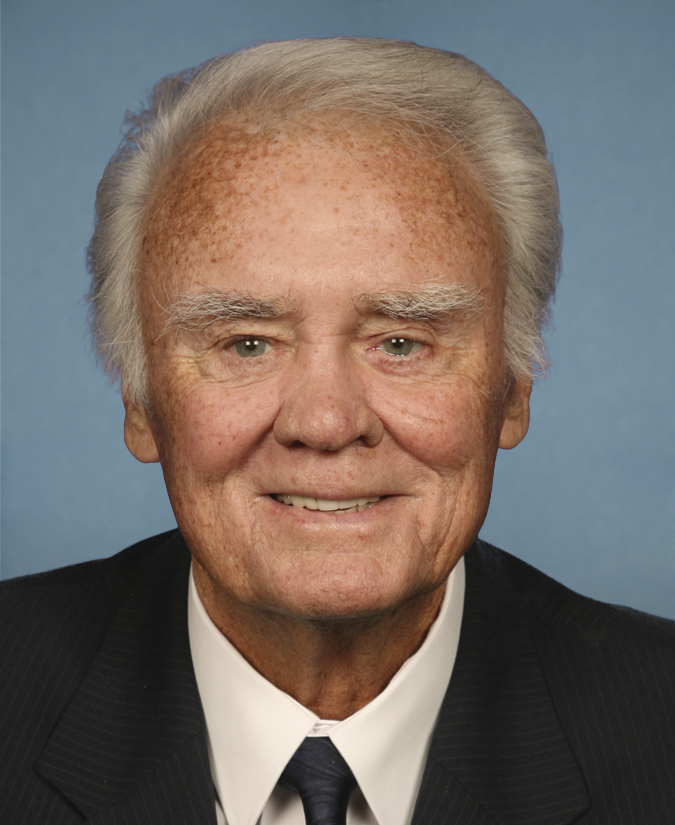

Candidate	Bill Young	Robert D. "Bob" Derry
Party	Republican	Democratic
Popular vote	207,175	91,658
Percentage	69.3%	30.7%
- County results Young: 60–70%
U.S. Representative before election
Bill Young (inc.)
Republican
Elected U.S. Representative
Bill Young
Republican

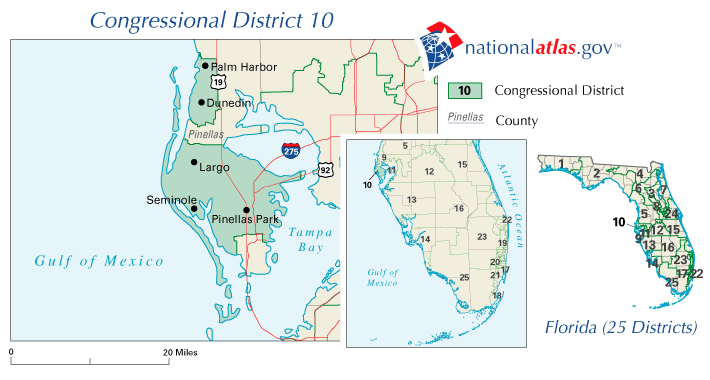

Longtime incumbent Republican Bill Young won re-election over Democrat Bob Derry with almost 70% of the vote.

=== Predictions ===
Source	Ranking	As of
The Cook Political Report	Safe R	October 29, 2004
Sabato's Crystal Ball	Safe R	November 1, 2004

=== Results ===
Florida's 10th congressional district election, 2004
Party	Candidate	Votes	%
Republican	Bill Young (inc.)	207,175	69.3
Democratic	Robert D. "Bob" Derry	91,658	30.7
Total votes		298,833	100.00
Republican hold			

== District 11 ==
2004 Florida's 11th congressional district election
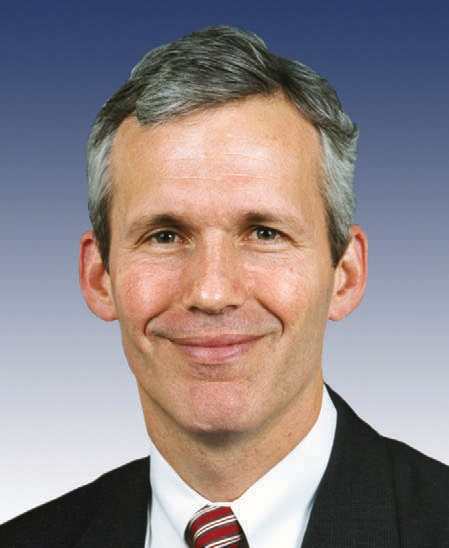

Candidate	Jim Davis	Robert E. Johnson
Party	Democratic	Libertarian
Popular vote	191,780	31,579
Percentage	85.8%	14.2%
- County results Davis: 80–90% 90–100%
U.S. Representative before election
Jim Davis (inc.)
Democratic
Elected U.S. Representative
Jim Davis
Democratic

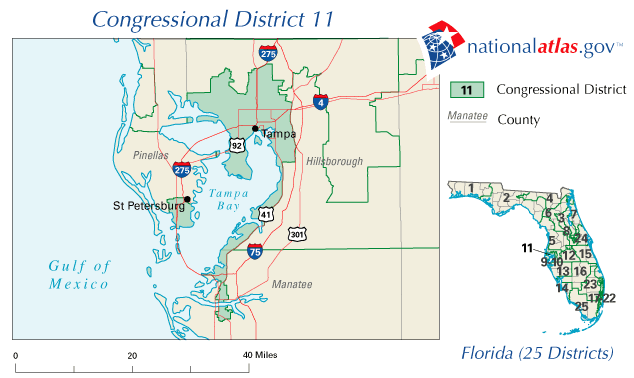

Incumbent Democratic Congressman Jim Davis ran for a fifth term in this liberal district based in Tampa. He faced no Republican challenger.

=== Predictions ===
Source	Ranking	As of
The Cook Political Report	Safe D	October 29, 2004
Sabato's Crystal Ball	Safe D	November 1, 2004

=== Results ===
Florida's 11th congressional district election, 2004
Party	Candidate	Votes	%
Democratic	Jim Davis (inc.)	191,780	85.8
Libertarian	Robert E. Johnson	31,579	14.2
Independent	Karl M. Butts (write-in)	122	0.0
Total votes		223,481	100.00
Democratic hold			

== District 12 ==
2004 Florida's 12th congressional district election
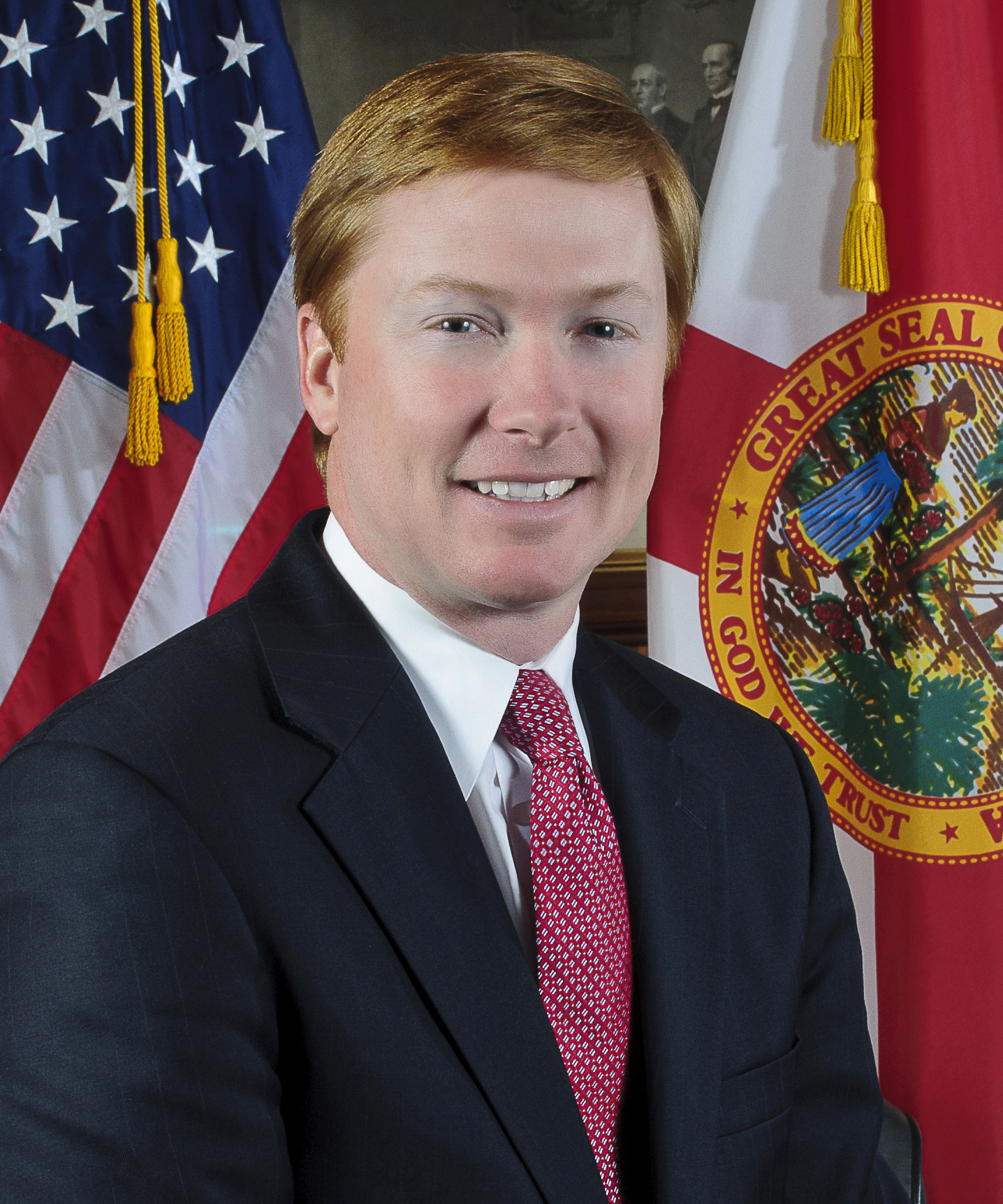

Candidate	Adam Putnam	Bob Hagenmaier
Party	Republican	Democratic
Popular vote	179,204	96,965
Percentage	64.9%	35.1%
- County results Putnam: 60–70% Hagenmaier: 60–70%
U.S. Representative before election
Adam Putnam (inc.)
Republican
Elected U.S. Representative
Adam Putnam
Republican

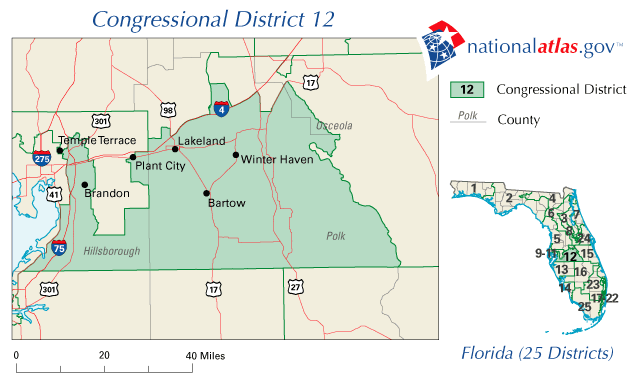

Incumbent Republican Adam Putnam won a third term, defeating Democrat Bob Hagenmaier. Putnam, who was the youngest member of the U.S. Congress before this election, received more than 10 times the campaign donations as his opponent and cruised to an easy victory.

=== Predictions ===
Source	Ranking	As of
The Cook Political Report	Safe R	October 29, 2004
Sabato's Crystal Ball	Safe R	November 1, 2004

=== Results ===
Florida's 12th congressional district election, 2004
Party	Candidate	Votes	%
Republican	Adam Putnam (inc.)	179,204	64.9
Democratic	Bob Hagenmaier	96,965	35.1
Total votes		276,169	100.00
Republican hold			

== District 13 ==
2004 Florida's 13th congressional district election
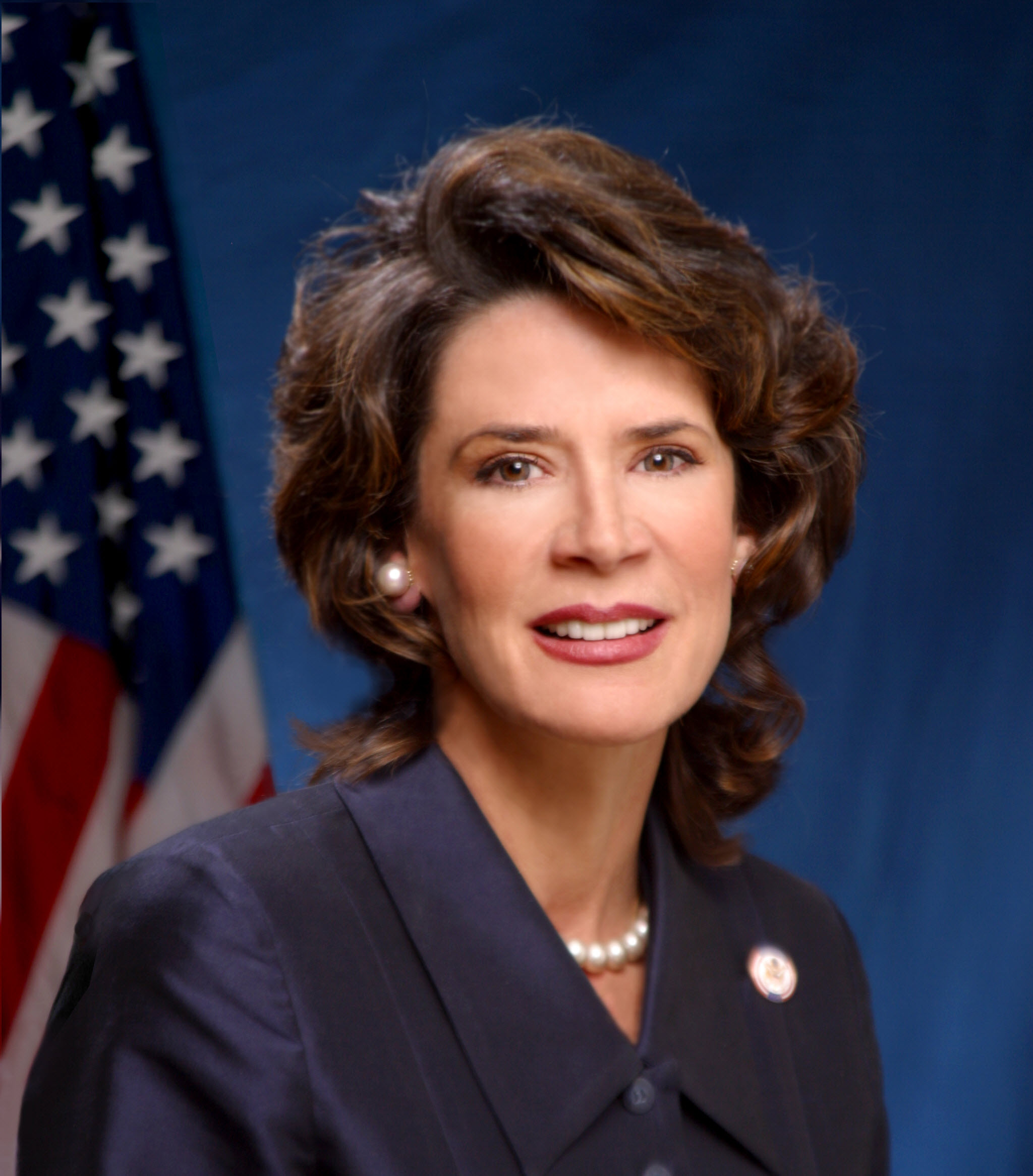

Candidate	Katherine Harris	Jan Schneider
Party	Republican	Democratic
Popular vote	190,477	153,961
Percentage	55.3%	44.7%
- County results Harris: 50–60% 60–70% 70–80%
U.S. Representative before election
Katherine Harris (inc.)
Republican
Elected U.S. Representative
Katherine Harris
Republican

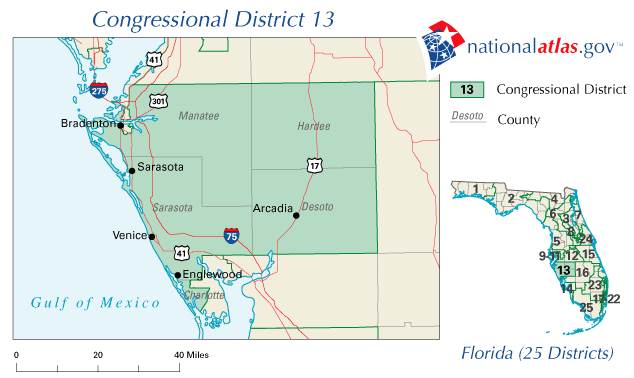

Incumbent Republican Katherine Harris sought a second term and defeated Democratic challenger Jan Schneider.

=== Predictions ===
Source	Ranking	As of
The Cook Political Report	Likely R	October 29, 2004
Sabato's Crystal Ball	Safe R	November 1, 2004

=== Results ===
Florida's 13th congressional district election, 2004
Party	Candidate	Votes	%
Republican	Katherine Harris (inc.)	190,477	55.3
Democratic	Jan Schneider	153,961	44.7
Total votes		344,438	100.00
Republican hold			

== District 14 ==
2004 Florida's 14th congressional district election
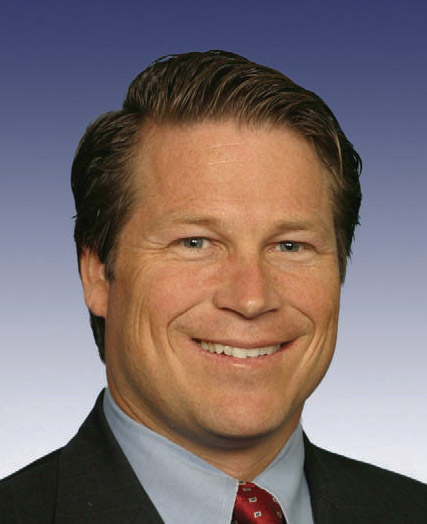

Candidate	Connie Mack IV	Robert M. Neeld
Party	Republican	Democratic
Popular vote	226,662	108,672
Percentage	67.6%	32.4%
- County results Mack: 60–70% 70–80%
U.S. Representative before election
Porter Goss
Republican
Elected U.S. Representative
Connie Mack IV
Republican

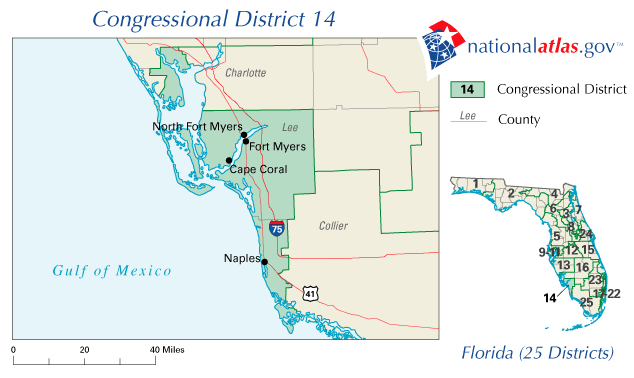

This seat had been vacant since Porter Goss resigned on September 23 to serve as the director of the CIA. Republican Connie Mack IV won the open seat against Democratic candidate Robert Neeld in this solidly conservative district. Mack, the son of former U.S. Senator Connie Mack III, was aided by name recognition and fundraising connections en route to an easy victory.

=== Predictions ===
Source	Ranking	As of
The Cook Political Report	Safe R	October 29, 2004
Sabato's Crystal Ball	Safe R	November 1, 2004

=== Results ===
Florida's 14th congressional district election, 2004
Party	Candidate	Votes	%
Republican	Connie Mack IV	226,662	67.6
Democratic	Robert M. Neeld	108,672	32.4
Total votes		335,334	100.00
Republican hold			

== District 15 ==
2004 Florida's 15th congressional district election
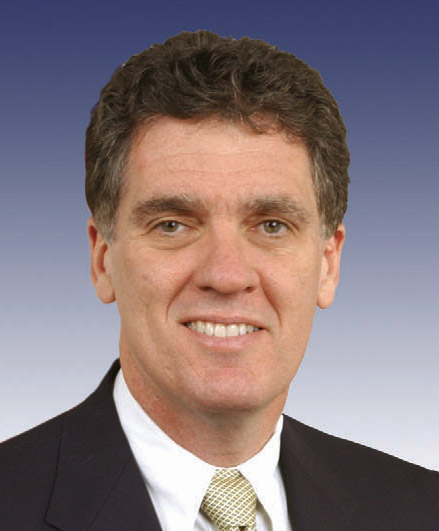

Candidate	Dave Weldon	Simon Pristoop
Party	Republican	Democratic
Popular vote	210,388	111,538
Percentage	65.4%	34.6%
- County results Weldon: 50–60% 60–70% 70–80%
U.S. Representative before election
Dave Weldon (inc.)
Republican
Elected U.S. Representative
Dave Weldon
Republican

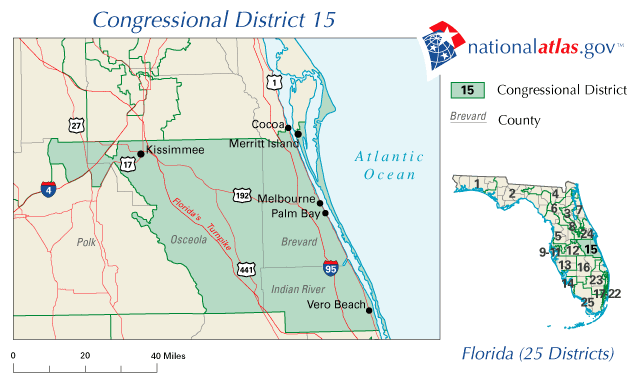

Incumbent Republican Dave Weldon sought election to a sixth term in Congress. Weldon defeated the Democratic candidate, retired physicist Simon Pristoop, with 65% of the vote.

=== Predictions ===
Source	Ranking	As of
The Cook Political Report	Safe R	October 29, 2004
Sabato's Crystal Ball	Safe R	November 1, 2004

=== Results ===
Florida's 15th congressional district election, 2004
Party	Candidate	Votes	%
Republican	Dave Weldon (inc.)	210,388	65.4
Democratic	Simon Pristoop	111,538	34.6
Total votes		321,926	100.00
Republican hold			

== District 16 ==
2004 Florida's 16th congressional district election
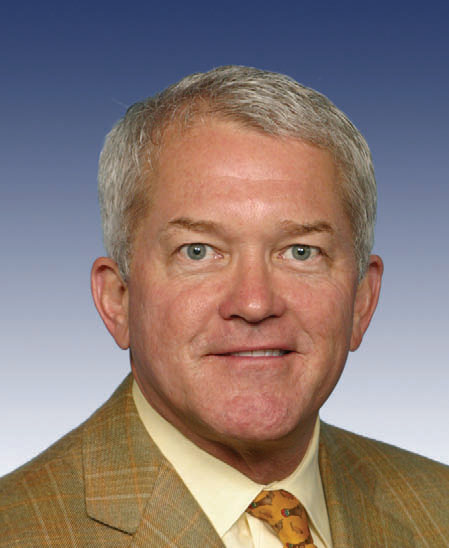

Candidate	Mark Foley	Jeff Fisher
Party	Republican	Democratic
Popular vote	215,563	101,247
Percentage	68.0%	32.0%
- County results Foley: 60–70% 70–80%
U.S. Representative before election
Mark Foley (inc.)
Republican
Elected U.S. Representative
Mark Foley
Republican

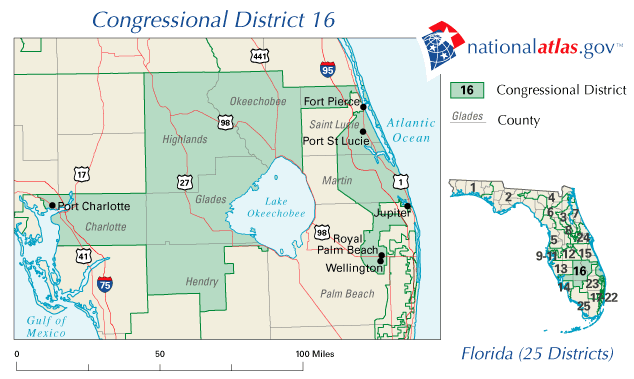

Incumbent Republican Mark Foley ran for a sixth term. He defeated Democrat Jeff Fisher by a wide margin.

=== Predictions ===
Source	Ranking	As of
The Cook Political Report	Safe R	October 29, 2004
Sabato's Crystal Ball	Safe R	November 1, 2004

=== Results ===
Florida's 16th congressional district election, 2004
Party	Candidate	Votes	%
Republican	Mark Foley (inc.)	215,563	68.0
Democratic	Jeff Fisher	101,247	32.0
Total votes		316,810	100.00
Republican hold			

== District 17 ==
2004 Florida's 17th congressional district election
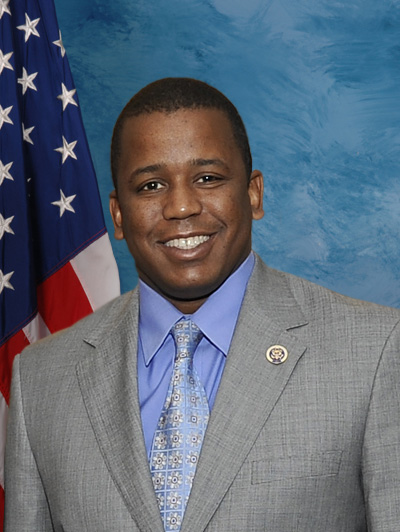
Candidate	Kendrick Meek
Party	Democratic
Popular vote	178,690
Percentage	99.6%
- County results Meek: 90–100% 100–100%
U.S. Representative before election
Kendrick Meek (inc.)
Democratic
Elected U.S. Representative
Kendrick Meek
Democratic

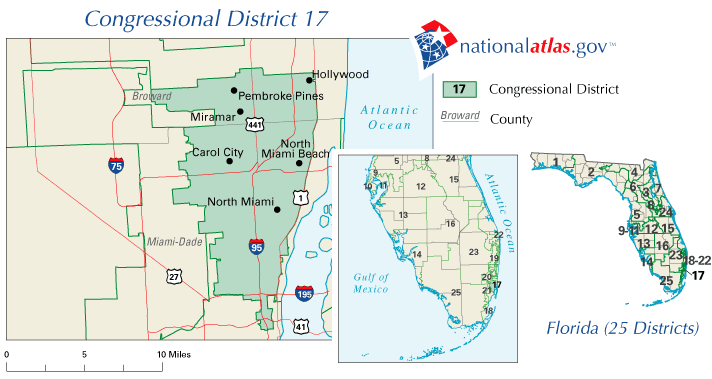

Incumbent Democrat Kendrick Meek was re-elected to a second term in this heavily Democratic district. He faced no Republican challenger.

=== Predictions ===
Source	Ranking	As of
The Cook Political Report	Safe D	October 29, 2004
Sabato's Crystal Ball	Safe D	November 1, 2004

=== Results ===
Florida's 17th congressional district election, 2004
Party	Candidate	Votes	%
Democratic	Kendrick Meek (inc.)	178,690	99.6
Independent	Omari Musa (write-in)	734	0.4
Total votes		179,424	100.00
Democratic hold			

== District 18 ==
2004 Florida's 18th congressional district election
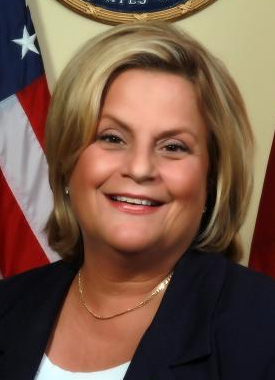

Candidate	Ileana Ros-Lehtinen	Sam Sheldon
Party	Republican	Democratic
Popular vote	143,647	78,281
Percentage	64.7%	35.3%
- County results Ros-Lehtinen: 50–60% 60–70%
U.S. Representative before election
Ileana Ros-Lehtinen (inc.)
Republican
Elected U.S. Representative
Ileana Ros-Lehtinen
Republican

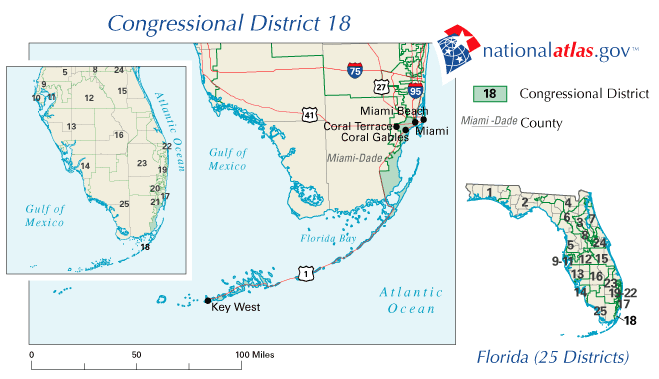

Incumbent Republican Congresswoman Ileana Ros-Lehtinen sought a ninth term and easily defeated Democratic nominee Sam Sheldon.

=== Predictions ===
Source	Ranking	As of
The Cook Political Report	Safe R	October 29, 2004
Sabato's Crystal Ball	Safe R	November 1, 2004

=== Results ===
Florida's 18th congressional district election, 2004
Party	Candidate	Votes	%
Republican	Ileana Ros-Lehtinen (inc.)	143,647	64.7
Democratic	Sam Sheldon	78,281	35.3
Total votes		221,928	100.00
Republican hold			

== District 19 ==
2004 Florida's 19th congressional district election
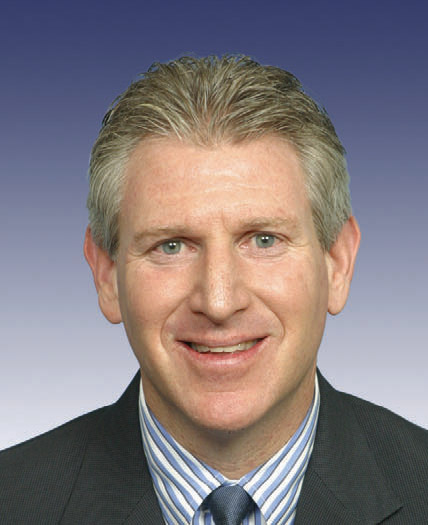
Candidate	Robert Wexler
Party	Democratic
Popular vote	Unopposed
Percentage
U.S. Representative before election
Robert Wexler
Democratic
Elected U.S. Representative
Robert Wexler
Democratic

=== Predictions ===
Source	Ranking	As of
The Cook Political Report	Safe D	October 29, 2004
Sabato's Crystal Ball	Safe D	November 1, 2004

=== Results ===
Results

Florida's 19th congressional district election, 2004
Party	Candidate	Votes	%
Democratic	Robert Wexler	Unopposed	

== District 20 ==
2004 Florida's 20th congressional district election
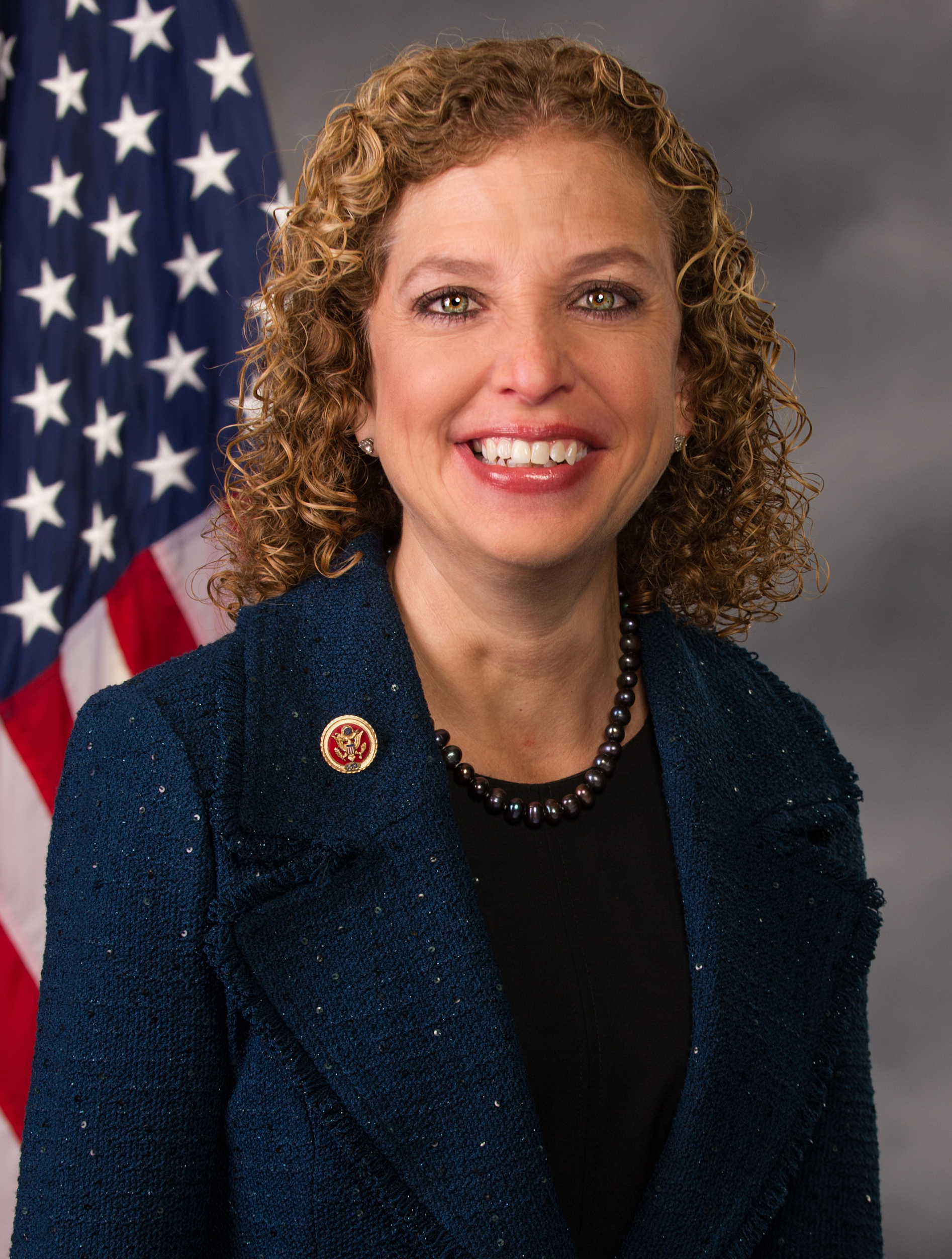

Candidate	Debbie Wasserman Schultz	Margaret Hostetter
Party	Democratic	Republican
Popular vote	191,195	81,213
Percentage	70.2%	29.8%
- County results Schultz: 60–70% 70–80%
U.S. Representative before election
Peter Deutsch
Democratic
Elected U.S. Representative
Debbie Wasserman Schultz
Democratic

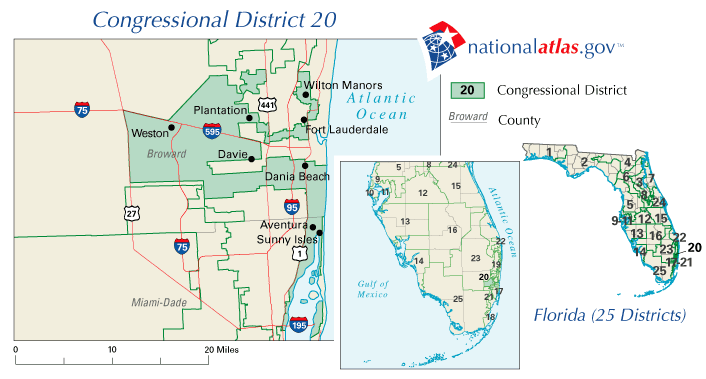

Democratic incumbent Peter Deutsch decided to run for the U.S. Senate instead of seeking re-election. Democrat Debbie Wasserman Schultz won the open seat with over 70% of the vote.

=== Predictions ===
Source	Ranking	As of
The Cook Political Report	Safe D	October 29, 2004
Sabato's Crystal Ball	Safe D	November 1, 2004

=== Results ===
Florida's 20th congressional district election, 2004
Party	Candidate	Votes	%
Democratic	Debbie Wasserman Schultz	191,195	70.2
Republican	Margaret Hostetter	81,213	29.8
Total votes		272,408	100.00
Democratic hold			

== District 21 ==
2004 Florida's 21st congressional district election
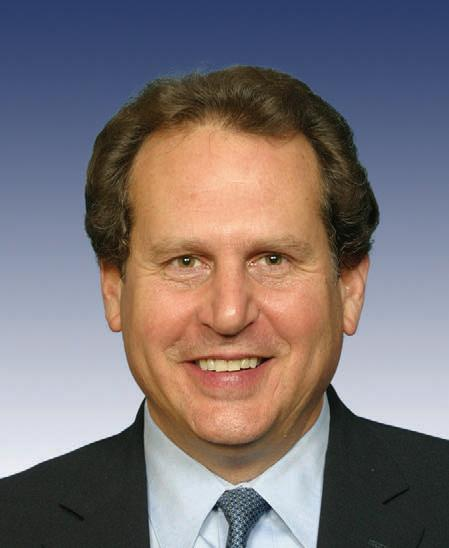

Candidate	Lincoln Diaz-Balart	Robert E. Johnson
Party	Republican	Libertarian
Popular vote	146,507	54,736
Percentage	72.8%	27.2%
- County results Diaz-balart: 60–70% 70–80%
U.S. Representative before election
Lincoln Diaz-Balart (inc.)
Republican
Elected U.S. Representative
Lincoln Diaz-Balart
Republican

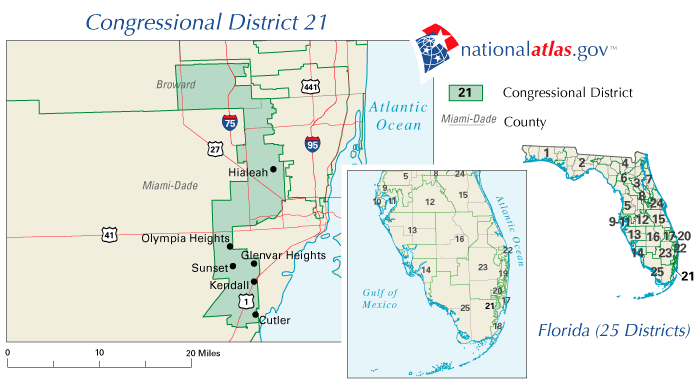

Incumbent Republican Lincoln Diaz-Balart ran for a seventh term in this suburban district. Diaz-Balart faced no Democratic challenger and easily won re-election.

=== Predictions ===
Source	Ranking	As of
The Cook Political Report	Safe R	October 29, 2004
Sabato's Crystal Ball	Safe R	November 1, 2004

=== Results ===
Florida's 21st congressional district election, 2004
Party	Candidate	Votes	%
Republican	Lincoln Diaz-Balart (inc.)	146,507	72.8
Libertarian	Robert E. Johnson	54,736	27.2
Total votes		201,243	100.00
Republican hold			

== District 22 ==
2004 Florida's 22nd congressional district election
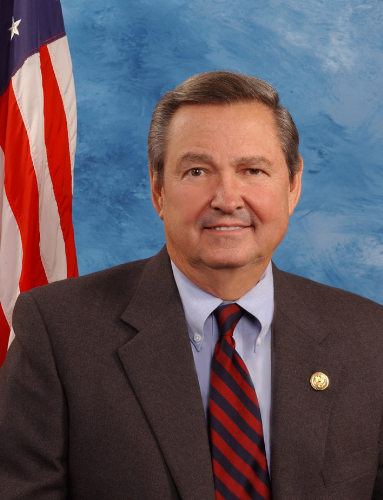

Candidate	Clay Shaw	Jim Stork
Party	Republican	Democratic
Popular vote	192,581	108,258
Percentage	62.8%	35.3%
- County results Shaw: 60–70%
U.S. Representative before election
Clay Shaw (inc.)
Republican
Elected U.S. Representative
Clay Shaw
Republican

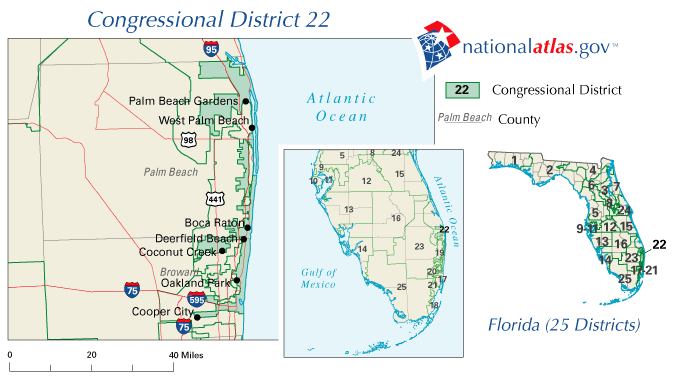

Incumbent Republican Clay Shaw ran for a thirteenth term. Jim Stork was the Democratic nominee, but withdrew from the race before election night, citing health issues. Stork's name remained on the ballot, but votes for Stork were counted for Robin Rorapaugh, a staffer for Congressman Peter Deutsch. Shaw easily won re-election.

=== Predictions ===
Source	Ranking	As of
The Cook Political Report	Safe R	October 29, 2004
Sabato's Crystal Ball	Safe R	November 1, 2004

=== Results ===
Florida's 22nd congressional district election, 2004
Party	Candidate	Votes	%
Republican	Clay Shaw (inc.)	192,581	62.8
Democratic	Jim Stork	108,258	35.3
Constitution	Jack McLain	5,260	1.7
Independent	Don Kennedy (write-in)	627	0.2
Total votes		306,726	100.00
Republican hold			

== District 23 ==
2004 Florida's 23rd congressional district election
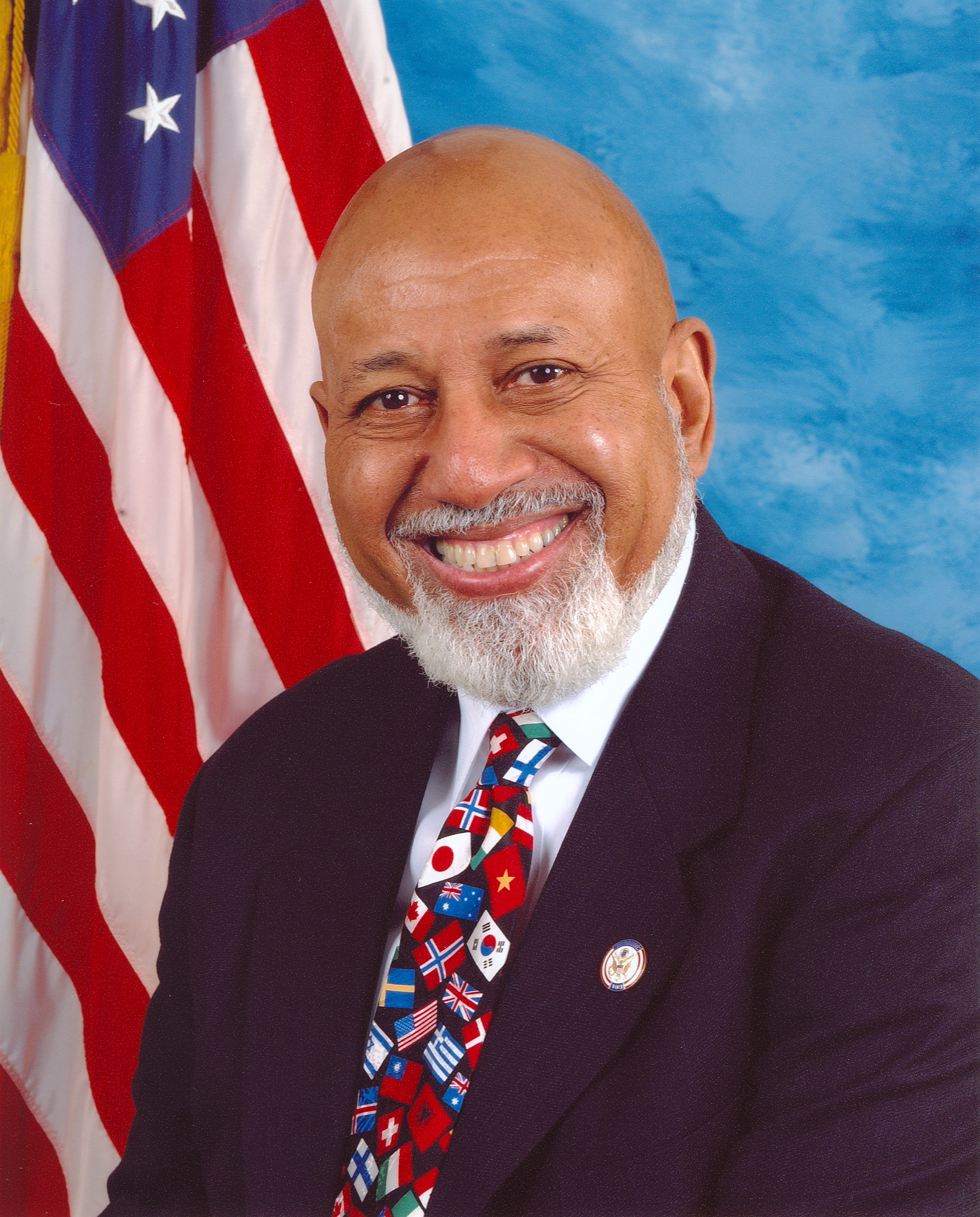
Candidate	Alcee L. Hastings
Party	Democratic
Popular vote	Unopposed
Percentage
U.S. Representative before election
Alcee Hastings
Democratic
Elected U.S. Representative
Alcee L. Hastings
Democratic

=== Predictions ===
Source	Ranking	As of
The Cook Political Report	Safe D	October 29, 2004
Sabato's Crystal Ball	Safe D	November 1, 2004

=== Results ===
Results

Florida's 23rd congressional district election, 2004
Party	Candidate	Votes	%
Democratic	Alcee L. Hastings	Unopposed	

== District 24 ==
2004 Florida's 24th congressional district election
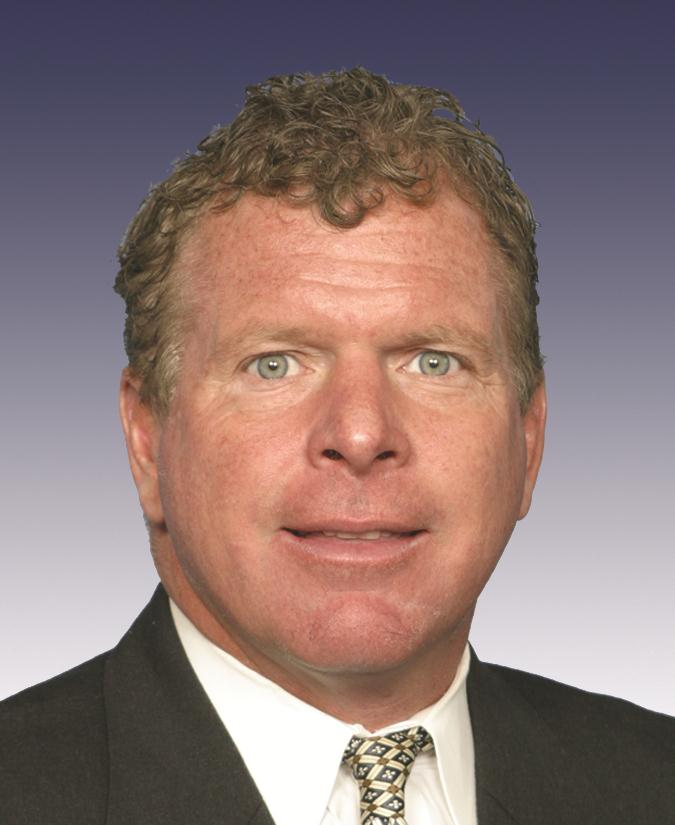
Candidate	Tom Feeney
Party	Republican
Popular vote	Unopposed
Percentage
U.S. Representative before election
Tom Feeney
Republican
Elected U.S. Representative
Tom Feeney
Republican

=== Predictions ===
Source	Ranking	As of
The Cook Political Report	Safe R	October 29, 2004
Sabato's Crystal Ball	Safe R	November 1, 2004

=== Results ===
Results

Florida's 24th congressional district election, 2004
Party	Candidate	Votes	%
Republican	Tom Feeney	Unopposed	

== District 25 ==
2004 Florida's 25th congressional district election
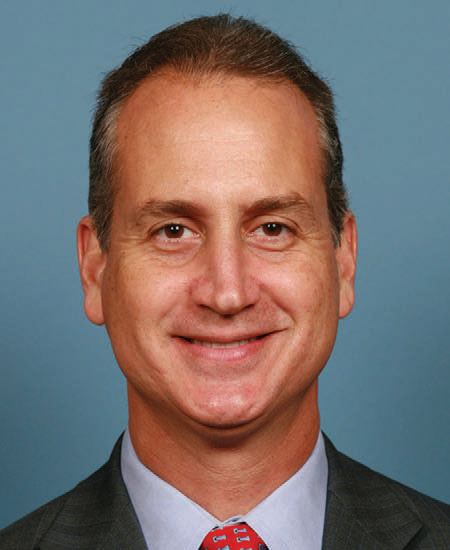
Candidate	Mario Diaz-Balart
Party	Republican
Popular vote	Unopposed
Percentage
U.S. Representative before election
Mario Díaz-Balart
Republican
Elected U.S. Representative
Mario Diaz-Balart
Republican

=== Predictions ===
Source	Ranking	As of
The Cook Political Report	Safe R	October 29, 2004
Sabato's Crystal Ball	Safe R	November 1, 2004

=== Results ===
Results

Florida's 25th congressional district election, 2004
Party	Candidate	Votes	%
Republican	Mario Diaz-Balart	Unopposed	
