= Florida Department of Business and Professional Regulation =

State agency of Florida

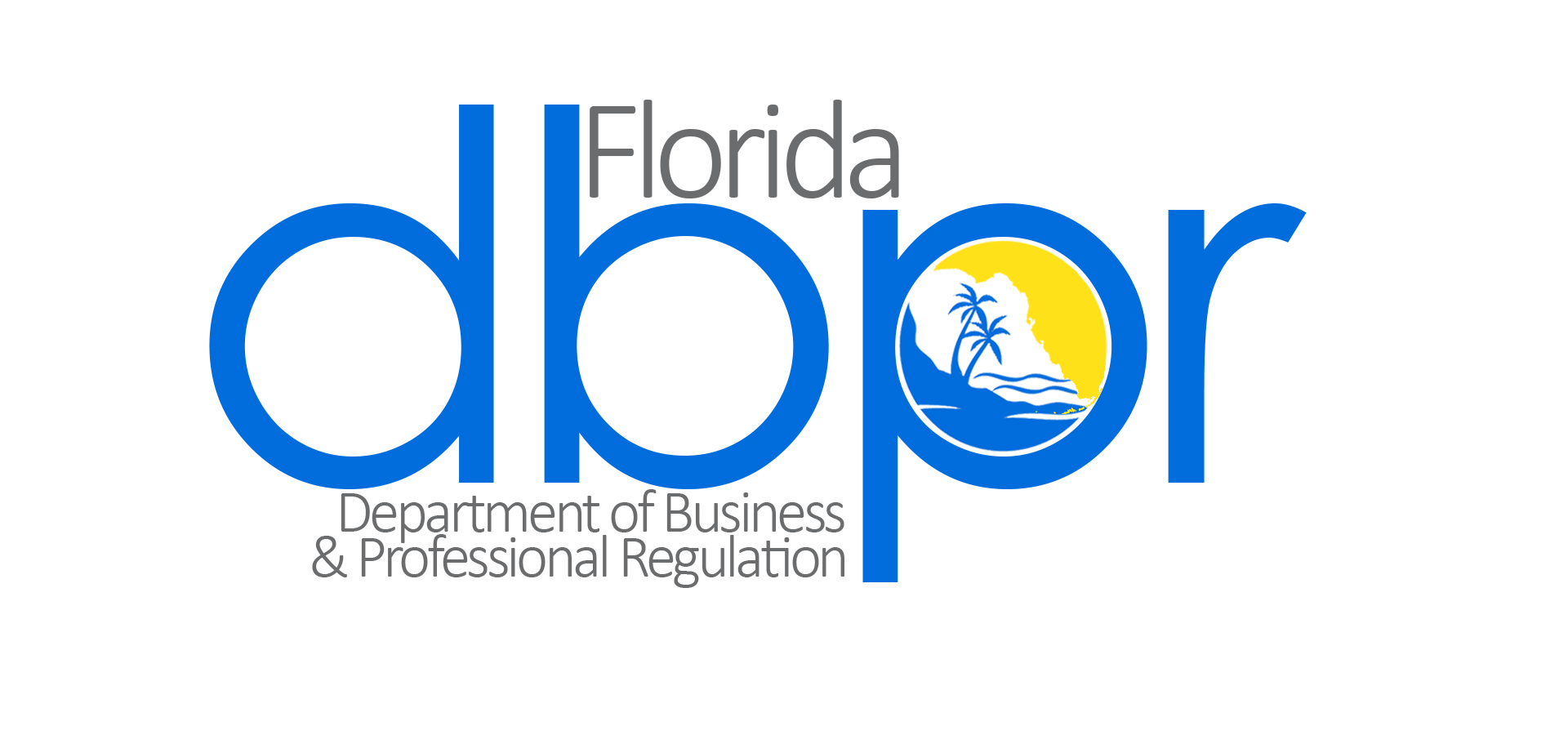

Agency overview
- Jurisdiction: Government of Florida
- Headquarters: 2601 N. Blair Stone Road, Tallahassee, Florida 32399
- Motto: License Efficiently. Regulate Fairly.
- Employees: 1,517 (2022)
- Annual budget: US$157,922,881 (FY 2022-2023)
- Agency executive: Melanie S. Griffin, Secretary
- Website: www.myfloridalicense.com

The Department of Business and Professional Regulation (DBPR) is the agency charged with licensing and regulating more than 1.6 million businesses and professionals in the State of Florida, such as alcohol, beverage & tobacco, barbers/cosmetologists, condominiums, spas, hotels and restaurants, real estate agents and appraisers, and veterinarians, among many other industries.

The Department is under the executive branch of the Governor and is governed by Chapter 120, F.S. The Department is structured according to the requirements of Section 20.165, F.S.

On June 30, 2020 Governor Ron DeSantis signed “The Occupational Freedom and Opportunity Act” (HB 1193) which eliminates barriers of entry to certain professions licensed by the Florida Department of Business and Professional Regulation (DPBR) by adding endorsement and reciprocity provisions, removing supplemental business licenses and corresponding license fees, reducing licensure education requirements, and eliminating other licensure and registration requirements.

== Office of the Secretary ==
The Secretary and head of the Department of Business and Professional Regulation is appointed by the Florida Governor and confirmed by the Florida Senate. There is no set term limit; the Secretary serves at the pleasure of the Governor. The Secretary is responsible for planning, directing, coordinating, and executing the powers, duties and functions vested in the Department, its divisions, bureaus and other subunits.

The current Secretary is Melanie S. Griffin. Secretary Griffin has held the position since January 1, 2022, and was confirmed by the Florida Senate on March 9, 2022.
