= Chipola College =

Public college in Marianna, Florida, US

Coordinates: 30.787468°N 85.232784°W

- Former name: Chipola Junior College
- Type: Public college
- Established: 1947; 79 years ago
- Parent institution: Florida College System
- President: Sarah Clemmons
- Students: 2,274
- Location: Marianna, Florida, U.S.
- Campus: Rural
- Language: English
- Colors: Blue and gold
- Sporting affiliations: NJCAA Region 8, Panhandle Conference
- Mascot: Indians
- Website: www.chipola.edu

Chipola College is a public college in Marianna, Florida, United States. It is part of the Florida College System.

== History ==
The school was founded in 1947 as Chipola Junior College. Its name was changed in 2003 after the college developed several bachelor's degree programs.

== Campus ==
The college was named for the Chipola River, which is located less than a mile from the campus. In 2012, the school opened a $16 million, 56,000 square foot center for the arts, including two theaters.

== Academics ==
The college offers degree programs leading to the award of Associate of Arts and Associate of Science degrees, as well as Bachelor of Science degrees in business, education, and nursing.

== Student life ==
The Brain Bowl team has won nine state championships and three national championships.

=== Sports ===
The college's athletic teams compete in the Panhandle Conference of the Florida State College Activities Association, a body of the National Junior College Athletic Association Region 8.

==== Basketball ====
The men's basketball program has won more state basketball championships under one coach (seven for Milton H. Johnson) and in total (nine) than any other junior-college basketball program in Florida. In the 2003–2004 and 2004–05 seasons, it finished fifth and third in the nation respectively and, in 2005, received its first-ever No. 1 national ranking.

In 2004–2005, the basketball program won state championships in both men's and women's basketball. The women's basketball team repeated its state championship in 2005–2006, finishing fourth in the nation. In 2006–2007, the men's and women's teams both won the state championship.

To finish the 2007 season, the men's program finished 33–3 with a runner-up finish in the NJCAA National Championship game. During that season, the Indians were ranked #1 in the national poll for 10 straight weeks.

== Notable alumni ==
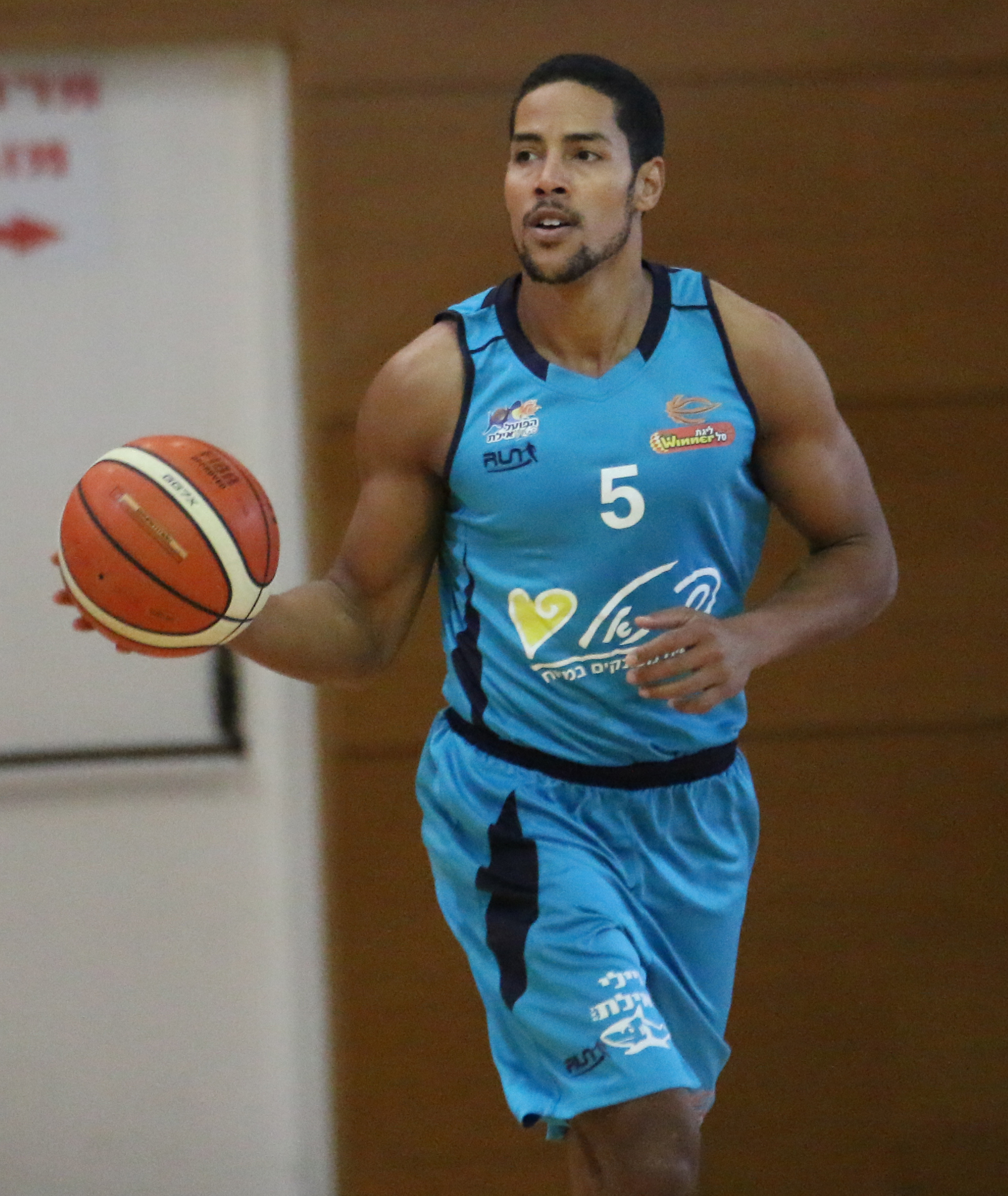
Chanan Colman

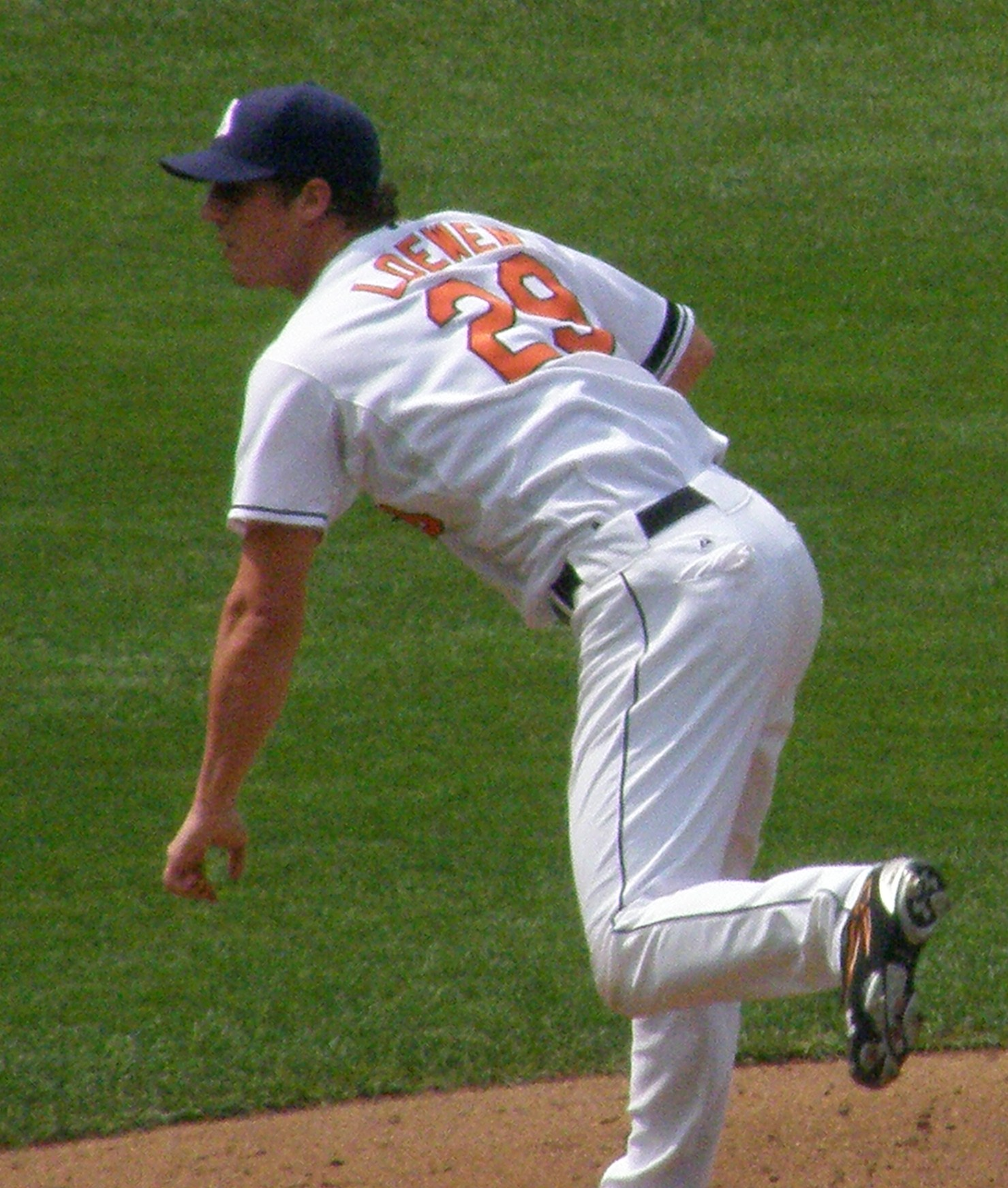
Adam Loewen

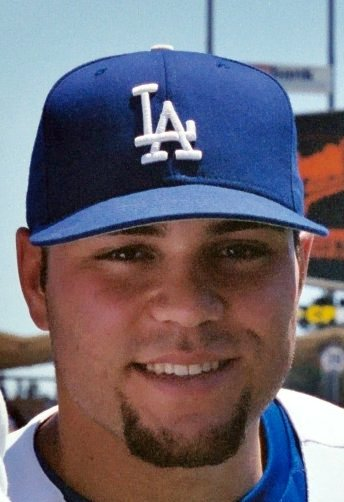
Russell Martin

Alumnus	Notability
José Bautista	Professional baseball player
Justin Brownlee	Professional basketball player
José Caballero	Professional baseball player
Marti Coley	Former member of the Florida House of Representatives
Chanan Colman	Professional basketball player
Patrick Corbin	Professional baseball player
Adam Duvall	Professional baseball player
Bowden Francis	Professional baseball player
Mat Gamel	Professional baseball player
Ivan Johnson	Professional baseball player
Mary Elizabeth Lado	Professional figure competitor
Adam Loewen	Professional baseball player
Russell Martin	Professional baseball player
Casey Mitchell	Professional basketball player
Ricky Polston	Justice on the Florida Supreme Court
Chris Porter	Professional basketball player
Walker Russell Jr.	Professional basketball player
Buck Showalter	Professional baseball manager
Elam Stoltzfus	Environmental filmmaker and cinematographer with Live Oak Production Group
Franklin van Gurp	Professional baseball player
Darrell Williams	Professional basketball player
Eric Yelding	Former professional baseball player
