= Robert Harden =

American politician (born 1960)

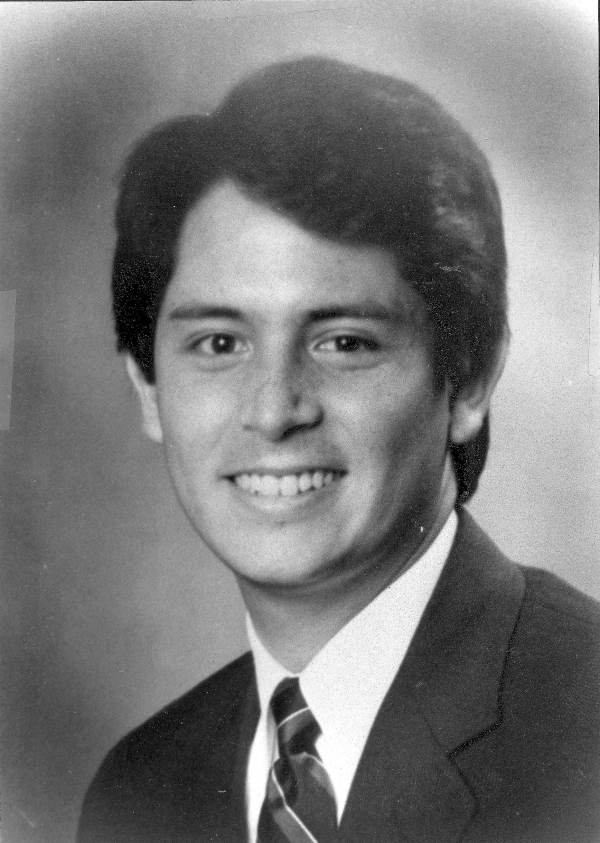

Member of the Florida Senate from the 7th district
- In office November 3, 1992 – November 5, 1996
- Preceded by: Vince Bruner (redistricting)
- Succeeded by: Charlie Clary

Member of the Florida House of Representatives from the 5th district
- In office November 4, 1986 – November 3, 1992
- Preceded by: James Ward
- Succeeded by: James P. Kerrigan (redistricting)

Personal details
- Born: July 6, 1960 (age 66) Cooperstown, North Dakota, U.S.
- Party: Republican
- Education: Okaloosa-Walton Junior College (A.A.); Florida State University (B.S.)

Robert T. Harden (born July 6, 1960) is an American politician in the state of Florida. A member of the Republican Party, he served as a member of the Florida House of Representatives from the 5th district from 1986 to 1992 and as a member of the Florida Senate from the 7th district from 1992 to 1996. He also served as a member for the 7th district of the Florida Senate.

== Life and career ==
Harden was born in Cooperstown, North Dakota. He attended Okaloosa-Walton Junior College and Florida State University.

In 1986, Harden was elected to represent the 5th district of the Florida House of Representatives, succeeding James Ward. He served until 1992, when he was succeeded by Sam Mitchell. In the same year, he was elected to represent the 7th district of the Florida Senate, serving until 1996.
