= Larry Cretul =

American politician

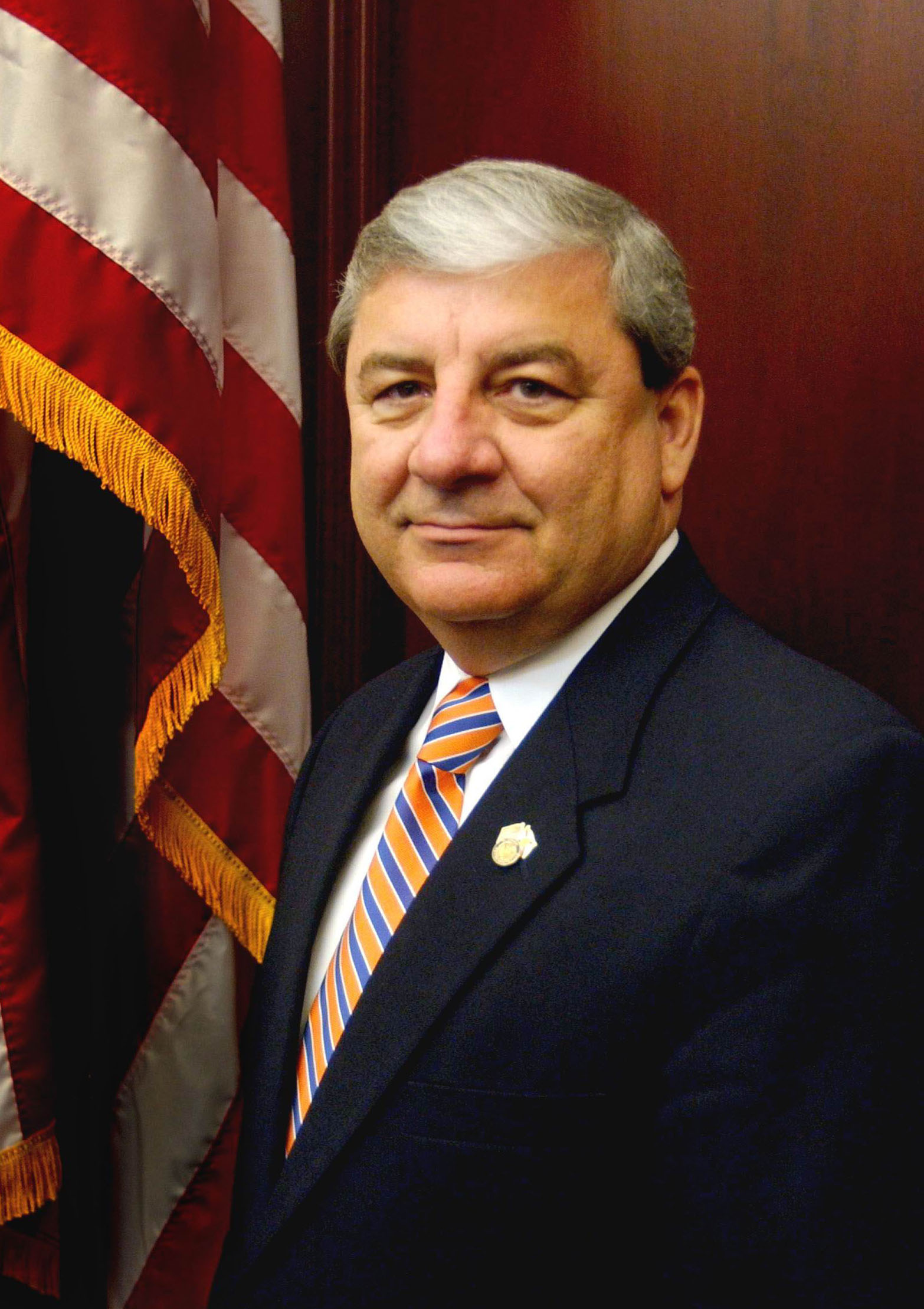

96th Speaker of the Florida House of Representatives
- In office March 3, 2009 – November 16, 2010
- Preceded by: Ray Sansom
- Succeeded by: Dean Cannon

Speaker Pro Tempore of the Florida House of Representatives
- In office November 18, 2008 – March 2, 2009
- Preceded by: Marty Bowen
- Succeeded by: Ronald Reagan

Member of the Florida House of Representatives from the 22nd district
- In office November 5, 2002 – November 2, 2010
- Preceded by: Perry McGriff
- Succeeded by: Keith Perry

Personal details
- Born: January 18, 1948 (age 78)
- Party: Republican
- Spouse: Lana J. Delves
- Children: 2
- Profession: Real Estate Broker

Military service
- Allegiance: United States
- Branch/service: United States Navy
- Years of service: 1967–1971

Larry Cretul (born 18 January 1948) is a Florida real estate broker and Republican politician who served as Speaker of the Florida House of Representatives from 2009 to 2010. He represented House District 22, based in Ocala, from 2002 to 2010.

Cretul was subsequently elected Speaker Pro Tempore of the State House on November 18, 2008. On January 30, 2009, Speaker Ray Sansom announced he was "recusing" himself from his duties as Speaker due to a scandal over accepting an unadvertised job at Northwest Florida State College. Under the rule allowing him to recuse himself, Sansom named Cretul acting Speaker until Sansom could return. Sansom and Cretul are roommates in Tallahassee while the state House is in session.

However, on February 2, just minutes before the Republican caucus was due to oust him, Sansom resigned as House Republican leader, a post which automatically made him Speaker. Cretul was unanimously elected his successor and was named Speaker at the start of the legislative session on March 3.

Representative Cretul was born on January 18, 1948, in Trenton, Michigan. He served in the U.S. Navy from 1967 to 1971, including a tour aboard USS Forrestal. He moved to Florida in 1971. He attended Lawrence Technological University. He was elected to the Marion County Commission in 1994 and was re-elected 1998. He was first elected to the Florida House in 2002, and subsequently re-elected to three more terms. He is married to Lana J. Delves of Taylor, Michigan and they have two children, Brian and Scott.

== Sources ==
- Project Vote Smart profile
- Florida House of Representatives Profile
- Leary, Alex; Steve Bosquet and Marc Caputo. State House is in chaos as Sansom steps aside. St. Petersburg Times, 2009-01-30.
- Fla. House Speaker Ray Sansom Resigns. Associated Press via WFOR-TV, 2009-02-03.
