= Florida's 5th House of Representatives district =

American legislative district

Florida's 5th State House of Representatives district
Representative
Shane Abbott; R–DeFuniak Springs
- Demographics: 81.6% White; 13.4% Black; 4.1% Hispanic; 0.6% Asian; 0.9% Native American; 0.1% Hawaiian/Pacific Islander; 1.3% Other
- Population (2010) • Voting age: 159,198; 125,985

Florida's 5th House district elects one member of the Florida House of Representatives. The district is represented by Shane Abbott. This district is located in the Florida panhandle, and encompasses part of the Emerald Coast. The district covers all of Walton County, Holmes County, Washington County, Jackson County, and part of northern Bay County. The largest city in the district is Marianna. As of the 2010 census, the district's population is 159,198.

This district contains Chipola College, located in Marianna, and the Baptist College of Florida, located in Graceville.

== Representatives from 1967 to the present ==
Representatives by party affiliation
Party	Representatives
Democratic	6
Republican	6

#	Name	Term of service	Residence	Political party
1	Ed Fortune	1967–1972	Pace	Democratic
2	Jerry Melvin	1972–1978	Fort Walton Beach	Democratic
3	Ken Boles	1978–1982	Fort Walton Beach	Democratic
4	James Ward	1982–1986	Fort Walton Beach	Democratic
5	Robert Harden	1986–1992	Fort Walton Beach	Republican
6	Sam Mitchell	1992–1994	Vernon	Democratic
7	Durell Peaden	1994–2000	Crestview	Democratic (Note: Peaden was elected as a member of the Democratic Party, and switched to the Republican Party in 1997.)
8	Don Brown	2000–2008	DeFuniak Springs	Republican
9	Brad Drake	2008–2012	DeFuniak Springs	Republican
10	Marti Coley	2012–2014	Marianna	Republican
11	Brad Drake	2014–2022	DeFuniak Springs	Republican
11	Shane Abbott	2022–present	DeFuniak Springs	Republican

== See also ==
- Florida's 2nd Senate district
- Florida's 1st congressional district
- Florida's 2nd congressional district
