= James P. Kerrigan =

American politician (1927–2016)

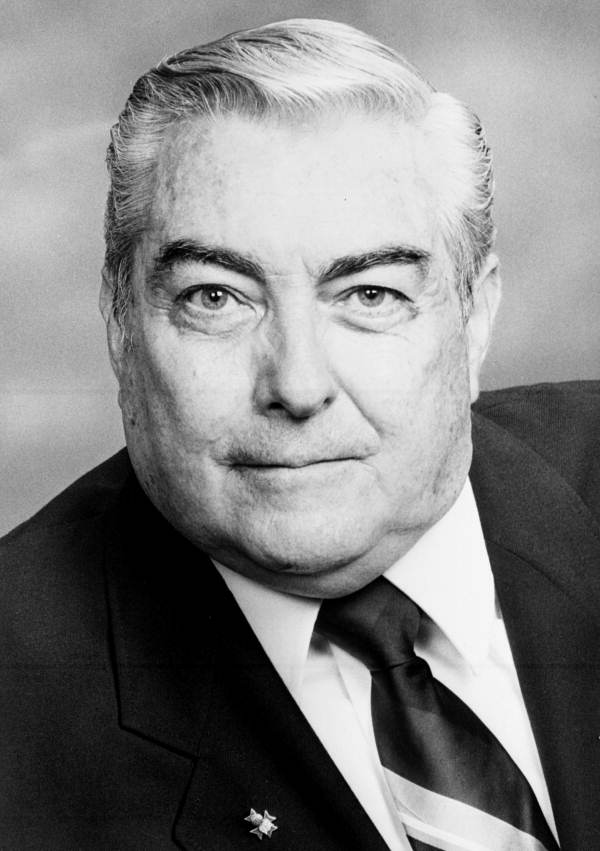
- Kerrigan in 1992

Member of the Florida House of Representatives from the 4th district
- In office 1992–1994
- Preceded by: Bolley Johnson
- Succeeded by: Jerry Melvin

Personal details
- Born: March 7, 1927 Yorkville, New York, U.S.
- Died: July 12, 2016 (aged 89)
- Party: Republican

James P. Kerrigan (March 7, 1927 – July 12, 2016) was an American politician. He served as a Republican member for the 4th district of the Florida House of Representatives.

== Early life ==
Kerrigan was born in Yorkville, New York.

== Career ==
In 1992, Kerrigan was elected to represent the 4th district of the Florida House of Representatives, succeeding Bolley Johnson. He served until 1994, when he was succeeded by Jerry Melvin.

== Death ==
Kerrigan died on July 12, 2016, at the age of 89.
