= Charlie Clary =

American politician (born 1950)

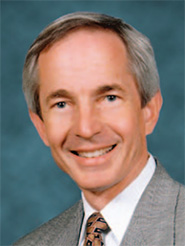

President Pro Tempore of the Florida Senate
- In office November 16, 2004 – November 7, 2006
- Preceded by: Alex Díaz de la Portilla
- Succeeded by: Lisa Carlton

Member of the Florida Senate
- In office November 5, 1996 – November 7, 2006
- Preceded by: Robert Harden
- Succeeded by: Don Gaetz
- Constituency: 7th District (1996–2002); 4th District (2002–2006)

Personal details
- Born: June 24, 1950 (age 76) Crestview, Florida, U.S.
- Spouse: Beth Graham
- Children: Joanna and Laura
- Education: Auburn University (B.A.)
- Occupation: Architect

Charlie Clary (born June 24, 1950) is a Republican politician who served as a member of the Florida Senate from 1996 to 2006, and as President Pro Tempore of the Senate from 2004 to 2006.

== Early life ==
Clary was born in Crestview, Florida, and attended Auburn University, where he graduated with his bachelor's degree in architecture and environmental design in 1977. He served as a member of the Destin City Council from 1990 to 1996.

== Florida Senate ==
In 1996, Republican State Senator Robert Harden declined to seek re-election, and Clary ran to succeed him in the 7th District, which stretched from Panama City to Pensacola.

In the Republican primary, he ran against former State Representative Lois Benson, former Bay County Commissioner Rick Seltzer, retired rocket scientist Mac McMillan, and talk show host Joe Webb. Clary placed second in the primary with 30 percent behind Benson, who won 34 percent. However, because Benson did not receive a majority of the vote, a runoff election was held between the two of them.

In the runoff election, Clary narrowly defeated Benson, receiving 51 percent of the vote to her 49 percent. He faced Democratic nominee Richard "Beef" Harden, an Air Force Reserve pilot. Clary defeated Haddad in a landslide, winning 60 percent of the vote.

Clary ran for re-election in 2000 and was unopposed.

In 2002, following the reconfiguration of Florida's state legislative districts after the 2000 census, Clary ran for re-election in the 4th District, which included most of the territory he previously represented. He was challenged in the Republican primary by State Representative Jerry Melvin. He defeated Melvin for renomination, winning 55 percent of the vote, and his only opponent in the general election, a write-in candidate, dropped out of the race, allowing him to win re-election unopposed. He was selected as the President Pro Tempore of the Senate for the 2004–2006 session.

Clary was unable to seek re-election in 2006, and was succeeded by Republican Don Gaetz. He initially announced that he would run for Chief Financial Officer in 2006, but dropped out of the race on September 12, 2005, and endorsed State Senate President Tom Lee.
