= General Maney =

General Maney may refer to:

- George Earl Maney (1826–1901), Confederate States Army brigadier general
- Patt Maney (born 1948), U.S. Army brigadier general
