= Florida's 4th House of Representatives district =

American legislative district

Florida's 4th State House of Representatives district
Representative
Patt Maney; R–Shalimar
- Demographics: 79.8% White; 9.9% Black; 7.3% Hispanic; 3.2% Asian; 0.5% Native American; 0.2% Hawaiian/Pacific Islander; 2.2% Other
- Population (2010) • Voting age: 158,781; 123,651

Florida's 4th House district elects one member of the Florida House of Representatives. The district is represented by Patt Maney. This district is located in the Florida Panhandle, and encompasses part of the Emerald Coast, as well as part of the Crestview metropolitan area. The district covers southern Okaloosa County. The largest city in the district is Crestview. As of the 2010 census, the district's population is 158,781.

This district contains Northwest Florida State College, located in Niceville. The district also contains Destin–Fort Walton Beach Airport, as well as Eglin Air Force Base.

There was a vacancy between February 21, 2010, and April 13, 2010, as the incumbent, Ray Sansom, resigned due to a corruption scandal. Lawyer Matt Gaetz won a special election to fill the seat.

Ray Sansom served as Speaker of the Florida House of Representatives from 2008 to 2009.

== Representatives from 1967 to the present ==
Representatives by party affiliation
Party	Representatives
Republican	6
Democratic	3

Representatives from Florida's 4th district
#	Name	Term of service	Residence	Political party	Counties represented
1	Jim Reeves	1967–1972	Pensacola	Democratic	Escambia
2	Ed Fortune	1972–1978	Pace	Democratic	Escambia, Okaloosa, Santa Rosa, Walton
3	Bolley Johnson	1978–1992	Milton	Democratic	Escambia, Okaloosa, Santa Rosa, Walton (1978–1982); Escambia, Santa Rosa, Walton (1982–1992)
4	James P. Kerrigan	1992–1994	Gulf Breeze	Republican	Escambia, Okaloosa, Santa Rosa
5	Jerry Melvin	1994–2002	Fort Walton Beach	Republican	Escambia, Okaloosa, Santa Rosa
6	Ray Sansom	2002–2010	Destin	Republican	Okaloosa, Santa Rosa
Vacant 2010
7	Matt Gaetz	2010–2016	Fort Walton Beach	Republican	Okaloosa, Santa Rosa
8	Mel Ponder	2016–2020	Destin	Republican	Okaloosa, Santa Rosa
9	Patt Maney	2020–present	Shalimar	Republican	Okaloosa, Santa Rosa (2020–2022); Okaloosa (2022–present)

== See also ==
- Florida's 1st Senate district
- Florida's 2nd Senate district
- Florida's 1st congressional district
