= Don Brown (Florida politician) =

American politician (born 1951)

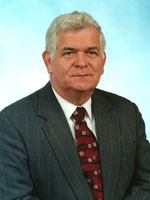

Member of the Florida House of Representatives from the 5th District
- In office November 7, 2000 – November 4, 2008
- Preceded by: Durell Peaden
- Succeeded by: Brad Drake

Personal details
- Born: December 28, 1951 (age 74) DeFuniak Springs, Florida, U.S.
- Party: Republican
- Spouse: Diane Shaw
- Children: Lori Callista Brown, James C. Brown
- Education: Okaloosa-Walton Junior College (A.S.); University of West Florida
- Occupation: insurance agent

Don Brown (born December 28, 1951) is a Republican politician who served as a member of the Florida House of Representatives from the 5th District from 2000 to 2008.

== Early life and career ==
Brown was born in DeFuniak Springs, Florida. He attended Okaloosa-Walton Junior College, receiving his associate degree in 1971, and later attended the University of West Florida. He worked as an insurance agent in DeFuniak Springs, owning and operating First National Insurance Agency.

In 1988, Walton County Commissioner Edward Armbruster resigned from the county commission to unsuccessfully run for Congress against Congressman Earl Hutto. Governor Bob Martinez appointed Brown to serve out the remainder of Armbruster's term representing District 4. Brown ran for re-election in 1990 and was challenged by Armbruster in the Republican primary. He defeated Armbruster by a wide margin in the Republican primary, winning 68 percent of the vote, and faced Democratic nominee Gordon Porter, a real estate auctioneer and general contractor. Porter narrowly defeated Brown, winning 51 percent of the vote to Brown's 49 percent.

== Florida House of Representatives ==
In 1996, Brown ran against Democratic State Representative Durell Peaden in the 5th district, which included Holmes, Okaloosa, Walton, and Washington counties. Peaden defeated Brown by a thin margin, receiving 51 percent of the vote to Brown's 49 percent.

Peaden switched parties after the 1997 legislative session, and was term-limited in 2000, instead successfully running for the State Senate. Brown ran to succeed Peaden, and won the Republican primary in a landslide, defeating O. L. "Ole" Ellis Jr., with 68 percent of the vote. In the general election, he faced the Democratic nominee, Roy Lake, a wealthy attorney who self-funded his campaign. Despite the financial disparity, Brown won the general election by a wide margin, receiving 67 percent of the vote to Lake's 33 percent.

In 2002, following redistricting, the 5th district expanded to include parts of Jackson County, and Brown ran for re-election. He was challenged by Libertarian nominee Robert Glasure, and won re-election in a landslide with 81 percent of the vote. In 2004, Brown defeated Democratic nominee Naomi Melvin by a similar margin, receiving 74 percent of the vote to her 26 percent. Brown faced only write-in opposition in 2006, and won his final term with 99.6 percent of the vote.
