= Ken Boles =

American politician (1933–2022)

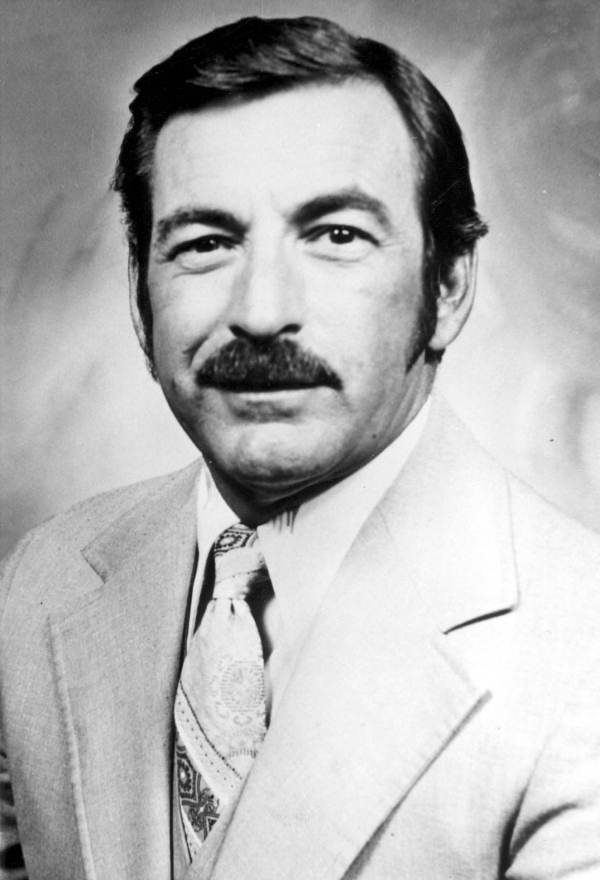

Member of the Florida House of Representatives from the 5th district
- In office November 7, 1978 – November 2, 1982
- Preceded by: Jerry Melvin
- Succeeded by: James Ward

Personal details
- Born: Kenneth Eugene Boles; January 2, 1933 Milton, Florida, U.S.
- Died: August 9, 2022 (aged 89)
- Party: Democratic
- Education: Pensacola Junior College; Alexander Hamilton Institute; United States Saving and Loan Institute
- Occupation: Real estate agent
- Military career
- Allegiance: United States
- Branch: United States Army
- Service years: 1952-1955
- Rank: Sergeant

Kenneth Eugene Boles (January 2, 1933 – August 9, 2022) was an American politician in the state of Florida.

Boles was born in Milton, Florida. He attended Pensacola Junior College, the Alexander Hamilton Institute, and the United States Saving and Loan Institute, and worked in real estate. He served in the Florida House of Representatives from November 7, 1978, to November 2, 1982, as a Democrat, representing the 5th district.

Boles served in the United States Army from 1952 to 1955 during the Korean War era and was a sergeant. He served two years in Germany.

He died on August 9, 2022, at the age of 89. He was buried at Tallahassee National Cemetery.
