= Jere Tolton =

American judge and politician

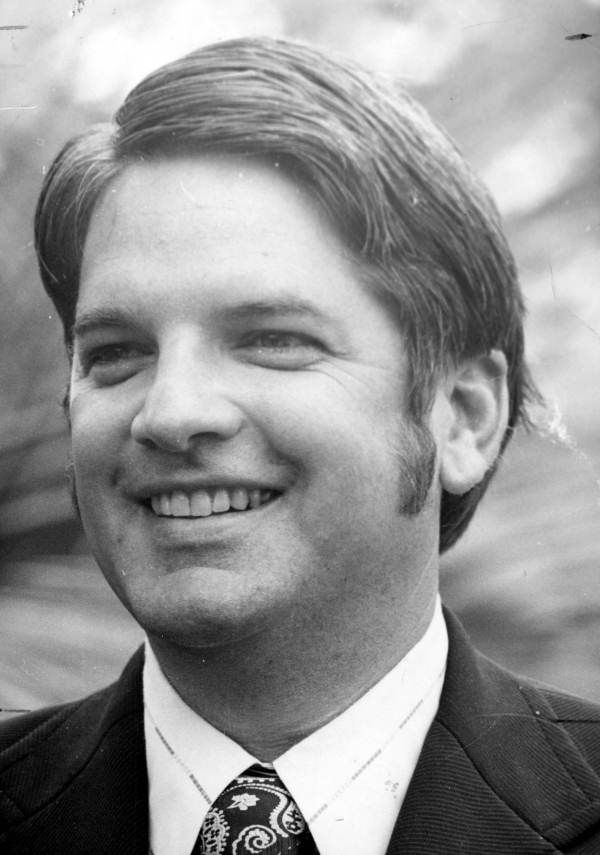
- Tolton in 1974

Member of the Florida House of Representatives from the 6th district
- In office November 7, 1972 – November 2, 1976
- Preceded by: Henton Elmore
- Succeeded by: James Ward

Personal details
- Born: December 9, 1937
- Died: January 24, 2009 (aged 71)
- Party: Democratic
- Spouse: Shari Tolton
- Children: 3
- Education: Washington and Lee University School of Law
- Occupation: Judge

Jere Tolton (December 9, 1937 – January 24, 2009) was an American judge and politician. He served as a Democratic member for the 6th district of the Florida House of Representatives.

== Life and career ==
Tolton attended Washington and Lee University School of Law. He was a newspaper reporter.

In 1972, Tolton was elected to the 6th district of the Florida House of Representatives, succeeding Henton Elmore. He served until 1976, when he was succeeded by James Ward. In the same year, Tolton was appointed by Florida Governor Reubin Askew to serve a circuit court judge for Florida's First Judicial Court, serving until 2007.

Tolton died in January 2009, at the age of 71.
