= Mel Ponder =

College President

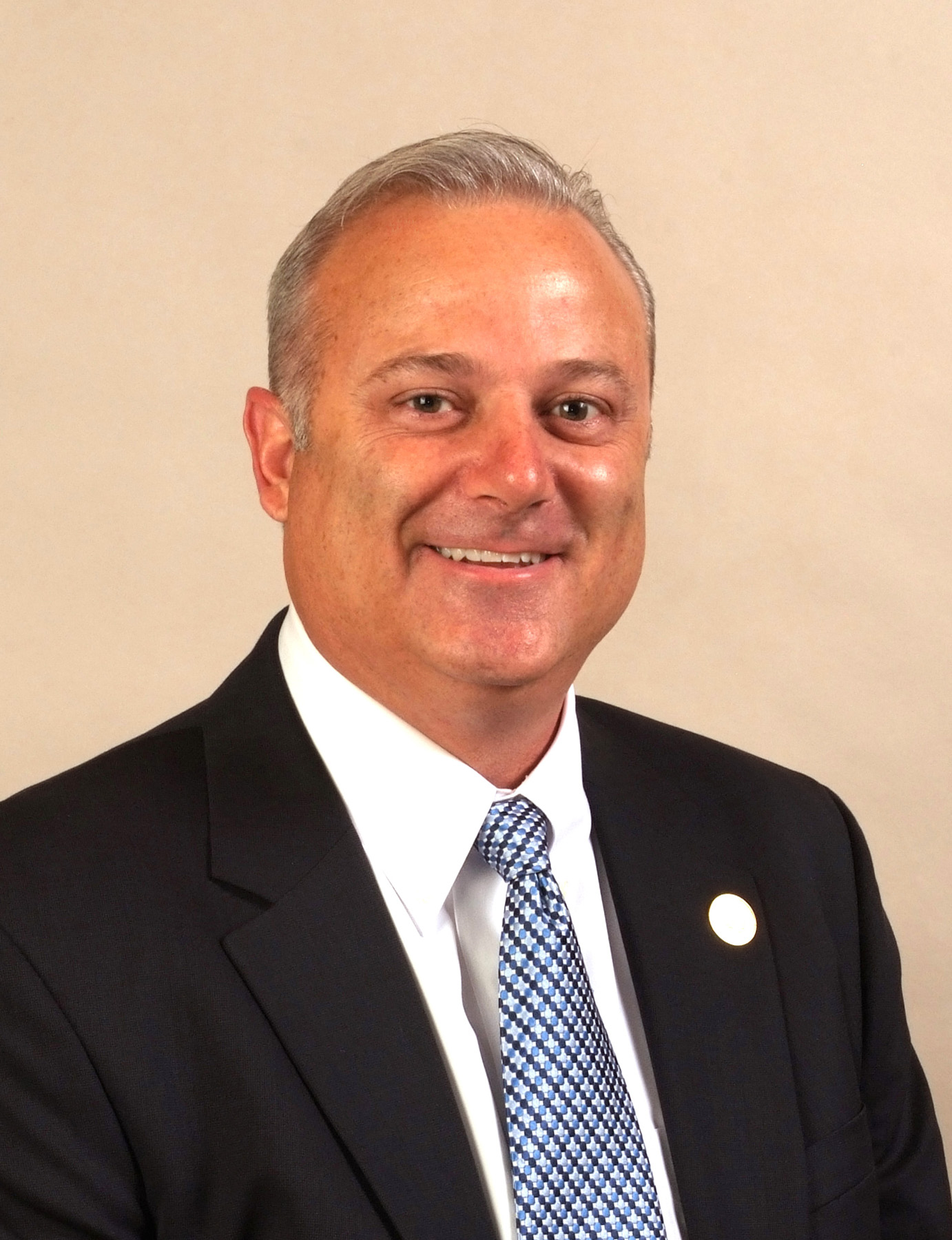
- Official portrait, 2014

President of Northwest Florida State College
- Incumbent
- Assumed office January 2, 2025
- Preceded by: Devin Stephenson

Member of the Florida House of Representatives from the 4th district
- In office November 8, 2016 – November 3, 2020
- Preceded by: Matt Gaetz
- Succeeded by: Patt Maney

Mayor of Destin, Florida
- In office 2014–2016
- Preceded by: Sam Seevers
- Succeeded by: Scott Fischer

Personal details
- Born: May 28, 1968 (age 58)
- Party: Republican
- Education: Florida State University

Mel Ponder (born May 28, 1968) is the president of Northwest Florida State College. He began serving in that position in January 2025. Affiliated with the Republican Party, Ponder previously served as a member of the Florida House of Representatives, representing the 4th district between 2016 and 2020.

Ponder also served as the mayor of Destin, Florida, from 2014 to 2016. On August 30, 2016, Ponder won a close and contentious five-way primary to become the Republican nominee to represent District 4 in the Florida House of Representatives. Ponder was elected unopposed in the November general election. He succeeded state representative Matt Gaetz, who was elected to the Florida 1st District U.S. House seat.
