= Brad Drake =

Republican politician

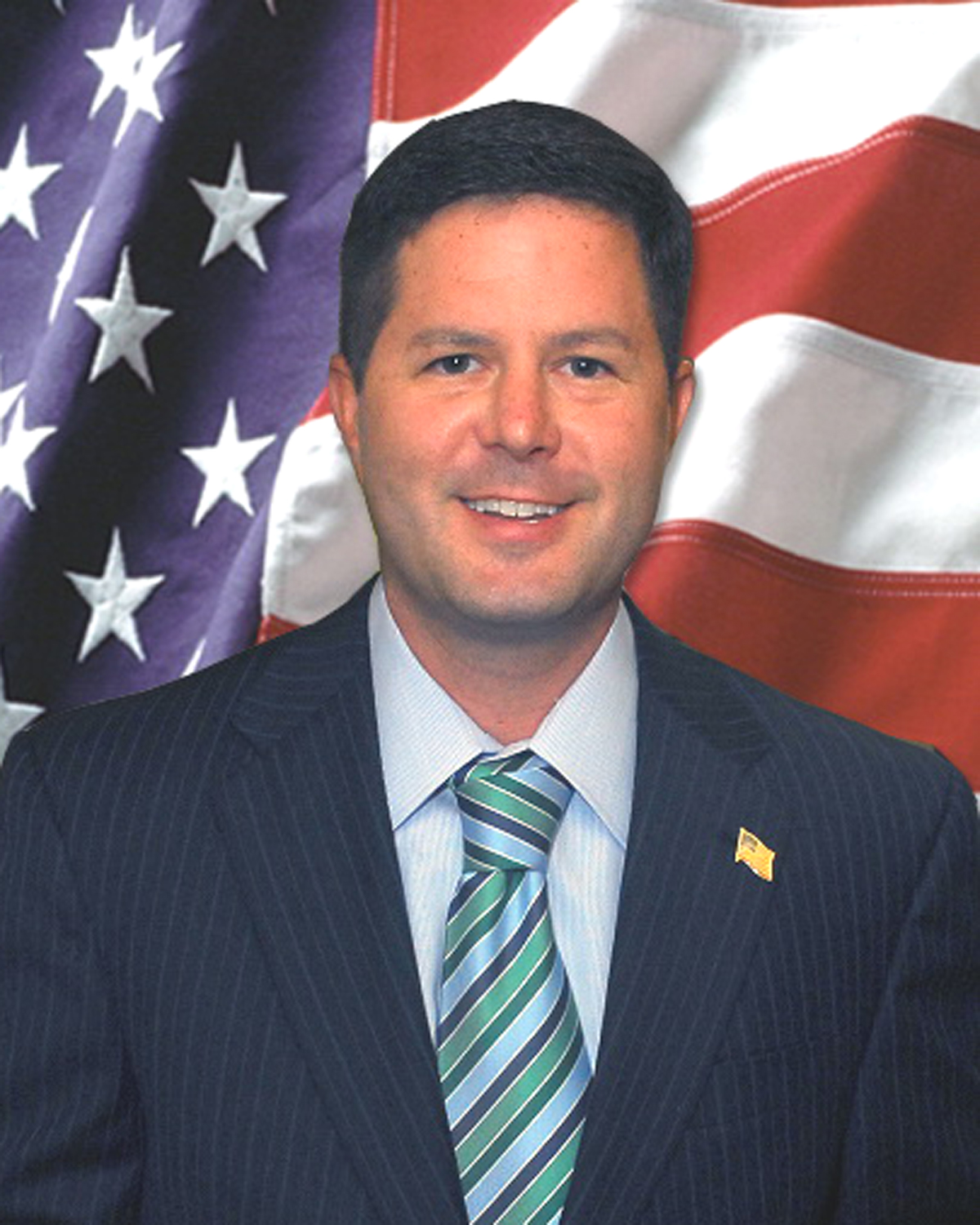

Member of the Florida House of Representatives from the 5th district
- In office November 4, 2014 – November 8, 2022
- Preceded by: Marti Coley
- Succeeded by: Shane Abbott
- In office November 4, 2008 – November 6, 2012
- Preceded by: Don Brown
- Succeeded by: Marti Coley

Personal details
- Born: February 7, 1975 (age 51) Fort Walton Beach, Florida
- Party: Republican
- Education: University of Florida (B.S.)
- Profession: Marketing executive

Brad Drake (born February 7, 1975) is a Republican politician who is currently serving as Walton County Commissioner, District 3. He was appointed by Governor Ron DeSantis on September 7, 2023.

He previously served as a member of the Florida House of Representatives, representing the 5th district, which included Holmes County, Jackson County, Walton County, Washington County, and northern Bay County. He served from 2008 to 2012 and 2014 to 2022.

== History ==
Drake was born in Fort Walton Beach into a political family, which included his grandfather, J. Troy Peacock, who served as a State Representative; his father, David Earl Drake, who served as Superintendent of Walton County Public Schools; and his cousin, Pat Thomas, who served as the President of the Florida Senate. He attended the University of Florida, graduating with a degree in economics, and after graduation, worked for State Representative Don Brown as a legislative aide.

== Florida House of Representatives ==
In 2008, following the inability of Brown to seek re-election due to term limits, Drake ran to succeed him in the 5th district, which was based in Holmes County, northern Jackson County, Okaloosa County, Walton County, and Washington County. He faced Okaloosa County Commissioner Sherry Campbell in the Republican primary, whom he was able to handily defeat, winning 70% of the vote to Campbell's 30%. Advancing to the general election, Drake faced John McDaniel, the Democratic nominee and the Sheriff of Jackson County for nearly thirty years. Despite the district's strong conservative lean, McDaniel was heralded by the Florida Democratic Party as a top-tier candidate in the area. However, the district stayed true to its lean, and Drake won his first term in the legislature in a landslide, receiving 60% of the vote to McDaniel's 40%. Running for re-election in 2010, Drake faced neither opposition in the primary election nor in the general election, and won his second term entirely uncontested. During his second term in the legislature, Drake introduced legislation that would reform capital punishment in the state by replacing lethal injection with the electric chair or firing squad. He argued, "We still have Old Sparky. And if that doesn't suit the criminal, then we will provide them with a .45 caliber lead cocktail instead." He also observed that, in his view, whether the execution is considered to be "humane" should not be considered, noting, "I am sick and tired of this sensitivity movement for criminals. Every time there is a warranted execution that is about to take place, some man or woman is standing on a corner holding a sign, yelling and screaming for humane treatment. I am so tired of being humane to inhumane people."

When the state's legislative districts were redrawn in 2012, Drake was moved into the same district as fellow State Representative Marti Coley, who was running for her final term in the legislature. Rather than challenge Coley in the primary, Drake opted to not seek re-election, and decided to run to succeed Coley in the revamped 5th district, which includes northern Bay County, Jackson County, Holmes County, Walton County, and Washington County, in 2014. He faced realtor Jan Hooks in the Republican primary, whom he defeated handily, winning about 73% of the vote. In the general election, Drake faced Karen Schoen, the Libertarian nominee, and won election to the legislature once again with 76% of the vote.
