= James Ward (Florida politician) =

American politician

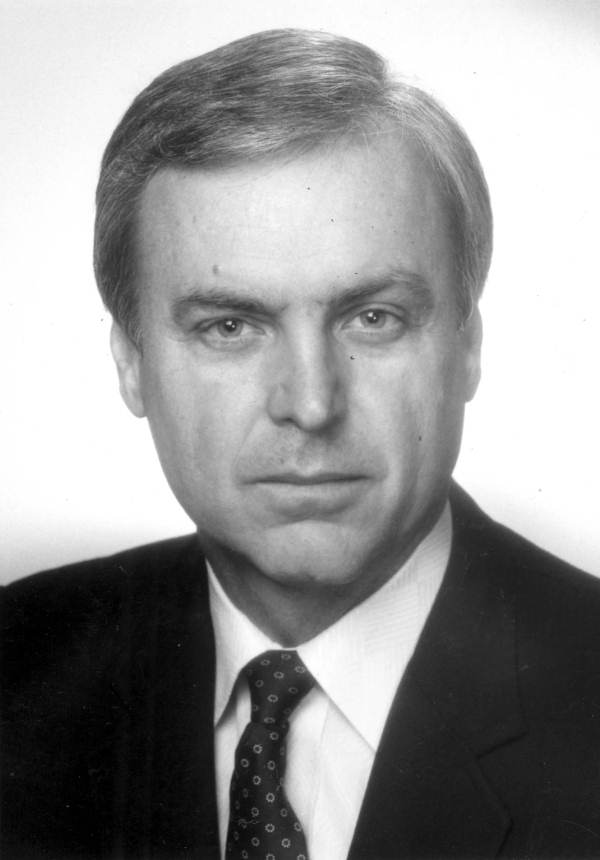

Member of the Florida House of Representatives from the 5th district
- In office November 2, 1982 – November 4, 1986
- Preceded by: Ken Boles
- Succeeded by: Robert Harden

Member of the Florida House of Representatives from the 6th district
- In office November 2, 1976 – November 2, 1982
- Preceded by: Jere Tolton
- Succeeded by: Ron Johnson

Personal details
- Born: December 7, 1942 (age 83) Pensacola, Florida, U.S.
- Party: Democratic
- Education: Florida State University
- Occupation: businessman

James G. Ward (born December 7, 1942) is an American former politician in the state of Florida.

Ward was born Pensacola, Florida and is a businessman. He served in the Florida House of Representatives for the 6th district from November 2, 1976, to November 2, 1982, and the 5th district from November 2, 1982, to November 4, 1986, as a Democrat.
