= Philip Griffitts =

American politician

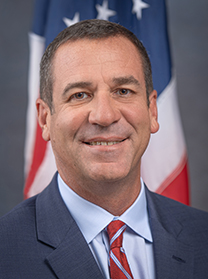

Member of the Florida House of Representatives from the 6th district
- Incumbent
- Assumed office November 8, 2022
- Preceded by: Jay Trumbull

Personal details
- Born: 1971 (age 54–55)
- Party: Republican
- Spouse: Laura Griffitts
- Children: 2 Katherine Griffitts Anna Claire Griffitts
- Education: Florida State University

Philip Griffitts (born 1971) is an American politician. He serves as a Republican member for the 6th district of the Florida House of Representatives.

== Life and career ==
Griffitts is the son of Philip Griffitts Sr., a former mayor of Panama City Beach, Florida. He attended Florida State University. After college, Griffitts went on to run his family owned businesses. In 2016, he ran for county commissioner. He served as County Commissioner from 2016-2022.

In August 2022, Griffitts defeated Brian Clowdus in the Republican primary election for the 6th district of the Florida House of Representatives. He was elected to represent the 6th district on November 8, 2022, succeeding Jay Trumbull.
