= Durell Peaden =

American politician

Durell Peaden Jr.
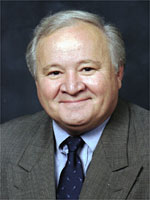

Member of the Florida Senate from the 2nd district
- In office November 5, 2002 – November 2, 2010
- Preceded by: Betty Holzendorf
- Succeeded by: Greg Evers

Member of the Florida Senate from the 1st district
- In office November 7, 2000 – November 5, 2002
- Preceded by: W. D. Childers
- Succeeded by: Anthony C. "Tony" Hill

Member of the Florida House of Representatives from the 5th district
- In office November 8, 1994 – November 7, 2000
- Preceded by: Sam Mitchell
- Succeeded by: Don Brown

Personal details
- Born: August 24, 1945 DeFuniak Springs, Florida
- Died: June 23, 2015 (aged 69) Pittsburgh, Pennsylvania
- Party: Republican (1997 - Present); Democratic (before 1997)
- Spouse: Nancy Green
- Children: 3
- Education: Tulane University, Universidad Autónoma de Guadalajara, Thomas Goode Jones School of Law
- Profession: Physician (retired), lawyer, politician

Durell Peaden Jr. (August 24, 1945 – June 23, 2015) was a Republican member of the Florida Senate, representing the 2nd District since November 5, 2002. He left office at the end of November 2, 2010 due to term limits.

Previously he was a member of the Florida House of Representatives's 5th district from November 8, 1994, through November 7, 2000. He switched from the Democratic party to the Republican party in June 1997.

Peaden received his bachelor's degree in chemistry from Tulane University (1968), his medical degree from the Universidad Autónoma de Guadalajara in Jalisco, Mexico (1973), and his law degree from the Thomas Goode Jones School of Law at Faulkner University (1987). His medical residency was at the University of Florida, and he practiced medicine from 1975 until his retirement in 1999. He and his first wife, Sharon Peaden, had three sons. He was married to Nancy Green until his death.

Peaden was a sponsor of the 2005 Florida stand-your-ground law, which was subject to scrutiny in the 2012 killing of Trayvon Martin. He sponsored the bill that created a medical school at Florida State University. Peaden died after a heart attack suffered earlier in the month on June 23, 2015, in Pittsburgh, Pennsylvania.
