= Ray Sansom =

American politician

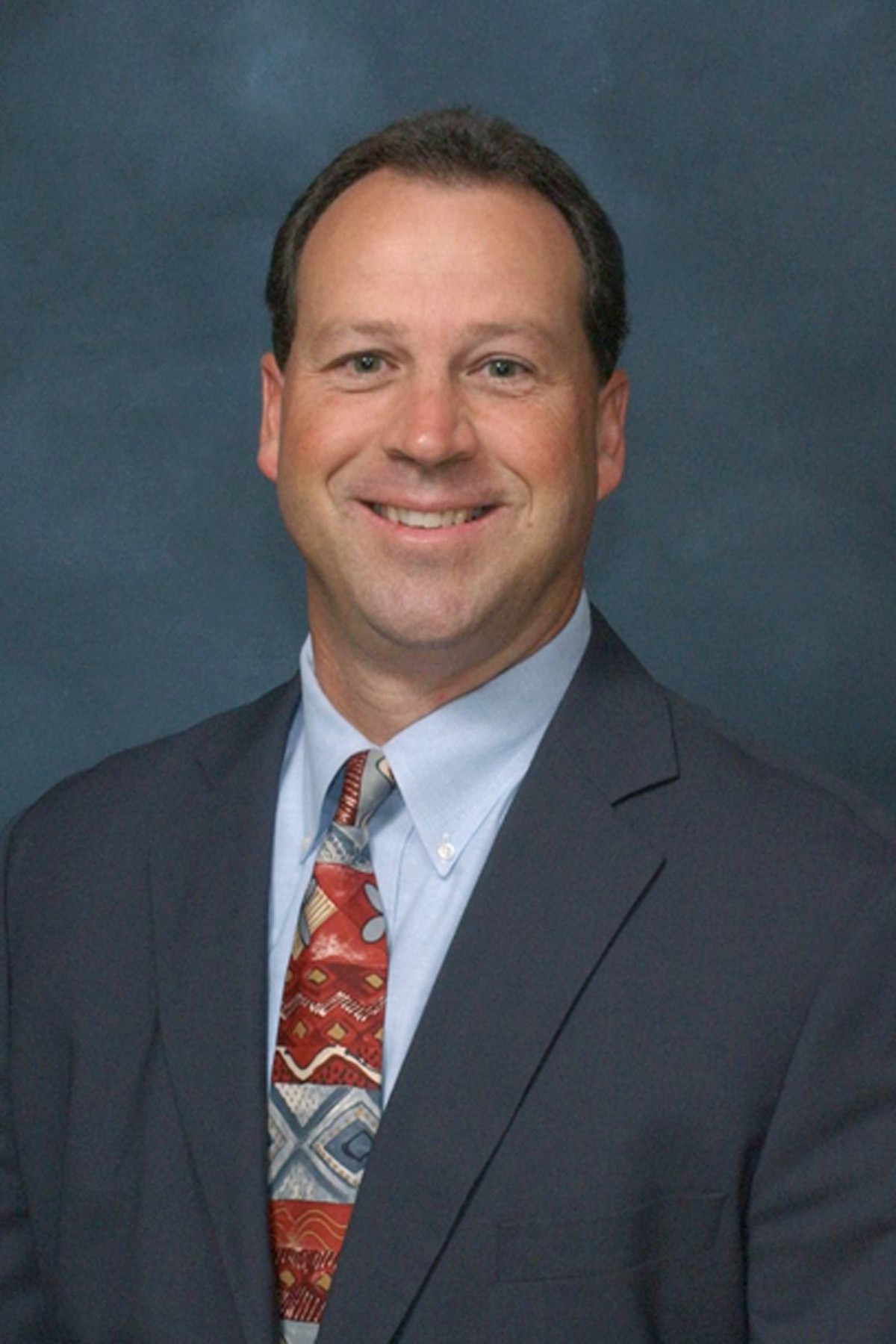

95th Speaker of the Florida House of Representatives
- In office November 18, 2008 – March 2, 2009
- Preceded by: Marco Rubio
- Succeeded by: Larry Cretul

Member of the Florida House of Representatives from the 4th district
- In office November 5, 2002 – February 21, 2010
- Preceded by: Jerry Melvin
- Succeeded by: Matt Gaetz

Personal details
- Born: July 11, 1962 (age 64) Fort Walton Beach, Florida, U.S.
- Party: Republican
- Spouse: Tricia Raimey
- Education: Okaloosa-Walton Junior College (A.A.); Florida State University (B.A.); University of West Florida (M.A.)

Ray Sansom (born July 11, 1962) is an American politician who was a Republican member of the Florida House of Representatives, representing portions of Okaloosa and Santa Rosa counties from 2002 to February 21, 2010.

Sansom is married to Tricia Raimey Sansom and they have three children. Sansom lists his religious affiliation as Baptist and actively attended Wright Baptist Church in Fort Walton Beach, Florida for many years.

Sansom received his bachelor's degree in political science from the Florida State University in 1984 and his master's degree in education from the University of West Florida in 1993. Prior to his election to the Florida House of Representatives, he served on the Okaloosa County Board of Commissioners from 1992 to 2000. He received the Okaloosa County Management Association's Presidents Award in 1999 and the Association of Counties, Freshman of the Year award in 2003.

Sansom was elected Speaker of the Florida House on November 18, 2008. He temporarily stepped down on January 30, 2009, following a scandal over accepting an unadvertised job. He was formally charged with third-degree felony grand theft and conspiracy.

On February 2, Sansom resigned the speakership before the House considered an action that could have removed him as speaker and expelled him from the legislature. His resignation was on the eve of his criminal trial for misappropriation of state tax dollars. If Sansom had been removed by the vote by the House members, he would have been the first lawmaker expelled from the Chamber in nearly 50 years.

Eventually, the state failed to prove their charges, and all counts were dropped.

== Early political career ==
Prior to his election to the Florida House of Representatives, Sansom served on the Okaloosa County Board of County Commissioners from 1992 to 2000. He received the Okaloosa County Management Association's Presidents Award in 1999.

In 2008, Sansom was one of the driving forces pushing to create an "oversight board for community colleges that emphasizes undergraduate education". This proposal received resistance from some community college presidents who were not for the change and also from private colleges who offered 4-year degrees on these community college campuses.

Also in 2008, Sansom was appointed Vice President for Development and Planning at NWF State College - his former alma mater from his hometown. The college's Board of Trustees appointed Sansom to this position. This was the same week Sansom was sworn in as the Florida Speaker of the House.

In response to his appointment, Sansom said, "The work that I will be doing at Northwest Florida State College is something I've been preparing for throughout my career. I'm honored and excited to be associated with an institution that's at the forefront of educating the workforce that will sustain the economy of northwest Florida well into the future. Beyond that, it means a lot to me to return to an institution that my wife and I both attended as students and that enabled me to get a college education. Throughout my time in the Legislature, I have tried to help the college grow and prosper, precisely because its success is so important to the future of our region."

One of his duties, as outlined by College President Bob Richburg, would be to assist with "...formalizing agreements with local governments for training emergency personnel and for the use of the college's Community Services Complex during times of natural disaster. The 120,000 square--foot facility, currently under construction on the college's Niceville campus, will house the Okaloosa County 911 Emergency Operations Center, college athletic and instructional programs, and serve as the county's primary hurricane shelter. Sansom's new role will include leading the conferencing and training efforts of the college, including statewide training opportunities related to the joint use facility."

However, it was this appointment and specifically, this area of his responsibility, that would subsequently raise questions and eventually create the controversy the resulted in Sansom's decision to resign.

== Scandal and resignation ==
In December 2008, an unnamed resident of Clearwater, Florida, filed a complaint against now Speaker of the House Sansom asserting that over a period of two years he had secured about $35 million in extra or accelerated funding for Northwest Florida State College in spite or other statewide budget cuts. The college then rewarded Sansom with a $110,000 a year job as vice president of development.

According to the Orlando Sentinel, part of that state funding was a $6 million appropriation for an "education facility" for Northwest Florida State College. However, several Florida newspapers alleged that the money actually went to pay his salary as a new vice president, and build an aircraft hangar on state land to house jet aircraft for a political campaign contributor.

On January 6, 2009, at the urging of Republican leaders, Sansom resigned from his post as vice president of development at Northwest Florida State College amidst statewide criticism.

On January 10, 2009, Rep. Sansom wrote an open letter, published in his district's newspaper, the Northwest Florida Daily News, to clarify his position.

On January 30, under growing pressure from his fellow Republicans, Sansom announced that under a little-known House rule, he would temporarily "recuse" himself from his authority as Speaker. Under that rule, Speaker Pro Tem Larry Cretul, Sansom's roommate while the House is in session, would serve as Speaker in Sansom's absence.

In April 2009, a grand jury indicted Speaker of the House Ray Samson, president of Northwest Florida State College Bob Richburg and businessman and political campaign contributor Jay Odom. They were charged with official misconduct, a third-degree felony which could result in a five-year prison sentence.

On February 21, Sansom resigned as Speaker of the House and his seat as a State Representative under threat of expulsion by the Republican House, on the eve of the beginning of his trial for misconduct. Charges were dismissed, appealed, and dismissed again, until all charges were dismissed.

Speaker Pro Temp Cretul was unanimously elected his successor, and was formally elected Speaker on March 3, the first day of the regular legislative session.

== Criminal case ==
A circuit judge dismissed most of the charges in October and an appellate court reaffirmed the judge's ruling on the last day of 2009.

After losing the appeal on the first round of charges, on January 6, 2010, the Leon County State Attorney Willie Meggs charged the trio with grand theft and conspiracy. Attorneys for Sansom and his co-defendants in the criminal trial - former college President Bob Richburg and developer Jay Odom - wanted Meggs removed from the case for "prosecutorial misconduct".

March 28, 2011, Prosecutors dropped all charges against former House Speaker Ray Sansom and Odem. The abrupt decision to abandon the case followed a statement by Circuit Judge Terry Lewis that he didn’t believe prosecutors had made any progress in their attempt to prove a conspiracy.
