= Shane Abbott =

American politician

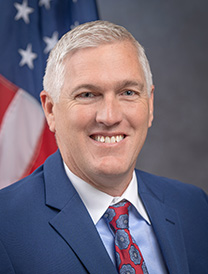

Member of the Florida House of Representatives from the 5th district
- Incumbent
- Assumed office November 8, 2022
- Preceded by: Brad Drake

Personal details
- Party: Republican
- Spouse: Holley Abbott (m. 1995)
- Education: Pensacola State College (AA); University of Florida (BS)

Shane Abbott is an American politician. He serves as a Republican member for the 5th district of the Florida House of Representatives.

== Life and career ==
Abbott was raised in DeFuniak Springs, Florida. He attended Pensacola Junior College and the University of Florida, where he earned a bachelor's degree in pharmacy. He co-owns The Prescription Place, which has two locations, as well as a Firestone Tire Service Center.

In January 2022, Abbott decided to collect signatures to qualify as a candidate for the 5th district of the Florida House of Representatives. On August 23, 2022, Abbott defeated Vance Coley and Clint Pate in the Republican primary election. No Democratic candidate was nominated to challenge him in the general election. He succeeded Brad Drake.
