= Ed Fortune =

American politician (born 1932)

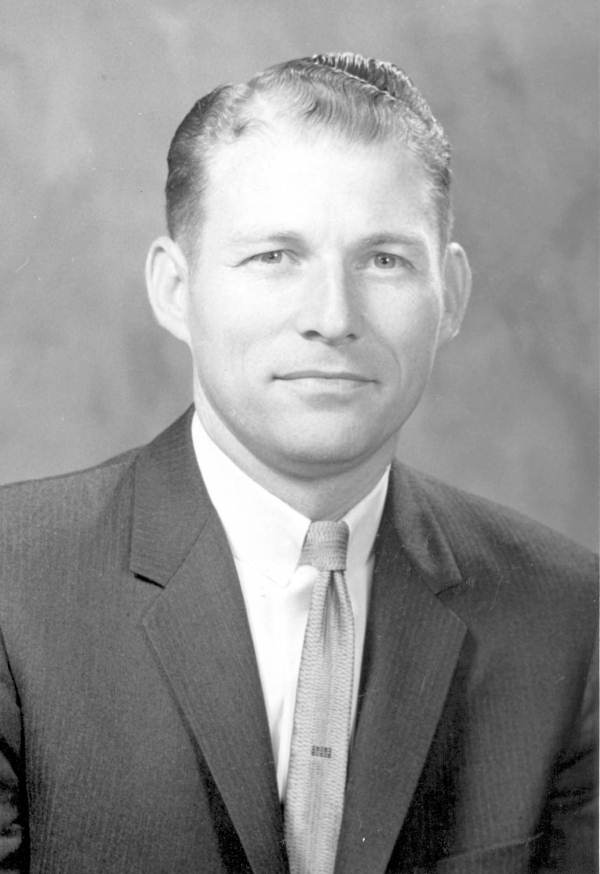

Member of the Florida House of Representatives from the 4th district
- In office November 7, 1972 – November 7, 1978
- Preceded by: James J. Reeves
- Succeeded by: Bolley Johnson

Member of the Florida House of Representatives from the 5th district
- In office 1967 – November 7, 1972
- Preceded by: district created
- Succeeded by: Jerry Melvin

Member of the Florida House of Representatives from the Okaloosa-Santa Rosa district
- In office 1966–1967

Personal details
- Born: Edmond Marmaduke Fortune; November 23, 1932 (age 93) Milton, Florida, United States
- Party: Democratic
- Occupation: Pharmacist

Edmond Marmaduke Fortune (born November 23, 1932) is an American politician who served in the Florida House of Representatives.

Fortune was born in Milton, Florida. He attended Howard College and is a pharmacist. He served in the Florida House of Representatives from 1966 to November 7, 1978, as a Democrat, representing the Okaloosa-Santa Rosa district, 4th, and 5th district at the conclusion of his service.
