= Florida's 6th House of Representatives district =

American legislative district

Florida's 6th State House of Representatives district
Representative
Philip Griffitts; R–Panama City
- Demographics: 81.4% White; 11.4% Black; 4.9% Hispanic; 2.1% Asian; 0.6% Native American; 0.1% Hawaiian/Pacific Islander; 1.2% Other
- Population (2010) • Voting age: 159,266; 124,614

Florida's 6th House district elects one member of the Florida House of Representatives. The district is represented by Philip Griffitts. This district is located in the Florida Panhandle, and encompasses part of the Emerald Coast. The district covers the southern half of Bay County. This district is anchored on Panama City, its largest city. As of the 2010 census, the district's population is 159,266.

This district contains Tyndall Air Force Base and Northwest Florida Beaches International Airport. The district also contains Gulf Coast State College and Florida State University Panama City, both located in Panama City.

Allen Bense served as the speaker of the Florida House of Representatives from 2004 until 2006.

== Representatives from 1967 to the present ==
Representatives by party affiliation
Party	Representatives
Democratic	5
Republican	4

#	Name	Term of service	Residence	Political party
1	Henton Elmore	1967–1972	Crestview	Democratic
2	Jere Tolton	1972–1976	Fort Walton Beach	Democratic
3	James Ward	1976–1982	Fort Walton Beach	Democratic
4	Ron Johnson	1982–1990	Panama City	Democratic
5	Scott Clemons	1990–1998	Panama City	Democratic
6	Allan Bense	1998–2006	Panama City	Republican
7	Jimmy Patronis	2006–2014	Panama City	Republican
8	Jay Trumbull	2014–2022	Panama City	Republican
9	Philip Griffitts	2022–present	Panama City	Republican

== See also ==
- Florida's 2nd Senate district
- Florida's 2nd congressional district
