= Sam Mitchell (Florida politician) =

American politician

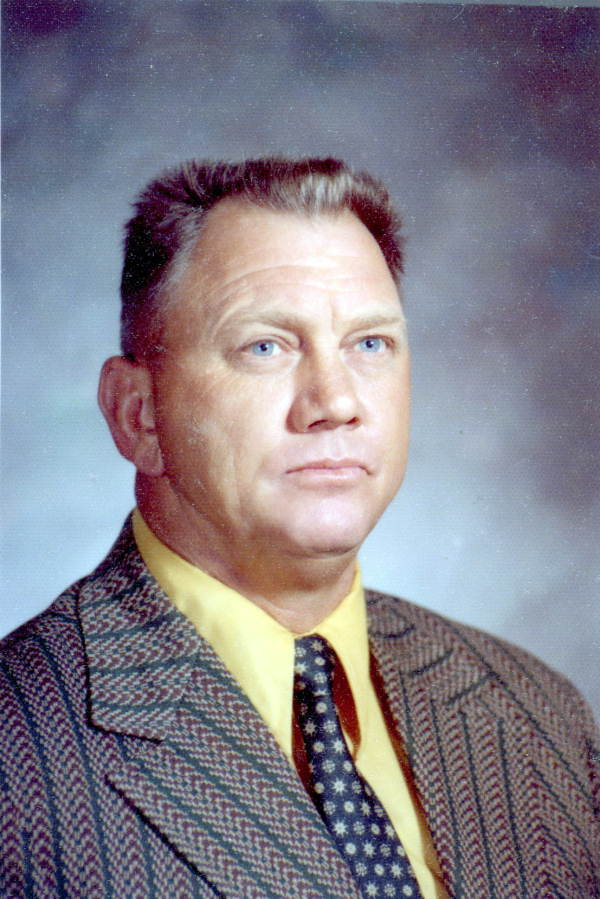
- Mitchell in 1978

Member of the Florida House of Representatives from Washington County
- In office 1956–1959

Member of the Florida House of Representatives from the 7th district
- In office 1978–1992
- Preceded by: Wayne Mixson
- Succeeded by: Robert Trammell

Member of the Florida House of Representatives from the 5th district
- In office 1992–1994
- Preceded by: Robert Harden
- Succeeded by: Durell Peaden

Personal details
- Born: August 2, 1929 Washington County, Florida, U.S.
- Died: November 15, 2003 (aged 74)
- Party: Democratic

Sam Mitchell (August 2, 1929 – November 15, 2003) was an American politician. He served as a Democratic member for the 5th and 7th district of the Florida House of Representatives.

== Life and career ==
Mitchell was born in Washington County, Florida.

In 1956, Mitchell was elected to the Florida House of Representatives, serving until 1959. In 1978, he was elected to represent the 7th district of the Florida House, succeeding Wayne Mixson. He served until 1992, when he was succeeded by Robert Trammell. In the same year, he was elected to represent the 5th district, succeeding Robert T. Harden. He served until 1994, when he was succeeded by Durell Peaden.

Mitchell died on November 15, 2003, at the age of 74.
