= Howard College =

Community college in Big Spring, Texas, US

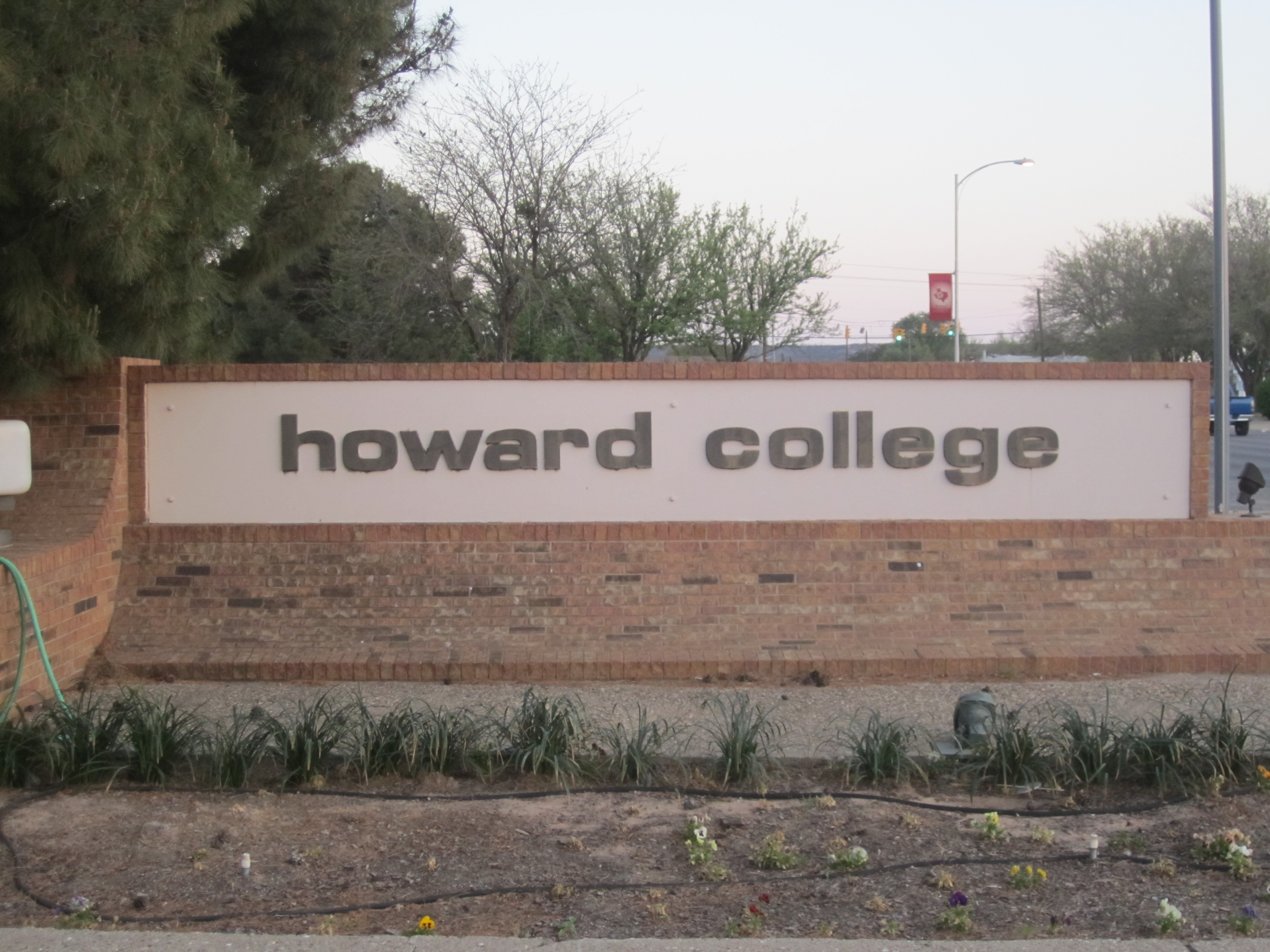
- Howard College entrance sign
- Type: Public community college
- Established: 1945
- Academic affiliations: SACS
- President: Cheryl Sparks
- Students: 4,623
- Location: Big Spring, Texas, U.S. 32.2506°N 101.4511°W
- Campus: Urban
- Nickname: Hawks
- Sporting affiliations: Western Junior College Athletic Conference (NJCAA)
- Website: www.howardcollege.edu

Howard College is a public community college with its main campus in Big Spring, Texas. It also has branch campuses in San Angelo and Lamesa.

== History ==
Howard County Junior College was established in Big Spring in 1945. 148 students began lessons in September 1946, in the hospital wing of the former Big Spring Army Air Force Bombardier School (later Webb Air Force Base). Five years later the school moved to a 100-acre (40 ha) site in southeast Big Spring which came to include an administration-classroom-library building, a practical-arts building, a greenhouse, a music building, dormitories, and a 10,000-seat stadium. The Lamesa campus was established in 1972 and the first class in San Angelo was held the following year. The school's name changed to Howard College by 1974. In August 1980 the school opened the Southwest Collegiate Institute for the Deaf on 57 acres (23 ha) of the former Webb Air Force Base, and it took over a nursing program in San Angelo the following year.

== Campus ==
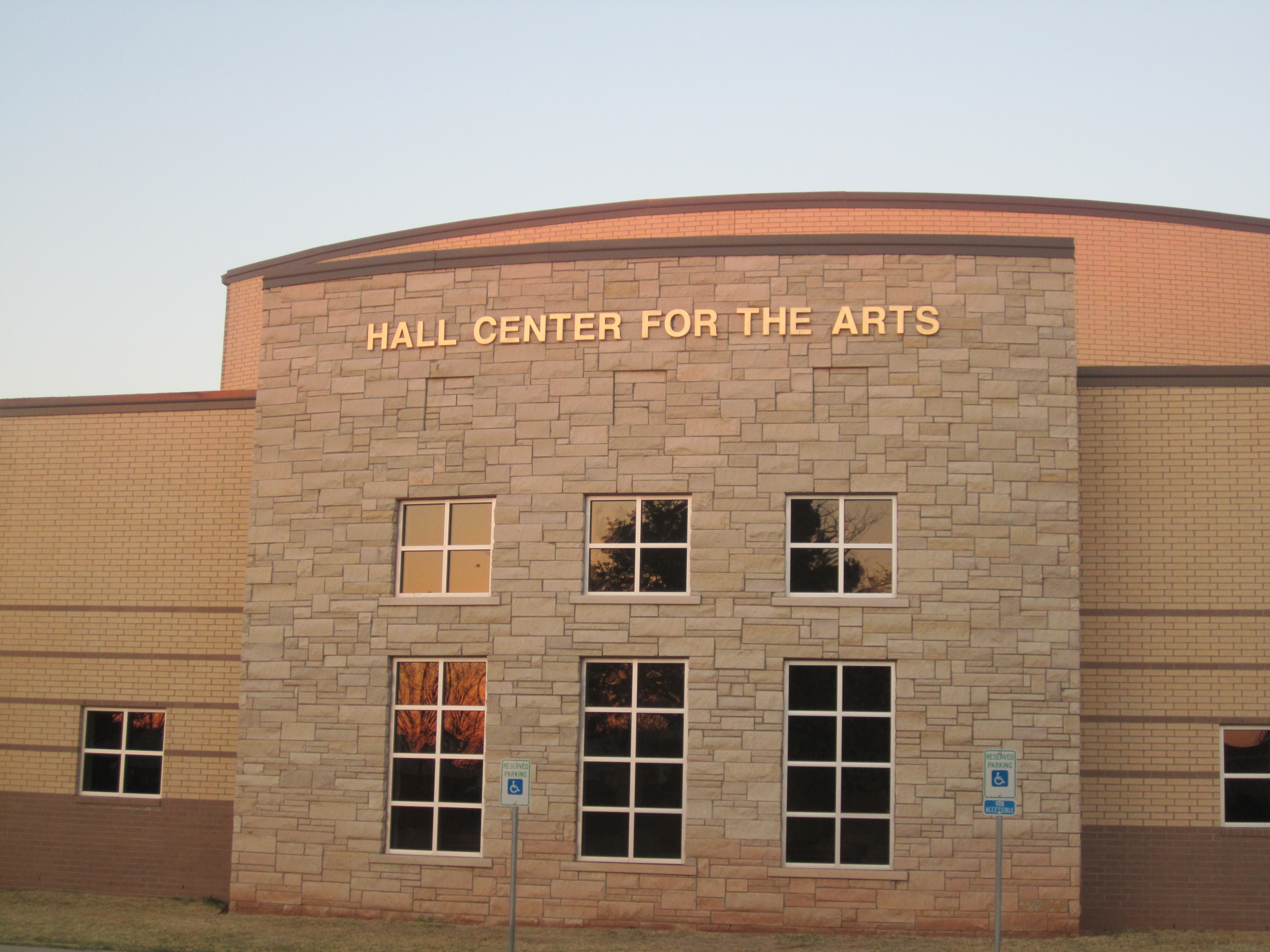
Hall Center for the Arts at Howard College

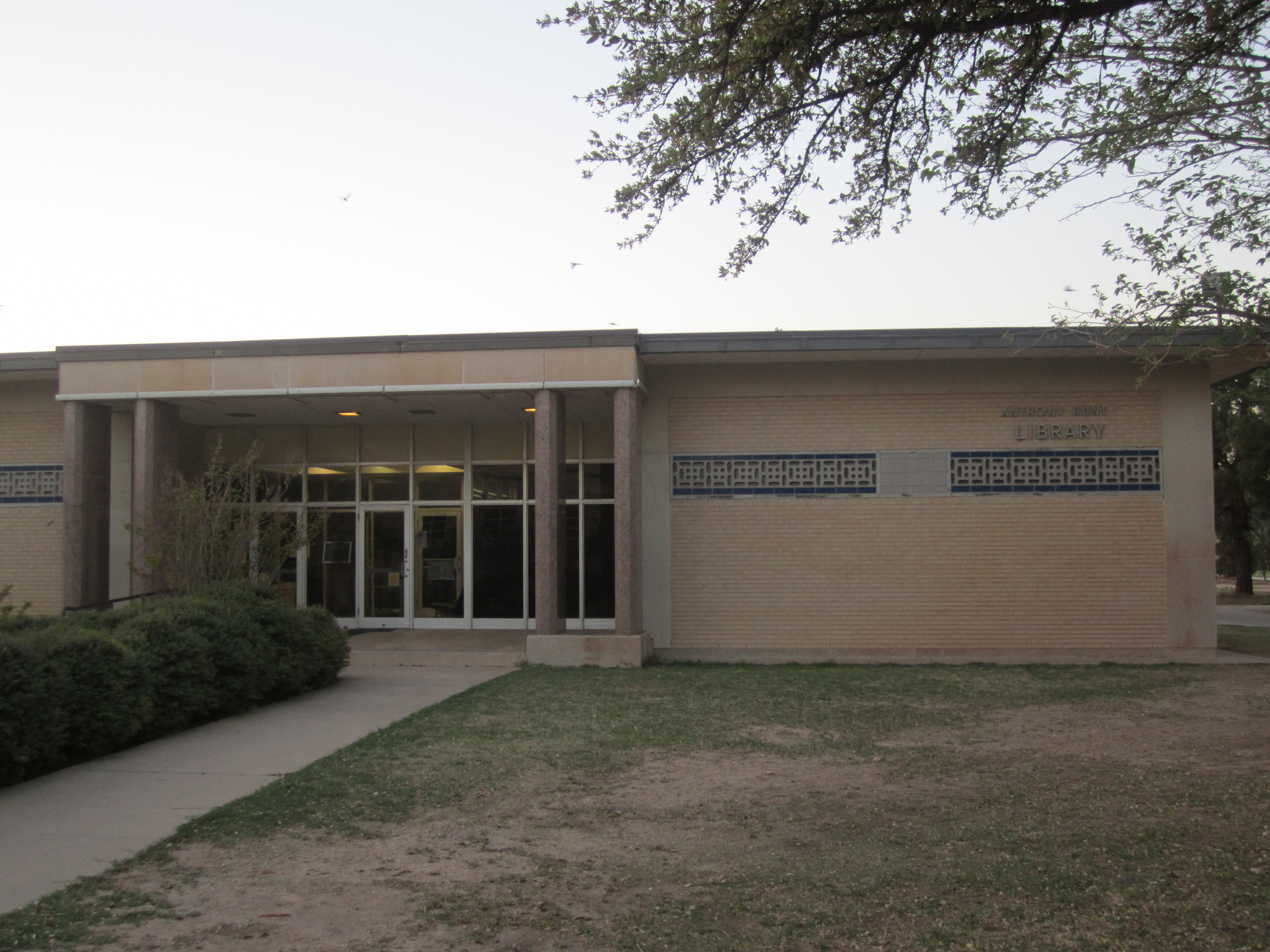
Anthony Hunt Library at Howard College

The main campus occupies 120 acres (49 ha) in Big Spring, with another 276 acres (112 ha) near Stanton in Martin County for agricultural research, and a 20-acre (8.1 ha) rodeo facility east of town. There are branch campuses in San Angelo, Lamesa, and at the SouthWest College for the Deaf in Big Spring; the college also offers programs at the Big Spring Federal Correctional Institute and the Eden Detention Center.

== Organization and administration ==
The president is Cheryl Sparks.

As defined by the Texas Legislature, the official service area of Howard College is Howard, Dawson, Martin, Glasscock, Sterling, Coke, Tom Green, Concho, Irion, Schleicher, Sutton, Menard, and Kimble counties.

== Academics ==
The college has 4,623 students of which 33 percent are full-time. It offers 41 majors in 17 programs and is accredited by The Commission on Colleges of the Southern Association of Colleges and Schools to award associate degrees.

== Athletics ==
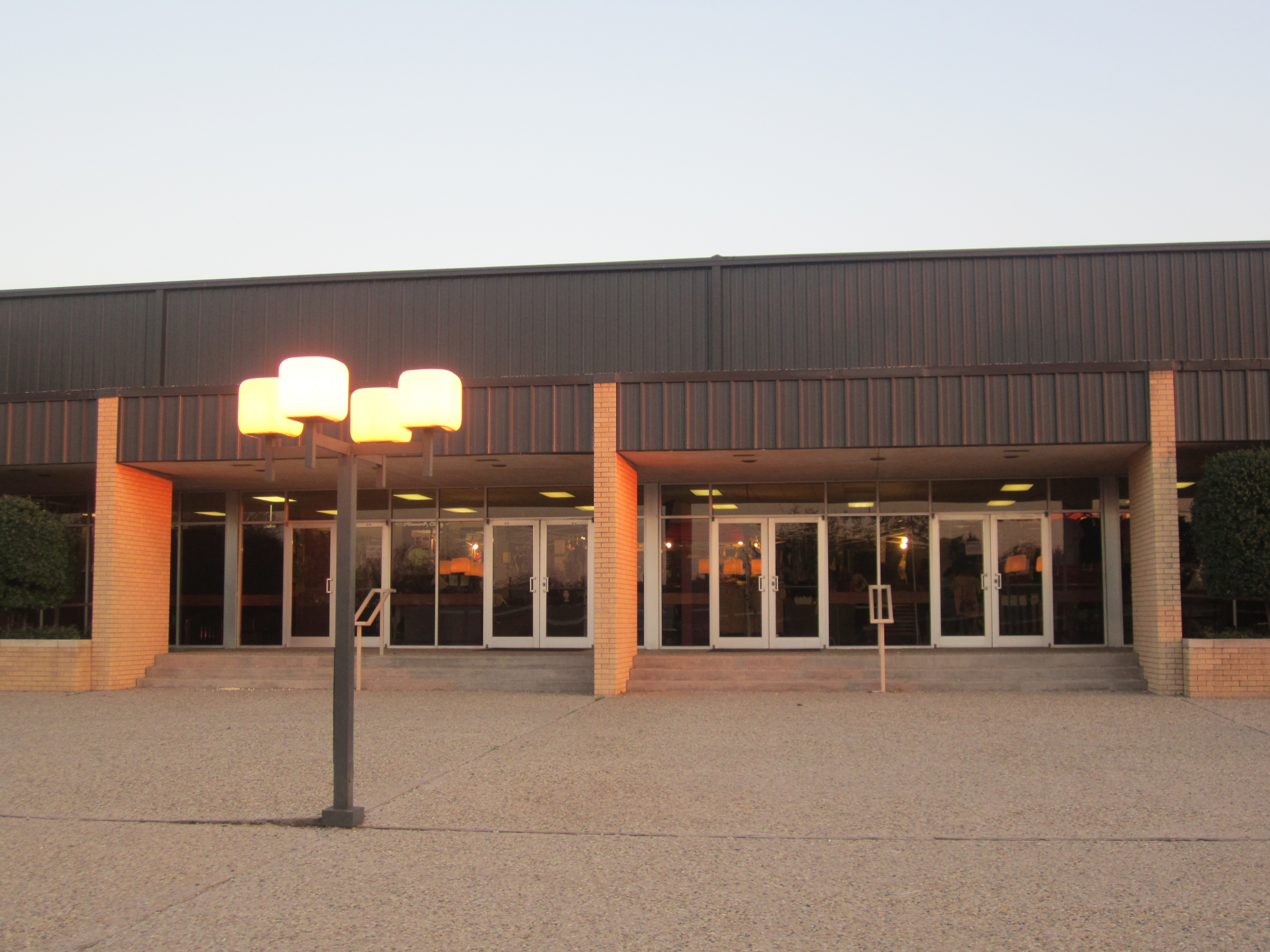
Howard College Athletic Center

The college sports teams are nicknamed the Hawks. Howard College participates in Region 5 of the NJCAA, also known as the Western Junior College Athletic Conference, in the following sports: baseball, softball, rodeo, men's and women's basketball, and cheerleading. The basketball and baseball games are broadcast locally on KBYG AM 1400. After winning in 1991, Howard won the Junior College (JUCO) World Series a second time, in 2009, with a season record of 63–1.

== Notable people ==
- Brandon Claussen, professional baseball player
- Tyler Collins, professional baseball player
- Joe Cooper, professional basketball player
- Jae Crowder, professional basketball player
- Jim Evans, professional football player
- Ed Fortune, politician
- Rob Gray, professional basketball player
- Tarik Phillip (born 1993), professional basketball player
- Tanner Scott, professional baseball player
- Burch Smith, professional baseball player
