= Henton Elmore =

American politician

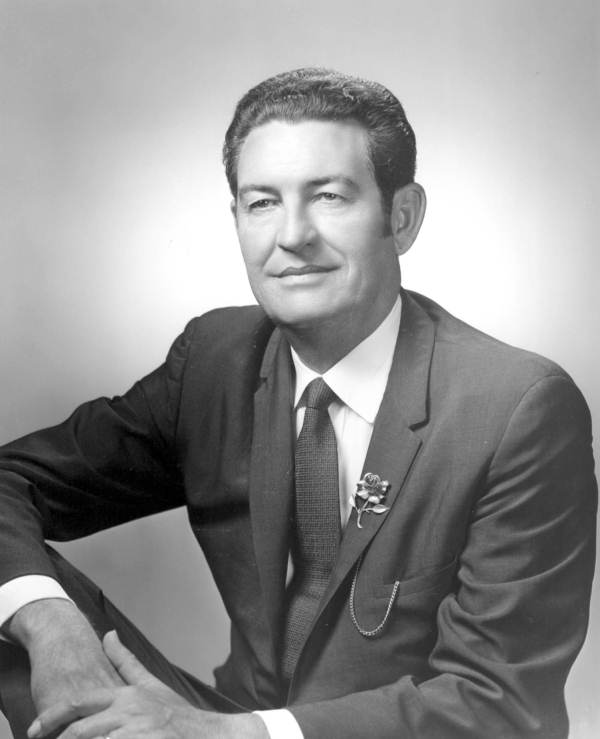
- Elmore in 1966

Member of the Florida House of Representatives from Okaloosa–Santa Rosa
- In office 1966–1967

Member of the Florida House of Representatives from the 6th district
- In office 1967–1972
- Preceded by: District established
- Succeeded by: Jere Tolton

Personal details
- Born: 1921 Houston County, Alabama, U.S.
- Died: January 13, 1991 (aged 69–70) Crestview, Florida, U.S.
- Party: Democratic
- Spouse: Dorothy G. Elmore
- Children: 4

Henton D. Elmore (1921 – January 13, 1991) was an American politician. He served as a Democratic member for the 6th district of the Florida House of Representatives.

== Life and career ==
Elmore was born in Houston County, Alabama. He served in the United States Marine Corps during World War II, and moved to Okaloosa County, Florida in 1953.

In 1966, Elmore was elected to the Florida House of Representatives as the first representative for the newly-established 6th district. He served until 1972, when he was succeeded by Jere Tolton.

Elmore died in January 1991 in Crestview, Florida, at the age of 69.
