= Tallahassee National Cemetery =

Veterans cemetery in Leon County, Florida

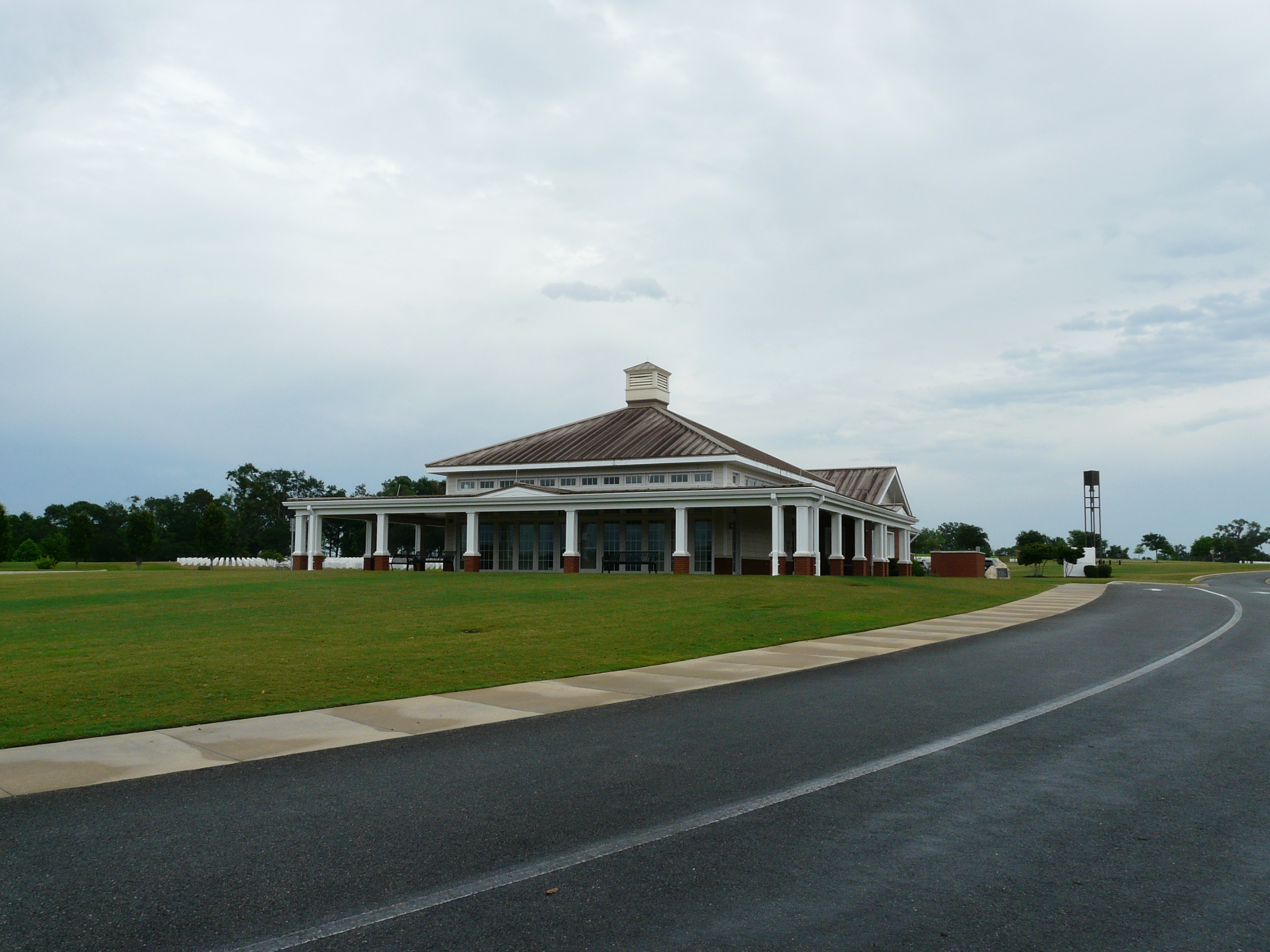
- Cemetery office

Details
- Established: 2015
- Location: Tallahassee, Florida
- Country: United States
- Coordinates: 30°25′15″N 84°11′14″W
- Type: United States National Cemetery
- Owned by: U.S. Department of Veterans Affairs
- Size: 250 acres (100 ha)
- No. of graves: 2,000
- Website: Official
- Find a Grave: Tallahassee National Cemetery

Tallahassee National Cemetery is a 250-acre (100 ha) National Cemetery located in Tallahassee in Leon County, Florida. It is administered by the United States Department of Veterans Affairs.

== History ==
The Veterans Administration purchased the 250-acre parcel of land in August 2012 for $6.8 million. On May 22, 2015, Tallahassee National Cemetery was dedicated. The cemetery is designed to accommodate the burials of over 83,000 veterans from Leon County and the surrounding area.

== Wreaths ==
Wreaths Across America (WAA) is a nonprofit organization that distributes wreaths for placement on veterans' graves in military cemeteries. The United States Senate issued a December 2008 resolution that designated December 13, 2008, as Wreaths Across America Day. Subsequent WAA days have been designated on the 2nd or 3rd Saturday in December. The wreaths are retired (removed) in early January.

== Notable interments ==
- Ken Boles - (1933–2022) Former member of the Florida House of Representatives from the 5th district.
