= Patt Maney =

American politician

T. Patt Maney
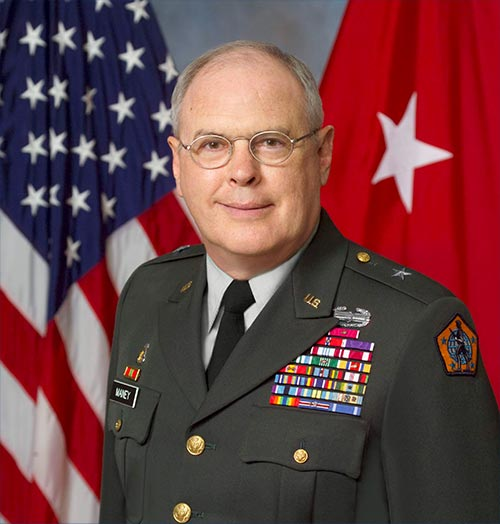

Member of the Florida House of Representatives from the 4th district
- Incumbent
- Assumed office November 3, 2020
- Preceded by: Mel Ponder

Judge of the Okaloosa County Court
- In office 1989–2018

Personal details
- Born: Thomas P. Maney; May 1948 (age 78) Lexington, Kentucky, U.S.
- Party: Republican
- Spouse: Caroline Maney
- Children: 2
- Education: University of Kentucky (BA); University of Louisville (JD); Troy University (MS)
- Occupation: Attorney, Judge, Politician
- Awards: Legion of Merit (2); Bronze Star Medal (2); Purple Heart; Secretary of Defense Award for Outstanding Public Service; Ghazi Mir Batcha Khan Medal (Afghanistan)
- Nickname: Patt

Military service
- Allegiance: United States
- Branch/service: United States Army
- Years of service: 1970–2007
- Rank: Brigadier General
- Unit: USACAPOC
- Commands: 350th Civil Affairs Command; 354th Civil Affairs Brigade
- Battles/wars: Operation Just Cause; Operation Uphold Democracy; Operation Joint Endeavor; Operation Enduring Freedom

Thomas Patterson Maney (born May 1948) is an American politician and former judge who served in the United States Army, retiring in 2007 with the rank of brigadier general. Maney was appointed to a county judgeship in Florida in 1989, and retired from the position in 2018. He has served as a member of the Florida House of Representatives since 2020.

== Early life, education and military career ==
Patt Maney was one of seven children born to parents Charles Thomas Maney and Mary Bewlay Steele Maney. Born in Lexington, Kentucky, Maney attended the University of Kentucky in his hometown where he was a member of the Reserve Officers' Training Corps program. Maney completed his undergraduate education in 1970, and pursued legal studies at the University of Louisville School of Law. He formally joined the United States Army in 1970, and obtained his degree in law in 1974. While serving in the military, Maney also studied at the Army War College, graduating in 1989. He served during Operation Just Cause in Panama, Operation Uphold Democracy in Haiti, as well as Operations Joint Guard and Joint Endeavor in Bosnia. Maney was injured by an improvised explosive device in August 2005, while in Afghanistan as a part of Operation Enduring Freedom. The explosion tore cartilage in both shoulders, sprained his knees, broke his nose, cracked 27 of his teeth, and caused a traumatic brain injury. He spent twenty months in recovery at the Walter Reed Army Medical Center, and subsequently ended his military career in April 2007, having served nearly 37 years in the army and advancing to the rank of brigadier general. The University of Kentucky awarded Maney an honorary doctorate in law in 2016.

== Judicial and political career ==
Maney began his legal career in Louisville, Kentucky, then moved to Okaloosa County, Florida in 1975, and continued the practice of law in Fort Walton Beach. Maney practiced law for fifteen years prior to his appointment as a county judge in Florida's First Judicial Circuit for Okaloosa County in 1989. In May 2007, Maney tentatively resumed his judgeship, having recovered from wounds related to his tour of duty in Afghanistan. On January 31, 2016, Maney became the longest-serving county or circuit judge to preside within the First Judicial Circuit. He retired from the bench in May 2018, the same month he turned seventy, Florida's mandatory retirement age for judges.

Eventually, Maney settled in Shalimar. By September 2019, Maney had already expressed interest in contesting an open seat in the state legislature. Maney pre-qualified his candidacy for the 2020 Florida House of Representatives election with the Florida Division of Elections in October 2019. Maney finished first in a field of four candidates during a Republican Party primary, held on August 18, 2020, to nominate a candidate for Florida's 4th House of Representatives district, a seat left open by Mel Ponder. He defeated Democratic Party candidate John Plante and write-in candidate Lance Lawrence in the general election. Maney was sworn in as a member of the Florida House of Representatives on November 17, 2020.
