= Bolley Johnson =

American politician

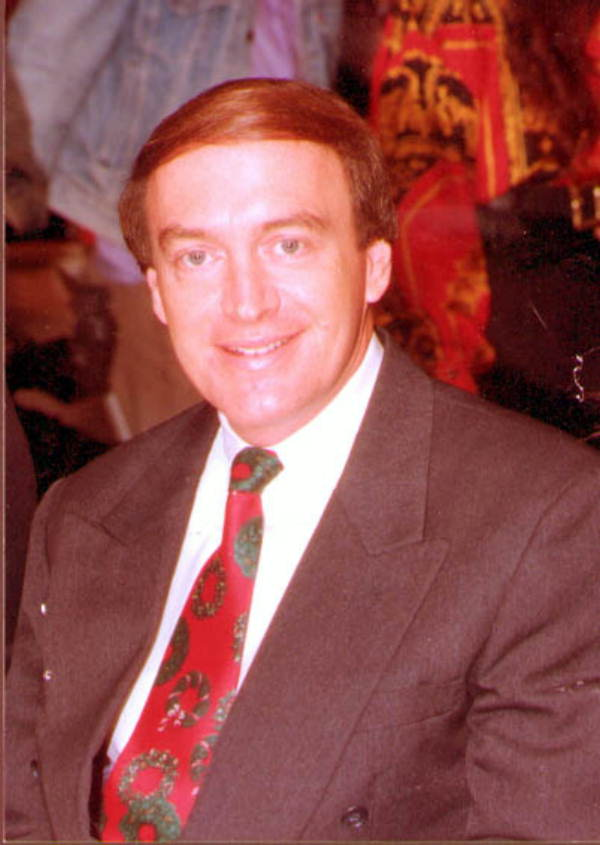

87th Speaker of the Florida House of Representatives
- In office November 17, 1992 – November 22, 1994
- Preceded by: T. K. Wetherell
- Succeeded by: Peter R. Wallace

Member of the Florida House of Representatives from the 1st district
- In office November 3, 1992 – November 8, 1994
- Preceded by: Tom Tobiassen
- Succeeded by: Jerry Burroughs

Member of the Florida House of Representatives from the 4th district
- In office November 7, 1978 – November 3, 1992
- Preceded by: Ed Fortune
- Succeeded by: James P. Kerrigan

Personal details
- Born: November 15, 1951 (age 74) Milton, Florida
- Party: Democratic Republican
- Spouse: Judi
- Education: Florida State University

Bolley L. "Bo" Johnson (born November 15, 1951) is an American businessman and former politician in the state of Florida. A member of the Democratic Party, Johnson was a member of the Florida House of Representatives, and served as the Speaker of the Florida House of Representatives.

== Early life ==
Johnson is from Milton, Florida. His father and grandfather served as county commissioners for Santa Rosa County, Florida. Johnson graduated from Milton High School, and became the first member of his family to attend college. He received his bachelor's degree from Florida State University.

== Career ==
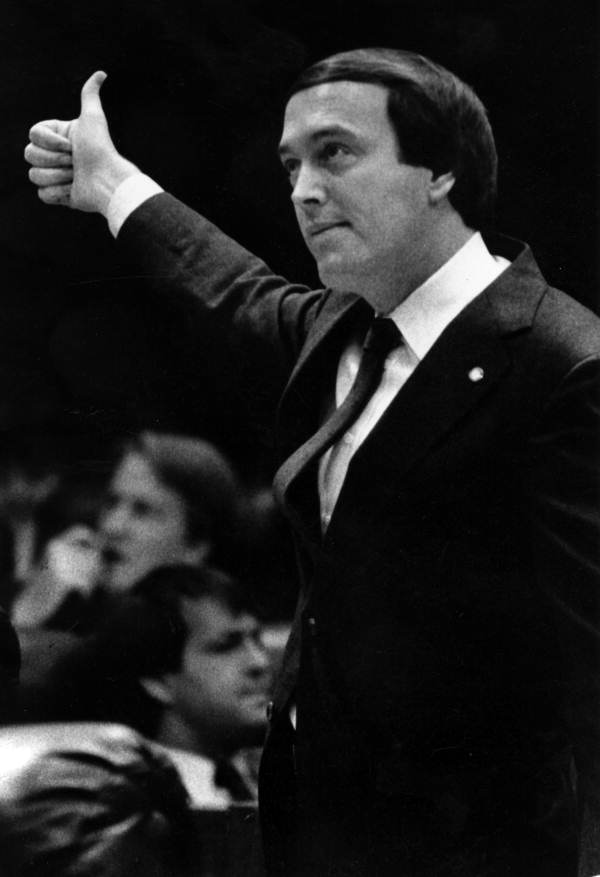
Bo Johnson (photographed by Donn Dughi (Donald Gregory)

Johnson volunteered for Mallory Horne when Horne served as the president of the Florida Senate. At the age of 22, Johnson met Lawton Chiles, then a member of the United States Senate, who hired him as a legislative aide in 1973.

Johnson was elected to the Florida House of Representatives, representing the 4th district from November 7, 1978, to November 3, 1992. He also served the 1st district from November 3, 1992, to November 8, 1994. He became the Speaker of the Florida House of Representatives in 1992.

He supported term limits.

=== Arrest and conviction ===
In 1999, Johnson and his wife were convicted of tax evasion, for failing to report income earned from consulting with Bally Entertainment. He was sentenced to two years in prison, while Judi was sentenced to 15 months. They began serving their sentences on August 30.

=== After ===
He decided not to run for re-election to the Florida House in 1994. He opted not to run for the United States House of Representatives. After leaving politics, Johnson moved to Pensacola, Florida, where he worked as a real estate broker.

== Personal ==
In 1999 Bolley "Bo" Johnson was convicted of tax evasion along with his wife Judi. According to court documents they failed report $452,675 in consulting fee income. Both of them served 15 months in federal prison.

Johnson and his wife, Judi, have a daughter. A niece also lived with them as a child. Johnson is a Methodist.
