= Florida's 7th Senate district =

Florida Senate district

Florida's 7th State Senate district
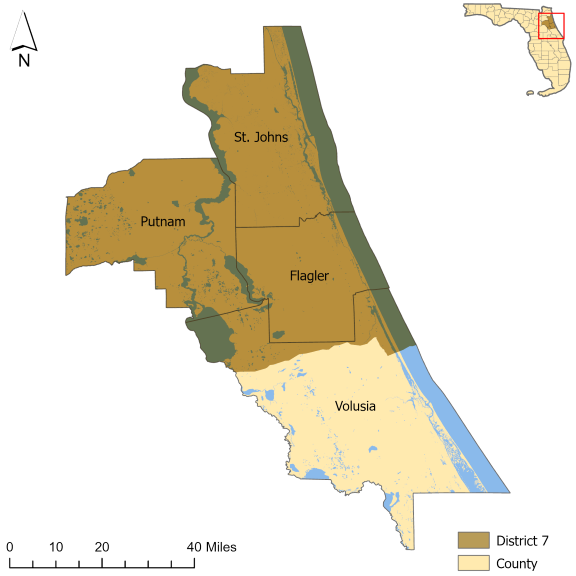
- Interactive map of district boundary since January 3, 2023
Senator
Tom Leek; R–Ormond Beach
- Demographics: 76% White; 7% Black; 10% Hispanic; 3% Asian; 4% Multiracial
- Population (2023): 568,989

Florida's 7th Senate district elects one member to the Florida Senate. The district consists of Flagler and St. Johns counties, as well as portions of northern Volusia County, in the U.S. state of Florida. The current senator is Republican Tom Leek.

== List of senators ==
NOTE: The following information was gathered from the Florida Senate website. Only records of senators from 1998–present are kept.

Portrait	Name	Party	Years of service	Home city/state	Notes
	Charlie Clary	Republican	1996–2002		Parts of Bay, Escambia, Okaloosa, Santa Rosa and Walton county; President Pro Tempore (2004–2006)
	Evelyn J. Lynn	Republican	2002–2012	Astoria, New York	Consisted of Clay, Marion, Putnam, Volusia counties
	Rob Bradley	Republican	2012–2016	Green Cove Springs, Florida	Consisted of Alachua, Bradford, Clay counties
	Travis Hutson	Republican	2016–2024	Jacksonville, Florida	Consisted of Flagler, St. Johns counties and part of Volusia county
	Tom Leek	Republican	2024–present	Columbus, Ohio	Consists of Flagler, Putnam, St. Johns counties and part of Volusia County

== Elections ==
NOTE: The following results were gathered from the Florida Department of State. Uncontested election results are not provided.

=== 1980 ===
Democratic Primary (1980)
Party	Candidate	Votes	%
Democratic	Dan Jenkins	39,444	69.9%
Democratic	Dan Scarborough	16,945	30.1%
Total votes		56,389	100%

Republican Primary (1980)
Party	Candidate	Votes	%
Republican	Jeff Burnsed	3,095	39.9%
Republican	C. Lee Daniel	4,668	60.1%
Total votes		7,763	100%

General Election (1980)
Party	Candidate	Votes	%
Democratic	Dan Jenkins	84,440	55.6%
Republican	C. Lee Daniel	67,559	44.4%
Total votes		151,999	100%

=== 1982 ===
Democratic Primary (1982)
Party	Candidate	Votes	%
Democratic	Arnett E. Girardeau	15,345	44.6%
Democratic	Andrew E. (Andy) Johnson	11,800	34.3%
Democratic	George Thomas Sessions	2,871	8.3%
Democratic	Eddie Mae Steward	4,425	12.8%
Total votes		34,441	100%

Democratic Primary Runoff (1982)
Party	Candidate	Votes	%
Democratic	Arnett E. Girardeau	16,594	59.9%
Democratic	Andrew E. (Andy) Johnson	11,086	40.1%
Total votes		27,680	100%

General Election (1982)
Party	Candidate	Votes	%
Democratic	Arnett E. Girardeau	29,086	66.6%
Republican	Kurt W. Becker	14,561	33.4%
Total votes		43,647	100%

=== 1982 ===
Democratic Primary (1982)
Party	Candidate	Votes	%
Democratic	Margaret C. Eppes	15,800	41.3%
Democratic	George Kirkpatrick	22,421	58.7%
Total votes		38,221	100%

=== 1988 ===
Democratic Primary (1988)
Party	Candidate	Votes	%
Democratic	Arnett E. Girardeau	15,838	72.7%
Democratic	Anthony Gomes	5,957	27.3%
Total votes		21,795	100%

General Election (1988)
Party	Candidate	Votes	%
Republican	Warren H. Folks	16,305	25.9%
Democratic	Arnett E. Girardeau	46,736	74.1%
Total votes		63,041	100%

=== 1992 ===
Republican Primary (1992)
Party	Candidate	Votes	%
Republican	Mike Bass	7,799	26.7%
Republican	Allan G. Bense	8,356	28.6%
Republican	John Phillip Halstead	1,721	5.9%
Republican	Robert Harde	11,306	38.7%
Total votes		29,182	100%

Republican Primary Runoff (1992)
Party	Candidate	Votes	%
Republican	Allan G. Bense	7,331	43.0%
Republican	Robert Harden	9,732	57.0%
Total votes		17,063	100%

General Election (1992)
Party	Candidate	Votes	%
Democratic	Mike Chesser	53,304	42.1%
Republican	Robert Harden	73,363	57.9%
Total votes		126,667	100%

=== 1996 ===
Republican Primary (1996)
Party	Candidate	Votes	%
Republican	Lois Benson	12,082	33.6%
Republican	Charlie Clary	10,774	30.0%
Republican	Francis N. (Mac) McMillan	1,225	3.4%
Republican	Rick Seltzer	9,482	26.4%
Republican	Joe Webb	2,356	6.6%
Total votes		35,919	100%

Republican Primary Runoff (1996)
Party	Candidate	Votes	%
Republican	Lois Benson	15,735	49.0%
Republican	Charlie Clary	16,398	51.0%
Total votes		32,133	100%

General Election (1996)
Party	Candidate	Votes	%
Democratic	Richard "Beef" Haddad	57,413	40.2%
Republican	Charlie Clary	85,262	59.8%
Total votes		142,675	100%

=== 2002 ===
Republican Primary (2002)
Party	Candidate	Votes	%
Republican	George Albright	9,395	35.2%
Republican	Jon Marc Creighton	3,339	12.5%
Republican	Evelyn Lynn	13,990	52.3%
Total votes		26,724	100%

General Election (2002)
Party	Candidate	Votes	%
Republican	Evelyn Lynn	80,873	57.3%
Democratic	Jim Ward	60,312	42.7%
Total votes		141,185	100%

=== 2008 ===
General Election (2008)
Party	Candidate	Votes	%
Republican	Evelyn Lynn	140,910	73.5%
Unaffiliated	Richard Paul Dembinsky	50,797	26.5%
Total votes		191,707	100%

=== 2012 ===
General Election (2012)
Party	Candidate	Votes	%
Republican	Rob Bradley	123,261	57.7%
Democratic	William Mazzota	90,285	42.3%
Total votes		213,546	100%

=== 2016 ===
General Election (2016)
Party	Candidate	Votes	%
Republican	Travis Hutson	174,320	63.9%
Democratic	Curtis Ceballos	98,378	36.1%
Total votes		272,698	100%

=== 2020 ===
General Election (2020)
Party	Candidate	Votes	%
Republican	Travis J. Hutson	212,577	61.7%
Democratic	Heather Hunter	131,763	38.3%
Write-In	Richard Dembinsky	13	0.0%
Total votes		344,353	100%

=== 2022 ===
Republican Primary (2022)
Party	Candidate	Votes	%
Republican	Travis Hutson	40,263	56.1%
Republican	Gerry James	31,486	43.9%
Total votes		71,749	100%

=== 2024 ===
Republican Primary (2024)
Party	Candidate	Votes	%
Republican	Gerry James	19,116	25.2%
Republican	Tom Leek	35,938	47.3%
Republican	David Shoar	20,917	27.5%
Total votes		75,917	100%

General Election (2024)
Party	Candidate	Votes	%
Republican	Tom Leek	237,377	68.3%
Democratic	George Anthony Hill	110,364	31.7%
Total votes		347,741	100%
