= Jerry Melvin =

American politician (1929–2020)

Jerry G. Melvin
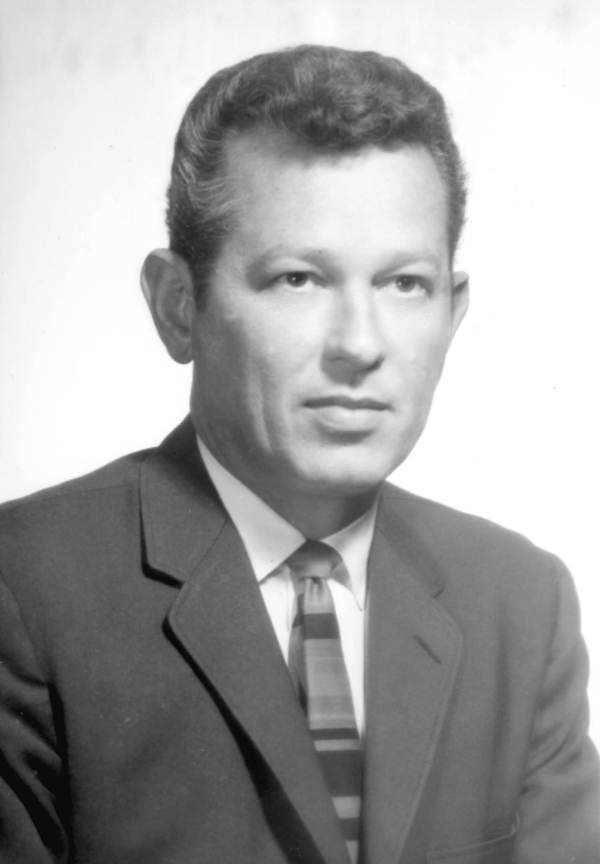

Member of the Florida House of Representatives from the 4th district
- In office November 8, 1994 – November 5, 2002
- Preceded by: Jim Kerrigan
- Succeeded by: Ray Sansom

Member of the Florida House of Representatives from the 5th district
- In office November 7, 1972 – November 7, 1978
- Preceded by: Ed Fortune
- Succeeded by: Ken Boles

Member of the Florida House of Representatives from the 7th district
- In office November 5, 1968 – November 7, 1972
- Preceded by: Sam Campbell
- Succeeded by: Wayne Mixson

Personal details
- Born: Jarrett Green Melvin; July 22, 1929 Bonifay, Florida, U.S.
- Died: February 19, 2020 (aged 90) Fort Walton Beach, Florida, U.S.
- Party: Republican
- Occupation: administrator

Jarrett Green "Jerry" Melvin (July 22, 1929 – February 19, 2020) was an American politician in Florida.

Melvin was born in Bonifay, Florida. He was an alumnus of the College of Charleston, American University of Washington, and Eglin Air Force Base Extension of Florida State University. Melvin also served in the Florida National Guard. He served in the Florida House of Representatives from November 5, 1968, to November 7, 1978, as a Republican, representing the 5th district. On November 8, 1994, he was elected to serve the 4th district; he would serve until November 5, 2002. In 2001, a resolution was passed to bestow the title of Dean of the Florida House of Representatives on him.
