= Northwest Florida State College =

Public college in Niceville, Florida, US

- Former names: Okaloosa-Walton Junior College (1963–1988); Okaloosa-Walton Community College (1988–2003); Okaloosa-Walton College (2003–2008)
- Motto: Educatio optima (Latin)
- Motto in English: "Best education"
- Type: Public college
- Established: 1963; 63 years ago
- Parent institution: Florida College System
- Accreditation: SACS
- Endowment: $38.3 million (2024)
- Budget: $46.4 million (2024)
- President: Mel Ponder
- Faculty: 80 (full-time); 170 (part-time)
- Undergraduates: 4,898 (fall 2022)
- Location: Niceville, Florida, United States; 30.5394°N 86.4756°W
- Campus: Midsize suburb
- Colors: Scarlet and silver
- Nickname: Raiders
- Sporting affiliations: NJCAA Region 8 – Panhandle Conference
- Mascot: Jimmy "JR" Raider
- Website: www.nwfsc.edu

Northwest Florida State College (NWFSC) is a public college with its main campus in Niceville, Florida, United States. It is part of the Florida College System, and is accredited by the Southern Association of Colleges and Schools, offering associate and baccalaureate degrees, and several certificate programs. NWFSC operates multiple campuses across Okaloosa and Walton counties.

== History ==
Established in 1963 by the Florida Legislature, the college was officially named Okaloosa-Walton Junior College in March 1964 and began operations in August 1964. In March 1988, the institution's name was changed to Okaloosa-Walton Community College to reflect its expanded role in various community services.

In April 2003, the Florida Board of Education authorized OWCC to offer baccalaureate degree programs. By December 2003, the Commission on Colleges of the Southern Association of Colleges and Schools granted approval for the college to confer bachelor's degrees. On July 1, 2004, the institution was renamed Okaloosa-Walton College to align with its new status. The college launched its first bachelor's programs in Project and Acquisitions Management and Nursing in Fall 2004. Additional baccalaureate programs in Teacher Education were approved in 2007, and the Nursing program became a stand-alone degree in 2008.

The State College Bill (SB 1716) passed by the Florida Legislature in 2008, and signed into law by Governor Charlie Crist, led to the rebranding of the institution as Northwest Florida State College on July 8, 2008. This legislation aimed to increase access to baccalaureate degrees and respond to community educational needs.

NWFSC offers baccalaureate programs in Project Management, Management and Supervision, Nursing, Elementary Education, Middle Grades Math Education, Middle Grades General Science Education, and Early Childhood Education. The college may introduce additional bachelor's programs in response to regional needs.

== Campuses ==
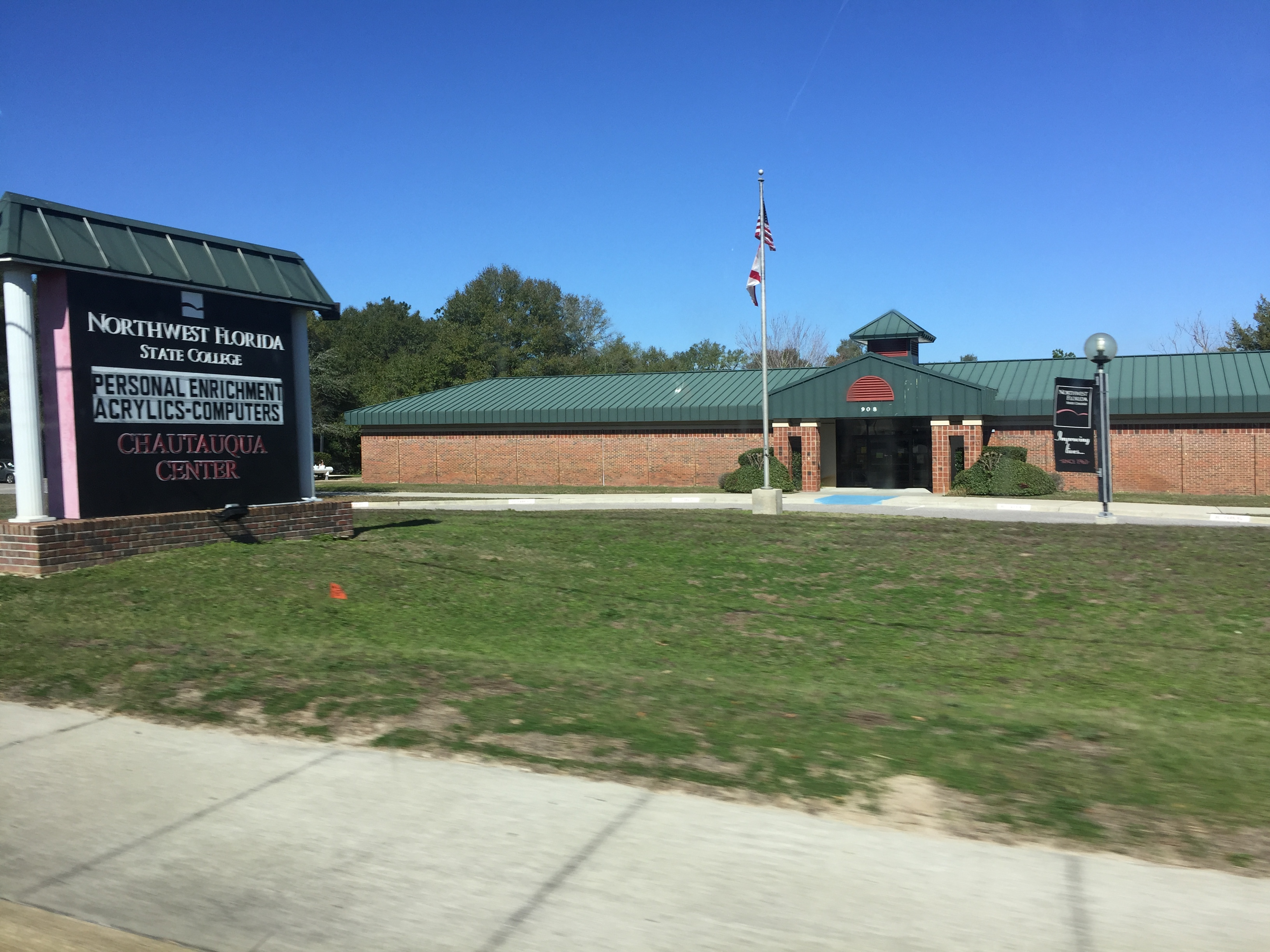
Chautauqua Center, DeFuniak Springs

The college operates a 264-acre (107 ha) main campus in Niceville, which was transferred from the Eglin Air Force Reservation by an Act of Congress in January 1966. It also manages a joint campus with the University of West Florida in Fort Walton Beach, and additional centers in DeFuniak Springs, Crestview, Santa Rosa Beach, and Hurlburt Field.

=== Collegiate High School ===
The Collegiate High School (CHS) at NWFSC, a charter school established in 2000, offers high school students the opportunity to earn both a high school diploma and an Associate in Arts degree (or transferrable college credits). Initially, CHS only provided an Associate of Arts degree, but starting in the 2022–2023 school year, it introduced a program allowing freshmen to earn an Associate of Science degree. Students can choose to remain in the AS program or switch to the AA program when they reach 10th grade. The school offers all educational materials and services at no cost to students, including textbooks, transportation, and technology. CHS has been recognized as a top-performing school in Florida and received the National Blue Ribbon School award from the U.S. Department of Education in 2006 and 2013.

=== Mattie Kelly Arts Center ===
The Mattie Kelly Arts Center is a major venue for performing arts and educational events. It includes a 1,650-seat main stage theater, a 195-seat Sprint Theater, the Mattie Kelly Art Galleries (McIlroy Gallery and Holzhauer Gallery), a music wing, a visual arts building, and an amphitheater.

=== Libraries ===
NWFSC has two library locations: the Niceville Campus Library, located within the Susan Myers Learning Resources Center, and the Emerald Coast Library at the Fort Walton Beach Campus. The Emerald Coast Library serves both NWFSC and the University of West Florida, while the Susan Myers Learning Resources Center includes the Zoghby Learning Commons, offering a range of academic support services.

== Athletics ==
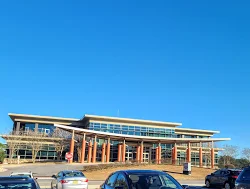
Raider Arena

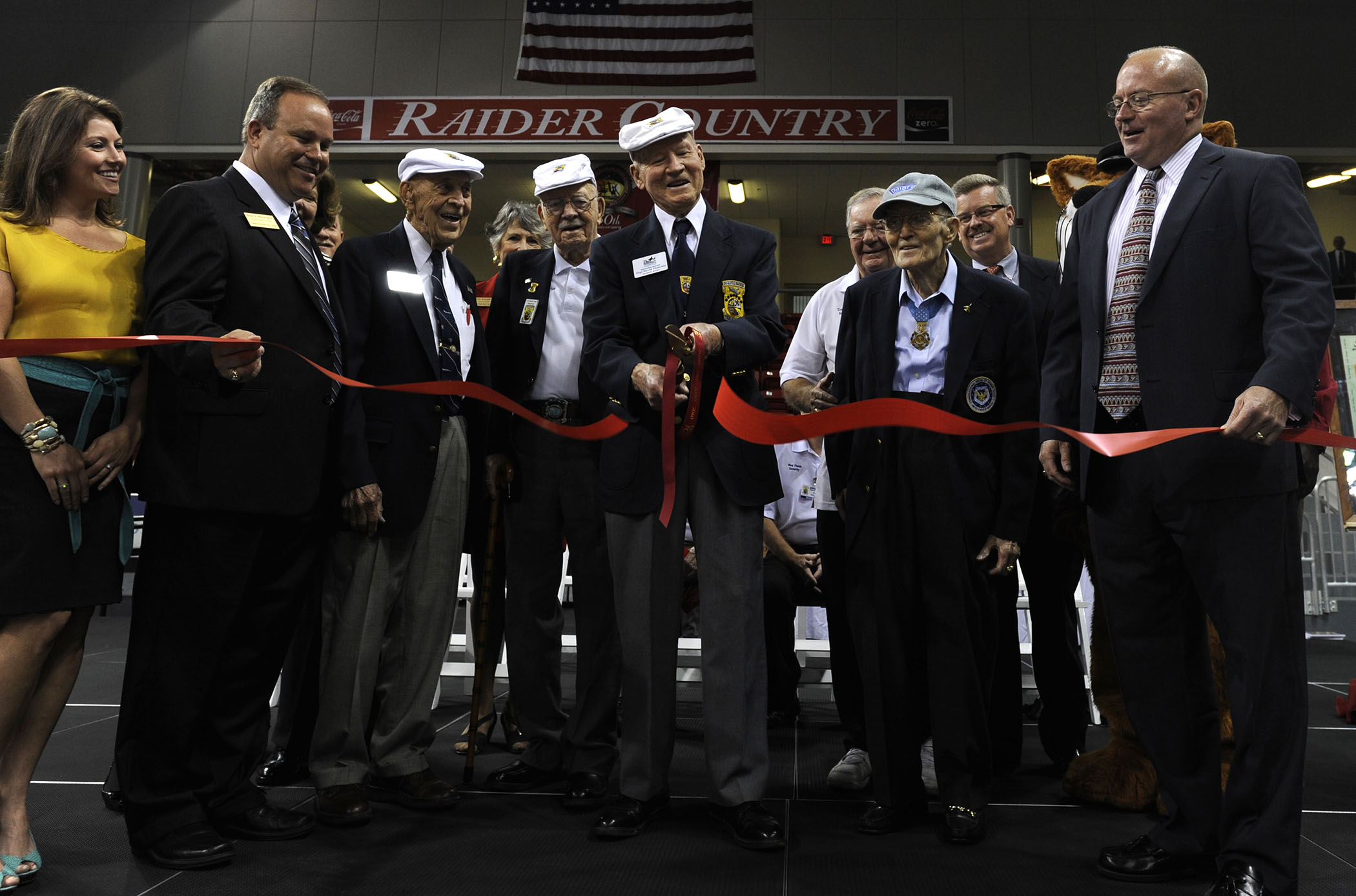
Grand opening of the Doolittle Raider exhibit in Raider Arena (2013)

The college's athletic teams compete in the Panhandle Conference of the Florida State College Activities Association, a body of the National Junior College Athletic Association Region 8. The teams' nickname is Raiders, honouring the WWII Doolitle Raiders, who trained at nearby Eglin Air Force Base (AFB) decades before land kept in reserve for the AFB became the campus for NFSC.

== Notable alumni ==
- Robert Coello, former MLB pitcher
- Chris Duarte, professional basketball player
- Andrés Feliz, professional basketball player
- Kedrick Brown, former professional basketball player
- Jason Michaels, former MLB outfielder
- Xavier Moon, professional basketball player
- Alan Ritchson, actor
- Ray Sansom, former speaker of the Florida House of Representatives
- Donell Taylor, former professional basketball player
