= Ashley Gibson Barnett Museum of Art =

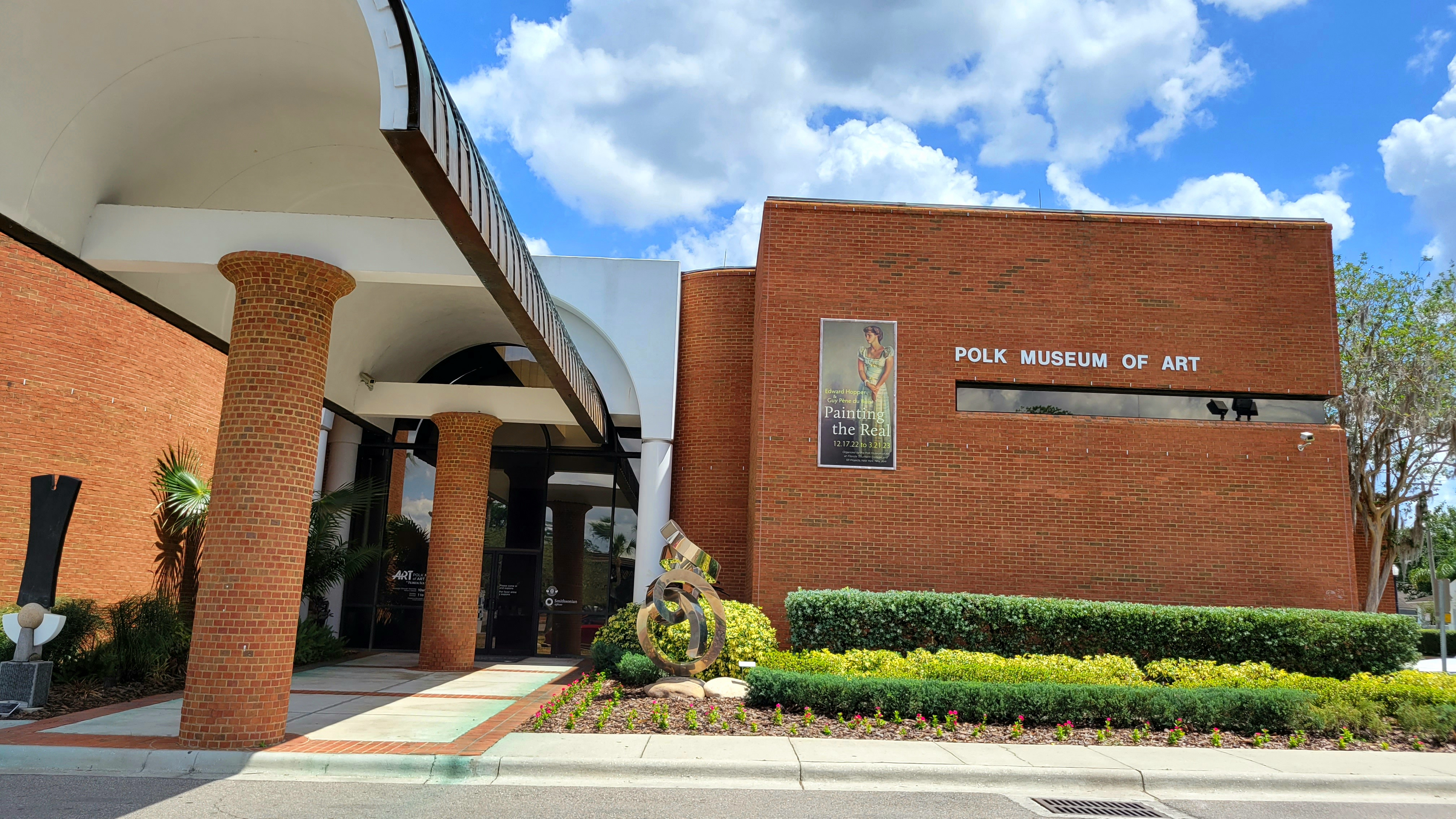

- Location within Florida Location within the United States
- Former name: Polk Museum of Art
- Established: 1966
- Location: Lakeland, Florida
- Coordinates: 28.03686°N 81.94895°W
- Type: Art museum
- Website: www.agbmuseum.org

The Ashley Gibson Barnett Museum of Art at Florida Southern College (The AGB), formerly known as the Polk Museum of Art, is a private, non-profit, and nationally accredited art museum in Lakeland, Florida. It is a member of the Florida Association of Museums, is ranked among the top art museums in the state of Florida, and is a Smithsonian Affiliate. Admission to the museum is free to the general public. On June 1, 2017, the Polk Museum of Art, a private community museum, entered an affiliation agreement with Florida Southern College in order to advance the mission of both entities and better serve the community.

== History ==
The museum was originally established by the Junior Welfare League in 1966 and was called Imperial Youth Museum. It was renamed Polk Public Museum in 1969 as part of its expanded focus on art, history, and science. The board of trustees for the Polk Public Museum acquired a vacant Publix Super Market in 1970. This property doubled the museum's exhibition and classroom facilities. The Museum staff then partnered with the School Board of Polk County to create a curriculum-based art education program for Polk County students. The museum's former name, Polk Museum of Art, was adopted as part of its first building campaign in the 1980s. The building was designed by architect Ernie Straughn and was completed in 1988.

In 2024, museum was renamed the Ashley Gibson Barnett Museum in 2024 after a donation from the Nicholas and Ashley Barnett Foundation. Nicholas is a grandson of Publix supermarket founder George W. Jenkins, and Ashley is a member of the Florida Council on Arts and Culture.

== Collections and exhibitions ==
The Ashley Gibson Barnett Museum currently displays art from the Pre-Columbian era through the contemporary, featuring hundreds of works each year in a variety of exhibits that often revolve around a central theme. It boasts a permanent collection of over 2,500 works including student work, Pre-Columbian Art, Modern and Contemporary Art, Asian Art, African Art, European and American Decorative Arts, and the sculptures in its outdoor gardens. The museum also dedicates much of its physical space to temporary exhibitions, including both local artwork and traveling exhibits, which provide diverse displays that include American folk art, modern masters, Japanese prints and textiles, African art, African American Art, a Moon Museum exhibit, and much more.

Ashley Gibson Barnett Museum also created a virtual exhibit on its website for viewers to browse virtually. This exhibit is called "Hindsight 2020" and features works from March 2020 through August 2020.

In affiliation with Florida Southern College, the museum houses a portion of the college's permanent collection.

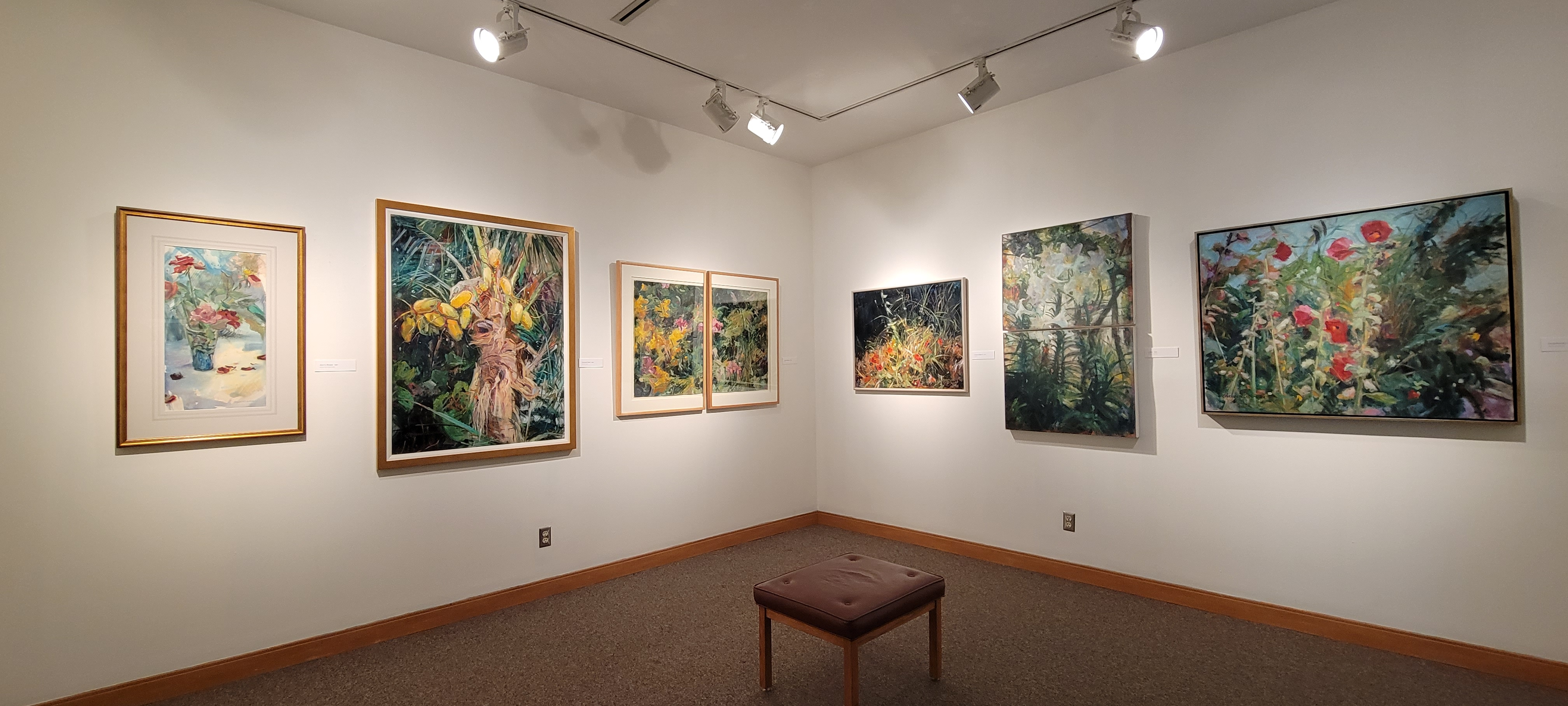
Murray Gallery on the second floor.

=== Modern and Contemporary Art ===
The Modern & Contemporary Art collection originally focused on Florida art. The collection now includes works by other Latinos, African-Americans, and Asian-Americans.

=== European decorative arts ===
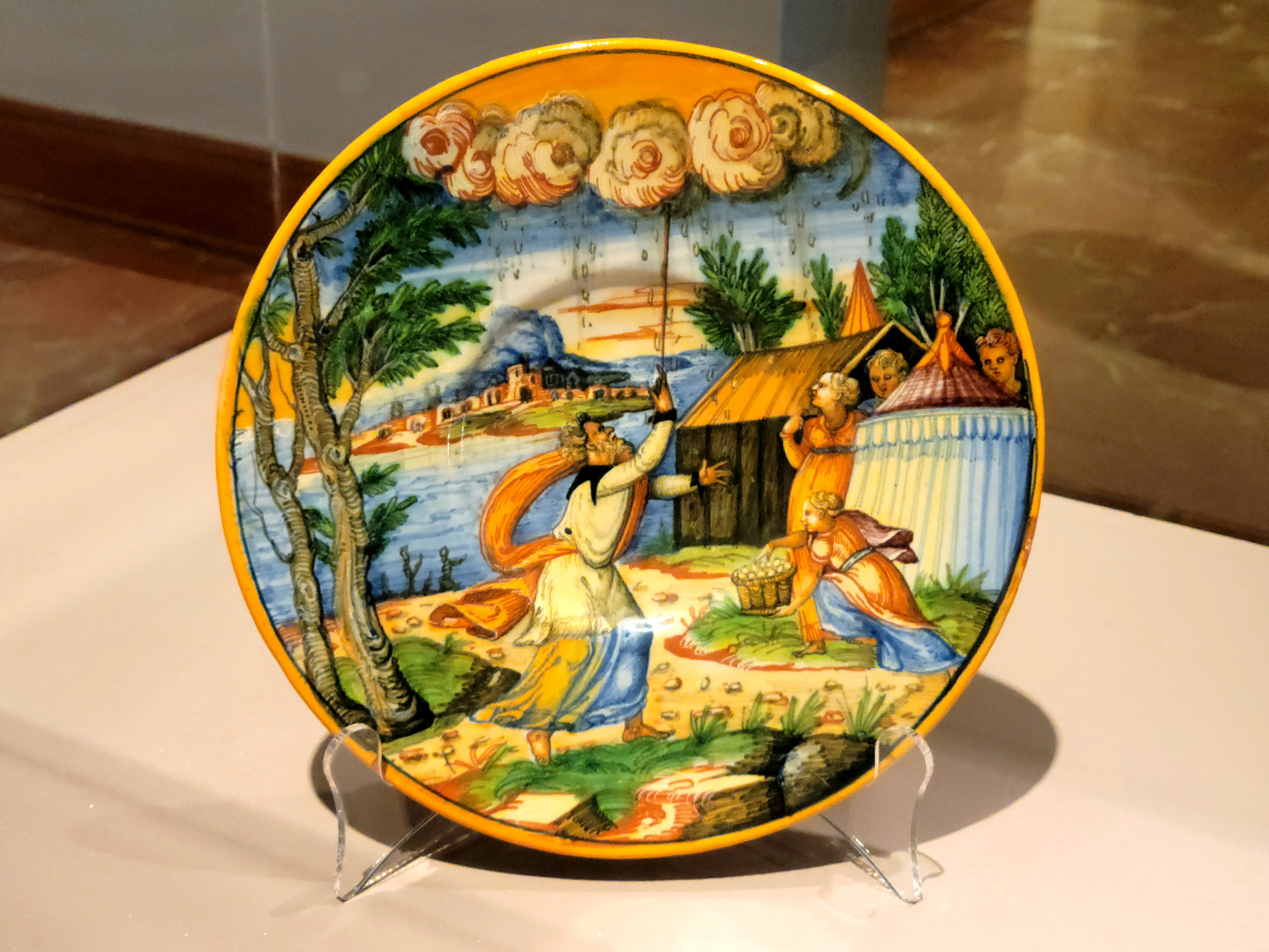
It Rains Manna (Piove la Manna) plate 16th century majolica.)

This collection includes European ceramics from the 15th to 19th century, English silver, and American silver from the 18th and 19th centuries.

=== African art ===
This collection originated in 2004 after a donation of 56 traditional pieces of work. The collection features a variety of media and includes work from numerous African cultures.

== Education ==
The Mission Statement of is that the museum "enhances the lives of our varied communities by bringing people and art together." Because of this, the museum invests heavily in its Education Department and educational programming for both children and adults. Some of these initiatives include tours of the museum, art camps for children and families, and classes and workshops on subjects such as photography, drawing, and painting. There is also a program called "Making Art Accessible to People with Dementia," where participants with dementia meet monthly to "create and discuss art." "Changing Lives Through Art" is the museum's outreach program, which aims to help at-risk members of the community, including teenage mothers and children in homeless shelters.

The free public charter school, Lakeland Montessori Middle, was formerly located on the second floor.
