= Carol Barnett =

Carol Barnett may refer to:

- Carol Jenkins Barnett (1956–2021), American philanthropist and businesswoman
- Carol E. Barnett (born 1949), American composer
