= Julie Fancelli =

American heiress and political donor

Julie Jenkins Fancelli (born 1949 or 1950) is an American heiress and conservative political donor. She is an heiress to the Publix supermarkets fortune and a member of America's thirty-ninth richest family. Fancelli's organizational efforts and donations played a decisive role in the January 6, 2021, "Stop the Steal" rally at The Ellipse that preceded the attack on the U.S. Capitol.

== Early life ==
Fancelli is one of seven children of George W. Jenkins, the founder of the Publix supermarket chain, and Anne MacGregor. She attended the Mount Vernon Seminary in Washington, D.C., and the University of Florida in Gainesville.

== Business endeavors ==
Until 2017, Fancelli owned Alma Food Imports, Inc., a company that sold millions of dollars' worth of products to Publix, including $1.7 million in 1996. Publix stopped using Alma as a vendor after Fancelli's departure.

From at least the late 1980s, Fancelli owned two Italian restaurants in Florida. She co-owns a private golf club in Lakeland with her relatives.

== Political contributions ==
Since the beginning of the 21st century, Fancelli donated hundreds of thousands of dollars to Republican candidates and party organizations.

In 2017, Fancelli met with Republican National Committee Chairwoman Ronna McDaniel to express her concern that the Republican Party had not done enough to help Trump in the 2016 presidential election. Fancelli increased her donations after the election of Donald Trump. Many of her donations were associated with Caroline Wren, a Trump fundraiser closely associated with the 2021 United States Capitol attack, and Kimberly Guilfoyle; after a call directly from Guilfoyle in July 2020, Fancelli donated $250,000 to the Trump campaign. During the 2020 election cycle, Fancelli ultimately donated more than $980,000 to a joint account serving the Trump presidential campaign and the Republican National Party. After the election, LJ Management Services Inc., a company closely linked to Fancelli's family foundation, gave a further $800,000 to a new PAC formed by two of Trump's closest aides.

In July 2021, Fancelli gave $1,000 to a candidate for mayor of Lakeland, who thanked One America News for "correctly" referring to Trump as the president after President Biden was inaugurated. In September 2021, she gave $5,800 to Rep. Matt Rosendale of Montana, one of 21 House Republicans who opposed awarding the Congressional Gold Medal to police officers who defended the U.S. Capitol on January 6.

In total, Fancelli donated more than $2.5 million to political causes in 2020, with most or all of it going to right-wing and far-right candidates and causes.

=== Association with the 2021 United States Capitol attack ===
On December 29, 2020, Fancelli donated $150,000 to the nonprofit arm of the Republican Attorneys General Association, the Rule of Law Defense Fund. That money was subsequently used to pay for robocalls promoting the "Stop the Steal" rally at the Ellipse on January 6.

Working in association with Alex Jones, the far-right American radio host, on December 29, 2020, Fancelli donated $300,000 to Women for America First to organize a "Stop the Steal" rally in Washington, D.C., on January 6. Fancelli, who was reportedly a "regular listener" of Jones's show, had an assistant call Jones to discuss possible ways to undermine president-elect Joe Biden's victory, and Fancelli and Jones spoke directly at least once between December 27, 2020, and January 1, 2021. Fancelli selected Caroline Wren, a Trump fundraiser, to organize the event; this was done in through Women for America First, the organization that obtained the permit for the January 6 rally at The Ellipse, while Wren was officially listed as a "VIP Advisor" on event permits. The event itself featured speeches by then-President Donald Trump, Donald Trump Jr., Rudy Giuliani, John Eastman, Madison Cawthorn and others, and directly preceded the attack on the United States Capitol building. The Wall Street Journal described Fancelli's donation as the "lion's share" of the funding behind the "Stop the Steal" rally, while Axios observed "It's getting harder to see how Jan. 6 would have happened without Fancelli's money." Fancelli is the largest donor to the event whose identity is publicly known.

On December 29, 2020, Fancelli also donated $200,000 to the Tea Party Express, which used the money for advertisements on radio and social media urging supporters of President Donald Trump to attend the rally and subsequent march.

As of December 2021, Fancelli's donations to events associated with the 2021 United States Capitol attack were revealed to be at least $650,000; the Congressional January 6 commission is still conducting further investigations. Fancelli had reportedly planned to attend the "Stop the Steal" rally herself and had booked a room at the Willard Hotel, but decided not to travel due to fears about the pandemic.

On December 8, 2021, The Washington Post reported that Publix had issued a statement saying: "We are deeply troubled by Ms. Fancelli's involvement in the events that led to the tragic attack on the Capitol on January 6." On January 31, 2021, Fancelli issued the following statement: "I am a proud conservative and have real concerns associated with election integrity, yet I would never support any violence, particularly the tragic and horrific events that unfolded on January 6."

== Personal life ==
Fancelli's family, including her six siblings, was ranked by Forbes as the 39th richest family in the United States, with an estimated net worth of $8.8 billion. Fancelli is not currently involved with Publix's business operations.

On December 31, 1972, Fancelli (then Julie Ansley Jenkins) married Mauro Adolfo Dino Fancelli, of Florence, Italy, in Lakeland, Florida; she met Mr. Fancelli while studying abroad.

Fancelli maintains homes in Lakeland and Longboat Key, Florida; and Florence, her primary residence. Fancelli is the president of the George Jenkins Foundation; in 2020, the foundation reported net assets of $27.7 million, and gave more than $3.3 million to charities that provide education, health care and social services to poor children and the elderly. Fancelli has also been praised for her commitment to the elderly.
