= Carol Jenkins Barnett =

American philanthropist and businesswoman (1956–2021)

- Born: September 30, 1956; Lakeland, Florida, U.S.
- Died: December 7, 2021 (aged 65); Lakeland, Florida, U.S.
- Education: Emory University; Florida Southern College
- Occupations: Businesswoman and philanthropist
- Spouse: Barney Barnett
- Children: 2
- Father: George W. Jenkins
- Relatives: Howard Jenkins (brother)

Carol Jenkins Barnett (September 30, 1956 – December 7, 2021) was an American philanthropist, businesswoman, and the daughter of Publix Super Markets founder George W. Jenkins. Jenkins Barnett was president of Publix Super Markets Charities and a member of the grocery chain's board of directors. She was included in the Forbes list of The World's Billionaires every year from 2008 on.

== Early life ==
Carol Jenkins was the daughter of Anne MacGregor and George W. Jenkins. Jenkins Barnett is one of six children: Howard, David, Julie, Nancy and Kenneth. Barnett attended Emory University but later transferred to Florida Southern College in Lakeland, Florida. Her father, George W. Jenkins, founded Publix Super Markets. Carol was born in 1956 when Publix was in its heyday. Carol and her five siblings worked at Publix beginning at the age of sixteen. She said: "The way I grew up, everything was about Publix. We'd go to store openings. I remember attending the 100th store opening when I was eight. I was there for the glory years."

== Business career ==
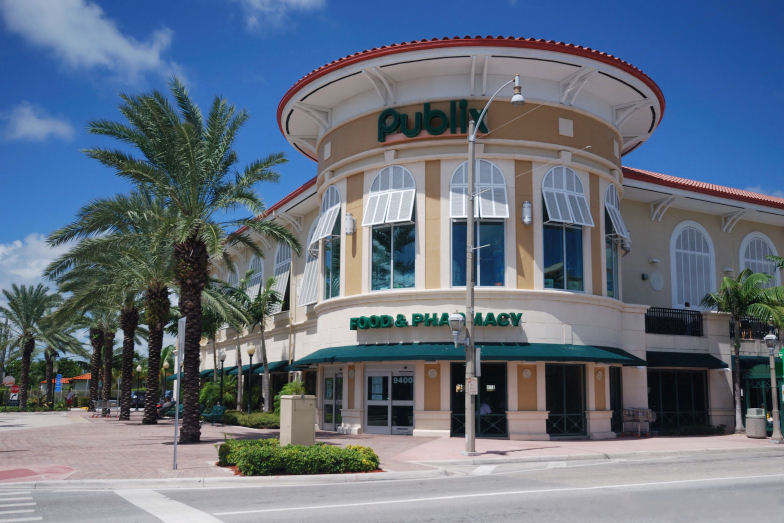
A Publix grocery store in Surfside, Florida

=== Board of directors ===
Jenkins Barnett was a member of the Publix board of directors from 1983 to 2016. During her time at Publix, the company grew into the largest supermarket chain in Florida, expanded into five other states, and recorded $32.5 billion in sales in 2015.

=== Publix Charities ===
Publix Super Markets Charities strives to provide the communities it serves with funding for housing with Habitat for Humanity. The charity also supports other causes such as food assistance, education, and youth programs. Between 1991 and 2016, Jenkins Barnett was president of Publix Super Market Charities. Jenkins Barnett helped lead the organization to donate $25 million to nonprofit organizations each year. She helped lead the organization to donate over $10 million to Habitat for Humanity.

== Philanthropy ==
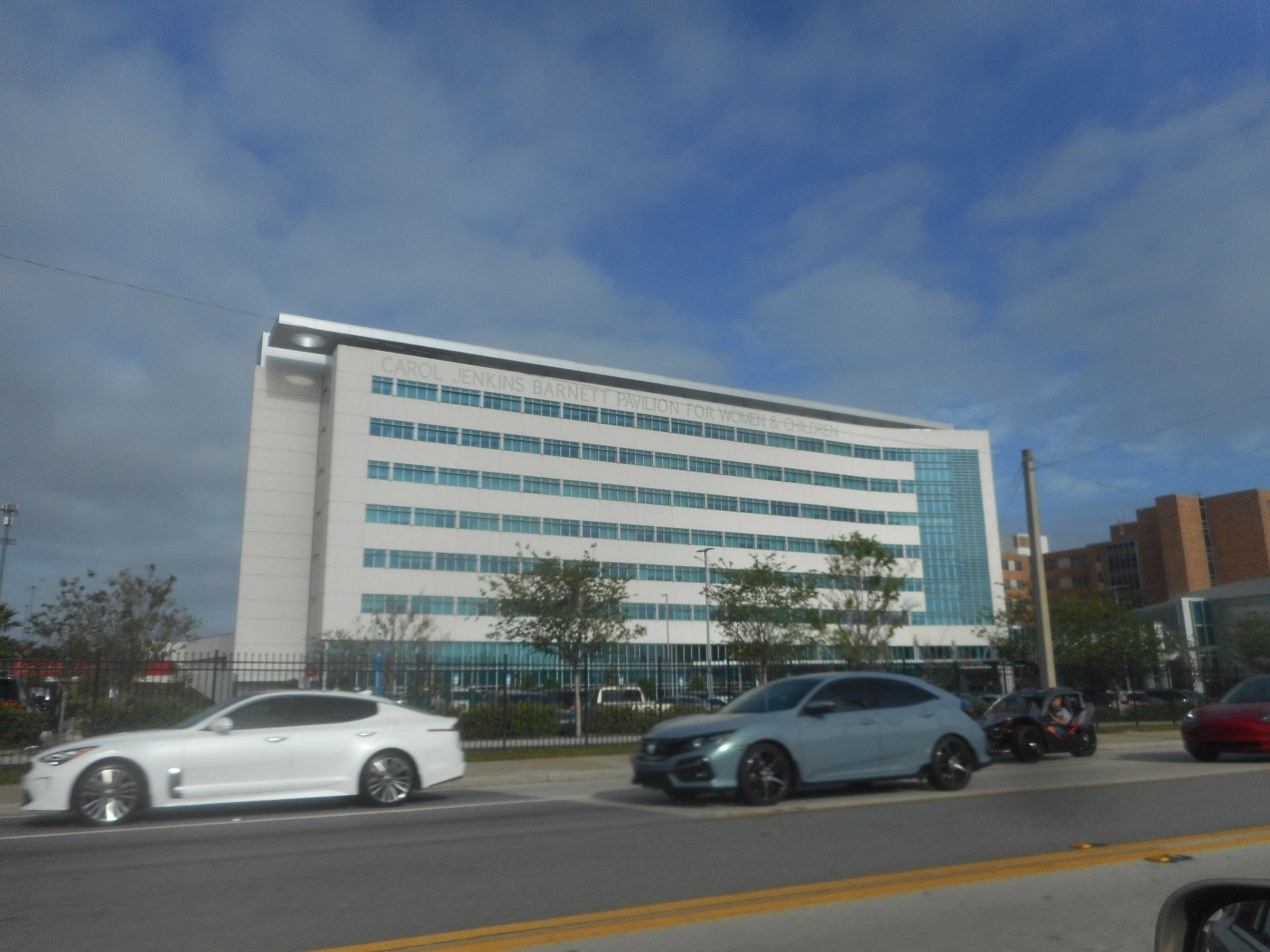
The Carol Jenkins Barnett Pavilion for Women and Children at the Lakeland Regional Health Medical Center, April 2021

In 2011, Florida Southern College announced an undisclosed contribution from Jenkins Barnett in honor of her husband, Barney Barnett, a graduate of Florida Southern. The funds were used to establish the Barney Barnett School of Business and Free Enterprise. The Barnetts also gave a reported $10 million to Florida Southern College to establish the Barnett Residential Life Center that was designed by Robert A. M. Stern.

In 2012, the Barnetts were the primary donors in a funding drive for the construction of a $5.5 million, 18-classroom learning facility at All Saints' Academy in Winter Haven, Florida. They gave $1 million to help launch the Carol J. and Barney Barnett Learning Center, which opened in 2014 at the Florida Aquarium in Tampa. To promote environmental conservation, the Barnetts donated $3 million to Mote Marine Laboratory and Aquarium in Sarasota, Florida in 2015. The Barnetts have donated millions of dollars to the United Way.

In 2016, the Lakeland Regional Health Foundation received a donation from the Barnett family in honor of Carol Jenkins Barnett for the Pavilion for Women and Children at the Lakeland Regional Health Medical Center Campus. The gift was the largest donation received to date by the Foundation. The new building was named the Carol Jenkins Barnett Pavilion for Women and Children. In 2025, the hospital announced the development of the Carol Jenkins Barnett Pavilion for Women and Children - South. The outpatient facility will expand on the original pavilion. The project was funded by a lead gift from Barnett's family to increase access to pediatric and maternal specialty care in South Lakeland.

Also in 2016, the Barnetts gave $800,000 to the Drug Free Florida Committee, an organization leading opposition to Amendment 2 to the Constitution of the State of Florida, which legalized marijuana for medical use in Florida.

== Personal life and death ==
Barnett had two sons with her husband, Barney Barnett.

In 2016, Barnett was diagnosed with early-onset Alzheimer's disease. She died from complications of the disease on December 7, 2021, at the age of 65.

== Awards and recognition ==
In 2004, Barnett was presented with the Florida Arts Recognition Award by the Secretary of State of Florida to honor people who support art and culture in Florida. She contributed to many Florida arts organizations, including the Polk Museum of Art, Lakeland Symphony Orchestra and Straz Center for the Performing Arts.

In 2015, Barnett received the Women in Philanthropy award, a national honor bestowed by the United Way Women's Leadership Council for her work developing a number of early childhood initiatives, including the ReadingPals literacy program that spread throughout Florida. In 2016, Jenkins Barnett was inducted into the Florida Women's Hall of Fame.

In 2017, Barnett received the Chiles Advocacy Award, Florida's highest honor for serving its children. The Barbara Bush Foundation for Family Literacy presented Barnett with its “Champion for Literacy” award. The Barnetts announced plans to introduce the largest park in Lakeland, Florida. Bonnet Springs Park, the 168-acre (68 ha) public park Jenkins Barnett championed as her final major philanthropic initiative, opened in October 2022 following an extensive environmental remediation of a former CSX railroad yard. In 2025, the park was named the Best City Park in the United States by USA Today 10Best Readers' Choice Awards. A named endowment, the Carol Jenkins Barnett Endowment, was established in her honor to ensure the park's long-term financial sustainability. Jenkins Barnett has served on the steering committee for The Children's Movement of Florida.

Barnett was named a notable member of the Association of Junior Leagues International, an honor given to only 18 women since the association's founding in 1901.
