= Florida Southern College =

Private college in Lakeland, Florida, US

Coordinates: 28.03138°N 81.94745°W

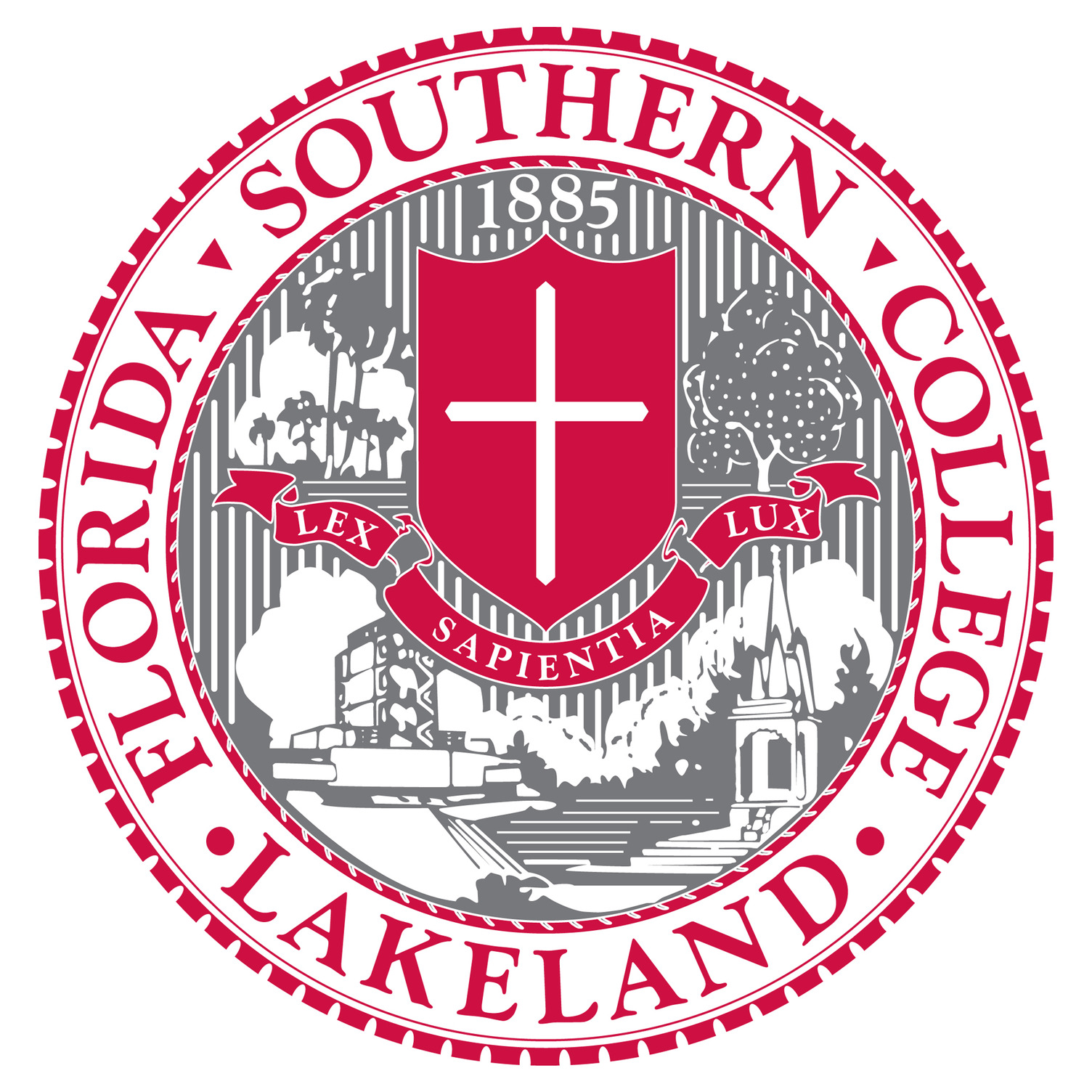
- Former names: South Florida Institute (1883–1885); Florida Conference College (1885–1906); Southern College (1906–1935)
- Motto: Lux Sapientia Lex (Latin); Light, Wisdom, Law
- Type: Private college
- Established: 1883; 143 years ago
- Religious affiliation: United Methodist Church
- Endowment: $121.45 million (2025)
- President: Jeremy P. Martin
- Faculty: 130
- Students: 3,074
- Undergraduates: 2,633
- Location: Lakeland, Florida, U.S.
- Campus: 113 acres (0.45 km^{2})
- Colors: Red & white
- Nickname: Moccasins
- Sporting affiliations: NCAA Division II – Sunshine State
- Mascot: Water Moccasin
- Website: flsouthern.edu

Florida Southern College (Florida Southern, Southern or FSC) is a private college in Lakeland, Florida, United States. In 2019, the student population at FSC consisted of 3,073 students along with 130 full-time faculty members. It offers undergraduate, graduate, and postgraduate programs. The institution is home to Child of the Sun, the world's largest single-site collection of Frank Lloyd Wright architecture.

== History ==
Florida Southern was founded as South Florida Institute in Orlando in 1883 and moved to nearby Leesburg in 1885. The institution's formal establishment occurred when it was sponsored by the United Methodist Church following the move to Leesburg. It was known as Florida Conference College from 1886 onward.

The college moved to Sutherland (now Palm Harbor) in 1901 and changed its name to Southern College in 1906. Due to fires in the early 1920s, it was temporarily relocated to Clearwater Beach and then finally moved to its current location in Lakeland in 1922. In 1935 it was renamed Florida Southern College. In 1966 the school enrolled its first Black student, Gwendolyn Gibson High.

== Campus ==
The present campus comprises 70 buildings on 110 acres (45 ha) of land and is home to the largest collection of Frank Lloyd Wright architecture in the world. The Florida Southern College Architectural District is listed on the National Register of Historic Places as a historic district due to the historical significance of its buildings. In 2012, the institution became a part of the National Historic Landmarks of the United States. In 2011 and 2012, it was selected as the most beautiful campus in America by The Princeton Review. In September 2011, Travel+Leisure listed it as one of the most beautiful campuses in the United States and noted that it was put under watch by the World Monument Fund as an endangered cultural site.

Florida Southern commissioned Robert A. M. Stern, the dean of Yale's architecture program, to lead their expansion efforts in 2005. Stern is an accomplished American architect who won the Driehaus Architecture Prize in 2011. The Stern-designed Barnett Residential Life Center was completed in 2009. The complex includes Nicholas and Wesley Halls, and houses up to 235 students in lake-view rooms designed to complement Frank Lloyd Wright's existing architecture on campus. The 4,000 sq.ft. Rinker Technology Center opened in March 2010. Stern also designed the Robert E. Christoverson Humanities and the Becker Business Building.

In addition to improving the campus proper, FSC also expanded outwardly by acquiring properties in adjacent neighborhoods. The institution acquired the Lake Hollingsworth Apartments and Lake Morton Apartments, a short walk from campus. In 2011, Lake Morton Apartments were renovated. As part of the Pathway to Independence Program, upperclassmen and graduate students may be invited to live at this location.

=== Collection of Frank Lloyd Wright architecture ===
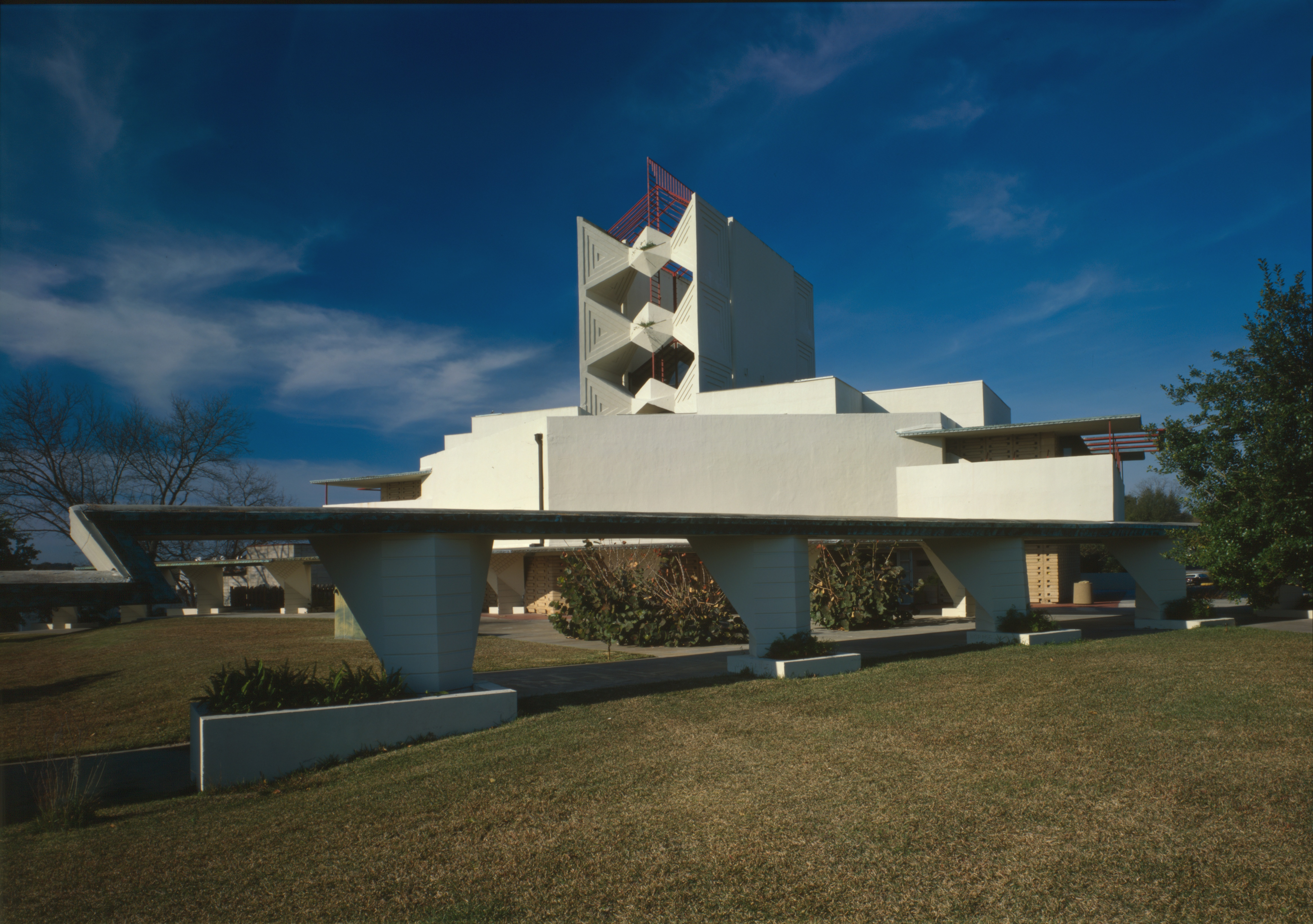
Annie Pfeiffer Chapel

In 1938, the Florida Southern College president, Ludd M. Spivey, approached Frank Lloyd Wright with the proposal of transforming the 100-acre lakeside orange grove into a modern campus. The collection of Frank Lloyd Wright architecture at Florida Southern College is called Child of the Sun. The name for the architecture came from Wright's idea of removing the "uninspired" buildings of the existing campus and replacing them with a campus that would, according to Wright, "grow out of the ground and into the light, a child of the sun." The works by Wright include the following:

- Annie Pfeiffer Chapel – begun 1938, dedicated 1941
- Buckner Building (originally the E.T. Roux Library) – begun 1942, completed 1946
- Ordway Building – begun 1950, completed 1952
- Danforth Chapel – begun 1954, completed 1955
- Polk County Science Building (commonly known as Polk Science) – begun 1952, completed 1958
- Watson Fine Building – begun 1946, completed 1949
- Water Dome – partially completed 1949, fully completed and restored in 2007 to Wright's original plans
- Three Seminars or The L. A. Raulerson Building – begun 1940, completed 1942
- The Esplanades – various completion times
- Sharp Family Tourism and Education Center, also known as the Usonian House, a visitor center and exhibition space constructed according to Wright's 1939 designs for faculty housing

=== E.T. Roux Library ===
The E.T. Roux Library, named for Florida businessman Edwin Timanus Roux II, is located on FSC's West Campus. The first Roux Library, designed by Frank Lloyd Wright for his Child of the Sun campus, was built in 1941–1945 for $120,000. Featuring a distinctive multi-tiered circular reading room, the building also contained book stacks and offices. In March 1968, a new Roux Library - named for both Edwin Timanus Roux II and his spouse Ulrica Antoinette “Nettie” Roux Roux - opened in a nearby location on campus. The new library was designed by Nils Schweizer in a mid-century modern style. Schweitzer was a protege of Frank Lloyd Wright and went on to have a successful architectural career in the state of Florida.

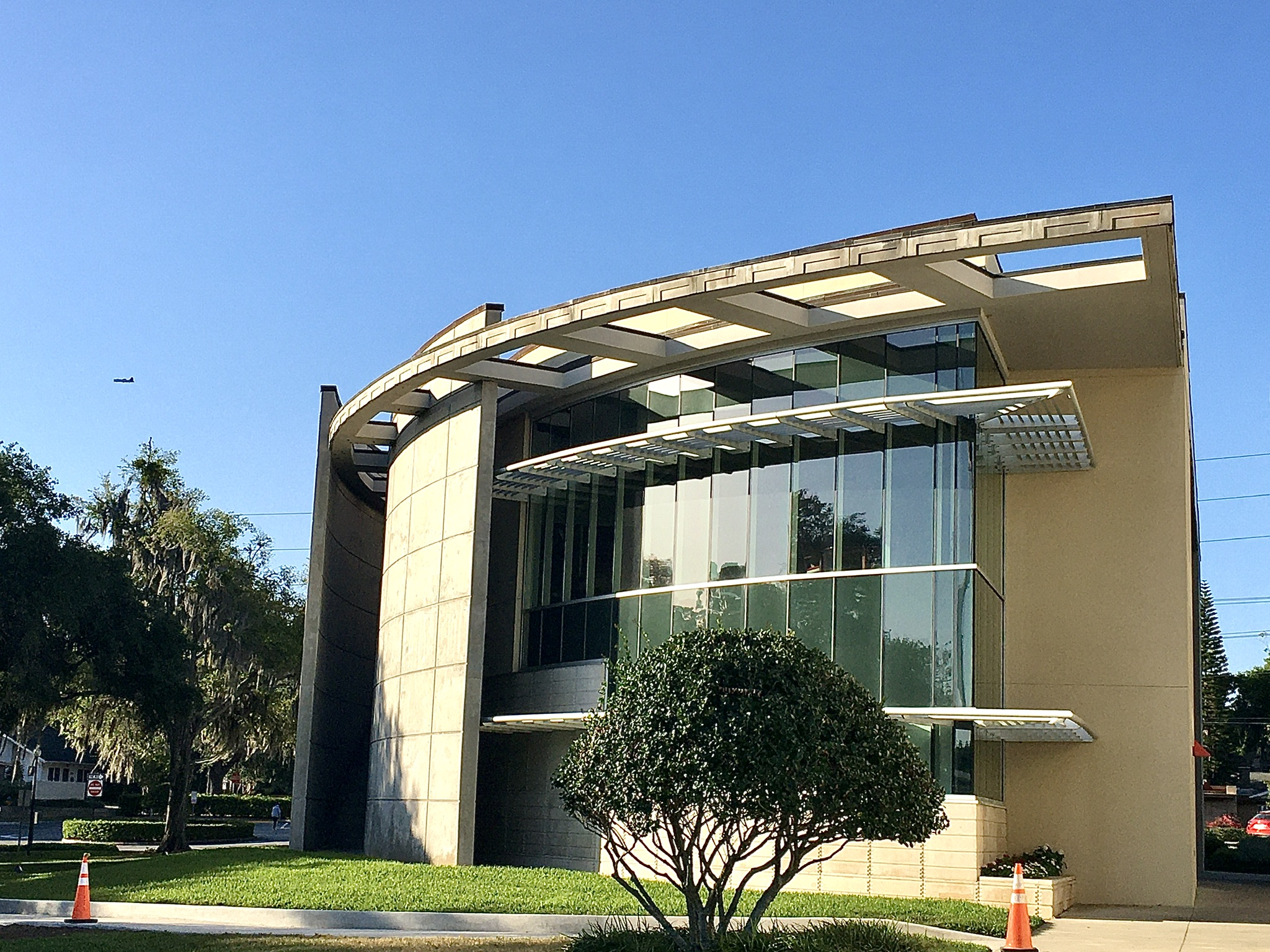
The McKay Archives Center in 2021

After Roux Library opened in 1968, the earlier library building was renamed the Thad Buckner Building and was used for lectures, seminars, and was the visitor center for the Child of the Sun campus. Today, the visitor center has moved into a new location. The original reading room is still used for lectures and can be rented for private events. Typical of Frank Lloyd Wright style, the original E.T. Roux Library was constructed of reinforced concrete and concrete blocks. Long, narrow windows crown the concrete walls and interspersed throughout the concrete walls are small colorful cubes of glass that cast the sunlight in prismatic patterns.

The McKay Archives Center is located adjacent to the second Roux Library. The archives is administratively part of Roux Library and maintains information on the history of Florida Southern College, alumni and faculty, in addition to its institutional records.

== Academics ==
Florida Southern College has over 50 undergraduate majors in a variety of disciplines and offers the Bachelor of Arts, Bachelor of Science, Bachelor of Fine Arts, Bachelor of Music, Bachelor of Music Education, and Bachelor of Science in Nursing. Florida Southern College is accredited by the Southern Association of Colleges and Schools Commission on Colleges to award bachelor's, master's, and doctoral degrees. Florida Southern receives over 11,000 undergraduate applications annually and admits approximately 51% of applicants using a holistic admissions approach, with 2022 first year students having a 3.8 average high school GPA, a middle 50% test score range for the SAT of 1170 - 1310 and middle 50% ACT of 25 - 30. Florida Southern uses the learning style of engaged learning that incorporates engaging, hands-on experiences in every academic program. Florida Southern College was awarded the William M. Burke Presidential Award for Excellence in Experiential Education in 2010.

=== Barney Barnett School of Business and Free Enterprise ===
In 2011, the institution announced an undisclosed contribution from Carol Jenkins Barnett ('79) (daughter of George W. Jenkins, founder of the Lakeland-based grocery chain Publix, for whom the school's gymnasium is named) in honor of her husband, Barney Barnett ('65). The funds would be used to establish the Barney Barnett School of Business and Free Enterprise. This gesture came shortly after Richard W. "Bill" Becker ('65) gifted $5 million to the School for the construction of a new undergraduate business building. Construction of the Becker Undergraduate Business Building and the Graduate and Executive Building was scheduled to begin late 2012 or early 2013. Like the Barnett Residential Life Center, these two buildings were also to be designed by architect Robert A. M. Stern.

Undergraduate students at the Barnett School of Business and Free Enterprise study in one of six programs: accounting, business administration, business and free enterprise, finance and economics, healthcare administration, or political economy. The school also allows students to focus on career tracks in finance, international business, management, marketing, and sport management. The Barnett School also offers the Master of Business Administration to full-time students in its 16-month accelerated program, as well as part-time students in the form of evening and Saturday classes. The Barnett School of Business and Free Enterprise was accredited by AACSB-International in 2013.

=== School of Arts and Sciences ===
There are five primary disciplines within the school: communications, fine and performing arts, humanities, natural science and mathematics, and the social and behavioral sciences. The school features a combination of traditional programs and interdisciplinary studies that includes the opportunity for students to design their own major through the "Venture into Adventure" program. The citrus science program has the nation's only citrus bachelor's degree program, including courses taught by industry leaders.

==== Biology ====
The Division of Biology offers the Bachelor of Science degrees in biology, biochemistry and molecular biology (BMB; in conjunction with the Division of Chemistry), Environmental Studies, Integrative Biology, and Marine Biology. Research courses are required, giving students the opportunity to investigate, compile data and present their results at the semiannual Department of Natural Sciences Poster Competition.

==== Fine arts ====
The music department maintains several large ensembles, including the wind ensemble, symphony band, jazz ensemble, symphony orchestra, and several choral groups. Each large ensemble is featured in concert at least once every semester through the Festival of Fine Arts. Smaller chamber ensembles are numerous. The opera theater usually produces an opera every year. Among music faculty have been Beverly Wolff and Robert MacDonald. Branscomb Memorial Auditorium is located on the Frank Lloyd Wright campus. Architect Nils Schweitzer, a protégé of Frank Lloyd Wright, designed the structure to complement Wright's original "Child of the Sun" concept. Construction was completed in 1963. Dedicated to Bishop John Branscomb of the Florida Conference of the United Methodist Church, the auditorium hosted its first performance in 1964.

The theater department puts on five main-stage shows a year in the Buckner Theater, including two musicals. A musical theatre major was added in Fall 2013. The institution's Festival of Fine Arts is the longest-running theater and musical performance in Polk County and has hosted artists Kathleen Battle, André Watts, I Musici di Roma, Jennifer Larmore, Sylvia McNair, and The Munich Symphony Orchestra. As of 2017, Florida Southern College was rated #19 Best Theatre Program by the Princeton Review.

=== Rankings ===
Academic rankings

Regional
- U.S. News & World Report: 11 out of 135

Florida Southern College was ranked by U.S. News & World Report as No. 11 out of 135 institutions in Regional Universities South in the 2025 Best Colleges rankings. The institution was also ranked No. 20 in Best Value Schools and tied for No. 9 in Most Innovative Schools.

== Athletics ==
Florida Southern's athletic teams are known as the Moccasins, often shortened to Mocs. Prior to 1926, Florida Southern athletes were known as the Southerners. The official colors are scarlet and white, though athletes sport red, white, and blue uniforms. Florida Southern is an NCAA Division II institution, the institution's athletic teams participate in the Sunshine State Conference (SSC).

Men's sports

- Baseball
- Basketball
- Cross country
- Cheerleading
- Esports - club
- Golf
- Ice Hockey - club
- Lacrosse
- Soccer
- Swimming
- Tennis
- Track and field
- Water skiing - club

Women's sports

- Beach volleyball
- Basketball
- Cheerleading
- Cross country
- Esports - club
- Equestrian - club
- Golf
- Lacrosse
- Soccer
- Softball
- Swimming
- Tennis
- Track and field
- Volleyball
- Water skiing - club

== Student life ==
As of 2015, Florida Southern College's student population consisted of 2,234 students, of whom 2,200 were undergraduate students.

Currently there are over 3,300 students from nearly every state and 50 countries

=== Convocation ===
Students are required to attend the quarterly Convocation, held in the Branscomb Auditorium. Past speakers include: Conservationist Jeff Corwin, Herbert Fisk Johnson III of S. C. Johnson, Jamie Tworkowski of To Write Love on Her Arms, New York Times' best-selling author Da Chen, and author-businessman Stephen Covey.

=== Student organizations ===
The institution has over 150 student organizations on campus as of 2026.

== Notable alumni ==
Notable alumni include athletes such as Major League outfielder Matt Joyce, first baseman Lance Niekro, pitcher Rob Dibble, infielder Greg Pryor, and pitcher Brett Tomko, as well as professional golfers Lee Janzen, Rocco Mediate and U.S. Women's Open champion Kathy Cornelius. Alexi Cortez currently plays professional indoor soccer for the Lakeland Tropics, whose head coach is alumnus Clay Roberts. Numerous leaders of the citrus industry also attended FSC including Citrus Hall of Fame inductee C. D. Atkins. Actress Charleene Closshey graduated from FSC as a business major in 2002. Other graduates include judges, politicians, a secretary general of OPEC, a U.S. State Department spokesperson, CEOs, correspondents, lawyers, and bishops.

== In film ==
FSC's campus has served as the setting for movies, including The Marriage-Go-Round (1961) and The Waterboy (1998).

== See also ==
- List of Frank Lloyd Wright works
- Independent Colleges and Universities of Florida
