= Howard Jenkins =

American businessman

- Born: 1952 or 1953 (age 73–74)
- Education: Emory University
- Known for: former chairman and CEO, Publix Super Markets
- Spouse: Patricia Jenkins
- Children: 2
- Father: George W. Jenkins
- Relatives: Carol Jenkins Barnett (sister)

Howard Jenkins (born 1952/53) is an American billionaire businessman, the son of George W. Jenkins, the founder of Publix Super Markets, and its chairman and CEO from 1990 to 2001. His family is among the richest in Florida and thirty-ninth richest in America, according to Forbes, with a net worth of $8.8 billion in 2020.

== Early life ==
He is the son of George W. Jenkins, the founder of Publix Super Markets. He has a degree from Emory University.

== Career ==
Jenkins was chairman and CEO of Publix from 1990 to 2001. Jenkins served on the board of directors at Publix until 2024 when he announced his retirement.

== Personal life ==
Jenkins is married, with two children, and lives in Tampa, Florida. His wife works for Apollo Environmental, which specializes in "hazardous materials consulting and analysis".

== Philanthropy ==
Howard and Patricia Jenkins donated $10 million to the University of Tampa, which both their children attended, and a residence hall was named in their honor.
