= George W. Jenkins =

American businessman and philanthropist (1907–1996)

- Born: September 29, 1907; Warm Springs, Georgia, U.S.
- Died: April 8, 1996 (aged 88); Lakeland, Florida, U.S.
- Education: Georgia Tech
- Occupations: Founder, Publix Super Markets
- Spouses: Lee Savings (m. 1940; died 1941) Anne MacGregor (m. 1947; div. 1974)
- Children: 7; including Howard, Carol and Julie

George Washington Jenkins Jr. (September 29, 1907 – April 8, 1996) was an American businessman who founded Publix Super Markets. As of 2016, the employee-owned, privately held corporation included 1,100 stores in the Southeastern United States with 170,000 employees and sales of $32 billion.

Jenkins was known as "the state's largest commercial employer and head of a chain of stores that was a leader in introducing many innovations, including electric-eye doors and frozen food cases".

== Early life ==
=== Georgia ===
Jenkins was born in 1907 in Warm Springs, Georgia. His family owned a general store in the community of Harris City, Georgia, catering primarily to farmers. His father Jenkins, Sr., was a member of the first graduating class of Georgia Tech and taught there after retiring as a grocer.

In the 1920s, the local cotton fields were decimated by the boll weevil, prompting Jenkins's father to move his business to Atlanta where people had money to buy groceries. Young Jenkins stayed behind to sell the remaining inventory and finish high school. In 1924, he also moved to Atlanta and enrolled at Georgia Tech, going to classes at night, and working days. Jenkins never returned to complete his academic education at Georgia Tech. Jenkins tried a series of jobs, including cab driver (he quit on the first day after getting stiffed for a fare), selling shoes (too slow), selling candy bars on consignment (nobody purchased them), and delivering grocery orders for his father's store. For reasons unknown, he never worked at his father's store to learn the business. He began as a clerk for Piggly Wiggly stores and after eight weeks, was sent to replace a manager who was recovering from an illness. From that point on, his job was temporary manager at all the owner's stores. He worked for the store for four years. Jenkins was not convinced that the grocery business would become his vocation, so he accepted a job selling real estate; he sold one house, collecting a substantial commission. However, his boss was convinced that a fortune could be made in the south Florida land boom. They made plans for the trip, but the wife of his boss refused to go, so Jenkins went by himself.

=== Move to Florida ===
About that time, a friend invited Jenkins to join him on a trip to visit family in Sarasota. They stopped in Gainesville, but Jenkins's sister had left on a family visit herself, so the friend took him on to Tampa, where Jenkins knew a man who managed a laundry. That friend encouraged Jenkins to stay the week and—while viewing the sights—they visited another man who owned more than a dozen Piggly Wiggly markets. After learning of Jenkins's grocery experience in Atlanta, the man offered him a job. Jenkins accepted, intending to return to school in the fall. Within a few weeks, however, his boss was so impressed that Jenkins was promoted to manage the store in St. Petersburg and school was postponed. By keeping his store well-stocked and clean, Jenkins saw his sales more than quadruple in less than a year. He was transferred to the company's largest store in Winter Haven, which he managed for four years.

In 1930, Florida was reeling following the real estate bubble burst in 1925, followed by the 1926 Miami hurricane, the 1928 Okeechobee hurricane, and the Wall Street crash of 1929. The chain's owner was forced to sell his stores, which were purchased by a businessman in Atlanta. The new owner chose not to visit his new property, so Jenkins decided to visit him to talk about the future. Jenkins drove to Atlanta, visited the man's office, introduced himself to the secretary, and asked to see the owner. The response was that the owner was not available due to a critical business consultation, but Jenkins could hear the owner talking on the telephone about his golf game. Enraged, Jenkins returned to Winter Haven and began plotting a strategy. He decided to open his own store and compete directly with the new owner.

== Publix ==
Jenkins began his retail career as a stocker at a Piggly Wiggly. After a few months he became the manager. Jenkins began coming up with ideas on how to improve the store, but he was demeaned by the store's owner. In 1930, Jenkins quit his manager position to start Publix Food Store right next to the Piggly Wiggly.

Although the country was in the midst of the Great Depression, Jenkins incorporated Publix Food Stores in 1930 with 30 shares, each valued at $100. He kept 13 for himself and sold four to friends. The butcher and assistant manager at Piggly Wiggly each purchased another four shares, raising $1,200 to supplement Jenkins's savings of $1,300. He and five employees opened a new market next door to his former employer. The chain fought back, bringing in a handsome and charming manager from Miami who supposedly garnered all the customers wherever he went. The two stores began a series of one-upmanships, where the Piggly Wiggly store would offer a shopping premium and Jenkins's Publix would offer something better. The first year was difficult, but Jenkins's store covered its expenses while the Piggly Wiggly closed. As the economy improved, the store did better, and five years later a second store was opened on the other side of town.

=== First supermarket in Florida ===
During the depression, Jenkins had purchased an orange grove. In 1940, he used that as collateral to secure a $70,000 bank loan to build the store of his dreams, the first supermarket in Florida. Described as a "food palace", the building had much glass and marble, with a stucco exterior. There was a paved parking lot, and the front entrance utilized an electric eye automatic door opener. The interior was air conditioned, with bright fluorescent lighting, wide aisles, and music playing in the background. The open dairy cases were custom designed, and freezers offered frozen food. These features were unheard of in the grocery business at that time. The original two Publix stores were closed, but Jenkins realized that he would have to open many more stores to be successful.

=== Expansion ===
Building materials were scarce during World War II, so in 1945 Jenkins purchased an existing company: Lakeland Grocery Company of Lakeland, Florida, which operated a chain of 19 locations under the name All American Food Stores. Jenkins promptly moved the Publix offices to Lakeland's existing buildings; Lakeland remains the headquarters of Publix as of 2023.

Jenkins travelled frequently, for he was always looking for products and innovations to improve his stores. In the 1950s, bakeries and flower shops were added, delicatessens came in the 1960s, and in the 1990s, pharmacies and Presto!, a network of no-charge automated teller machines.

In the early 1990s, the chain began to expand outside of Florida, starting in Georgia. By 1995, there were over 500 supermarkets in three states with almost 100,000 employees and sales of $9.4 billion.

=== Employee policy ===
Jenkins was referred to as "Mr. George" by his employees, who were known as associates. Full-time workers were granted capital stock in the company and shared the store's profits on a quarterly basis. These benefits were eventually expanded to part-timers who worked at least 1,000 hours annually. The employee-ownership structure, organizational culture, and employee benefits made the company one of the best places to work for in the United States. according to outlets such as Fortune and Forbes.

== Personal life ==
=== Family ===
Jenkins married Lee Savings in 1940. She died less than two years later. In 1947 he married Anne MacGregor, a registered nurse. They had seven children. The couple divorced in 1974.

=== Death and tributes ===
Jenkins suffered a stroke on August 8, 1989, but continued to work and visit his supermarkets in a wheelchair. Jenkins died in 1996 at Lakeland Regional Medical Center and was buried in Oak Hill Burial Park in Lakeland. He left his wealth to the George M. Jenkins Fund (charity) and his family, which continues to control the company. Florida Governor Lawton Chiles stated, "George made a tremendous contribution to our business climate, but perhaps more importantly, he was a true civic leader who had a deep dedication to improving our communities."

== Philanthropy ==
Jenkins established the George W. Jenkins Foundation in 1966 to "improve Publix communities." After Jenkins's death, the foundation's name became Publix Super Markets Charities. Jenkins's daughter, Carol Jenkins Barnett, served as its president. In addition to local charities, the corporation supports five national campaigns: Special Olympics, March of Dimes, Children's Miracle Network, United Way of America, and Food for All.

== Honors ==
Jenkins received honorary doctorates from Florida Southern College in 1956, the University of Tampa in 1963, Stetson University in 1977, and Florida Institute of Technology in 1979.

Jenkins was elected president of the Supermarket Institute in 1961 and served through 1963. The article, "The Grocer the Girls All Love – George Jenkins, Lakeland, Florida" appeared in the October 16, 1954, issue of The Saturday Evening Post.

The George Jenkins Arena in the Lakeland Center opened in 1974 as a multipurpose entertainment facility with seating for 10,000. George W. Jenkins High School in Lakeland was named in his honor in 1993. Jenkins received the Horatio Alger Award in 2007, and was inducted into the Junior Achievement U.S. Business Hall of Fame in 2009. The state of Florida named him a Great Floridian in 2011, and the Florida Independent Business Association named him a "Florida Business Legend" for September 2011.
