= Publix =

American supermarket chain

Publix Super Markets, Inc.

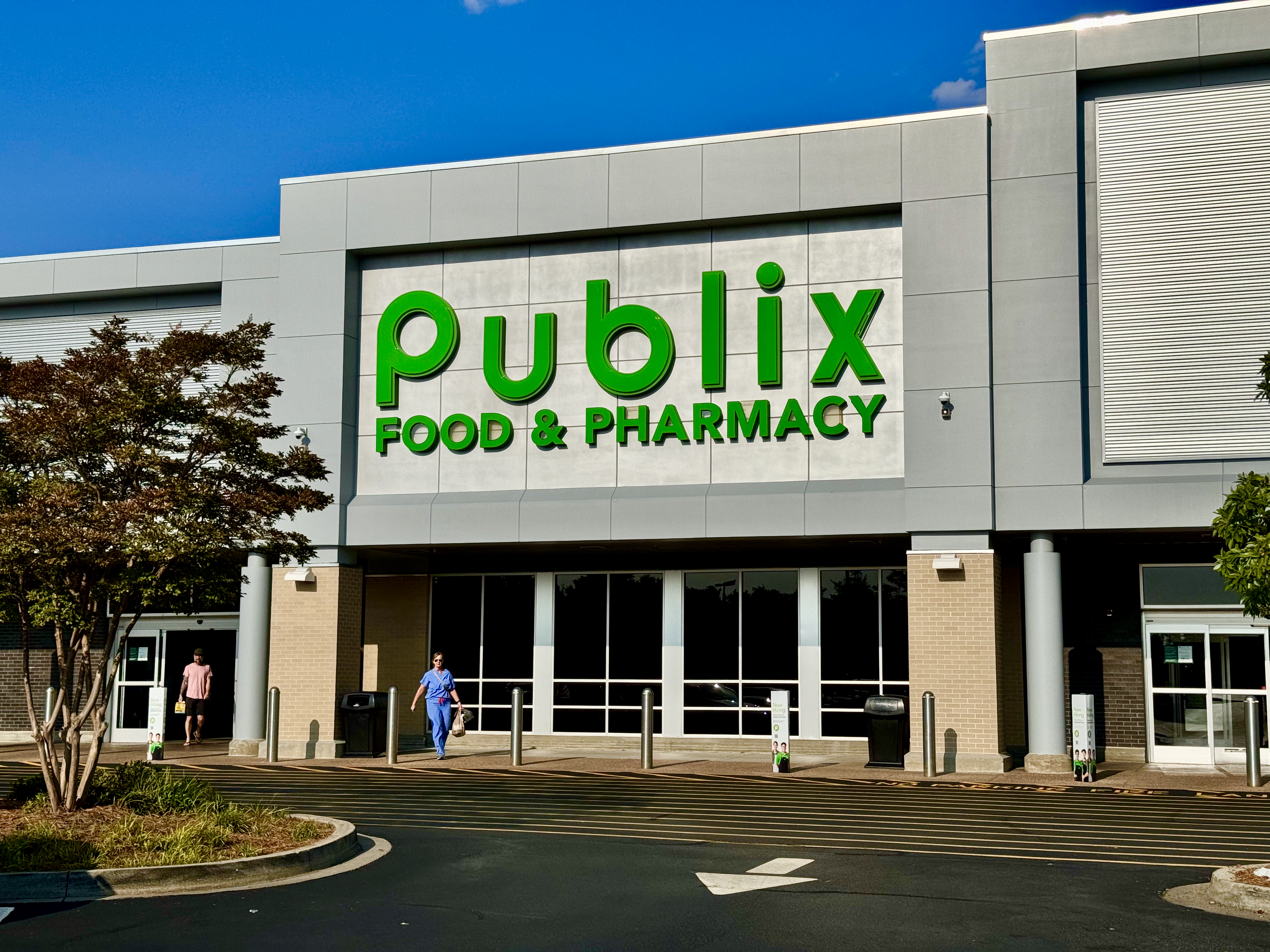
- Publix in Farragut, Tennessee
- Trade name: Publix
- Type: Private, employee-owned
- Industry: Retail
- Founded: September 6, 1930; 96 years ago Winter Haven, Florida, U.S.
- Founder: George W. Jenkins
- Headquarters: Lakeland, Florida, U.S.
- Number of locations: 1,455
- Area served: Alabama (97); Florida (899); Georgia (221); North Carolina (66); South Carolina (75); Tennessee (62); Virginia (24); Kentucky (11)
- Key people: Kevin Murphy (CEO); Todd Jones (Chairman)
- Brands: Aprons; GreenWise (products); GreenWise Market (stores); PIX; Presto!; Publix Sabor
- Services: Event planning; Money services; Online shopping and home delivery (via Instacart); Real estate
- Revenue: ▲$63.2 billion (2025); ▲$60.2 billion (2024)
- Operating income: ▲$5.81 billion (2024); ▲$5.44 billion (2023)
- Net income: ▲$4.73 billion (2025); ▲$4.64 billion (2024)
- Total assets: ▲$37.6 billion (2024); ▲$34.4 billion (2023)
- Total equity: ▲$27.43 billion (2024); ▲$24.67 billion (2023)
- Owner: Jenkins family (20%)
- Number of employees: 260,000 (2025)
- Website: www.publix.com

Publix Super Markets, Inc., doing business as Publix, is an employee-owned American supermarket chain headquartered in Lakeland, Florida. Founded in 1930 by George W. Jenkins, Publix is a private corporation that is wholly owned by present and past employees and members of the Jenkins family. Publix operates throughout the Southeastern United States, with locations in Florida (899), Georgia (221), Alabama (97), South Carolina (75), Tennessee (62), North Carolina (66), Virginia (24), and Kentucky (11). Kentucky is the most recent addition to the Publix footprint, with the company's first store in that state having opened on January 10, 2024, in Louisville.

Publix operates 1,455 store locations across the Southeast. As of May 2026, Publix employs about 260,000 people at its retail locations, cooking schools, corporate offices, nine grocery distribution centers, and eleven manufacturing facilities. The manufacturing facilities produce its dairy, deli, bakery, and other food products.

The National Center for Employee Ownership states that Publix has the largest employee stock ownership plan of almost 6,500 organizations in the U.S.

== History ==
=== Early history ===
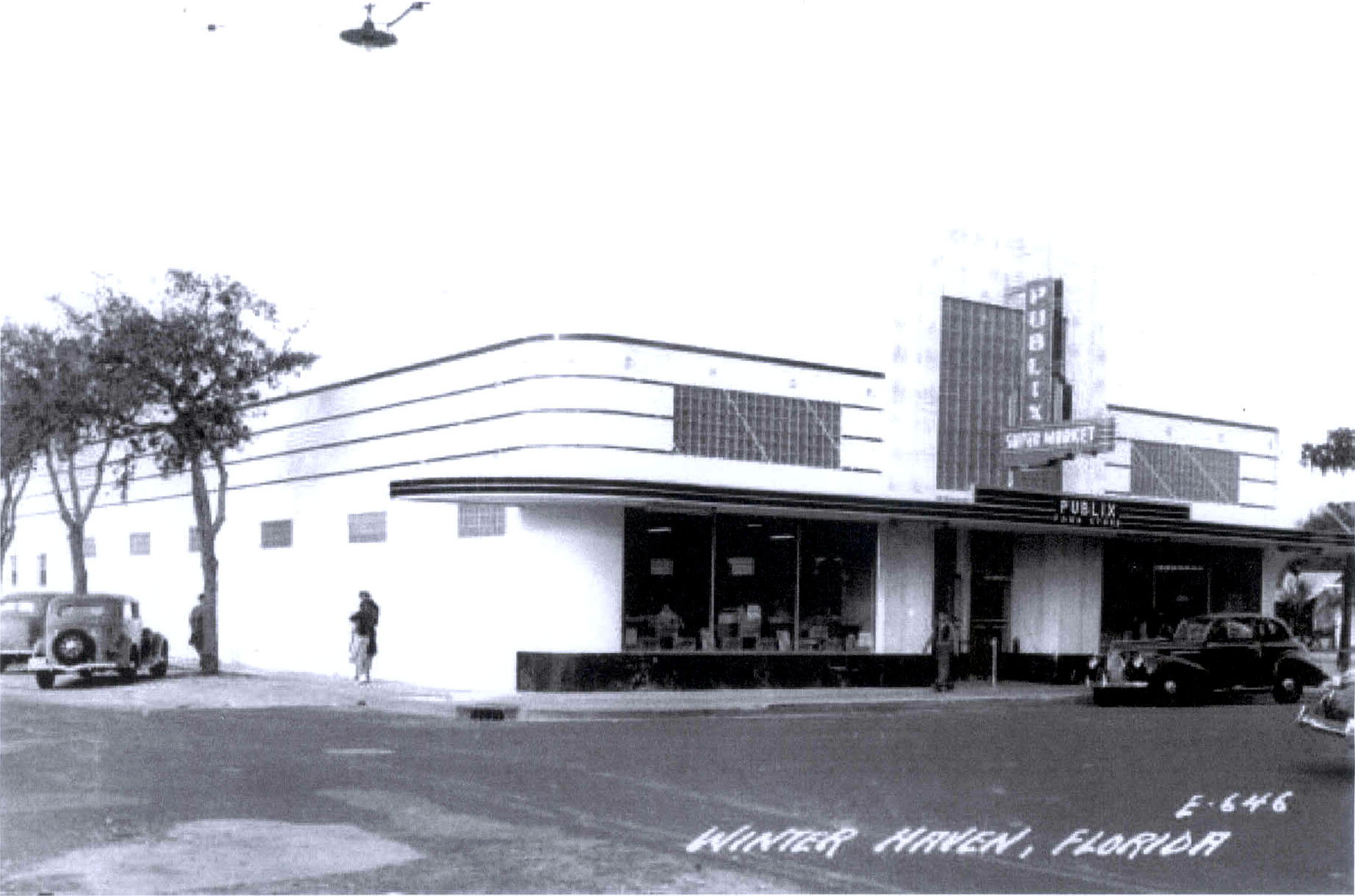
The first stand-alone Publix Super Market in Winter Haven, Florida, c. 1940. It is now a thrift store.

George Jenkins previously worked as a stock clerk and a manager at Piggly Wiggly from 1926 to 1930. Jenkins's store had been bought out by a corporation. Jenkins went to share some ideas he had for the business but was turned down by corporate because the CEO was busy playing a game of golf. Jenkins left the store and aspired to create a new store, one where all ideas from associates and others were welcome. He also believed that if employees had an ownership stake in the company, everyone would benefit. "Invest in Others" is a core Publix value that inspires pride and teamwork in associates and their leaders.

When Jenkins decided to open his own grocery store, he adopted the name "Publix" from a struggling New York-based movie theater company (with 19 opulently decorated movie houses in Florida) called Publix Theatres Corporation, a Paramount affiliate. Jenkins stated, "Most of the theaters were closing up, and I liked the sound of the name, so I just took it for my store." Jenkins opened the first Publix Food Store in Winter Haven, Florida, on September 6, 1930, a 3,000-square-foot building located at 58 Northwest 4th Street. Like the theatres, the store was air conditioned and utilized the Art Moderne architectural style.

In 1934, that store made $120,000 in sales. In 1935, he opened a second market, the Economy Food Store, also in Winter Haven. Despite the Great Depression, his stores were financially successful.

In 1940, Jenkins, called "Mr. George" by his employees, mortgaged an orange grove to build Florida's first supermarket. On November 8, 1940, his "food palace" opened at 199 West Central Avenue, having piped-in music, air conditioning, cold cases for frozen and refrigerated items, in-store doughnut and flower shops, and electric-eye automatic doors. During World War II, material shortages prevented him from building additional stores. In 1945, Jenkins purchased the 19-store All American chain of food stores and converted them into Publix Super Markets.

In 1951, Publix moved its headquarters from Winter Haven to Lakeland, Florida, and built its first distribution warehouse there. The warehouse occupied a 70,000-square-foot area. At the same time, they began to close the All American stores, replacing them with Publix markets. In 1956, Publix achieved $50 million in sales and $1 million in profit. In 1957, the donut shop in each store was expanded into a full-service bakery.

=== Expansion in Florida ===
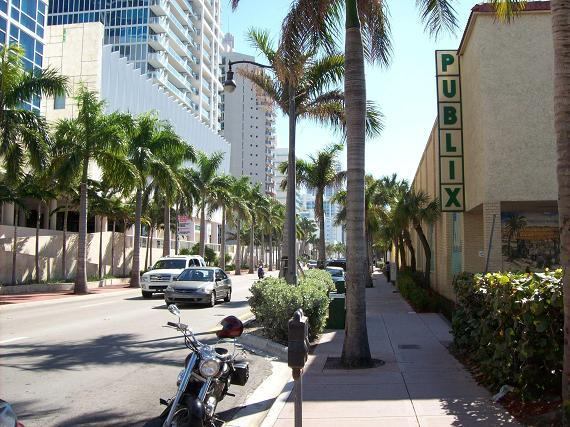
A 1960s-style Publix Super Market store marquee on Collins Avenue in Miami Beach, Florida

By 1959, Publix was the dominant supermarket chain in Central Florida, and began expansion to South Florida, opening a store in Miami and acquiring six stores from Grand Union. In 1963, the company built a distribution center in Miami, and began providing deli services. In 1970, sales surpassed $500 million; they reached $1 billion in 1974, when the chain expanded to include Jacksonville, Florida.

In 1982, the company launched the Presto! ATM network; it soon installed ATMs in every Publix. Sales exceeded $5 billion in 1989.

In 1983, Carol Jenkins Barnett joined the Publix Board of Directors and served in that role until 2016. During her time at Publix, the company grew into the largest supermarket chain in Florida, and expanded into five other states.

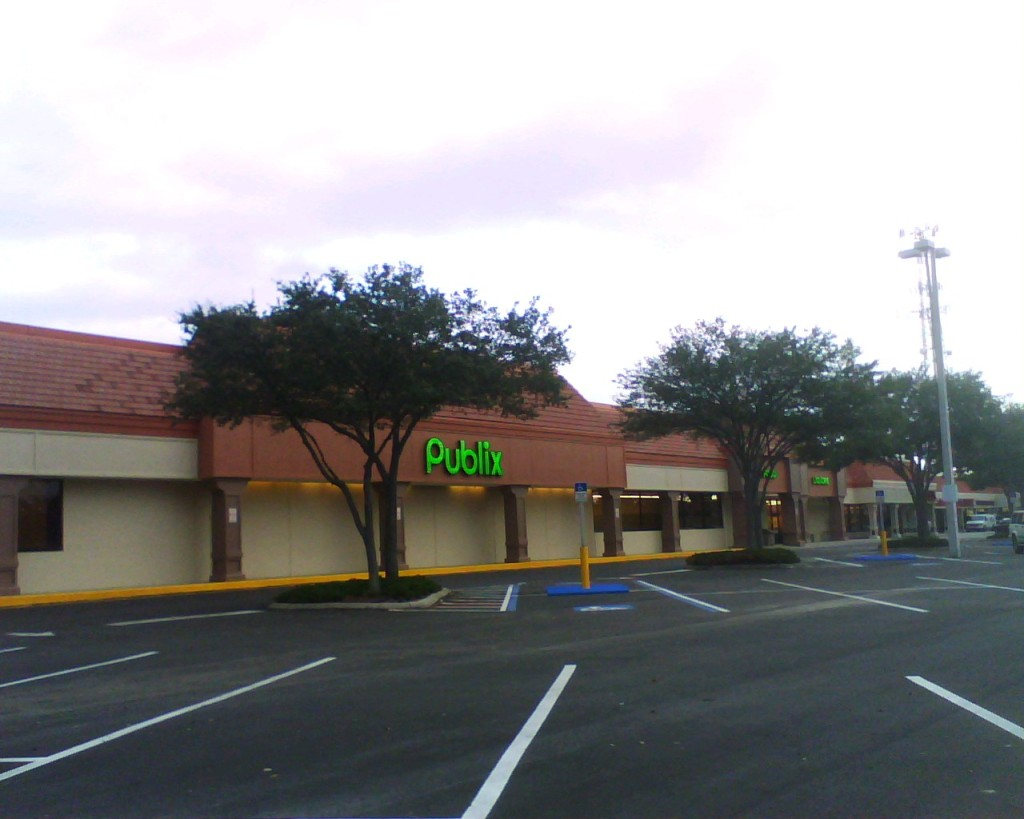
A converted Albertsons location in South Tampa, Florida

On October 5, 1995, Publix opened its 500th store in Miami, Florida.

Publix Super Markets bought 49 Florida stores from Albertsons. The deal was announced on June 9, 2008, and was completed on September 9, 2008. It included 15 locations in North Florida, 30 in Central Florida, and four in South Florida. The sale allowed Publix to operate four stores in a new market area for the company, Escambia County, Florida (the Pensacola area).

On February 5, 2009, Publix opened its 1,000th store in St. Augustine, Florida, becoming one of only five U.S. grocery retailers to achieve that number of stores. The St. Augustine store is among Publix's first stores designed to be energy-efficient. The store includes motion sensor lights throughout the store, including on the freezer doors, and an overhead light system that can be controlled by each department.

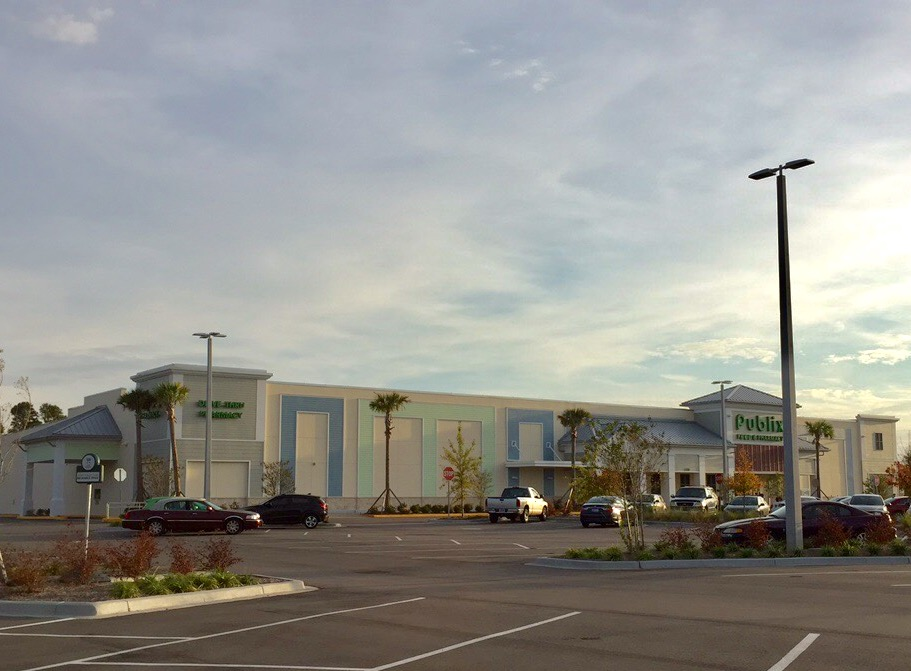
Exterior of Publix in Carolina Forest, South Carolina, which opened in 2016

=== Expansion to other Southern states ===
The first Publix outside Florida opened in Savannah, Georgia, in 1991; distribution and manufacturing facilities in Dacula, Georgia (a northeastern suburb of Atlanta), soon followed, as it entered metro Atlanta in 1993. Publix further expanded into South Carolina (1993), Alabama (1996), Tennessee (2002), North Carolina (2014), Virginia (2017), and Kentucky (2024).

In 2011, Publix announced it was expanding into North Carolina, initially by opening stores in the Charlotte metropolitan area, and later announced construction of a new store in Asheville. The first Charlotte-area Publix store (on the South Carolina side of the metropolitan area, opened in 2012); the first North Carolina Publix store opened in Ballantyne in 2014. Concurrently, Publix purchased seven Charlotte-area locations from competitor BI-LO stores. Publix completed the purchase of property in Boone, North Carolina, on November 20, 2015, with plans to open in 2017.

In February 2016, Publix announced their entry into the Virginia market, with the signing of two store leases, the first in Bristol scheduled to open in 2017 and the second in metropolitan Richmond scheduled for 2018. In July 2016, it was announced that Publix had entered into a purchase agreement with Ahold Delhaize for 10 Martin's Food Markets locations in the Richmond market as part of the divestiture of stores to gain clearance from the Federal Trade Commission for the impending Ahold/Delhaize merger.

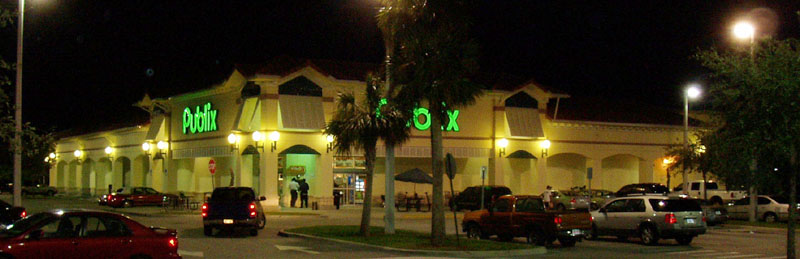
Standalone Publix in Pompano Beach, Florida, with typical architecture of early 21st-century stores

In April 2016, Ed Crenshaw, grandson of founder George Jenkins, retired from his position as CEO. President Todd Jones, a 36-year Publix employee whose first job was as a front service clerk (bagger), took on Crenshaw's responsibilities as CEO. Jones is the first member outside of the Jenkins family to have assumed the position. Ed Crenshaw will remain with Publix as chairman of the board of directors.

On September 7, 2021, Publix announced its first Kentucky location, initially expected to open in late 2023 in northeast Louisville near the intersection of the Gene Snyder Freeway and Old Henry Road. The first Publix Liquors location outside Florida is adjacent to this supermarket. The opening date was slightly delayed to January 10, 2024. Exactly three months after the Old Henry location was announced, Publix announced plans for a second northeast Louisville location, this one near the intersection of Ballardsville and Brownsboro Roads in the Worthington community. Expected to open in early 2024, this location will also feature an adjacent Publix Liquors store. On June 23, 2022, the same day that ground was broken for the Old Henry Road store, the company announced that it had signed a lease for a future store in Lexington at a development on the corner of Harrodsburg Road and Man o' War Boulevard. The Lexington store, including an adjacent Publix Liquors location, is planned to open in late 2024. A third Louisville location, on Shelbyville Road outside the Snyder Freeway in the far-eastern Eastwood area, was announced in December 2022 and is expected to open in the first half of 2024. It will also include an adjacent Publix Liquors store. New locations have also been announced for Owensboro and Elizabethtown.

=== Response to the COVID-19 pandemic ===
During the COVID-19 pandemic, Publix started working with the federal and state agencies and the Centers for Disease Control and Prevention (CDC) beginning in late January 2020. The chain closed food demonstrations, and increased sanitation and routine cleaning, as well as installing plexiglas partitions at registers and customer service desks. As of July 21, 2020, face masks were required for all customers in all Publix facilities.

During the pandemic, Publix said it would purchase milk and fresh produce from farmers and dairies in Florida who faced reduced demand as a result of school and restaurant closures. Publix said the produce, which would otherwise be discarded, would be donated to food banks of Feeding America.

Publix started to administer COVID-19 vaccines in early January 2021, with a 22-store pilot in the state of Florida with a focus on long-term care residents and staff, seniors, and health-care personnel. As of mid-February, Publix had provided more than 300,000 vaccines for customers in Florida, Georgia, South Carolina and Virginia. Publix has faced criticism over its extensive involvement in the distribution of vaccines in Florida, including allegations that it had curried favor with the Ron DeSantis administration by making a campaign donation through an affiliated PAC, and that Publix as exclusive distributor disproportionately favored wealthy neighborhoods.

Publix and the DeSantis administration deny that there was a pay-to-play arrangement; in an April 2021 interview with 60 Minutes, DeSantis stated that Publix "were the first one to raise their hand" when Florida sought distribution partners for vaccines in retail (noting that CVS Health and Walgreens were largely focusing on vaccination at long-term care facilities), and that 90% of Florida's senior population lived in close proximity to a Publix location, especially in Palm Beach (which has 65 locations, and was identified by the governor as "one of the most elderly counties"). These remarks were not included in the version of the interview aired by CBS, which has led to allegations that the interview had been edited to create a false narrative. The Democratic mayor of Palm Beach County, Dave Kerner, stated, "The reporting was not just based on bad information — it was intentionally false. I know this because I offered to provide my insight into Palm Beach County's vaccination efforts and 60 Minutes declined."

== Stores ==
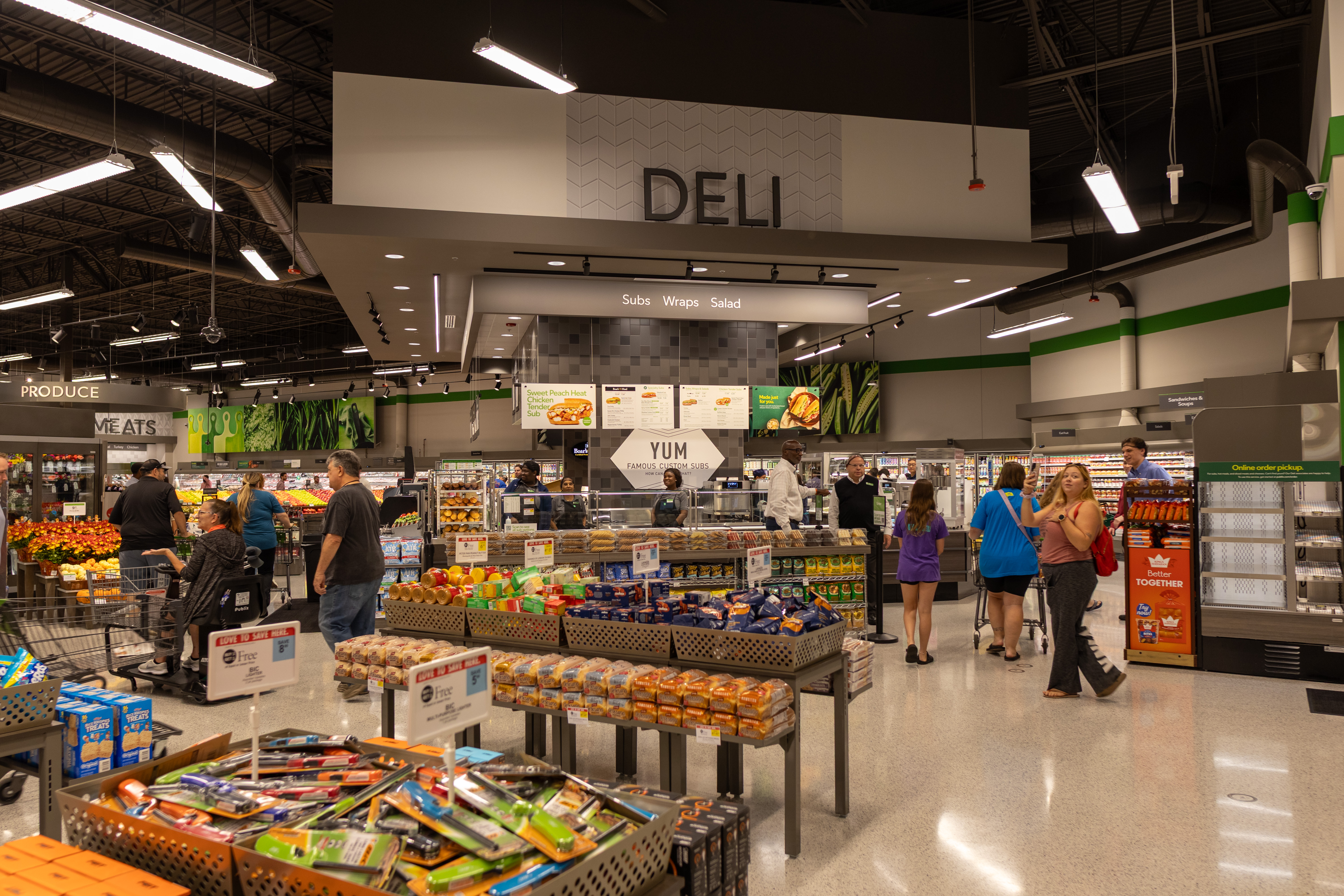
A Publix deli in Orlando, Florida

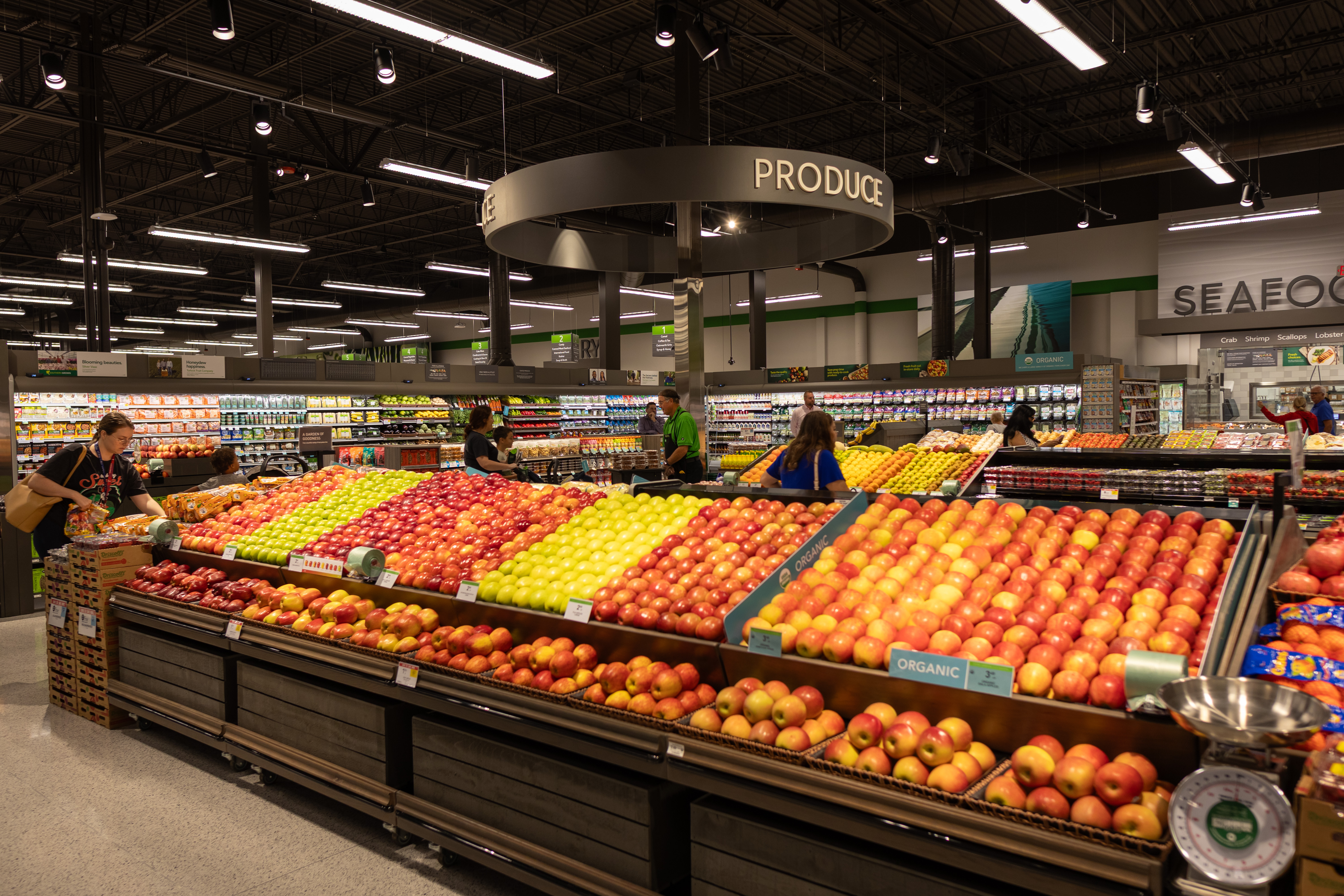
A Publix produce section in Orlando, Florida

Each store provides products and services in its grocery, deli, bakery, produce, floral, meat, and seafood departments. Some stores have valet parking, cafés, sushi bars, pharmacy departments, and/or a liquor store. The submarine sandwiches sold at Publix delis are often referred to as "Pub subs".

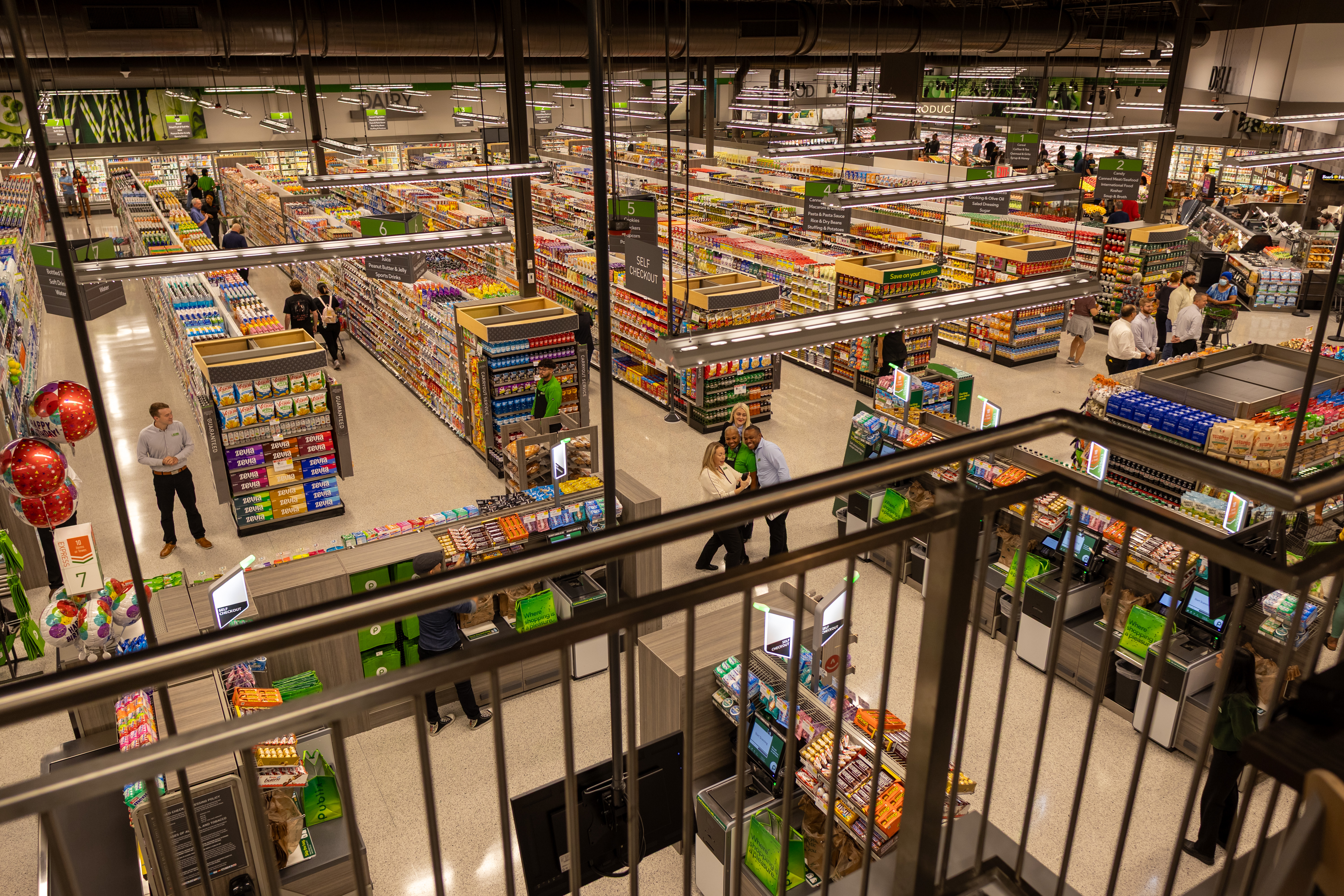
The interior of a Publix store in Orlando, Florida, as seen from the upstairs dining area

The customer service counter also provides check cashing, money orders, Western Union services, Rug Doctor rentals, and lottery tickets. Some stores also provided DVD rental services. In December 2005, Publix discontinued its photo processing service, replacing it with an online or mail-order service via the Snapfish program. The Snapfish agreement has since been terminated, and Publix no longer offers photo services.

=== Aprons ===
Aprons served as Publix's in-house recipe brand, often promoting "simple meals" for customers to make at home. Each of the more than 4,000 recipes was developed by chefs.

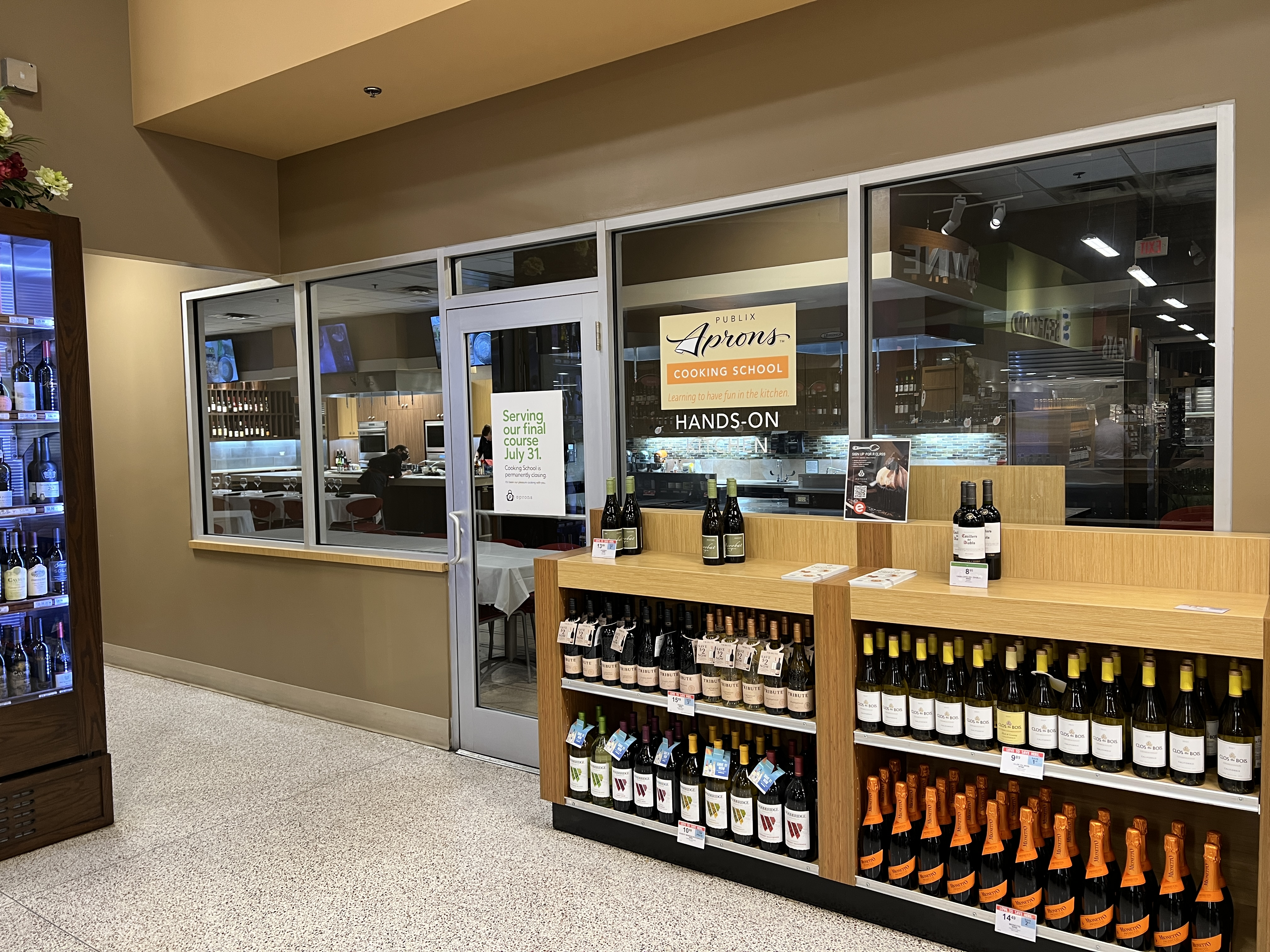
The front entrance of a now-former Apron’s Cooking School inside of a Publix store in Orlando, Florida, before its permanent closure in July 2023

In 2005, Publix introduced its Aprons make-ahead meals concept. Customers could purchase meals that they could assemble in-store or, for an extra charge, an Aprons associate would prepare and assemble the meals. These were standalone stores located in Jacksonville and Lithia, Florida. In summer 2009, Publix closed both locations citing lack of customer interest.

The brand expanded to include multiple cooking schools under the Aprons name, many of which offered catering as well. The schools offered cooking demonstrations as well as hands on cooking courses covering everything from meal prep to knife skills. By mid-2023, all Cooking School locations were permanently closed. While schools are no longer available, as of September 2024, Publix Cooking School Online videos were still accessible on YouTube.

=== Publix GreenWise Market ===
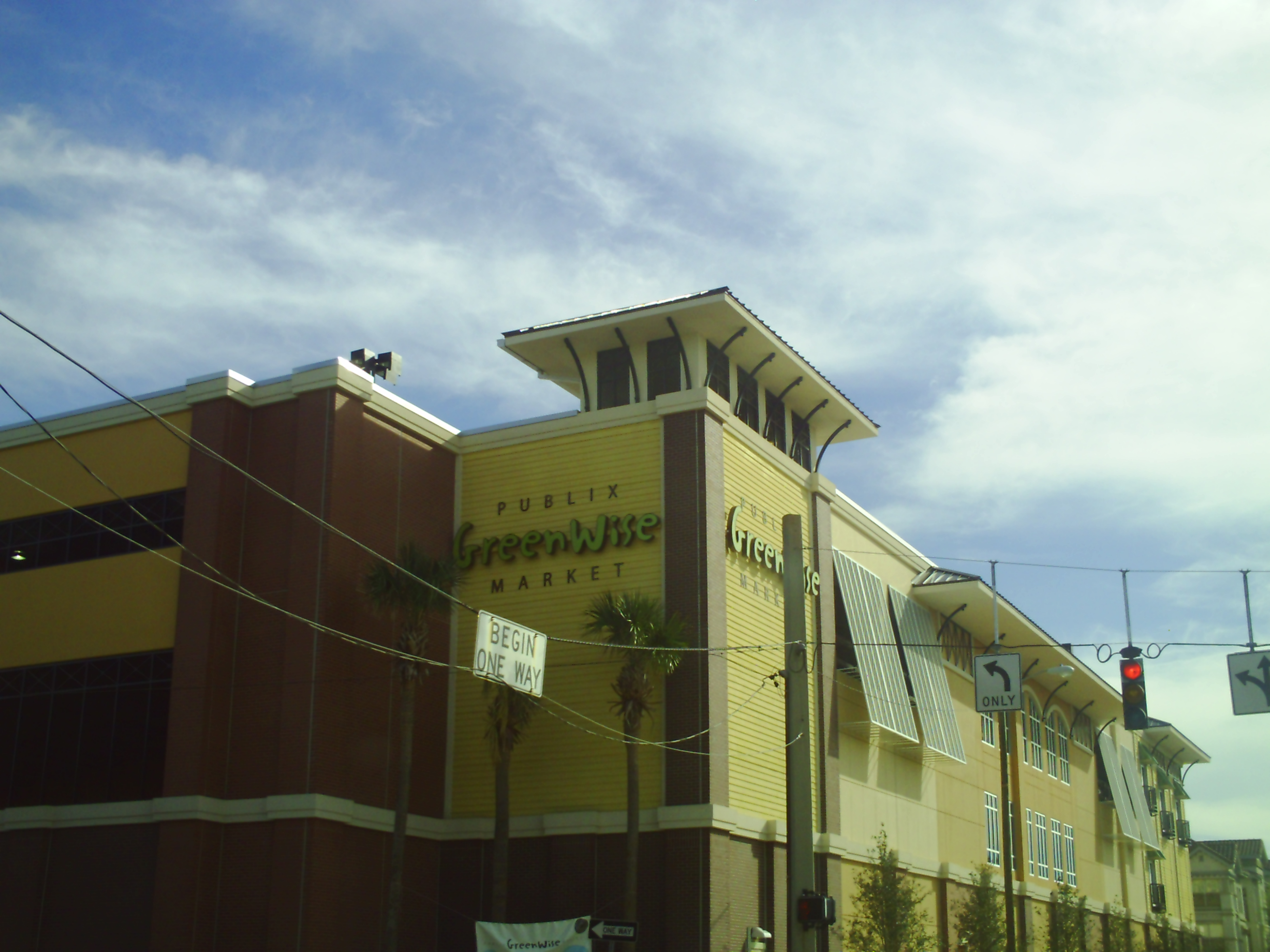
The exterior of a first-generation Publix GreenWise Market in Tampa

GreenWise Market was a retail concept the company introduced in 2007 in response to the increase in the number and profitability of health food stores such as Whole Foods Market. GreenWise Markets were created to increase awareness of nutrition; products under the GreenWise brand are free from added dyes, flavors, hormones, raised without antibiotics, or are USDA organic. These stores are similar to the Whole Foods Market chain. In addition to organic and traditional products, GreenWise Markets included salad and hot bars. The first six stores were set to be in Palm Beach Gardens, Boca Raton, Vero Beach, Tampa, Naples, and Coral Springs, Florida.

The first GreenWise Market opened on September 27, 2007, in Palm Beach Gardens. The second Publix GreenWise Market opened in Boca Raton on May 29, 2008, located in Boca Village Square. The third Publix GreenWise Market opened November 6, 2008, in Tampa's Hyde Park neighborhood.

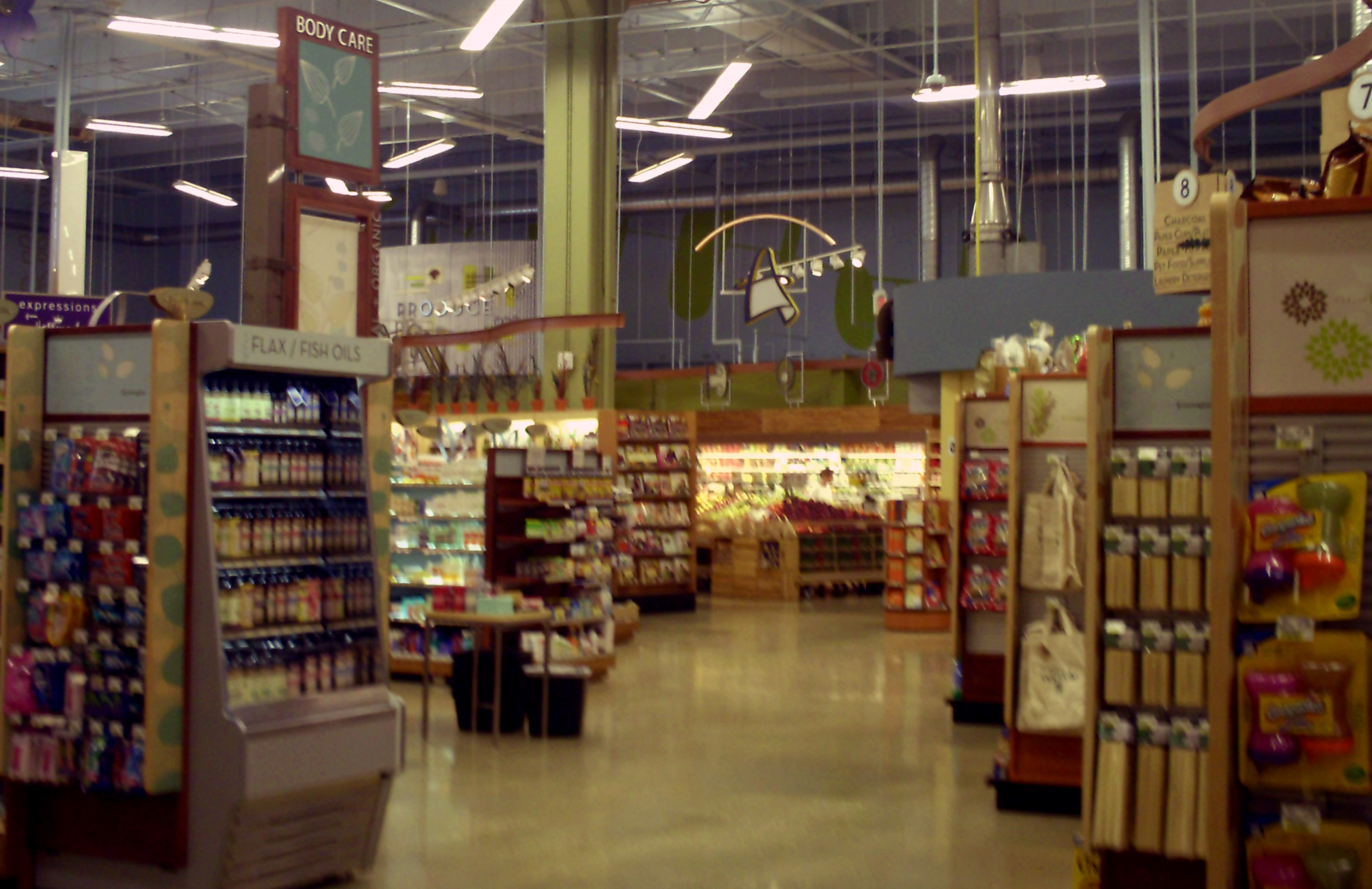
The interior of a first-generation Publix GreenWise Market

From 2008 to 2016, the company focused on a "hybrid" concept instead, integrating the GreenWise concept into traditional Publix stores. Approximately half of locations built since 2008 are considered hybrid stores.

In 2017, the company announced they would resume building standalone GreenWise locations, the first of which will be near the campus of Florida State University in Tallahassee, opening in 2018.

In May 2023, Publix announced it would be discontinuing the GreenWise Market banner, with the remaining locations converted to standard Publix stores. As of 2025, the GreenWise brand continues to be used for a private label line of organic and natural food items catering to health-conscious customers that are sold in Publix stores.

Suppliers for GreenWise include Frutas y Hortalizas del Sur S.A. (fruit).

=== Publix Sabor ===
Publix operated seven stores, branded "Publix Sabor" (sabor is Spanish for "flavor"), which cater to Latinos living in South Florida and offer products from Latin America. Located in Miami-Dade County in Greater Miami, the seven themed stores are spread between Miami and Hialeah. They have since been closed and replaced by newly built locations or merged with existing stores that are not part of the Sabor sub-brand. Outside of South Florida, there were two other Publix Sabor locations in Kissimmee and Lake Worth.

Publix Sabor locations have bilingual English-Spanish employees, open seating cafés, and a wider selection of prepared foods from the deli and bakery catering to Hispanic flavors.

Logo of Publix Pharmacy

=== Pharmacy ===
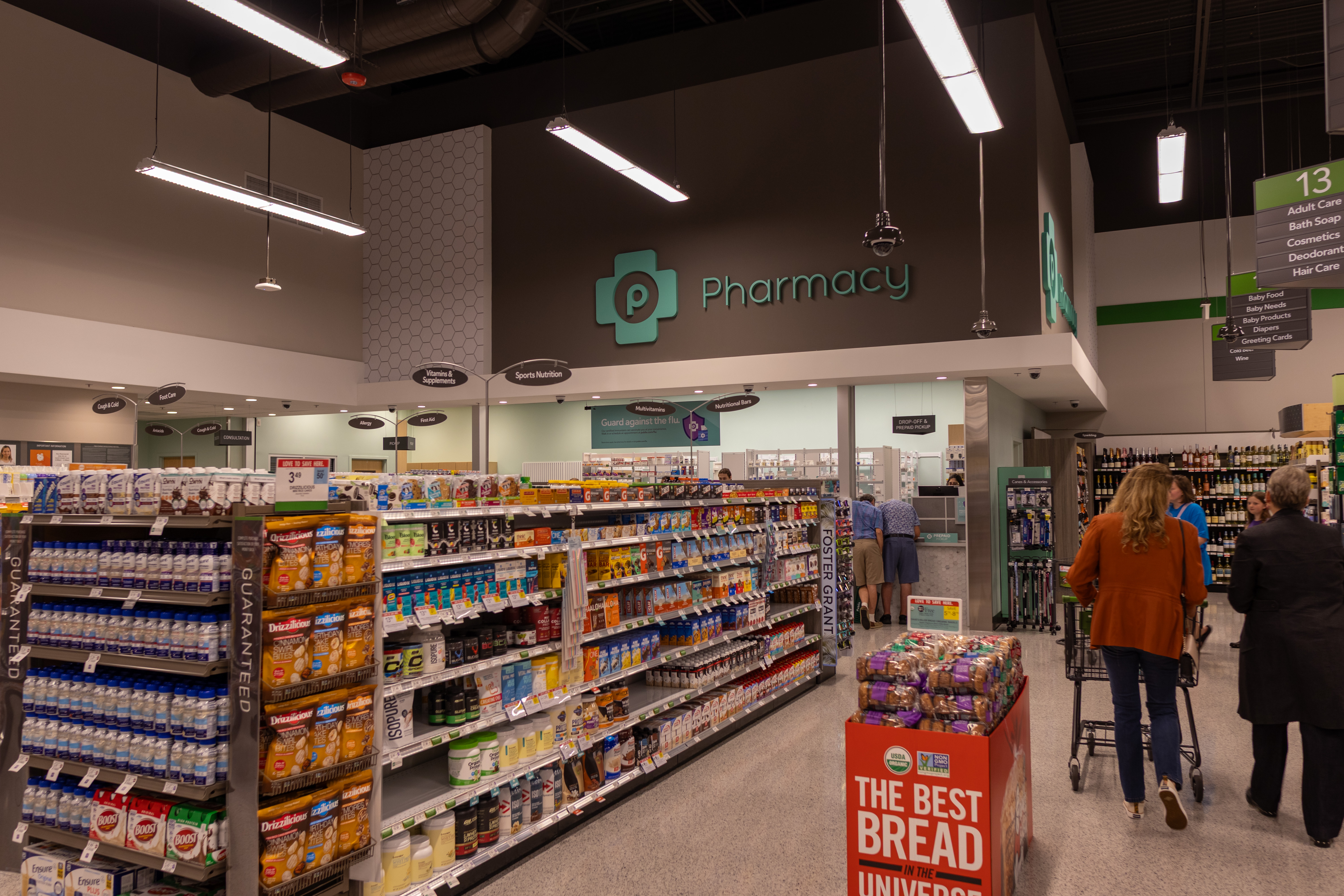
A Publix Pharmacy in Orlando, Florida

The first Publix in-store pharmacy was opened on October 30, 1986, in Altamonte Springs, Florida. By 1995, one-third of Publix stores had a pharmacy and today, approximately 90% of Publix stores include a pharmacy. Publix Pharmacies consistently ranked number one for customer satisfaction in supermarket pharmacies in several surveys conducted by independent research companies.

Publix announced in August 2007 that it would offer several types of antibiotics free to its customers. Several medical professionals expressed concerns that this could contribute to an overuse of antibiotics which leads to antibiotic resistance, a serious public health concern.

==== The Little Clinic ====
In early 2006, Publix and The Little Clinic signed an exclusive agreement to open medical clinics within Publix stores. The first clinics were opened in the Atlanta, Miami, Orlando, and Tampa markets in the first half of 2006. The Little Clinic health-care centers were staffed by nurse practitioners who can write prescriptions, provide diagnosis and treatment of common ailments and minor injuries, and offer wellness care like physicals, screenings, and vaccinations. Effective May 9, 2011, Publix closed the Little Clinics in its stores in order to focus on its core pharmacy and grocery business.

==== BayCare telehealth sites ====
Publix and BayCare Health System announced a collaboration to provide telehealth and telemedicine services at specialized pharmacies in four Tampa Bay-area counties in March 2017. Pharmacies participating in the program have private rooms for patients to speak with a board-certified physician in BayCare's network via teleconferencing, plus diagnostic tools that can be used by the patient, with or without assistance from pharmacy staff. Doctors will be able to perform basic exams and write prescriptions for minor illnesses and conditions for patients.

=== Online shopping and delivery services ===
Logo of the defunct PublixDirect online shopping and delivery service

==== PublixDirect ====
In October 2001, Publix launched its first online shopping site called PublixDirect that would deliver groceries directly to the customer. Their first distribution center was situated in Pompano Beach, Florida. Customers who lived in Broward along with parts of Miami-Dade and Palm Beach counties were the first areas to have access to their new service. Service was intended to be expanded to Orlando, Atlanta and other areas. However, the service never saw expansion past the South Florida area. Due to low demand, it was announced that PublixDirect would cease operations on August 22, 2003. The remaining deliveries were made the next day with the remaining orders being canceled or redirected to the customer's nearest Publix store.

==== Publix Curbside ====
After PublixDirect, Publix made a second attempt in 2010 at e-commerce with the introduction of Publix Curbside. Customers had the ability to browse and purchase groceries online, then drive to a participating location where an associate will have selected their items and would bring them out to the buyer's vehicle. Announced as a pilot program with locations in the Atlanta area and Tampa, the program was ended in January 2012 after its performance reportedly did not meet expectations.

The company later resurrected its curbside concept, this time using its delivery partner, Instacart, to manage the online ordering portion of the service. Currently in a trial stage, the second iteration of Publix Curbside began with two pilot locations in the greater Tampa area in September 2017, and is expected to expand to the greater Atlanta area by the end of the year.

==== Instacart ====
In July 2016, Publix announced another pilot program with Instacart to offer online shopping and delivery services in the greater Miami area. Customers in 37 ZIP codes from Hallandale Beach to South Miami are able to participate in the program. Not all products available at stores, [such as tobacco, gift cards, prescriptions] and age-restricted items, are able to be delivered by the service. Beer and wine can be delivered in Florida and North Carolina only.

As of February 2017, Instacart deliveries from Publix are available in the metro areas of Atlanta, Charlotte, Fort Lauderdale, Miami, Orlando, Raleigh, Richmond, Tampa, Jacksonville, and Nashville, as determined by ZIP code.

Later in 2017, Publix announced its intent to expand its delivery program, and expects to have the service available from more than 90 percent of stores by the end of the year.

=== Food World ===
In response to other grocery stores aggressively discounting across the Florida market, Publix opened its first Food World store in September 1970 in Orlando, Florida. The store marked the first under the Food World banner for Publix and would become the first of 22 more of the type.

In November 1977, in Lakeland, Florida, Publix opened the Lake Miriam Food World, which, at 57,000 sq. ft., was its largest store in the company and also the largest store in the Southeastern United States. The store was the company's first to feature barcode scanners.

The brand was retired in 1985 because the stores were unable to turn a profit for Publix or give workers a percentage of their store's profits.

=== Publix PIX ===
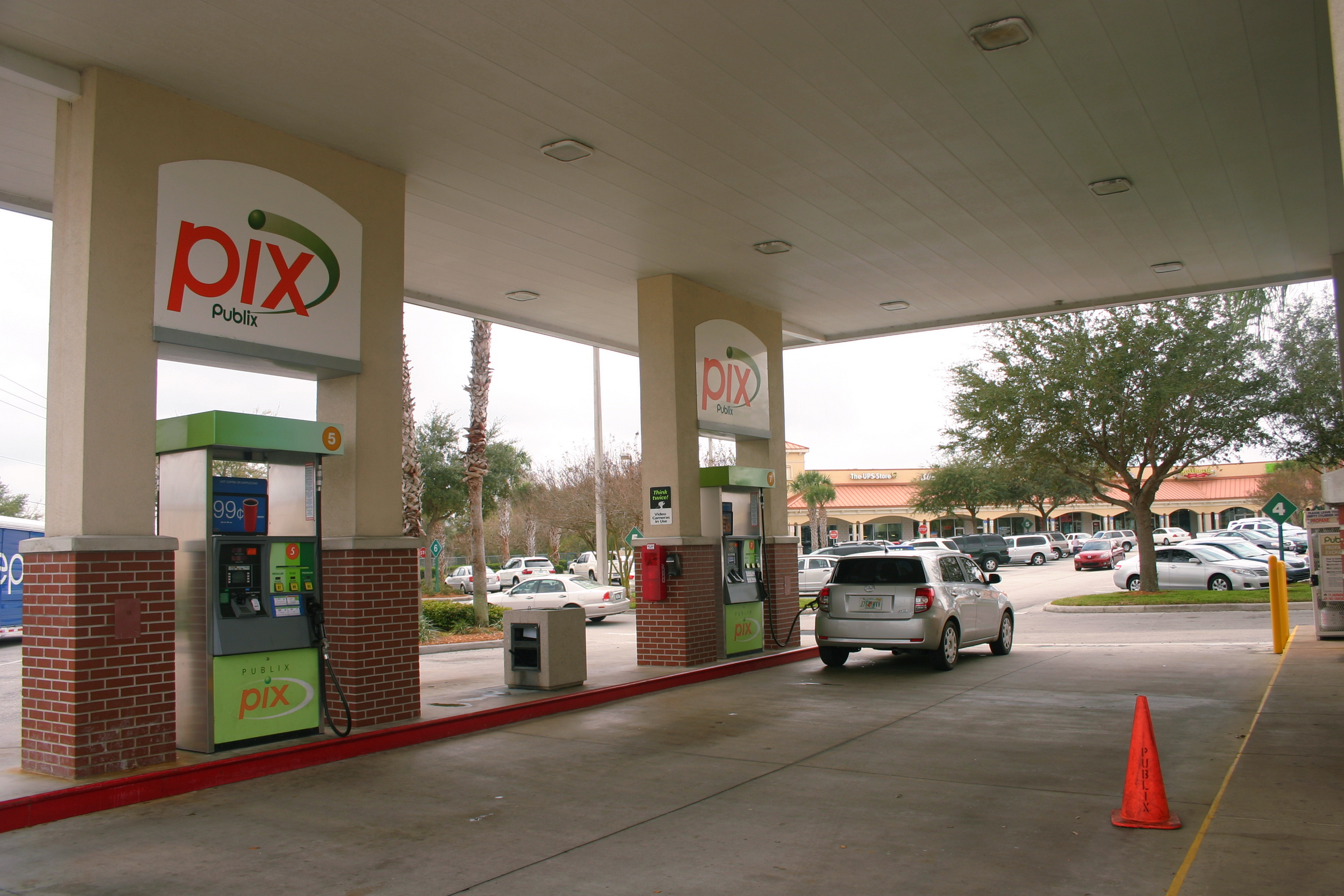
A PIX gas station in 2012

Starting in 2001, Publix operated 14 PIX (stylized in all capitals) gasoline-convenience stores in Florida, Georgia, and Tennessee. Locations were limited during the trial period of the concept. In 2014, all Florida and Georgia locations were sold to Circle K, the sole Tennessee location was sold to another entity, and the concept was discontinued. The locations were converted to other brands, as Publix retains the rights to "PIX".

=== Crispers ===
In 2002, Publix invested in the Lakeland-based restaurant chain Crispers, which concentrates on health-conscious fare. It increased its stake in 2004 before purchasing the remainder of the company in 2007. In May 2011, Publix announced it had sold the Crispers chain to Healthy Food Concepts LLC. The stores had not performed well during the downturn and in recent years Publix closed several units, leaving the chain with 36 stores when the sale was announced.

=== Publix Liquors ===
Publix tested the market response to liquor stores with three locations in the late 1980s, but closed its test sites in 1989. It re-entered the liquor sales market again in 2003 with a store in Miami and has met with success since with more than 350. The liquor store is in an area accessed via a separate entrance as required by state or local laws, modeled after many other grocery chains. The first Publix Liquors location outside Florida opened in January 2024, alongside the first Publix in Kentucky.

=== Publix POURS ===
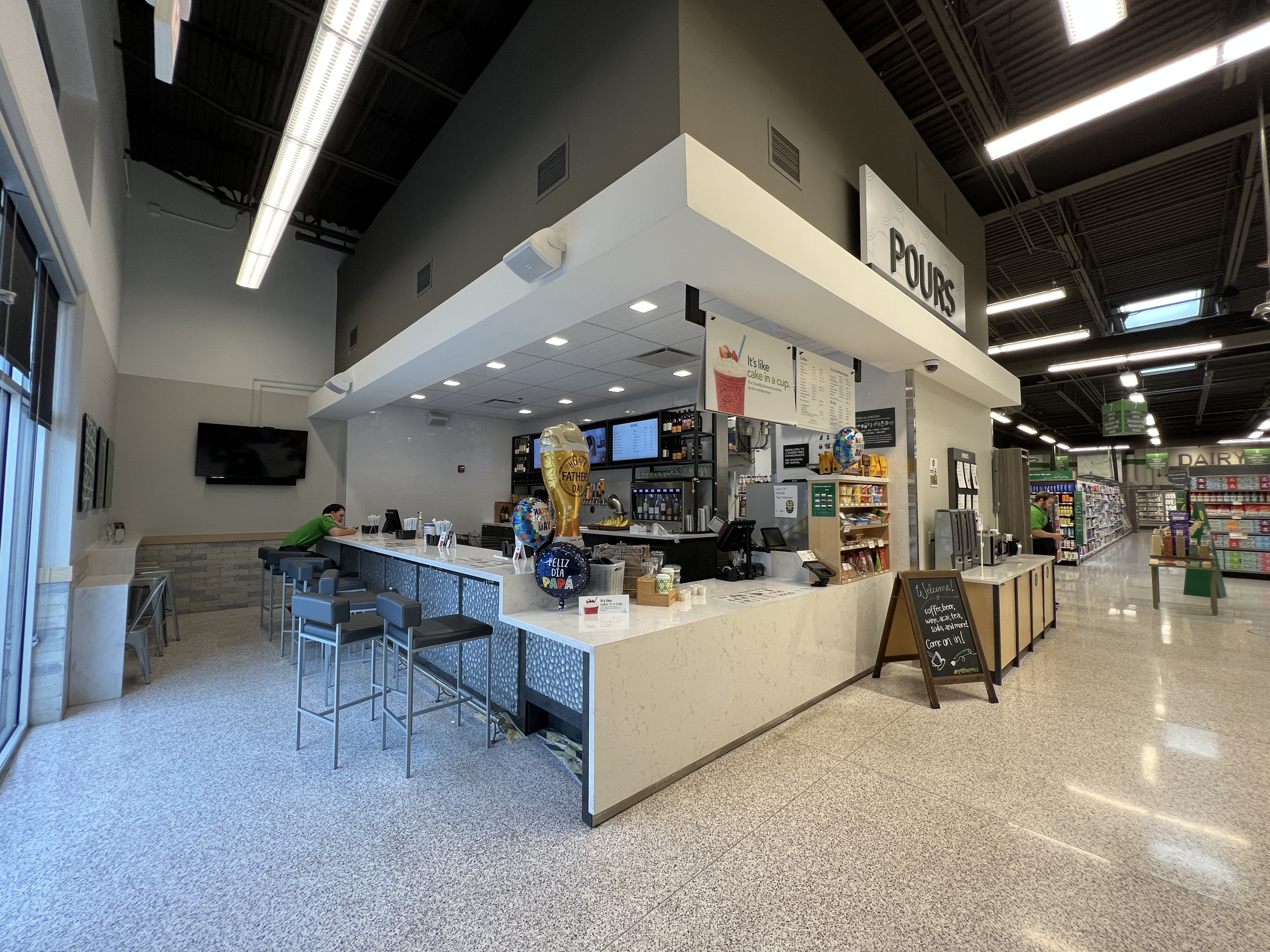
A Publix POURS bar in Orlando, Florida

Publix began a new concept at a GreenWise Market in Tallahassee in 2018. Shoppers can partake of a smoothie, coffee, beer or wine from a POURS "bar" while they shop. The concept has been expanded at select Publix locations, typically at new stores or following a store renovation. The new department also offers kombucha teas, soft drinks and acai bowls. As of January 2025, there were 16 locations in Florida offering POURS service.

=== DVD rental kiosks ===
In 2005, Publix began installing The New Release DVD rental kiosks within eight of its South Florida stores with expansion to other South Florida stores by 2006. The movie rentals were priced at $1 per day in addition to sales tax.

Following the purchase of The New Release by NCR in 2009, a partnership was formed with the NCR company and Blockbuster to replace the existing kiosks with Blockbuster Express kiosks. This replacement began the same year with additional kiosks being installed at all of the other Publix locations which was completed by 2010. The cost of the rentals remained the same.

In 2012, NCR sold its entertainment division, which includes the Blockbuster Express kiosks, to Coinstar, the then-owner of the Redbox DVD rental kiosks. Blockbuster Express machines were replaced with Redbox machines in most stores by the end of 2012.

Sometime between the second half of 2023 and early-mid 2024, the Redbox DVD rental kiosks began to be removed from Publix stores.

=== Starbucks ===
In December 2016, Publix opened its first in-store Starbucks location in the Orlando area, with five more opening throughout 2017.

Presto!
- Operating area: Southeastern United States
- Members: 2,433 (2016)
- ATMs: 1,400
- Founded: 1982
- Website: https://prestoatms.publix.com/

=== Presto! ===
Presto! is a surcharge-free automated teller machine (ATM) network owned and operated by Publix Super Markets and introduced in 1982. Every Publix Super Market has at least one ATM, and as of 2026, there are over 1,400 Presto! ATMs. These span 8 states including: Florida, Alabama, Georgia, North Carolina, South Carolina, Tennessee, Virginia, and Kentucky. This network also includes point of sale (POS) capabilities, meaning that debit, credit, electronic benefit transfer (EBT) cash, or EBT food stamp cards can be used to make purchases at any Publix store. There is no $2.95 withdrawal surcharge for Presto members and member financial institutions. A maximum of $400 can be withdrawn daily; deposits are not permitted.

=== MV Express ===
Florida MV Express is a program authorized by the Florida Department of Highway Safety and Motor Vehicles that permits vehicle registration renewal and printing of license plate decals. Private vendor Intellectual Technology, Inc. partners with the county tax collector to place self-service kiosks at select locations (including many at Publix Supermarkets). The process takes approximately two minutes but is limited to automobiles, trucks, RVs and trailers. If current insurance is not on file or name/address needs to be changed, the kiosk will not work. If the vehicle requires a new tag or has driver's license or toll suspensions, the kiosk will not work. Payment must be credit or debit card; a few accept cash.

== Working environment ==
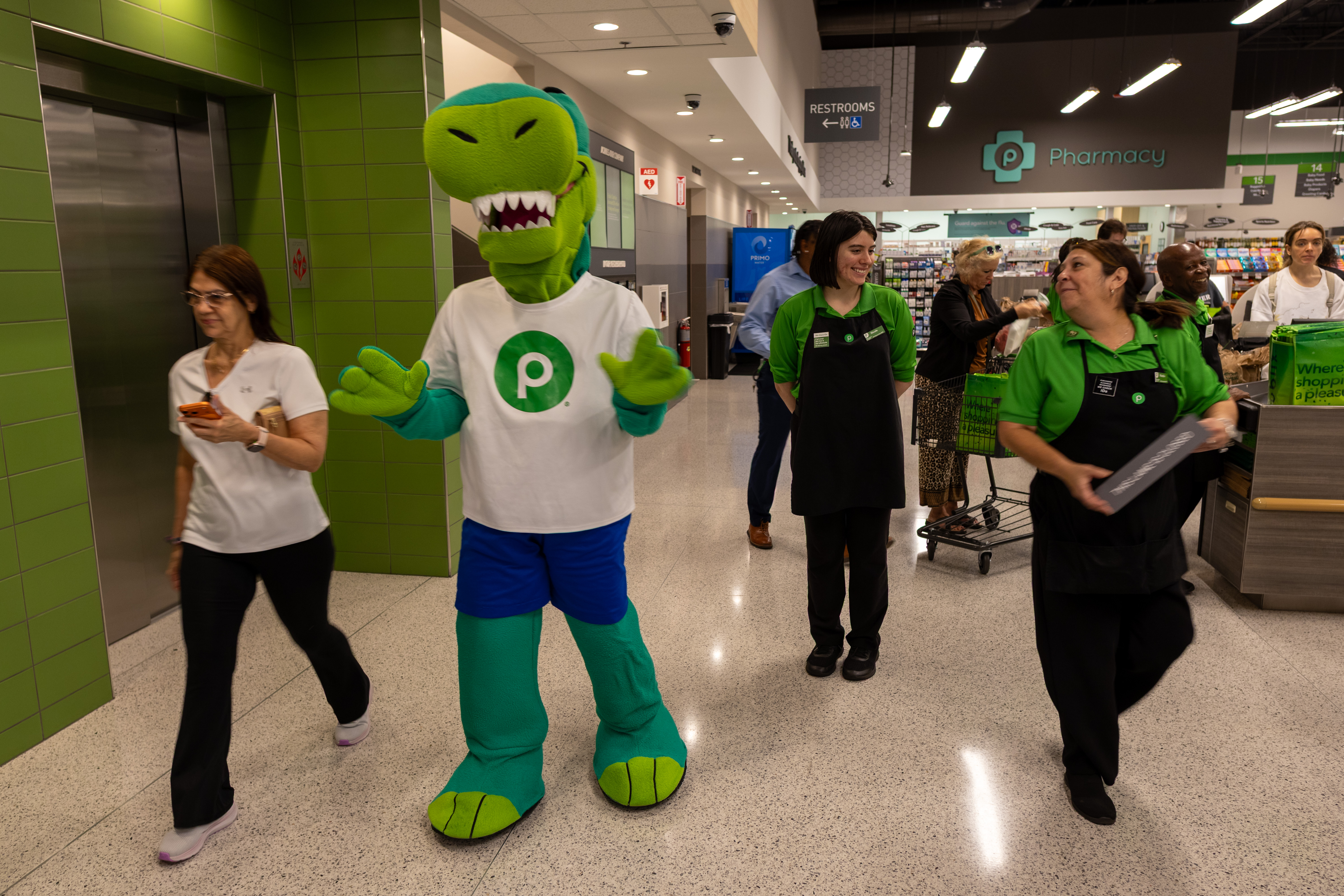
A person dressed up as Publix's mascot Plato the Publixaurus at the grand opening of a rebuilt location in the MetroWest region of Orlando, Florida, in September 2025

Publix has consistently been named one of Fortune’s 100 Best Companies to Work For. The company is one of only four (as of 2025) to have made the list every year since its inception in 1998.

The company, founded in 1930, has never had a layoff.

In 1995, Publix was sued "for sex discrimination in job assignments, promotions and allocation of hours" and settled for $81.5 million in 1997. Publix had claimed that the suit was simply an effort by the United Food and Commercial Workers to unionize the company, but the judge ruled in favor of the plaintiffs and required Publix to "correct some of its statements."

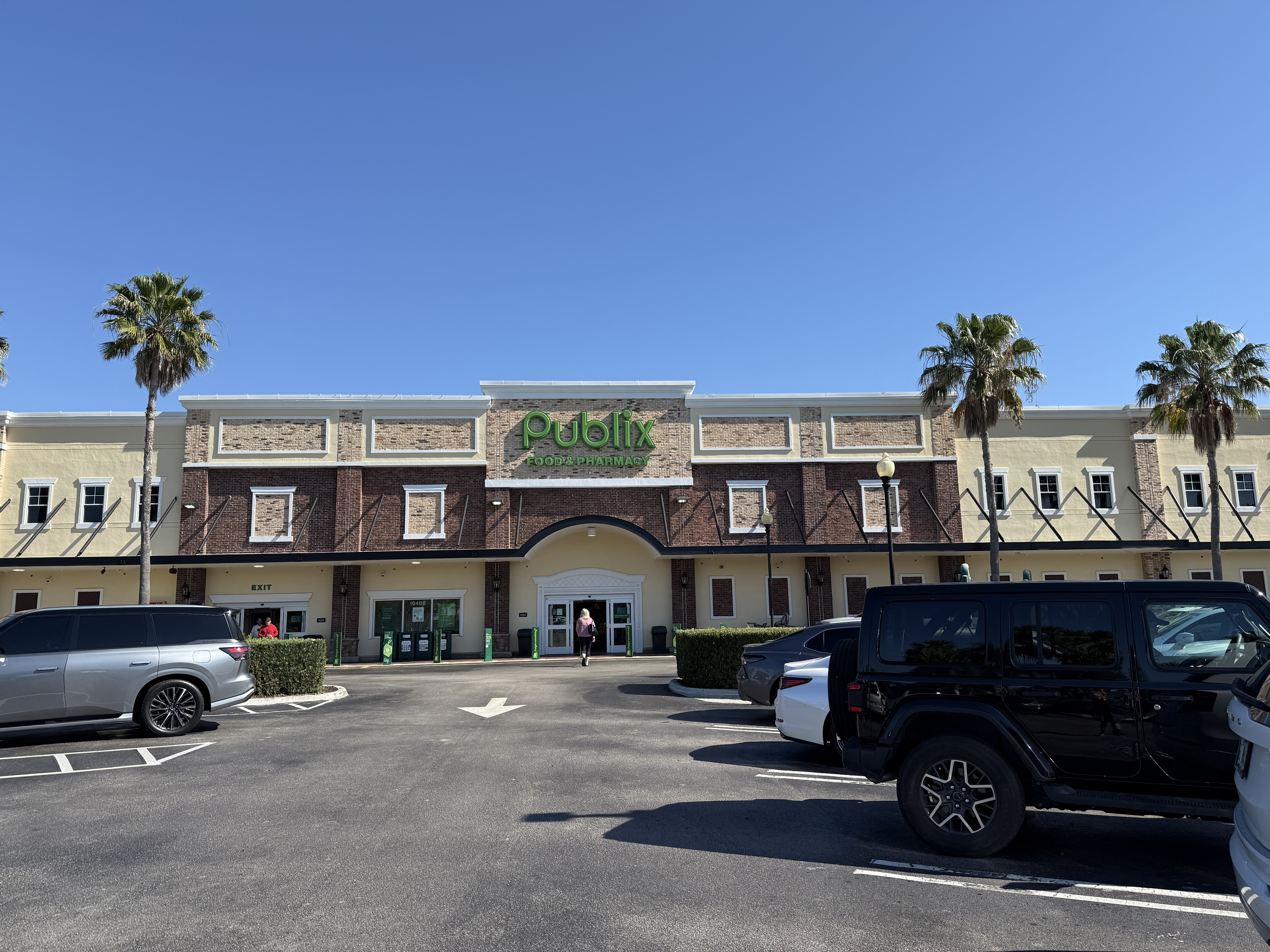
Publix store in Port St. Lucie, Florida

Publix announced that effective January 1, 2015, health coverage would be available to same-sex couples regardless of place of marriage, as long as they are legally married. In early 2018, Publix came under fire by the Human Rights Campaign and other LGBT rights organizations for refusing to cover PrEP HIV prevention drugs under its employee health plans. Shortly after the furor, Publix changed its health plans to cover PrEP.

== Political giving ==
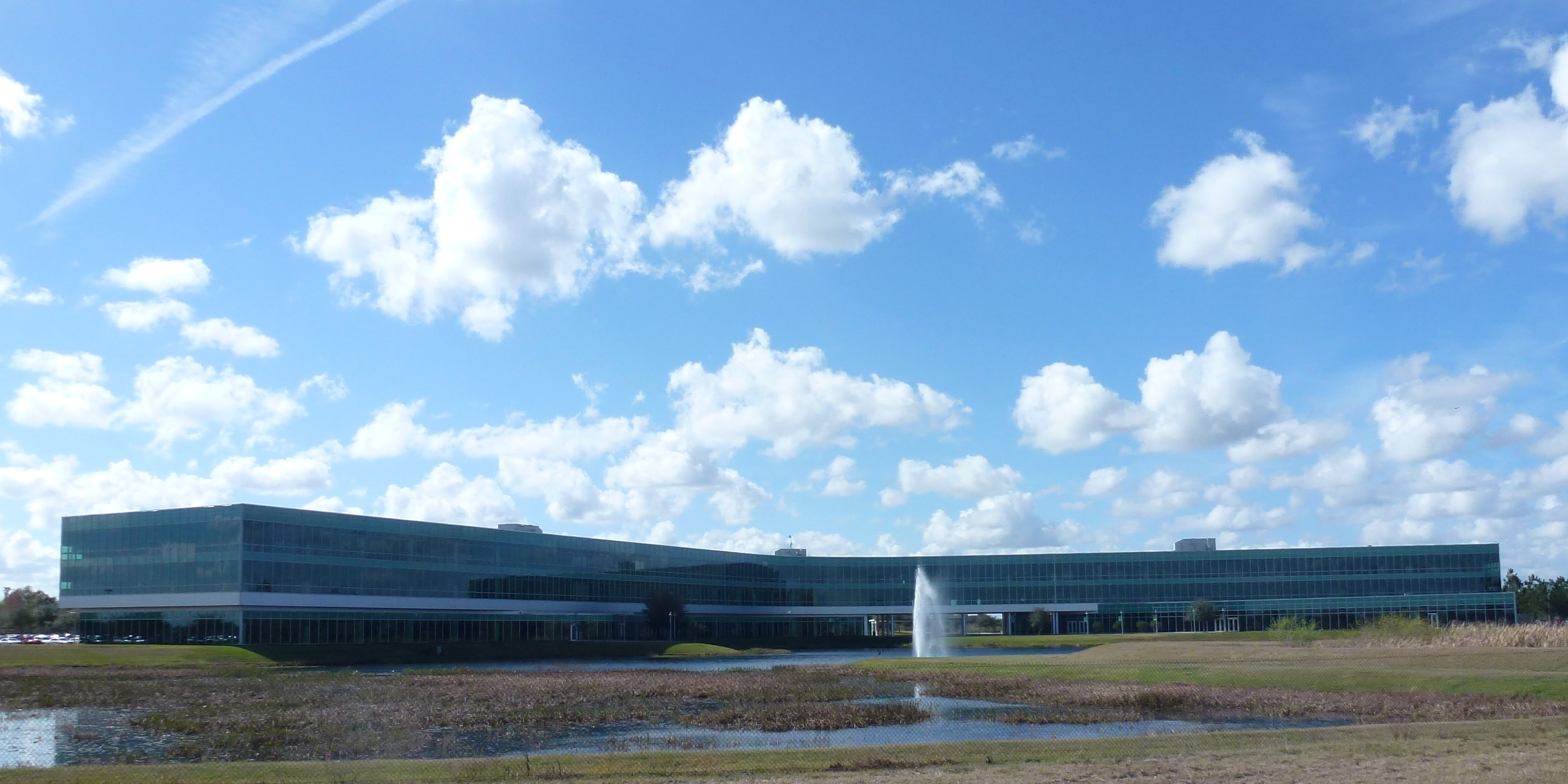
Corporate headquarters building

Publix political giving is coordinated through their Political Action Committee (PAC), which the company leverages to promote business interests.

According to the Miami New Times, Publix's recent political leanings favor conservative causes, such as opposing the legalization of medical marijuana and the regulation of polystyrene, better known by the brand name Styrofoam. Publix also contributes to the PAC supporting Ron DeSantis, who some conservatives argue is a business-friendly governor. Following the Stoneman Douglas High School shooting, contributions to other conservative leaders—specifically Adam Putnam—resulted in local protests in the Miami Area. Moments before the protests began, the company announced that it would suspend corporate-funded political contributions and reevaluate their political funding practices. Six days after halting political contributions, the Florida Retail Federation, a trade group heavily funded (>80% in 2017) by Publix, donated an additional $100,000 to Putnam's Florida Grown PAC.

In December 2020, Publix gave $100,000 to Florida governor Ron DeSantis's PAC. While some attributed to this donation Publix's partnership with the Florida government to provide COVID-19 vaccines to Florida residents, both the Governor and Publix spokeswoman Maria Brous rejected this claim as "baseless and ridiculous". Publix was able to distribute vaccines to seniors in their markets, while national providers like Walgreens and CVS focused on broader efforts.

== Locations ==
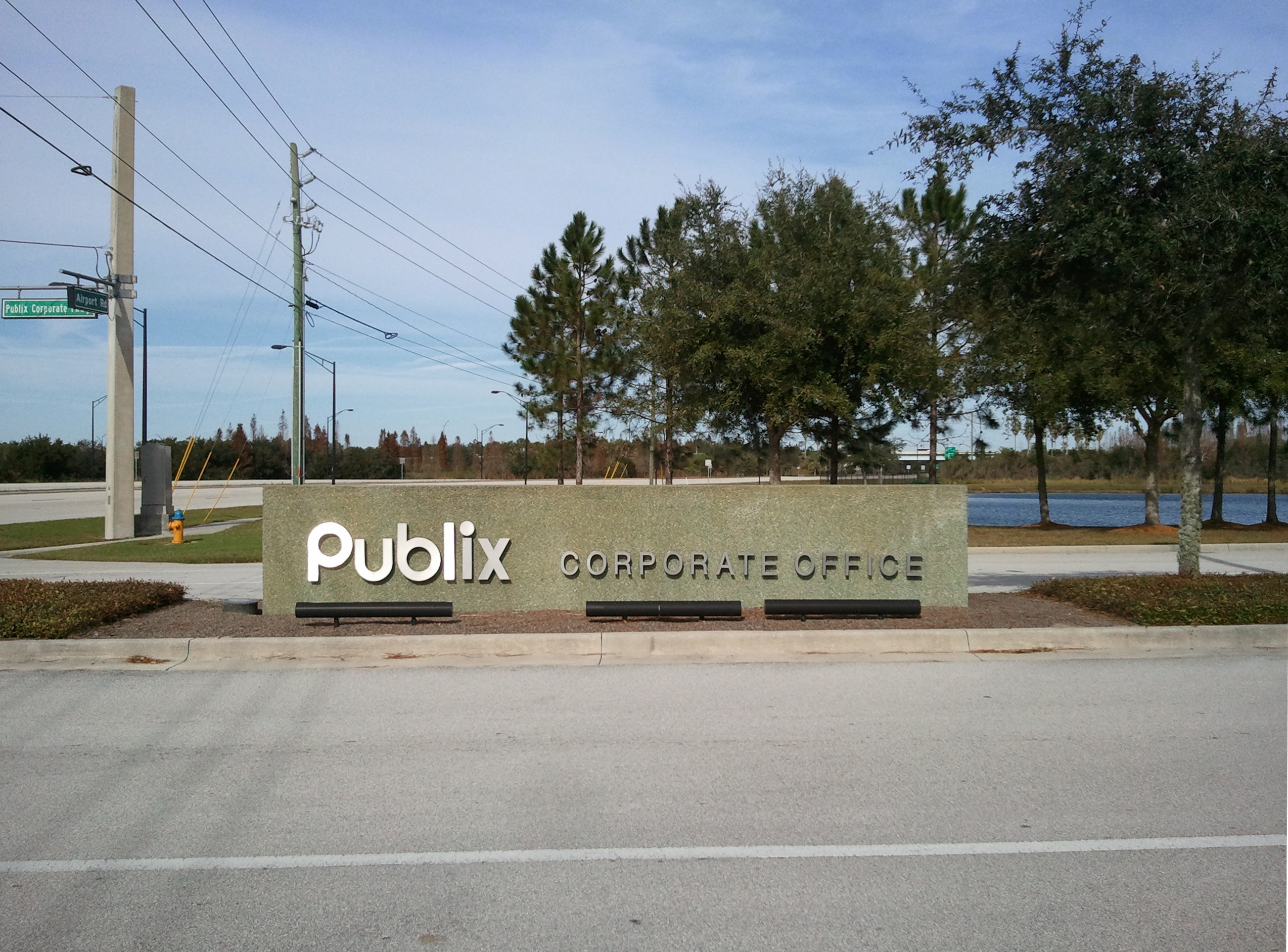
Main entrance to the corporate headquarters

Supermarkets as of October 2026^{(inclusive of other categories)}
State	Counts
Florida	899
Georgia	221
Alabama	97
South Carolina	75
Tennessee	62
North Carolina	66
Virginia	24
Kentucky	11
Total	1,455

=== Distribution centers ===
Distribution centers are located in:

- Alabama
  - McCalla – non-perishables
- Florida
  - Boynton Beach – grocery
  - Deerfield Beach – perishables
  - Jacksonville – dairy, frozen food, grocery, meat, produce
  - Lakeland – frozen food, grocery, meat, dairy, produce, general merchandise (low velocity)
  - Miami – grocery
  - Orlando – frozen food, meat, produce, grocery, pharmacy
  - Sarasota – grocery
- Georgia
  - Dacula – dairy, frozen food, grocery, meat, produce, general merchandise (low velocity)
- North Carolina
  - Greensboro

=== Manufacturing facilities ===
Manufacturing facilities are located in:

- Florida
  - Deerfield Beach – dairy, fresh foods, fresh kitchen,
  - Jacksonville – fresh foods
  - Lakeland – bakery, dairy, deli, fresh foods, fresh kitchen, printing services
  - Orlando – produce, snacks
- Georgia
  - Dacula – dairy, fresh foods
  - Atlanta – bakery

=== Support offices ===
- Florida
  - Lakeland – corporate offices, IT data center, flight center, programming and IT support, call center and customer care
  - Jacksonville – offices
  - Miami – offices
- Georgia
  - Marietta – offices
  - Alpharetta – IT data center
- North Carolina
  - Charlotte – offices

== Legal disputes ==
In 2003, Publix supported a successful bill that prevents owners from suing if their land is polluted by dry cleaning chemicals dumped on an adjacent property, if the adjacent property owners are on a state clean-up list. Publix lost a 2001 lawsuit filed by an owner whose property had been contaminated in this manner.

On October 4, 2005, Publix sued Visa and MasterCard, citing unfair business practices over their unannounced and non-negotiable increases in merchant account fees. Wal-Mart won a similar lawsuit against Visa in 2004.

In 2014, Publix was fined by the Board of Human Rights of Broward County, Florida for discrimination involved in the termination of an LGBT employee. Upon appeal, the 17th Circuit Court found that the decision by the Board of Human Rights of Broward County was "not supported by competent, substantial evidence" and quashed the order.

In 2025, witnesses at Farmers Focus, a chicken supplier for Publix, raised concerns of animal cruelty and unsanitary conditions in the poultry factories. In response, Publix dropped Farmers Focus as a supplier.

In August 2025, applied behavior analysis provider ABA Centers of America sued Publix in Florida state court, demanding compensation for partially paid and unpaid claims it submitted to Publix's employee health insurance plans. Publix countersued ABA Centers of America in federal court the same month, alleging the company submitted over $7 million in grossly inflated and fraudulent out-of-network health insurance claims. Publix filed an amended complaint in September 2025, alleging fraud totaling approximately $15 million. The lawsuit also alleged ABA Centers of America engaged in organized crime as defined by the Racketeer Influenced and Corrupt Organizations Act. In August 2026, U.S. District Judge Raag Singhal dismissed three of Publix's nine claims against the company without prejudice; the claims Publix was allowed to proceed with included civil racketeering, fraud, and unjust enrichment.

== See also ==
- Carol Jenkins Barnett
- Howard Jenkins
