= Bembry =

Bembry is a surname. Notable people with the surname include:

- Chental-Song Bembry (born 1996), American author, illustrator, and motivational speaker
- DeAndre' Bembry (born 1994), American basketball player
- Leonard Bembry (born 1947), American politician
