= Marshall Rawson =

American politician from Florida

- Official portrait, 2026

Member of the Florida House of Representatives from the 10th district
- Incumbent
- Assumed office November 3, 2026
- Preceded by: Chuck Brannan

Personal details
- Born: July 23, 1992 (age 34) Gainesville, Florida
- Party: Republican
- Spouse: Megan Elise Rawson
- Children: 5
- Education: Shorter University (attended); Jacksonville University (BS); University of Florida (JD)
- Website: House website Campaign website

Marshall Rawson (born 1992) is an American politician, lawyer, and farmer. A member of the Republican Party, Rawson represents the 10th district in the Florida House of Representatives.

== Early life and education ==
Marshall Rawson was born on July 23, 1992 in Gainesville, Florida. He competed as an NCAA Collegiate Decathlete before later graduating from Jacksonville University with a Bachelor of Science in History and the University of Florida with a JD. He serves in the Florida Guard. Rawson is a 5th generation Floridian.

== Career ==
Rawson served as a legal aide to Florida Secretary of State Cord Byrd and campaigned for Byrd during his first state house campaign. He also interned for U.S. Representative Paul Broun.

Rawson is a state board member of the Republican Liberty Caucus He is a citrus farmer and operates a company called Free State Growers.

Rawson was involved with the secessionist League of the South from 2013 to 2016. In 2017, Marshall and his wife attended the Unite the Right rally in Charlottesville.

== Florida House of Representatives ==
=== 2026 campaign ===
Rawson ran for the open 10th district after Representative Chuck Brannan was term-limited. In the Republican primary, Rawson defeated Brannan's son Chase Brannan. Chase Brannan outspent Rawson by almost $200,000 and was endorsed by Agriculture Commissioner Wilton Simpson and U.S. Representative Jimmy Patronis. Rawson was endorsed by former U.S. Representative Ted Yoho and former state Representatives Jay Fant and Anthony Sabatini.

== Personal life ==
Rawson is married to Megan Elise Rawson who is from Rome, Georgia. They have 5 children together. Rawson is a Protestant Christian.

== Electoral history ==
2026 Florida's 10th House of Representatives district Republican primary
Party	Candidate	Votes	%
Republican	Marshall Rawson	12,720	54.8
Republican	Chase Brannan	10,508	45.2
Total votes		23,228	100.0
