= Florida's 11th House of Representatives district =

American legislative district

Florida's 11th State House of Representatives district
Representative
Sam Garrison
- Demographics: 86.0% White; 8.1% Black; 4.8% Hispanic; 1.8% Asian; 0.4% Native American; 0.1% Hawaiian/Pacific Islander; 1.3% Other
- Population (2010) • Voting age: 156,023; 123,593

Florida's 11th House district elects one member of the Florida House of Representatives. The district representative seat is currently held by Sam Garrison since the 2022 United States House of Representatives elections. Following the 2020 United States redistricting cycle, Florida redrew district borders, changing its location from Northeast Jacksonville to Southeast Jacksonville, west of Fruit Cove, containing Middleburg. As of the 2010 Census, the district's population is 177,922.

This district features a large military presence, serving as a bedroom community for the various naval bases in Jacksonville, as well as Naval Submarine Base Kings Bay in nearby St. Marys, Georgia. This district contains Naval Station Mayport, located in Mayport, and the Blount Island Command, located on Blount Island.

There was a vacancy between November 22, 1988 and January 18, 1989 as the incumbent, Gene Hodges, resigned after being appointed to the Florida Parole Commission. Army veteran Allen Boyd won a special election to fill the seat.

There was a vacancy between September 1, 1998 and November 4, 1998 as the incumbent, Randy Mackey, resigned after being convicted of federal tax evasion. The seat remained vacant until the general election a few months later.

There was a vacancy between May 16, 2022 and November 8, 2022 as the incumbent, Cord Byrd, resigned after being chosen by Governor Ron DeSantis to become the 31st secretary of state of Florida.

Donald L. Tucker served as speaker of the Florida House of Representatives from 1974 to 1978.

== Representatives from 1967 to the present ==
Representatives by party affiliation
Party	Representatives
Democratic	8
Republican	4

#	Name	Term of service	Residence	Political party
1	Wayne Mixson	1967–1972	Graceville	Democratic
2	Donald L. Tucker	1972–1978	Tallahassee	Democratic
3	Don C. Price	1978–1982	Tallahassee	Democratic
4	Gene Hodges	1982–1988	Cedar Key	Democratic
	Vacant	November 22, 1988 – January 17, 1989		
5	Allen Boyd	1989–1992	Monticello	Democratic
6	Randy Mackey	1992–1998	Lake City	Democratic
	Vacant	1998 – November 3, 1998		
7	Dwight Stansel	1998–2006	Wellborn	Democratic
8	Debbie Boyd	2006–2010	Newberry	Democratic
9	Elizabeth W. Porter	2010–2012	Lake City	Republican
10	Janet Adkins	2012–2016	Fernandina Beach	Republican
11	Cord Byrd	2016–2022	Neptune Beach	Republican
	Vacant	May 16, 2022 – November 7, 2022		
12	Sam Garrison	2022–present	Fleming Island	Republican

== See also ==
- Florida's 4th Senate district
- Florida's 6th Senate district
- Florida's 4th congressional district
