= Richard Pettigrew =

Richard Pettigrew may refer to:

- Richard F. Pettigrew (1848–1926), American lawyer, surveyor and U.S. Senator from South Dakota
- Richard A. Pettigrew (born 1930), American politician in the state of Florida
