= Thomas Urquhart (Florida politician) =

American politician

Thomas Urquhart was a delegate to Florida's 1868 constitutional convention and a state legislator the same year representing Hamilton County, Florida and Suwannee County, Florida. He served in the Florida House of Representatives.

He was a signatory of Florida's 1868 constitution. He chaired the Committee of Enrolled Bills in the Florida House. He was white. He was recorded on the voter rolls for Wellborn, Florida.

== See also ==
- African American officeholders from the end of the Civil War until before 1900
