= Florida's 10th House of Representatives district =

American legislative district

Florida's 10th State House of Representatives district
Representative
Marshall Rawson; R–Hampton
- Demographics: 78.6% White; 16.7% Black; 5.8% Hispanic; 0.7% Asian; 0.5% Native American; 0.1% Hawaiian/Pacific Islander; 1.7% Other
- Population (2010) • Voting age: 156,423; 120,635

Florida's 10th House district elects one member of the Florida House of Representatives. The district is represented by Chuck Brannan. This district is located in North Central Florida, and encompasses part of the inland First Coast, as well as small parts of the Gainesville metropolitan area and the Jacksonville metropolitan area. The district covers all of Baker County, Columbia County, Hamilton County, Suwannee County, and part of northern Alachua County. The largest city in the district is Lake City. As of the 2010 census, the district's population is 156,423.

This district contains Florida Gateway College, located in Lake City. The district also contains a small military presence at Lake City Gateway Airport.

== Representatives from 1967 to the present ==
Representatives by party affiliation
Party	Representatives
Democratic	10
Republican	3

#	Name	Term of service	Residence	Political party
1	W. M. Inman	1967–1968	Quincy	Democratic
2	Robert Davidson Woodward	1968–1972	Quincy	Democratic
3	Pat Thomas	1972–1974	Quincy	Democratic
4	James Harold Thompson	1974–1982	Quincy	Democratic
5	Herb Morgan	1982–1986	Tallahassee	Democratic
6	Hurley Rudd	1986–1992	Tallahassee	Democratic
7	Allen Boyd	1992–1996	Monticello	Democratic
8	Janegale Boyd	1996–2000	Tallahassee	Democratic
9	Will Kendrick	2000–2008	Carrabelle	Democratic (Note: Kendrick was elected as a Democrat, but switched to Republican in 2006.)
10	Leonard Bembry	2008–2012	Greenville	Democratic
11	Elizabeth W. Porter	2012–2018	Lake City	Republican
12	Chuck Brannan	2018–2026	Macclenny	Republican
13	Marshall Rawson	2026–present	Hampton	Republican

== See also ==
- Florida's 3rd Senate district
- Florida's 5th Senate district
- Florida's 8th Senate district
- Florida's 2nd congressional district
- Florida's 3rd congressional district
- Florida's 5th congressional district
