= Bumbry =

Bumbry is a surname. Notable people with the surname include:

- Al Bumbry (born 1947), American baseball player
- Grace Bumbry (1937−2023), American opera singer

== See also ==
- Bembry
