= Dwight Stansel =

American politician

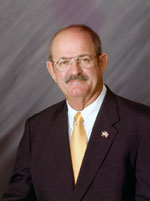
- Dwight Stansel

Member of the Florida House of Representatives from the 11th district
- In office November 3, 1998 – November 7, 2006
- Preceded by: Randy Mackey
- Succeeded by: Debbie Boyd

Personal details
- Born: July 6, 1947 (age 79) Lake City, FL
- Party: Democratic
- Spouse: Glenda Avery
- Children: son, Erwin, and daughter, Carmon
- Education: Suwannee High School
- Profession: Farmer

Dwight Stansel (born July 6, 1947) is a Florida politician of the Democratic Party and a former member of the Florida House of Representatives from District 11.

== Early life and education ==
Dwight Stansel was born in Lake City, Columbia County, Florida to Bobby E. and Maudell J. Stansel, both of whom came from farming families. He grew up on the family farm in Wellborn, and graduated from Suwannee High School in 1964. Stansel was raised Southern Baptist, and is a member of Mt. Beulah Baptist Church, in Wellborn, Florida.

== Career ==
=== Early career, and career outside politics ===
After high school, Stansel joined the Florida National Guard, where he served for 10 years. Prior to purchasing the family farm and taking over the operations in 1986, Dwight was an airport manager at the Suwannee County airport. His father had already decided that the farm would be divided up amongst the four children and they could do as they pleased with their share of the land. Dwight's siblings, however, really had no interest in farming, and conceded their share of the land, allowing Dwight to take majority ownership, keep the farm going, and ensure that the land would remain with the family. Thus it became the Dwight Stansel Farm and Nursery. After taking over the operation of the farm that was started in the 1880s in Wellborn, by his grandparents, John Vincent Stansel, and Kate Geneva (Stevens) Stansel, Dwight grew the farm into a very profitable business growing pine trees, tobacco, and peanuts, and raising chickens. Since 1986, the farm has more than doubled in size, and now covers several hundred acres of land. Today, Dwight is still general manager, mostly overseeing the tree farm. He stopped growing tobacco, son Erwin manages the peanut farm, and Dwight's wife, Glenda manages the poultry farm.

=== House of Representatives (1998–2006) ===
Dwight Stansel was elected to the Florida House of Representatives, District 11 seat on November 3, 1998.

When he took office in 1998, his District included the following counties: Columbia, Hamilton, Lafayette, Madison, Suwannee and parts of Dixie and Gilchrist. In 2003, the area his district covered was then changed to include the following counties: Gilchrist, Lafayette, Suwannee, and parts of Alachua, Columbia, and Dixie. Today, the district still represents the same general area, excluding Dixie County.

While in Legislature, Stansel became Vice Chairman of the State Agriculture Committee. He also served on the Agriculture and Environment Appropriations Committee, the Select Committee to Protect Private Property Rights, the State Infrastructure Council, State Resources Council, and the Transportation Committee.

While in office, Stansel sponsored seven bills. All but two of them died. The University of Florida Men's Basketball Team Bill (HR 9089) that Stansel sponsored passed unanimously, and state of Florida honored the 2006 UF Men's Basketball Team for winning the championship. He co-sponsored several other bills which includes the Affordable Housing Bill (HB 1363), and the Land Acquisition Management Bill (HB 1347). Being a farmer, and avid hunter, Stansel sponsored many land ownership and property rights bills as well as gun laws, and hunting regulations bills.

He retired from the House on November 7, 2006 due to term limits.

Stansel is also known for cracking the whip during the Florida House's annual "Boot Day", and explaining how it was used much more commonly in the early days of Florida, for cattle drives- which is where the term "cracker", or "Florida Cracker" came from.
