= Will Kendrick =

American politician (born 1960)

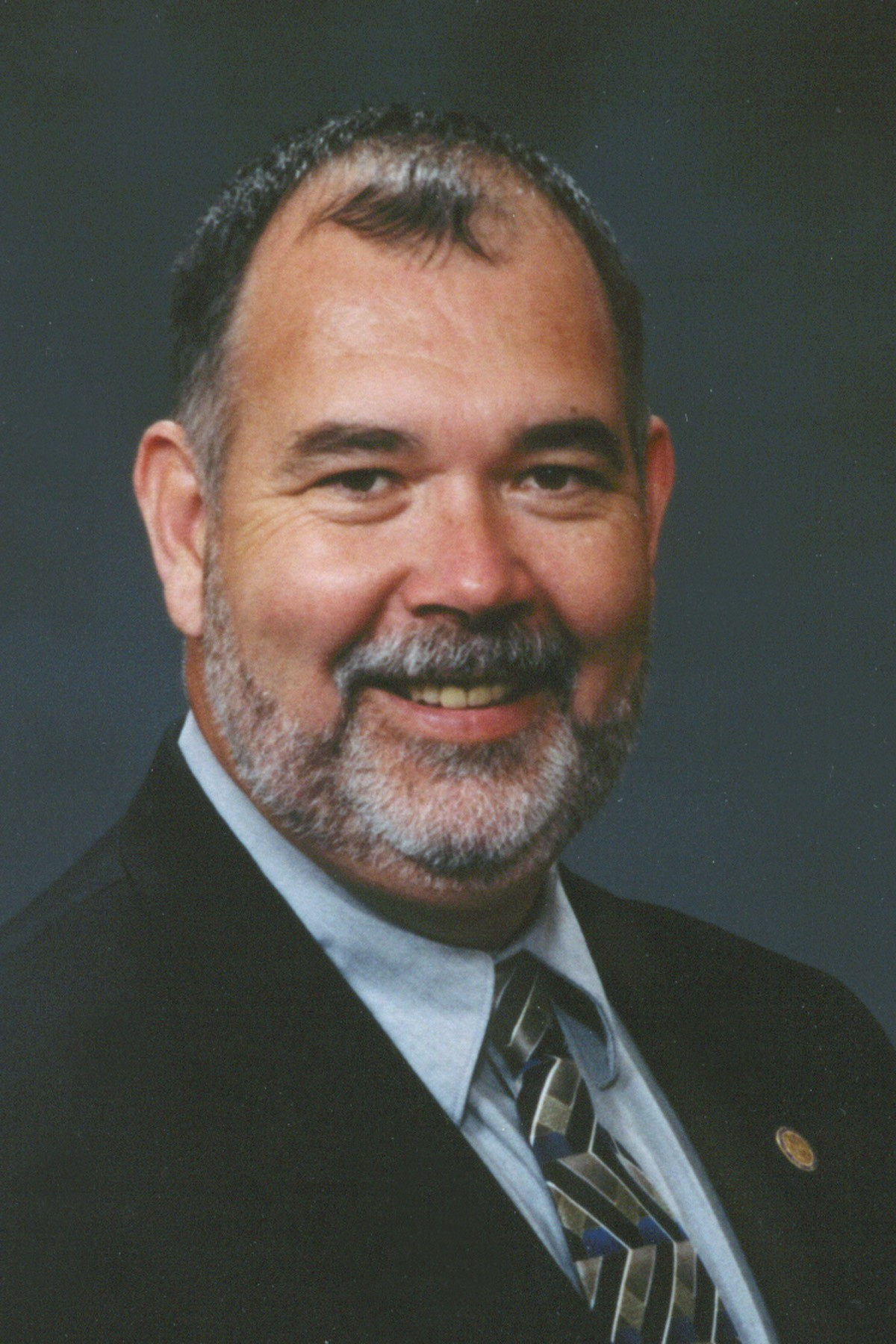

Member of the Florida House of Representatives from the 10th district
- In office November 7, 2000 – November 4, 2008
- Preceded by: Janegale Boyd
- Succeeded by: Leonard Bembry

Personal details
- Born: April 10, 1960 (age 66) Apalachicola, Florida, U.S.
- Party: Republican
- Other political affiliations: Democratic (before 2006)
- Spouse: Constance Faith "Connie" Messer (div. 2020)
- Children: Sterling, Jonathan, Collins
- Education: Florida School of Banking
- Occupation: Marketing

Will S. Kendrick is a Republican politician who served as a member of the Florida House of Representatives from 2000 to 2008, representing the 10th District.

== History ==
Kendrick was born in Carrabelle and served on the Franklin County Commission from 1980 to 1984. He then served on the county school board from 1986 to 2000, including a seven-year stint as chairman from 1992 to 1999. Kendrick was elected to his final term on the Board in 1998, beating challenger David Hinton 71–29%.

== Florida House of Representatives ==
In 2000, when incumbent State Representative Janegale Boyd opted to run for the State Senate rather than seek re-election, Kendrick ran to succeed her in the 10th District, which stretched from Apalachicola to the Tallahassee suburbs in the Panhandle down to outer Gainesville and Ocala in North Central Florida. In the Democratic primary, he faced attorney Joyce Dove, businessman Johnny "Hank" Hankerson, developer George Johnston, attorney Joseph Lander, Wakulla County Commissioner Murray McLaughlin, and former State Representative Carl Ogden. In the initial primary, no candidate received a majority—Kendrick won 23% the vote, Hankerson won 21%, Lander won 18%, McLaughlin won 15%, Dove won 11%, Ogden won 9%, and Johnston won 4%. Accordingly, a runoff was held between Kendrick and Hankerson. Despite the closeness of the initial primary, however, Kendrick defeated Hankerson in a rout, receiving 61% of the vote to Hankerson's 39%. In the general election, Kendrick faced Carol "Sunny" Phillips, state comptroller Bob Milligan's chief lobbyist and the Republican nominee. Despite the district's conservative lean, Kendrick easily defeated Phillips, winning 61–39%.

In 2002, Kendrick faced no opposition in the Democratic primary and was only opposed by Libertarian candidate John McElligott in the general election. Kendrick won in a landslide, beating McElligott 85–15%. In 2004 and 2006, Kendrick was unopposed for re-election.

After winning re-election in 2006, Kendrick announced that he was switching to the Republican Party. He criticized the Democratic Party for taking him for granted, and argued that he would be better able to win state funding for projects in his district as a Republican in the Republican-dominated house. Following his party switch, he was named Chairman of the House Committeeon on Conservation and State Lands. As Chairman, he successfully pushed to increase funding for the Florida Fish and Wildlife Conservation Commission by increasing fees, protected state funding for wildlife preservation, established a program to preserve seagrass by creating seagrass mitigation banks, and backed an effort to restore the Crooked River Light Station's beam. Kendrick also sponsored legislation to provide breakfast to middle school students and successfully pushed to expand the Franklin Correctional Institution in Carrabelle to add a work camp.

== 2008 campaign for Franklin County Superintendent of Schools ==
On January 25, 2007, Kendrick announced that he would run for Franklin County Superintendent as a Republican. However, he later filed to run for Superintendent without party affiliation, arguing that it would better enable him to win the votes of Democrats and Republicans. He faced off in the general election against School Board member Denise Butler, the Republican nominee, and Nina Marks, the dean of Franklin County High School and the Democratic nominee. After a closely fought race, Kendrick lost to Marks, winning 30% of the vote to Marks's 39%, and narrowly edging out Butler, who placed third with 29% of the vote.

== After politics ==
After leaving the Florida House in 2008, Kendrick began working as a legislative liaison for the Florida Department of Corrections. In 2015, when Franklin County Supervisor of Elections Ida Cooper Elliott resigned, Kendrick applied to replace her. However, Governor Rick Scott ended up appointing County Commissioner Pinki Jackel instead.
