= J. Hyatt Brown =

American businessman and politician (born 1937)

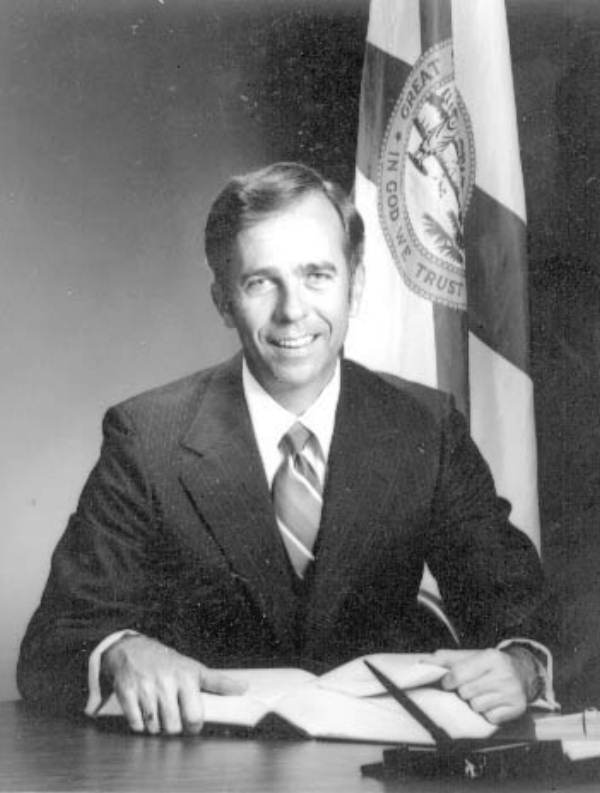

Speaker of the Florida House of Representatives
- In office 1978–1980
- Preceded by: Donald L. Tucker
- Succeeded by: Ralph Haben

Member of the Florida House of Representatives from the 31st district
- In office November 7, 1972 – November 4, 1980
- Preceded by: William C. Andrews
- Succeeded by: T. K. Wetherell

Personal details
- Born: July 12, 1937 (age 89) Orlando, Florida, U.S.
- Party: Democratic
- Children: 3
- Education: University of Florida
- Occupation: insurance agent

J. Hyatt Brown (born July 12, 1937) is an American billionaire businessman and politician in the state of Florida.

Brown was born in Orlando and grew up in Daytona Beach. He attended the University of Florida and works in the insurance industry.

Brown sat in the Florida House of Representatives for the 31st district, as a Democrat, from 1972 to 1980. From 1978 to 1980, he was Speaker of the Florida House of Representatives.

In 2009, Brown retired as CEO of his insurance agency, Brown & Brown. In March 2018, he was worth an estimated $1.1 billion. In 2012, Brown and his wife Cici donated $13 million to the Museum of Arts and Sciences in Daytona Beach for the construction of the Brown Museum, which opened in early 2015. In 2018, Brown and his wife donated $18 million to Stetson University and pledged $15 million to improve Daytona Beach's Riverfront Park.
