= W. M. Inman =

American politician (1895–1977)

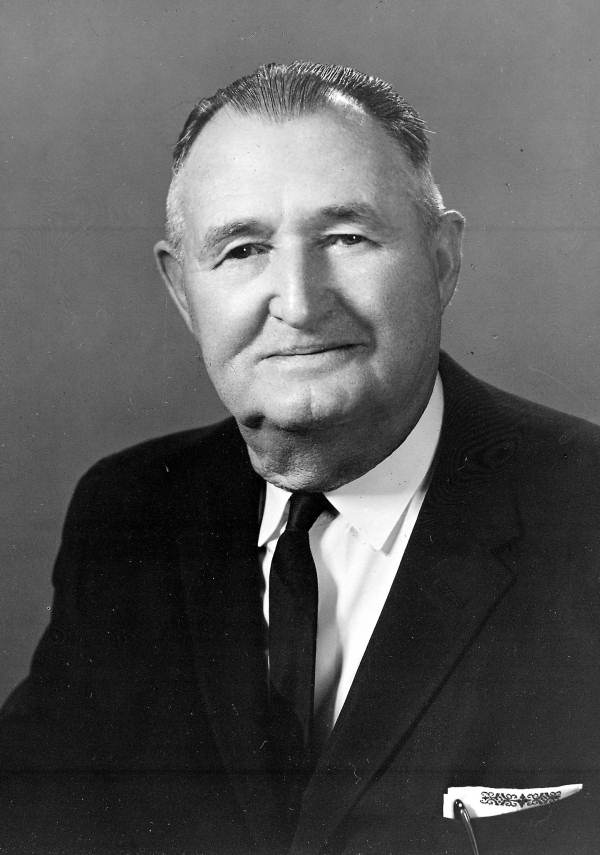
- Inman in 1951

Member of the Florida House of Representatives from Gadsden County
- In office 1951–1966

Member of the Florida House of Representatives from Gadsden–Liberty
- In office 1966–1967

Member of the Florida House of Representatives from the 10th district
- In office 1967–1968
- Preceded by: District established
- Succeeded by: Robert Davidson Woodward

Personal details
- Born: September 12, 1895 Greensboro, Florida, U.S.
- Died: September 17, 1977 (aged 82)
- Party: Democratic

W. M. Inman (September 12, 1895 – September 17, 1977), also known as Bill Inman, was an American politician. He served as a Democratic member for the 10th district of the Florida House of Representatives.

== Life and career ==
Inman was born in Greensboro, Florida. He was a farmer.

In 1951, Inman was elected to the Florida House of Representatives. In 1967, he was elected as the first representative for the newly established 10th district. He served until 1968, when he was succeeded by Robert Davidson Woodward.

Inman died on September 17, 1977, at the age of 82.
