= Janet Adkins =

American politician (born 1965)

Janet H. Adkins
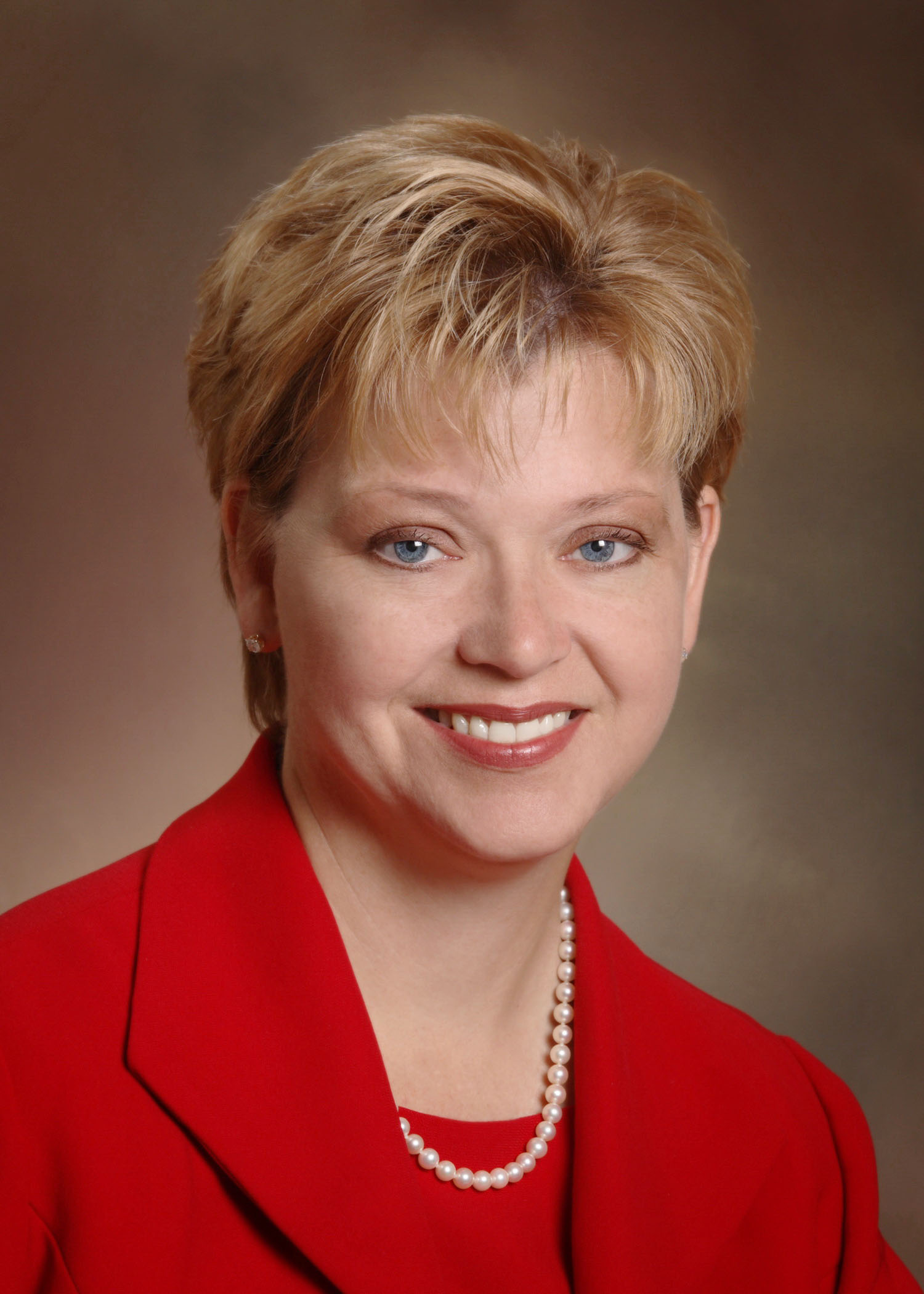

Nassau County Supervisor of Elections
- Incumbent
- Assumed office January 2021
- Preceded by: Vicki Cannon

Member of the Florida House of Representatives
- In office November 18, 2008 – November 22, 2016
- Preceded by: Aaron Bean
- Succeeded by: Cord Byrd
- Constituency: 12th district (2008–2012); 11th district (2012–2016)

Personal details
- Born: October 9, 1965 (age 61) Jacksonville, Florida, U.S.
- Party: Republican
- Spouse: Doug
- Children: 2
- Education: Florida State College at Jacksonville (A.A.); University of North Florida (B.S.) (M.B.A.)
- Profession: Information technology

Janet H. Adkins (born October 9, 1965) is an American businesswoman and politician serving as the Nassau County supervisor of elections since 2021. A member of the Republican Party, she previously served in the Florida House of Representatives from 2008 to 2012 and as a member of the Nassau County School Board from 1998 to 2008. After long-serving Supervisor of Elections Vicki Cannon retired, Adkins was elected in 2020 and reelected in 2024.

== History ==
Adkins was born in Jacksonville, and attended Trinity Christian Academy, where she graduated as valedictorian in 1983. Following this, she attended Florida State College at Jacksonville, where she received an associate degree in 1985, and the University of North Florida, receiving a bachelor degree in computer information science in 1987 and a Master of Business Administration in 1990. Adkins then worked for Information Systems of Florida as an information technology specialist, eventually becoming a client partner at the firm. She was elected to the Nassau County School Board in 1998, and served there until she ran for the legislature in 2008.

== Florida House of Representatives ==
When incumbent State Representative Aaron Bean was unable to seek re-election in 2008, Adkins ran to succeed him in District 12, which included Baker County, Nassau County, Union County, and parts of Bradford County, Clay County, and Duval County. She won the Republican primary against Bobby Hart comfortably with 59% of the vote, and was unopposed in the general election. Adkins was re-elected entirely uncontested in 2010, as well.

Following the reconfiguration of districts in 2012, Adkins was moved into the 11th District, which contained her home in Nassau County, and gave up its reach into the Florida Panhandle in exchange for a large section of Duval County, stretching south to Jacksonville Beach. In the Republican primary, she was opposed by attorney Cord Byrd. Adkins criticized her opponent for being a "personal injury attorney who sues small businesses," and disagreed with him over state funding for the St. Johns River Ferry, which she supported. She received the endorsement of former Governor Jeb Bush, who praised her as "a state representative who has made improving education for Florida's students a priority." The contest between the two was not close, and Adkins won her party's renomination with 65% of the vote. In the general election, she faced Democratic nominee Dave Smith and a write-in candidate. Owing to the district's strong partisan lean, Adkins overwhelmingly won re-election over Smith, winning 72% of the vote.

In 2016, Adkins co-sponsored HB 1411, which increased state regulation on abortion and abortion-related services. It passed in a majority-Republican state legislature and was signed into law by Governor Rick Scott on March 25, 2016. On June 2, 2016, Planned Parenthood filed a complaint in the US District Court for the Northern District of Florida against the State of Florida, and alleged that the law was unconstitutional.
