= Hurley Rudd =

American politician (1927–2006)

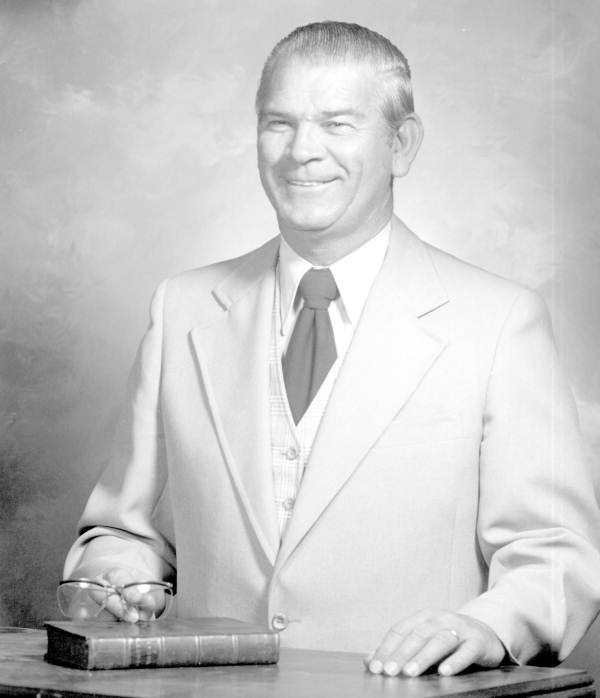
- Rudd in 1978

Member of the Florida House of Representatives
- In office November 4, 1986 – November 8, 1994
- Preceded by: Herb Morgan
- Succeeded by: Marjorie Turnbull
- Constituency: 10th district (1986–1992); 9th district (1992–1994)

Personal details
- Born: September 11, 1927
- Died: August 10, 2006 (aged 78)
- Party: Democratic

Hurley W. Rudd (September 11, 1927 – August 10, 2006) was an American politician. He served as a Democratic member for the 9th district and 10th district of the Florida House of Representatives.

== Career ==
Rudd served in the United States Army during the Korean War.

In 1986, Rudd was elected to represent the 10th district of the Florida House of Representatives, succeeding Herb Morgan. He served until 1992, when he was succeeded by Allen Boyd. In the same year, he was elected to represent the 9th district, succeeding Al Lawson. He served until 1994, when he was succeeded by Marjorie Turnbull.

Rudd died in August 2006, at the age of 78.
