= Marjorie Turnbull =

American politician (born 1940)

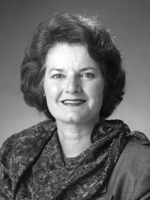

Member of the Florida House of Representatives from the 9th district
- In office November 8, 1994 – November 7, 2000
- Preceded by: Hurley Rudd
- Succeeded by: Loranne Ausley

Personal details
- Born: July 4, 1940 (age 86) Madison, Wisconsin
- Party: Democratic
- Spouse: Augustus Bacon Turnbull (m. 1965; died 1991)
- Education: University of Florida (B.A.); University of Georgia (M.A.)
- Profession: Politician

Marjorie Reitz Turnbull (born July 4, 1940) is an American politician who served as State Representative from Florida's 9th district from November 8, 1994 until November 7, 2000. She previously served as a Leon County Commissioner from 1988 until 1994.

Turnbull currently serves on the Board of Directors of Prime Meridian Bank.

== Early life and education ==
Marjorie Reitz was born in Madison, Wisconsin on July 4, 1940, to Frances H. (née Millikan) and J. Wayne Reitz, who later served as President of the University of Florida. They moved to Florida in 1941.

Turnbull attended Agnes Scott College from 1958 until 1960, when she transferred to the University of Florida, where she received her bachelor's degree in 1962. She later received her master's degree from the University of Georgia in 1968.

== Career ==
Turnbull then began working in the Florida House of Representatives as an assistant, eventually rising to the position of Deputy Assistant Secretary for Health Planning for the State of Florida in 1982. Turnbull was elected as a Leon County Commissioner in 1988 and served until 1994. She was chair of the Leon County Commission from 1991 to 1992.

In 1994, Turnbull was elected to the Florida House of Representatives for the 9th district, representing the northern suburbs of Tallahassee. Turnbull was the first woman to be elected to the Florida House of Representatives from Leon County. While serving as a State Representative, Turnbull also served as Executive Director of Tallahassee Community College. She served in this position from 1995 until her retirement in 2006.

Since her retirement, Turnbull has served in various executive positions, including as President of the Challenger Center Board. She was also a member of the Board of Trustees for Florida A&M University, and was on the boards of The Gadsden Arts Center, and the United Way. Turnbull is currently President of the Economic Club of Florida, a member of the boards of Tallahassee Memorial Hospital, the Tallahassee Symphony Orchestra, the Big Bend Hospice Foundation, and the Children's Home Society. Turnbull is also a Founding Director of Tallahassee's Prime Meridian Bank.

== Personal life ==
Marjorie married Augustus Bacon Turnbull (b. 1940), Assistant Vice President of Academic Affairs for Florida State University, in 1965. They were married until his death from lung cancer in 1991.
