= Carroll Webb =

American politician

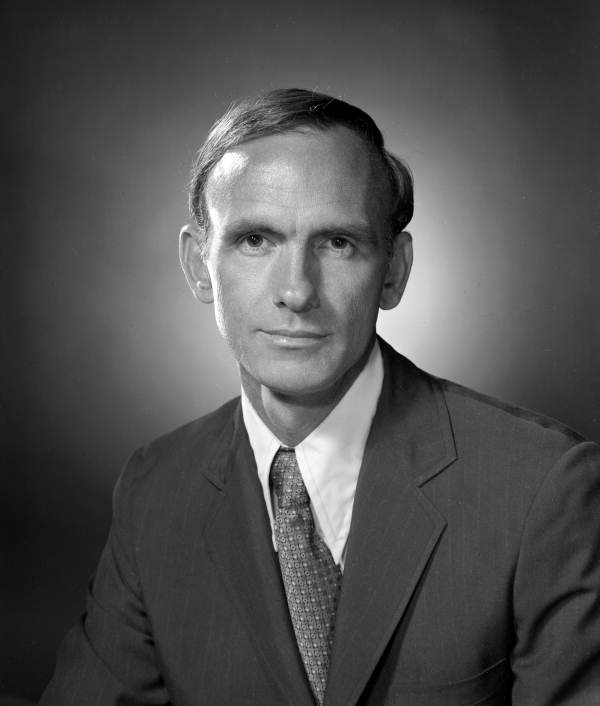
- Webb in 1972

Member of the Florida House of Representatives from the 12th district
- In office 1972–1974
- Preceded by: Miley Miers
- Succeeded by: Herb Morgan

Personal details
- Born: 1933 (age 92–93) Sparta, Georgia, U.S.
- Party: Democratic
- Education: University of Florida; Stetson University

Carroll Webb (born 1933) is an American politician. He served as a Democratic member for the 12th district of the Florida House of Representatives.

== Life and career ==
Webb was born in Sparta, Georgia. He attended the University of Florida and Stetson University.

Webb was an attorney.

In 1972, Webb was elected to represent the 12th district of the Florida House of Representatives, succeeding Miley Miers. He served until 1974, when he was succeeded by Herb Morgan.
