= Randy Mackey =

American politician

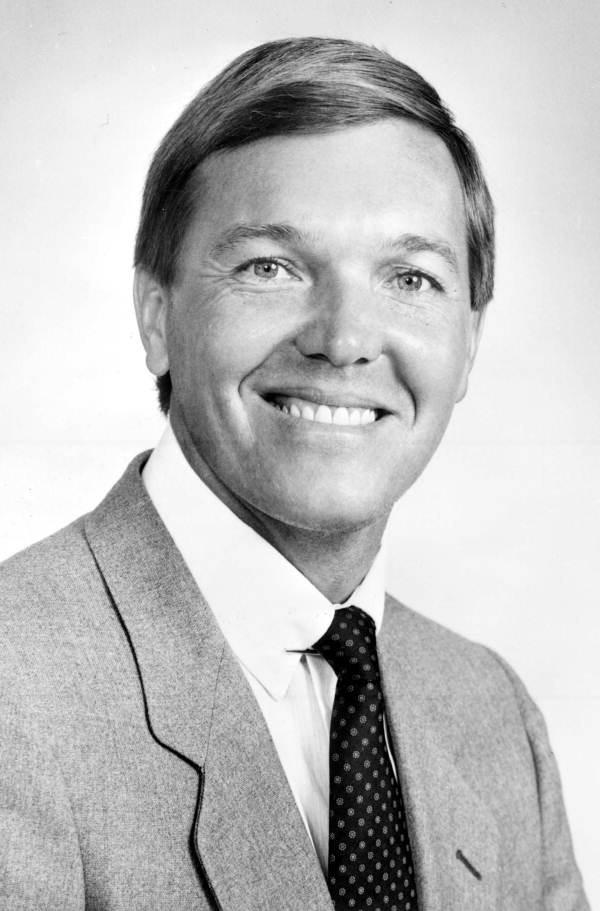
- Mackey in 1992

Member of the Florida House of Representatives from the 12th district
- In office 1986–1992
- Preceded by: Allen Boyd
- Succeeded by: Dwight Stansel

Member of the Florida House of Representatives from the 11th district
- In office 1992 – September 1, 1998
- Preceded by: Wayne Hollingsworth
- Succeeded by: George Crady

Personal details
- Party: Democratic

Randy Mackey is an American politician. He served as a Democratic member for the 11th and 12th district of the Florida House of Representatives.
