= Lester Fonville =

American basketball player

Personal information
- Born: February 15, 1963 (age 63) Mound Bayou, Mississippi, U.S.
- Listed height: 7 ft 2 in (2.18 m)
- Listed weight: 245 lb (111 kg)

Career information
- High school: John F. Kennedy (Mound Bayou, Mississippi)
- College: Florida Gateway (1982–1983); Jackson State (1984–1987)
- NBA draft: 1987: 2nd round, 29th overall pick
- Drafted by: Portland Trail Blazers
- Position: Center

Career history
- 1987–1989: Mississippi Jets / Wichita Falls Texans
- 1990: Norwood Flames

Career highlights
- First-team All-SWAC (1987); Second-team All-SWAC (1986)
- Stats at Basketball Reference

Lester Fonville (born February 15, 1963) is an American former professional basketball player. He played at John F. Kennedy High School in his hometown of Mound Bayou, Mississippi, before he spent one year playing collegiately at Lake City Community College. After sitting out one season, he played college basketball with the Jackson State Tigers for three years and emerged as a potential NBA draft candidate. In his senior season, his 3.9 blocks per game were ranked third best in NCAA Division I. Fonville was selected to the second-team All-Southwestern Athletic Conference (SWAC) in 1986 and the first-team in 1987.

Fonville was drafted by the Portland Trail Blazers as the 29th overall pick of the 1987 NBA draft. Although he never played for the Trail Blazers, he signed with the team in April 1988, was on their 1988 playoff roster, and worked out regularly with their Lithuanian prospect, Arvydas Sabonis, prior to the 1988–89 NBA season.

Fonville played two seasons in the Continental Basketball Association (CBA) from 1987 to 1989. He played for the Mississippi Jets for the 1987–88 season, then stayed with the team the next season as they relocated and became the Wichita Falls Texans. He averaged 3.7 points and 5.3 rebounds over 34 games. He spent the 1990 season with the Norwood Flames of the South East Australian Basketball League (SEABL).

== Career statistics ==
Legend
GP	Games played	GS	Games started	MPG	Minutes per game
FG%	Field goal percentage	3P%	3-point field goal percentage	FT%	Free throw percentage
RPG	Rebounds per game	APG	Assists per game	SPG	Steals per game
BPG	Blocks per game	PPG	Points per game	**Bold**	Career high

=== College ===
Year	Team	GP	GS	MPG	FG%	3P%	FT%	RPG	APG	SPG	BPG	PPG
1984–85	Jackson State	25	–	17.4	**.467**	–	.489	5.7	.5	.2	2.2	7.1
1985–86	Jackson State	**29**	–	24.0	.447	–	.529	7.8	**1.4**	.5	3.2	7.3
1986–87	Jackson State	**29**	**26**	**30.3**	.454	–	**.660**	**10.3**	1.0	**.7**	**3.9**	**13.7**
Career		83	26	24.2	.455	–	.599	8.0	1.0	.5	3.1	9.5
