= Donald L. Tucker =

American politician (1935–2019)

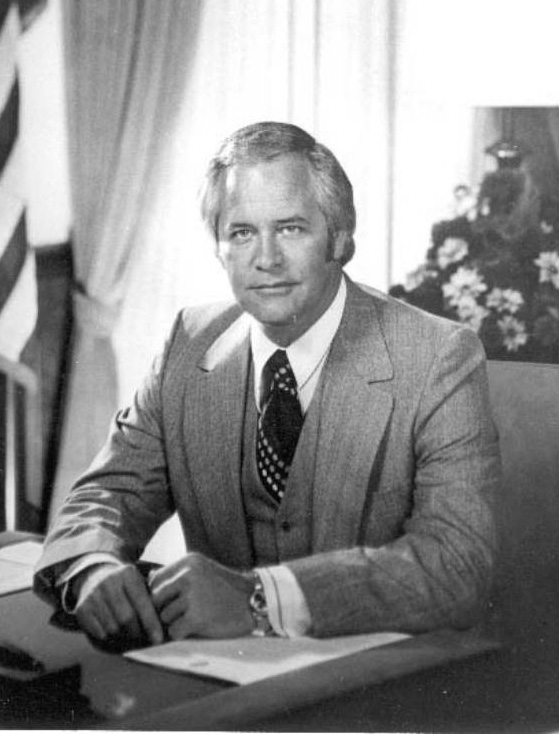

Speaker of the Florida House of Representatives
- In office November 19, 1974 – November 21, 1978
- Preceded by: T. Terrell Sessums
- Succeeded by: J. Hyatt Brown

Member of the Florida House of Representatives from the 11th district
- In office November 7, 1972 – November 7, 1978
- Preceded by: Wayne Mixson
- Succeeded by: Don C. Price

Member of the Florida House of Representatives from the 13th district
- In office 1967 – November 7, 1972
- Preceded by: Seat established
- Succeeded by: Leon McDonald

Personal details
- Born: July 23, 1935 Tallahassee, Florida, U.S.
- Died: September 24, 2019 (aged 84)
- Profession: Diplomat and Attorney

Donald L. Tucker (July 23, 1935 – September 24, 2019) was an American politician who served as the Speaker of the Florida House of Representatives and Special Ambassador for the United States to the Dominican Republic.

In 1952, Tucker attended Florida American Legion Boys State, serving as that year's program Governor. Tucker earned his Juris Doctor degree from the University of Florida in 1962.

He served as Speaker of the Florida House of Representatives from 1974 to 1978, the 49th of 58 consecutive Democrats to do so.

The Tallahassee-Leon County Civic Center, home of the Florida State University Men's and Women's basketball teams, as well as other local teams, was renamed in honor of Tucker in 1977 and is now known as the Donald L. Tucker Center.

Tucker died of cancer in 2019 at the age of 84.

Florida House of Representatives
Preceded by Seat established	Member of the Florida House of Representatives from the 13th district 1967–1972	Succeeded by Leon McDonald
Preceded by Wayne Mixson	Member of the Florida House of Representatives from the 11th district 1972–1978	Succeeded by Don C. Price
Political offices
Preceded by T. Terrell Sessums	Speaker of the Florida House of Representatives; 1974–1978	Succeeded by J. Hyatt Brown
