= Janegale Boyd =

American politician

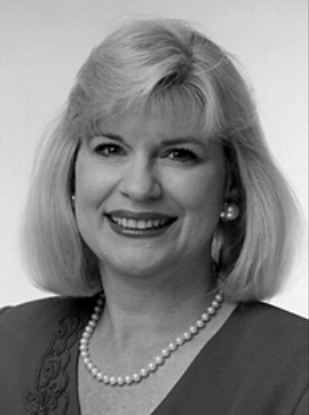

Member of the Florida House of Representatives from the 10th district
- In office November 5, 1996 – November 7, 2000
- Preceded by: Allen Boyd
- Succeeded by: Will Kendrick

Personal details
- Born: November 30, 1952 (age 73)
- Party: Democratic
- Education: Tallahassee Community College (A.S.N.)
- Occupation: Nurse

Janegale M. Boyd is a Democratic politician who served as a member of the Florida House of Representatives from 1996 to 2000. She unsuccessfully ran for the Florida Senate in 2000, losing the Democratic primary to Al Lawson.

== History ==
Boyd moved to Tallahassee in 1972 with her husband, where she attended Tallahassee Community College, graduating with her associate's degree in nursing in 1975. She worked at a hospital and several managed-care plan start-up companies.

== Florida House of Representatives ==
When State Representative Allen Boyd opted to successfully run for Congress rather than seek re-election, Janegale Boyd, his sister-in-law, ran to succeed him in the 10th District, which stretched from Apalachicola to the Tallahassee suburbs and down into North Central Florida. Boyd faced former State Representative Gene Hodges, whom her brother-in-law succeeded in the House, in the Democratic primary. Owing largely to her strong margin in Jefferson County, where her hometown was located, Boyd narrowly defeated Hodges, 54–46%. In the general election, Boyd faced Bill Blue, the Republican nominee. Given Boyd's massive fundraising advantage over Blue, along with the district's strong Democratic lean, Boyd was widely expected to prevail. Boyd ended up defeating Blue in a landslide, winning 67% of the vote to his 33%, and winning sizable majorities in all of the district's counties. In 1998, Boyd won her second term in the House unopposed.

== 2000 State Senate campaign ==
In 2000, when incumbent State Senator Pat Thomas was unable to run for re-election due to term limits, Boyd ran to succeed him in the 3rd District, which included Bay, Calhoun, Franklin, Gadsden, Gulf, Jackson, Jefferson, Leon, Liberty, Madison, and Wakulla Counties. She faced fellow State Representative Al Lawson, former Leon County Sheriff Eddie Boone, and Dean J. Fenn in the Democratic primary. Given the sizable African-American electorate in the district, most observers assumed that Lawson would be able to secure a spot in the primary runoff based on his support from black voters, leaving Boone and Boyd to fight for the second spot in the runoff. The race quickly turned negative, with one political commentator calling it the "ugliest campaign" of the year, and Boyd calling it "one of the nastiest in state history." Florida Consumer Advocates, an association of the state's trial lawyers, backed Boone and spent hundreds of thousands of dollars attacking Boyd for her votes in favor of limiting public access to wetlands, selling drivers license information to private companies, and allowing holders of out-of-state concealed-carry permits to bring their weapons into the state. As expected, Lawson placed first in the primary, receiving 39% of the vote, and advanced to the runoff, where he was joined by Boyd, who edged out Boone for second place, 31–23%.

In the runoff, the trial lawyers continued to air advertisements against her, including a new advertisement that attacked her 1999 vote in favor of tort reform. The ad featured a Cocoa woman whose husband died when his tire blew out arguing that Boyd "voted to make it more difficult to sue companies like Firestone." Boyd condemned the advertisement as inaccurate, arguing that the group was blaming her for the Firestone accidents and that she cast her vote based on the best information she had at the time. Boyd, in turn, attacked Lawson for his vote against legislation that required mandatory sentences for criminals who used guns during crimes. Lawson, along with many other members of the legislature's black caucus, had voted against the legislation out of worries it would be disproportionately used against African-American offenders. Boyd convened a press conference to denounce the negative advertisements run against her, which Lawson crashed, using the opportunity to accuse her of "running ads that insinuate racism into this campaign," which he called "Willie Horton all over again."

Ultimately, despite the perceived closeness of the race and despite overwhelmingly outspending Lawson, Boyd lost the runoff to Lawson in a landslide, winning just 41% of the vote to his 59%. While Boyd won the counties that made up her State House district by wide margins, Lawson racked up larger margins in Gadsden County and Leon County, which ultimately allowed him to easily win. Lawson's primary victory eventually allowed him to serve as the first black State Senator to represent the area since Reconstruction.

== Later life ==
After leaving the legislature, Boyd became the president and CEO of the Florida Association of Homes and Services for the Aging. She was elected President of the Florida Nurses Association in 2017.
