= Allen Boyd =

American politician (born 1945)

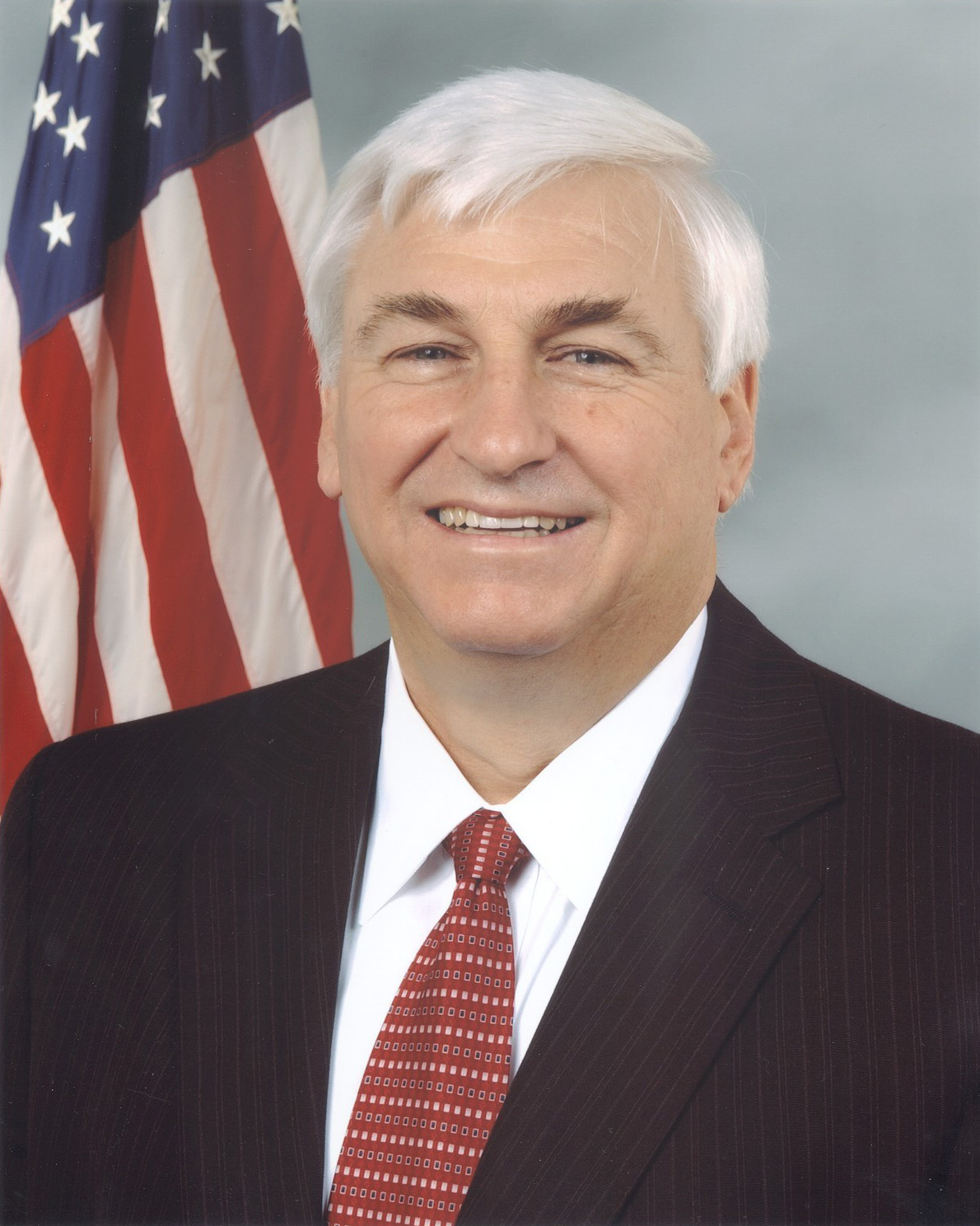

Member of the U.S. House of Representatives from Florida's 2nd district
- In office January 3, 1997 – January 3, 2011
- Preceded by: Pete Peterson
- Succeeded by: Steve Southerland

Member of the Florida House of Representatives from the 10th district
- In office November 3, 1992 – November 5, 1996
- Preceded by: Hurley Rudd
- Succeeded by: Janegale Boyd

Member of the Florida House of Representatives from the 11th district
- In office January 17, 1989 – November 3, 1992
- Preceded by: Gene Hodges
- Succeeded by: Randy Mackey

Personal details
- Born: Frederick Allen Boyd Jr. June 6, 1945 (age 81) Valdosta, Georgia, U.S.
- Party: Democratic
- Spouse(s): Cissy Roush (divorced) Jeannie Schmoe
- Children: 3
- Education: Florida State University (BS)

Military service
- Branch/service: United States Army
- Unit: Infantry Branch
- Battles/wars: Vietnam War

Frederick Allen Boyd Jr. (born June 6, 1945) is an American farmer, lobbyist and politician and the former United States representative for Florida's 2nd congressional district from 1997 to 2011. He is a member of the Democratic Party. He currently works for a lobbying firm, the Twenty-First Century Group.

== Early life, education and career ==
Boyd was born in Valdosta, Georgia to Margaret Elizabeth Finlayson and Frederick Allen Boyd. He was educated at Florida State University, where he was a member of Sigma Alpha Epsilon fraternity.

=== Vietnam War ===
After graduating in 1969, Boyd served as an infantry officer in Vietnam with the United States Army.

== Florida House of Representatives ==
Boyd first got elected after he won a special election in the 10th district after his predecessor Gene Hodges resigned on November 22, 1988. He served the district from the January 17, 1989 to November 3, 1992 and the 11th district from November 3, 1992 to November 5, 1996. He retired from the House, to run for Congress. He was succeeded in the State House by Janegale Boyd, his sister-in-law.

== U.S. House of Representatives ==
=== Committee assignments ===
- Committee on Appropriations
  - Subcommittee on Agriculture, Rural Development, Food and Drug Administration, and Related Agencies
  - Subcommittee on Defense
  - Subcommittee on Military Construction, Veterans Affairs, and Related Agencies
- Committee on the Budget

Boyd is a member of the Blue Dog Coalition.

== Political positions ==
=== Drug War ===
- On September 25, 2001, Boyd voted for HR 2586, an amendment to set up a task force on counter-terrorism and drug interdiction and allow military personnel to help patrol U.S. borders.
- On June 10, 2008, he voted for the Mérida Initiative to Combat Illicit Narcotics and Reduce Organized Crime Authorization Act, providing funding for Mexico to spend on drug prohibition related contracts. Opponents at the time complained this would increase the availability of military trained hit men to the drug cartels.

=== Iraq War ===
- On October 10, 2002, Allen Boyd was among the 81 House Democrats who voted in favor of authorizing the invasion of Iraq.

=== 2008 financial crisis ===
- On October 3, 2008, Boyd voted for the Emergency Economic Stabilization Act of 2008. He later voted against the American Recovery and Reinvestment Act of 2009.
- On December 11, 2009, Boyd voted for the Wall Street Reform and Consumer Protection Act of 2009.

=== Health care ===
- In November 2009, Boyd voted along with 39 other Democrats against the Affordable Health Care for America Act.
- On March 19, 2010, Boyd announced his support for the Health Care Reform Bill under consideration in the House and Senate.

=== Gulf of Mexico Oil Spill ===
- In April 2010, the Deepwater Horizon oil spill resulted from an explosion on a drilling platform, killing 11 workers and leaking millions of barrels of oil into the Gulf of Mexico. On May 5, 2010, Boyd introduced legislation in the U.S. House of Representatives that would raise the liability cap on economic damages in oil spills from $75 million to $10 billion. The legislation would alter the Oil Pollution Act of 1990, which was passed after the 1989 Exxon Valdez spill and requires companies to pay for all cleanup costs of spills but only up to $75 million in economic damages.
- On June 14, Boyd held the Joint Oil Spill-Hurricane Planning conference at Florida State University's, Panama City campus to examine the potential threat of a Gulf of Mexico hurricane colliding with the Deepwater Horizon oil spill. Federal and state emergency response agencies, representatives from the Coast Guard, Air Force and Navy, and members of the local tourism industry all participated in the day-long event.
- On June 11, Boyd sent a letter to the President of the United States, asking him to create a Gulf seafood safety task force to counter growing public perception that all seafood harvested in the Gulf of Mexico is contaminated by oil.

== Political campaigns ==
=== 1996–2008 ===
Boyd entered the 1996 Democratic primary for the 2nd in 1996, after three-term Democratic incumbent Pete Peterson announced his retirement. He led a three-way Democratic primary with 48 percent of the vote, a few thousand votes short of outright victory. He then won the runoff with 64 percent of the vote and easily won the election in November. He was reelected with no major-party opposition in 1998 and defeated an underfunded Republican in 2000.

In 2002, however, the Republican-controlled state legislature significantly altered Boyd's district. Part of heavily Democratic Tallahassee, which has anchored the district since its formation in 1963 (as the 9th District; it was renumbered the 2nd in 1967) was shifted to the Jacksonville-based 3rd District. In its place, heavily Republican Panama City was shifted from the Pensacola-based 1st District to the 2nd. On paper, this made the district considerably friendlier to Republicans; Al Gore narrowly won the old 2nd in 2000, but George W. Bush would have narrowly won the district under its current boundaries. However, Boyd was handily reelected with 66 percent of the vote in 2002 against another underfunded Republican. In 2004, Boyd faced his first serious test in the form of state representative Bev Kilmer, but Boyd turned back this challenge fairly easily, taking 62 percent of the vote even as George W. Bush carried the district with 54 percent of the vote. Boyd was unopposed for reelection in 2006 and defeated a nominal Republican challenger in 2008.

=== 2010 ===
In 2010, Boyd fended off a spirited challenge in the primary from a more liberal Democrat, State Senator Al Lawson, with whom he'd served in the state house. In the general election, Boyd was defeated by Republican nominee Steve Southerland in the 2010 election, taking only 41 percent of the vote. Independent candidates Paul C. McKain and Dianne Berryhill were also on the ballot; Ray Netherwood qualified as a write-in candidate.

== Farming career ==
Boyd is a fifth-generation farmer from Monticello, Florida and is the majority owner of Boyd Family Farms Inc. Boyd has received almost $1.3 million in federal farm subsidies since 1996, placing him in the top 3 percent of farmers receiving subsidies nationally, and 12th among more than 5,300 farms in his district that received subsidy money over this period.

== Personal life ==
Boyd is married to Jeannie Schmoe and has 3 grown children (2 sons and 1 daughter) from his previous marriage to Cissy Roush. His son John was imprisoned in 2008 for transporting illegal narcotics and illegal aliens into the United States from Mexico.

U.S. House of Representatives
| Preceded by Pete Peterson | Member of the U.S. House of Representatives from Florida's 2nd congressional district 1997–2011 | Succeeded by Steve Southerland |
Party political offices
| Preceded by Charles Stenholm | Chair of the Blue Dog Coalition for Policy; 2001–2003; Served alongside: Chris John (Administration), Jim Turner (Communications) | Succeeded by Charles Stenholm |
| Preceded by Jim Matheson | Chair of the Blue Dog Coalition for Administration; 2007–2009; Served alongside: Mike Ross (Communications), Dennis Moore (Policy) | Succeeded by Stephanie Herseth Sandlin |
U.S. order of precedence (ceremonial)
| Preceded by Dave Weldon as Former U.S. Representative | Order of precedence of the United States as Former U.S. Representative | Succeeded by John Wiley Bryant as Former U.S. Representative |
