= Robert Davidson Woodward =

American politician (1909–1982)

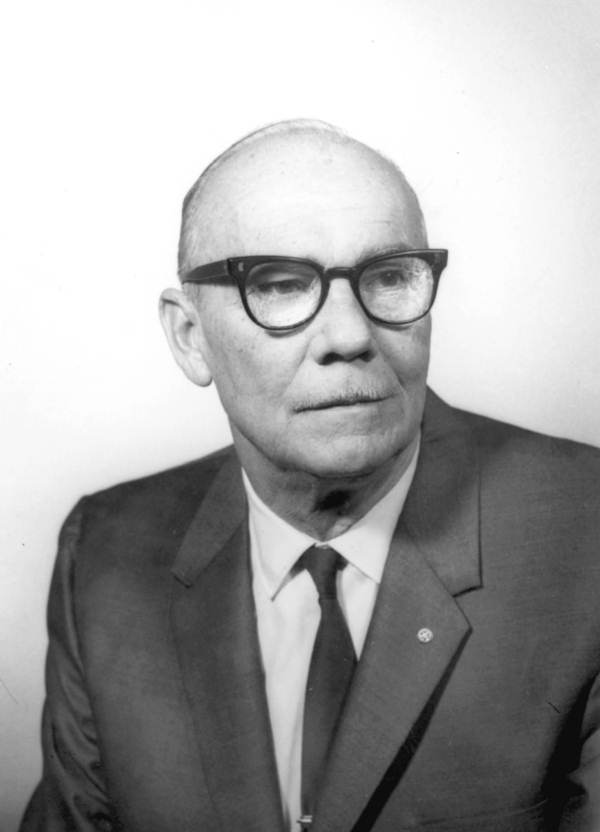
- Woodward in 1969

Member of the Florida House of Representatives from the 10th district
- In office 1968–1972
- Preceded by: W. M. Inman
- Succeeded by: Pat Thomas

Personal details
- Born: August 2, 1909 Quincy, Florida, U.S.
- Died: February 25, 1982 (aged 72)
- Party: Democratic
- Education: Emory University

Robert Davidson Woodward (August 2, 1909 – February 25, 1982), also known as R. D. Woodward Jr., was an American politician. He served as a Democratic member for the 10th district of the Florida House of Representatives.

== Life and career ==
Woodward was born in Quincy, Florida. He attended Emory University.

In 1968, Woodward was elected to represent the 10th district of the Florida House of Representatives, succeeding W. M. Inman. He served until 1972, when he was succeeded by Pat Thomas.

Woodward died on February 25, 1982, at the age of 72.
