= Chuck Brannan =

American politician from Florida

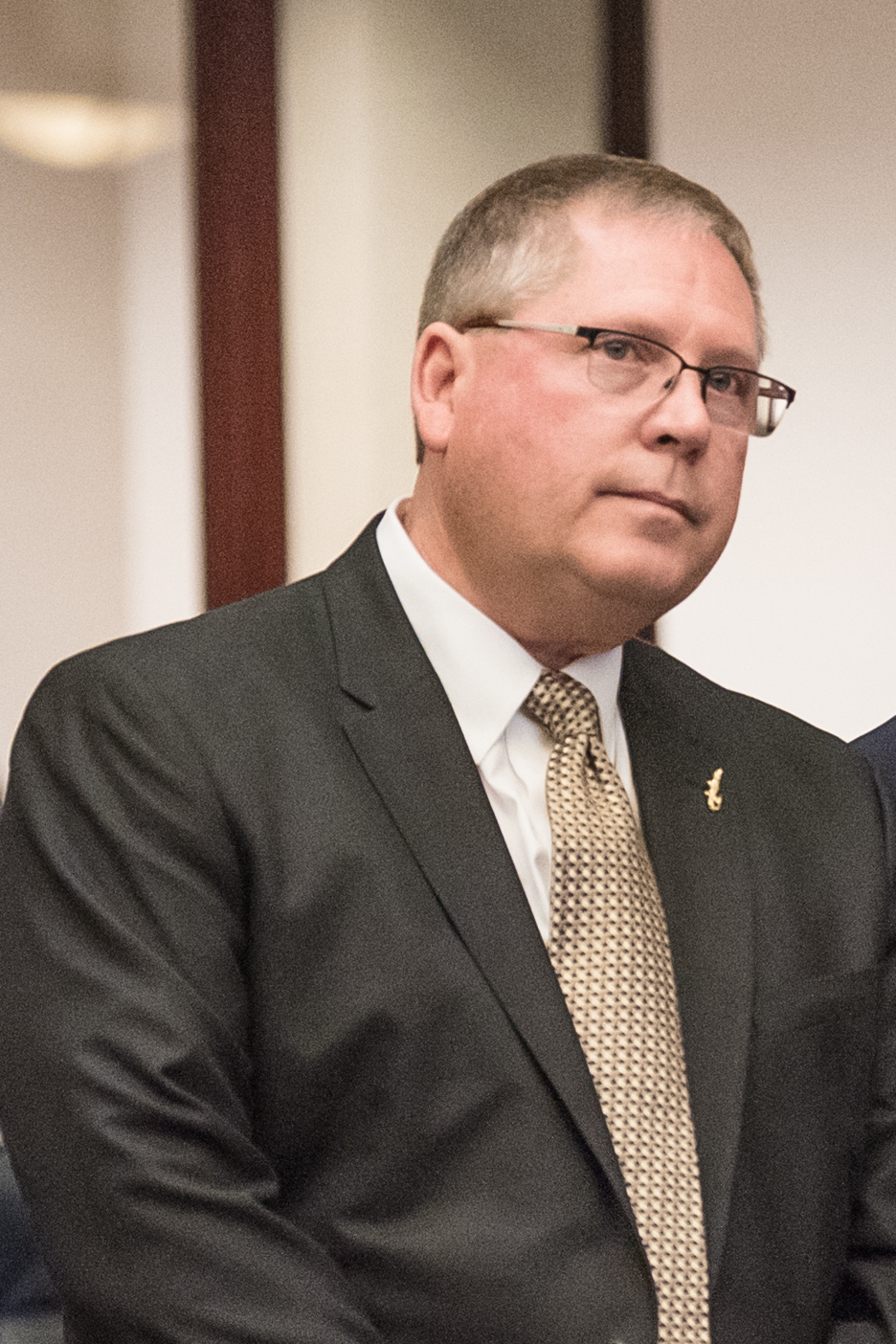

Member of the Florida House of Representatives from the 10th district
- In office November 6, 2018 – November 3, 2026
- Preceded by: Elizabeth Porter
- Succeeded by: Marshall Rawson

Personal details
- Born: February 1, 1962 (age 64)
- Party: Republican
- Spouse: Lorelie Brannan
- Education: Lake City Community College (AA); University of Florida (BA)
- Occupation: Retired law enforcement officer

Robert Charles "Chuck" Brannan III (born February 1, 1962) is a Republican member of the Florida Legislature representing the state's 10th House district, which includes Baker, Columbia, Hamilton, and Suwannee counties and part of Alachua County.

== History ==
A seventh-generation Floridian, Brannan worked in law enforcement for 29 years, including stints as a deputy U.S. Marshal and the chief investigator for the Baker County Sheriff's Office. He received a bachelor's degree in criminal justice and lives in Macclenny, Florida.

== Florida House of Representatives ==
Running to succeed term-limited Rep. Elizabeth Porter, Brannan won the August 28, 2018 Republican primary, defeating Marc Vann. In the November 6, 2018 general election, Brannan easily defeated Democrat Ronald W. Williams II and two candidates with no party affiliation.
