= Leonard Bembry =

American politician

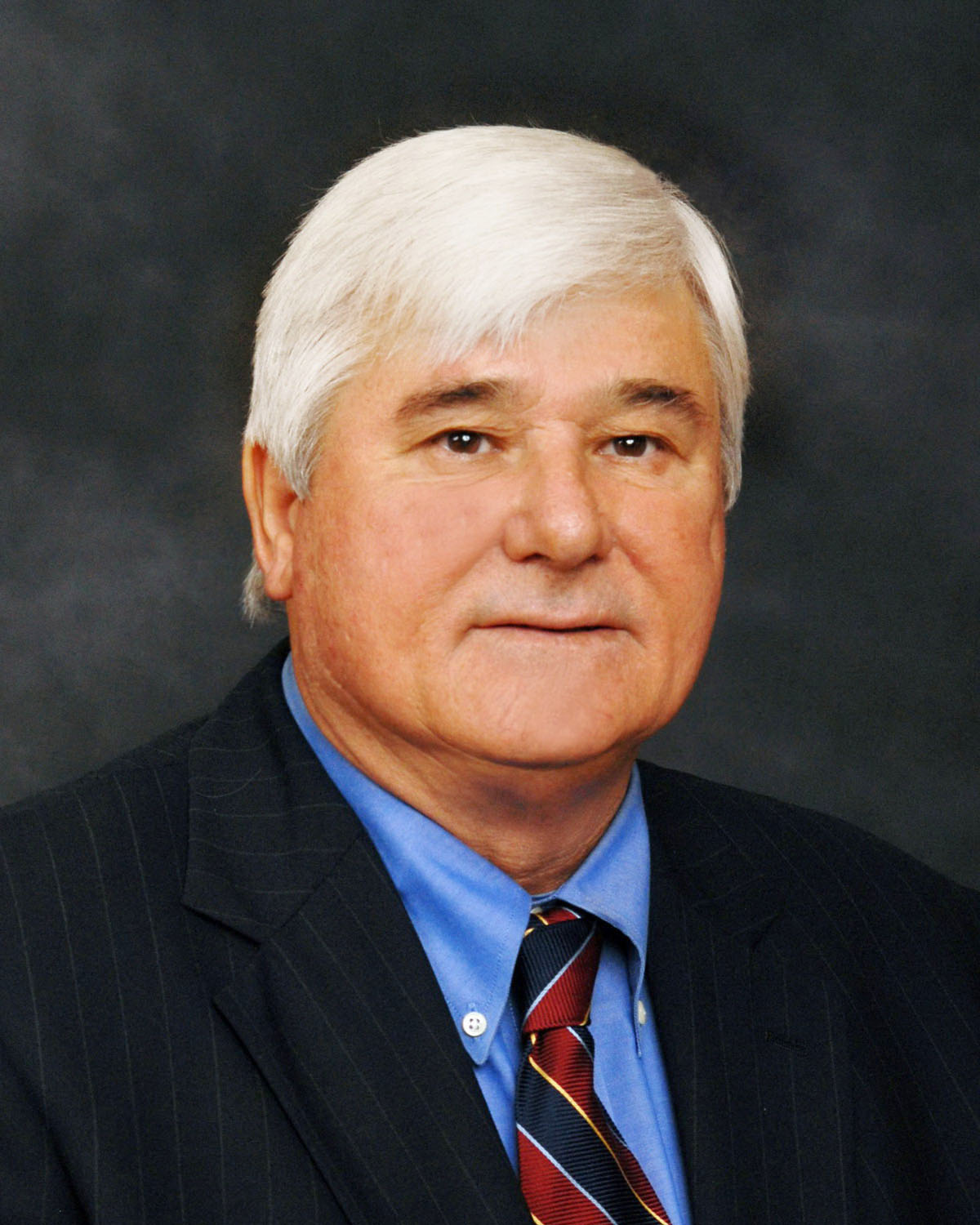

Member of the Florida House of Representatives from the 10th district
- In office November 4, 2008 – November 6, 2012
- Preceded by: Will Kendrick
- Succeeded by: Elizabeth W. Porter

Personal details
- Born: August 24, 1947 (age 79) Jasper, Florida, U.S.
- Party: Democratic
- Spouse: Susan Bembry
- Children: Lori L. Weldon, Jacquelyn M. "Missy" Culp, Leonard L. "Kipp" Bembry Jr.
- Education: North Florida Community College (AA))
- Occupation: Retail, farmer

Leonard L. Bembry is an American Democratic politician who served in the Florida House of Representatives from 2008 to 2012. Bembry represented the 10th District in the House, which included Hamilton, Madison, and Taylor Counties, and parts of Alachua, Columbia, Dixie, Franklin, Jefferson, Levy, and Wakulla Counties. He ran for Congress in 2012, but lost in the Democratic primary to Al Lawson.

== History ==
Bembry was born in Jasper, Florida on his family's tobacco farm. He worked as a page in the Florida Legislature in 1960, and his cousin, Payton Bembry, Jr., served in the State House in the mid-1960s. Bembry attended North Florida Community College, receiving his associates degree, and Florida State University, though he did not graduate. He later owned and operated his family tobacco farm, and acquired three other farms in North Florida with his wife, including Pettis Springs Farm in Greenville. Bembry participated in the Florida Farm Bureau's County Alliance for Responsible Environmental Stewardship program, organized against the construction of a coal-fired energy plant near his farms. In addition to farming, Bembry also owned and operated University Homes, a mobile home dealership and served as a member of the Madison County Development Council.

== Career ==
=== Florida House ===
When incumbent Republican state representative Will Kendrick was term-limited in the 10th House District, Bembry announced a campaign to replace him, running as a conservative Democrat. Bembry faced Julie Conley, the director of the Jefferson County Economic Development Council and the former mayor of Monticello, in the Democratic primary. Bembry defeated Conley 58–42%.

In the general election, Bembry faced Don Curtis, a small business owner and former assistant director of the Florida Division of Forestry. Bembry emphasized that he was a "very conservative Democrat" and argued that while the state budget needed to be prioritized, "we don't need to raise more taxes." He campaigned on his experience on the county development council, arguing that the county's model should be expanded across the district to develop infrastructure and attract jobs. He won the endorsements of unions like the AFL-CIO, AFSCME, the Communication Workers of America, and other trade unions. Bembry won the election 54–46%.

During his first term in the legislature, Bembry successfully passed legislation that waived therapist confidentiality when their patient poses a "clear and imminent probability of harm" and that established a pest control insurance fund to finance pest control operations.

In 2010, Bembry ran for re-election and faced Republican David Feigin, a retired Coast Guard veteran and a pizzeria owner. Bembry defeating Feigin by a wide 59–41% margin.

In Bembry's second and final term in the legislature, he worked with Madison County residents to shut down an attempt by Nestlé to extract 1.5 million gallons of water every day from the Wacissa River and bottle it, which resulted in the county commission enacting an aquifer protection ordinance. When Governor Rick Scott attempted to close down the Jefferson Correctional Institution in Monticello, Bembry attempted to convince the House budget committee to oppose the effort, but was ultimately unsuccessful.

=== 2012 congressional campaign ===
On November 17, 2011, Bembry announced that he would challenge Republican Congressman Steve Southerland in Florida's 2nd congressional district in 2012 rather than seek a third term in the legislature. Bembry began his campaign by criticizing Southerland for not keeping the promises he made in 2010, and by announcing that he would focus on job creation, cutting taxes, protecting seniors, and protecting the region's water resources. Owing to his reputation as the "most conservative Democrat in the House," he was endorsed by the Blue Dog PAC, which supports conservative Democrats. Bembry faced former state senator Al Lawson, former Bay County Democratic Party chairman Alvin Peters, and Florida Innocence Project chairman Mark Schlakman in the Democratic primary. Former Republican state senator Nancy Argenziano was planning on joining the race, but she was barred by state law from running as a Democrat, and so opted to run for the state house instead.

Bembry started off the race as the Democratic Congressional Campaign Committee's preferred candidate, featuring him as running in an "emerging race." However, members of the Congressional Black Caucus, like Congresswoman Corrine Brown and then-Assistant Democratic Leader Jim Clyburn, split with party leadership, endorsing Lawson.

Lawson won the Democratic primary by a wide margin, receiving 55% of the vote to Bembry's 26%, Peters's 14%, and Schlakman's 5%.
