= Travis Cummings =

American politician

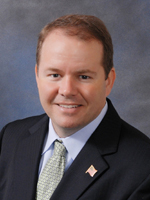

Member of the Florida House of Representatives from the 18th district
- In office November 20, 2012 – November 3, 2020
- Preceded by: Redistricted
- Succeeded by: Sam Garrison

Personal details
- Born: June 30, 1972 (age 54) Jacksonville, Florida
- Party: Republican
- Spouse: Jessica Cummings
- Children: Beckham, Fletcher, Hattie
- Education: Valdosta State University (B.A.); University of North Florida (M.B.A.)
- Profession: Businessman

W. Travis Cummings (born June 30, 1972) is a former Republican member of the Florida House of Representatives, who represented the 18th District, which includes most of northern Clay County, from 2012 to 2020.

== History ==
Cummings attended Valdosta State University, where he graduated with a degree in accounting in 1994. He later attended the University of North Florida, graduating with a Master of Business Administration in 2002. Cummings works as a businessman, specializing in employee benefits consulting. From 2002 to 2008, he served on the Orange Park City Council, and served as Mayor from 2004 to 2005. In 2008, Cummings was elected to the Clay County Commission from the 3rd District, receiving 72% of the vote against independent candidate Ron Raymond.

== Florida House of Representatives ==
In 2012, following the reconfiguration of Florida House districts, Cummings opted to run in the newly created 18th District. He did not face an opponent in the Republican primary or the general election, and was sworn in later that year. While in the Florida House of Representatives, Cummings sponsored legislation that would narrowly expand Medicare as provided for under the Patient Protection and Affordable Care Act, providing "$2000 to low-income parents and those eligible for disability under Social Security."

In 2018, Travis Cummings ran unopposed in the General Election, retaining his District 18 seat.

In February 2020, Cummings received praise from other members of the Florida House of Representatives when he cut off a man from testifying after the man began associating LGBT people with pedophiles.
