= Terrance Freeman =

American politician

Member of the Florida House of Representatives from the 12th district
- Incumbent
- Assumed office November 3, 2026
- Preceded by: Wyman Duggan

Personal details
- Born: January 24, 1975 (age 51)
- Party: Republican
- Website: Campaign website

Terrance Freeman (born January 24, 1975) is an American politician. A member of the Republican Party, he has served in the Florida House of Representatives since 2026, representing the 12th district. He was a member of Jacksonville City Council. Freeman is the father of five children. He graduated from University of North Florida with a bachelor's degree and from California University of Pennsylvania with a master's degree in sports psychology.
