= Cord Byrd =

American politician

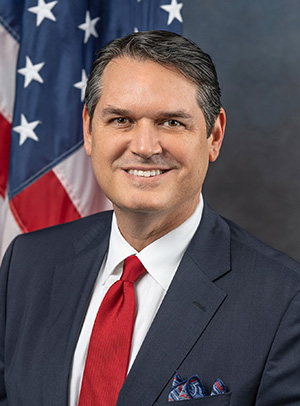

37th Secretary of State of Florida
- In office May 16, 2022 – November 20, 2026
- Governor: Ron DeSantis
- Preceded by: Laurel Lee
- Succeeded by: Jennifer Kennedy (interim)

Member of the Florida House of Representatives from the 11th district
- In office November 8, 2016 – May 16, 2022
- Preceded by: Janet Adkins
- Succeeded by: Sam Garrison

Personal details
- Born: April 19, 1971 (age 55) Jacksonville, Florida, U.S.
- Party: Republican
- Education: United States Air Force Academy (attended); University of North Florida (BA); St. Thomas University (JD)

James Cord Byrd (born April 19, 1971) is an American attorney and Republican politician serving as the secretary of state of Florida. Previously, he was a member of the Florida House of Representatives, representing Nassau County and part of Duval County from 2016 until his appointment as secretary of state.

== Early life and education ==
Byrd was born in Jacksonville, Florida. He attended the United States Air Force Academy for one year before earning a Bachelor of Arts degree in political science and government from the University of North Florida. In 1997, he earned a Juris Doctor from the St. Thomas University School of Law.

== Career ==
Byrd worked as an attorney at Leal & Ring, P.A from 1997 to 2004 and Gonzalez & Porcher from 2004 to 2007. Since 2007, he has operated an independent legal practice. Byrd was elected to the Florida House of Representatives in 2016. During his tenure, Byrd served as vice chair of the Public Integrity & Elections Committee during the 2019–2020 legislative session and vice chair of the House Judiciary Committee, in the 2021–2022 legislative session.

In 2019, Byrd sponsored a bill banning sanctuary cities in Florida. In April of that year the Florida House passed the bill with 69–47 nearly along party lines.

In May 2022, Governor Ron DeSantis selected Byrd to succeed Laurel Lee as secretary of state of Florida.

Florida House of Representatives
Preceded by Janet Adkins	Member of the Florida House of Representatives from the 11th district 2016–2022	Succeeded by Sam Garrison
Political offices
Preceded by Laurel Lee	Secretary of State of Florida; 2022–present	Incumbent
