= Miley Miers =

American politician

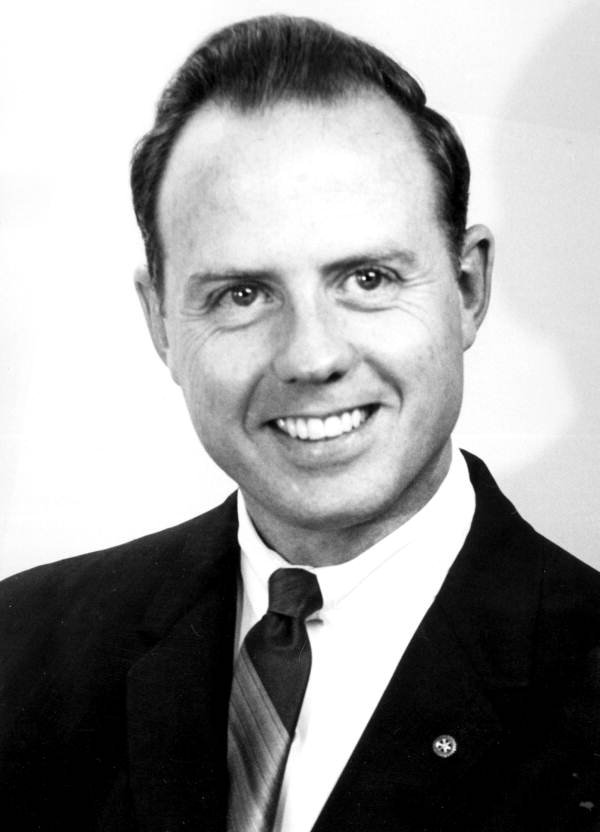
- Miers in 1966

Member of the Florida House of Representatives from Franklin–Leon–Wakulla
- In office 1966–1967

Member of the Florida House of Representatives from the 12th district
- In office 1967–1970
- Preceded by: District established
- Succeeded by: Carroll Webb

Personal details
- Born: February 6, 1927 Montgomery, Alabama, U.S.
- Died: September 2010 (aged 83)
- Party: Democratic

Miley Miers II (February 6, 1927 – September 2010) was an American politician. He served as a Democratic member for the 12th district of the Florida House of Representatives.
