= Herb Morgan =

American politician

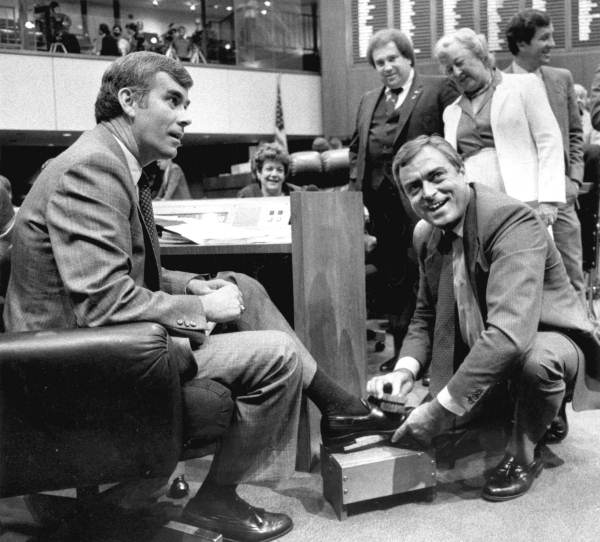
- Morgan (left) with Tom McPherson in 1974

Member of the Florida House of Representatives from the 12th district
- In office 1974–1982
- Preceded by: Carroll Webb
- Succeeded by: Wayne Hollingsworth

Member of the Florida House of Representatives from the 10th district
- In office 1982–1986
- Preceded by: James Harold Thompson
- Succeeded by: Hurley Rudd

Personal details
- Born: October 6, 1943
- Died: December 19, 2003 (aged 60)
- Party: Democratic
- Education: Florida State University

Herb Morgan (October 16, 1943 – December 19, 2003) was an American politician. He served as a Democratic member for the 10th and 12th district of the Florida House of Representatives.

== Life and career ==
Morgan attended Florida State University.

In 1974, Morgan was elected to represent the 12th district of the Florida House of Representatives, succeeding Carroll Webb. He served until 1982, when he was succeeded by Wayne Hollingsworth. In the same year, he was elected to represent the 10th district, succeeding James Harold Thompson. He served until 1986, when he was succeeded by Hurley W. Rudd.

Morgan died in December 2003 of cancer, at the age of 60.
