= T. Terrell Sessums =

American politician (1930–2020)

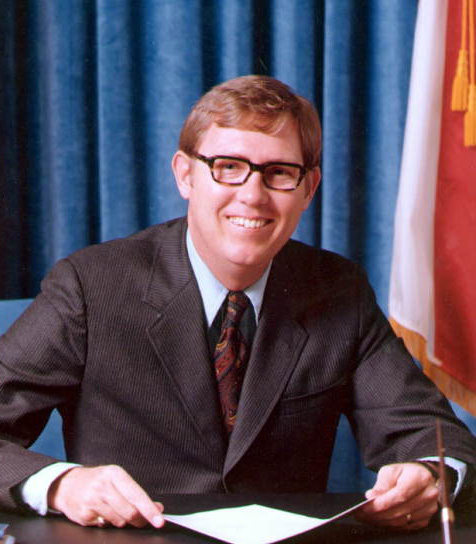

Chairman of the Florida Board of Regents
- In office 1979–1988

Speaker of the Florida House of Representatives
- In office 1972–1974
- Preceded by: Richard A. Pettigrew
- Succeeded by: Donald L. Tucker

Member of the Florida House of Representatives from the 65th district
- In office 1963–1972
- Preceded by: Constitutional revision
- Succeeded by: Decennial Redistricting

Member of the Florida House of Representatives from the 66th district
- In office 1972–1974
- Preceded by: Decennial Redistricting
- Succeeded by: H. Lee Moffitt

Personal details
- Born: Thomas Terrell Sessums; June 11, 1930 Daytona Beach, Florida, US
- Died: June 6, 2020 (aged 89) Tampa, Florida, US
- Party: Democratic
- Spouse: Neva
- Children: 3
- Education: University of Florida (B.A.) (J.D.)
- Profession: Lawyer

Military service
- Allegiance: United States
- Branch/service: United States Air Force
- Years of service: 1952–1956
- Rank: Captain

Thomas Terrell Sessums (June 11, 1930 – June 6, 2020) was an American politician from Florida. He served as the Speaker of the Florida House of Representatives from 1972 to 1974.

== Early life ==
Thomas Terrell Sessums was born June 11, 1930, in Daytona Beach, Florida, United States. He was raised in Jacksonville, Florida, graduated from Andrew Jackson High School and then moved with his family to Tampa, Florida, after he started college.

== Education ==
Sessums graduated from the University of Florida with his bachelor's degree and Juris Doctor and began his law practice in Tampa. While at the University of Florida Sessums was president of the student body (1952–1953) and member of Florida Blue Key. Sessums also served in the United States Air Force.

== Politics ==
He served as a member of the Florida House of Representatives from 1963 - 1974. During the 1972-74 session he served as Speaker of the House. He was also Chairman of the Florida Board of Regents, and is serving on the Board of Governors for Florida Southern College. He also served as president of the board of trustees at the University of Tampa.

== Later years ==
Sessums has received four honorary degrees (Rollins College, Flagler College, the University of South Florida, and Florida Southern College), and has been awarded the Distinguished Service Award by the Florida Association of Colleges and Universities.

On June 7, 2013, T. Terrell Sessums was honored with the Lifetime Achievement Award from the League of Women Voters of Hillsborough County, Florida.

Sessums resided Tampa for the rest of his life. His wife Neva Sessums died on April 19, 2013.

He died on June 6, 2020.

== Legacy ==
T. Terrell Sessums Elementary School in Riverview, Florida, was named in his honor when it opened in 2003. In 1965 Terrell Sessums introduced a bill into the Florida Legislature which created the Tampa Sports Authority and which led to the building of the original Tampa Stadium. In 1967 Terrell Sessums introduced legislation which formed by Special Act the Environmental Protection Commission of Hillsborough County. In 2009 Terrell Sessums was honored by having a Tampa Bay Environmental Excellence Award named after him. Subsequently, there have been 4 winners of the Terrell Sessums Environmental Award. Sessums Mall on the campus of the University of South Florida was dedicated in 1999.
