= Florida's 12th House of Representatives district =

American legislative district

Florida's 12th State House of Representatives district
Representative
Terrance Freeman; R–Jacksonville
- Demographics: 70.2% White; 15.4% Black; 10.5% Hispanic; 7.2% Asian; 0.3% Native American; 0.1% Hawaiian/Pacific Islander; 3.1% Other
- Population (2010) • Voting age: 156,867; 121,055

Florida's 12th House district elects one member of the Florida House of Representatives. The district is represented by Terrance Freeman. This district is located in Northeast Florida, and encompasses part of the First Coast, as well as the eastern part of the Jacksonville metropolitan area. The district also contains the eastern half of the Arlington and the part of the Southside neighborhoods of Jacksonville. The district covers part of eastern Duval County. The district is located entirely within Jacksonville, though it only contains part of the city. As of the 2010 census, the district's population is 156,867.

This district contains the University of North Florida, located in the Southside neighborhood of Jacksonville.

== Representatives from 1967 to the present ==
Representatives by party affiliation
Party	Representatives
Democratic	6
Republican	5

#	Name	Term of service	Residence	Political party
1	Miley Miers	1967–1972	Tallahassee	Democratic
2	Carroll Webb	1972–1974	Tallahassee	Democratic
3	Herb Morgan	1974–1982	Tallahassee	Democratic
4	Wayne Hollingsworth	1982–1986	Lake City	Democratic
5	Randy Mackey	1986–1992	Lake City	Democratic
6	George Crady	1992–2000	Yulee	Democratic
7	Aaron Bean	2000–2008	Fernandina Beach	Republican
8	Janet Adkins	2008–2012	Fernandina Beach	Republican
9	Lake Ray	2012–2016	Jacksonville	Republican
10	Clay Yarborough	2016–2022	Jacksonville	Republican
11	Wyman Duggan	2022-2026	Jacksonville	Republican
12	Terrance Freeman	2026-present	Jacksonville	Republican

== See also ==
- Florida's 4th Senate district
- Florida's 6th Senate district
- Florida's 4th congressional district
- Florida's 5th congressional district
