= Debbie Boyd =

American politician

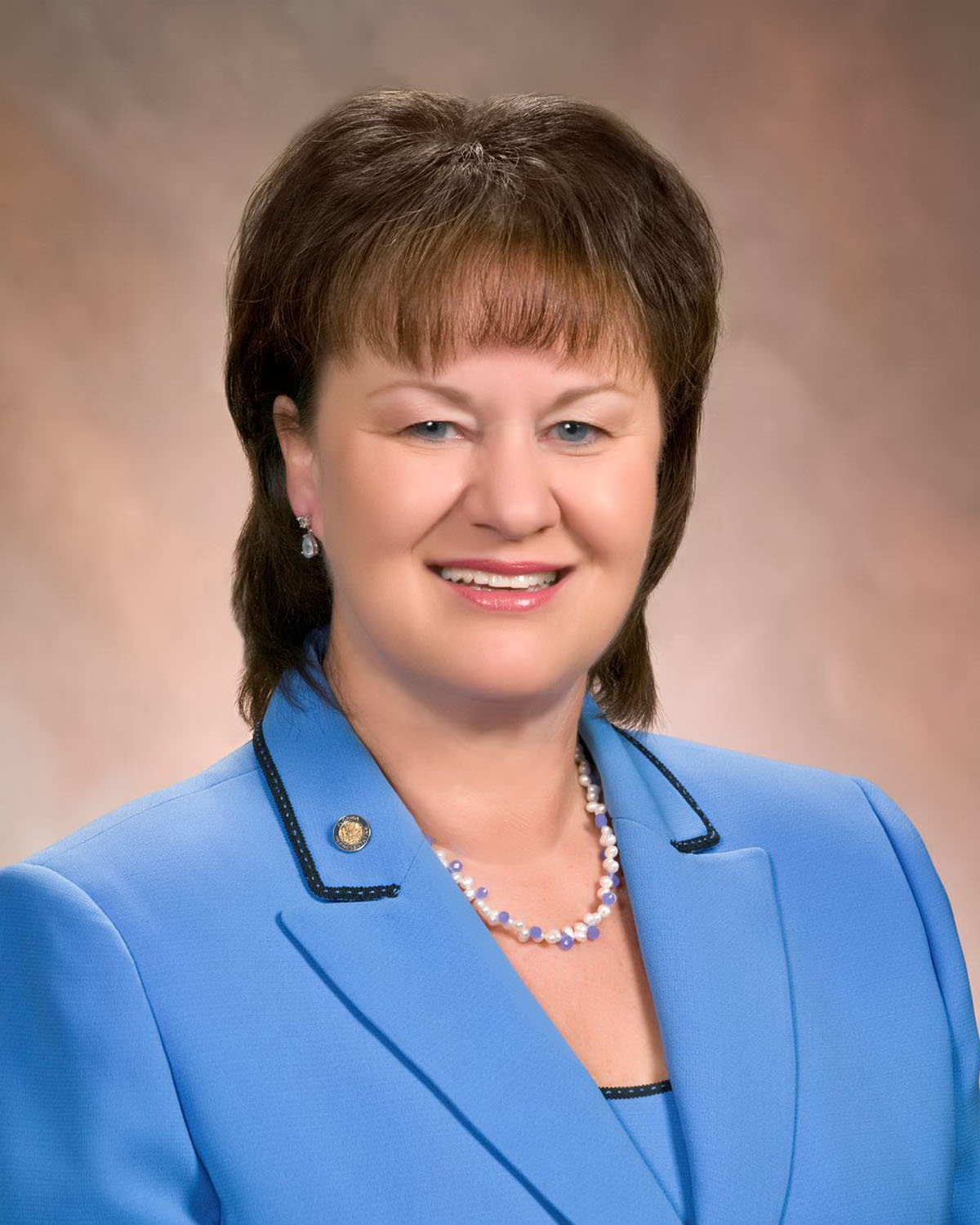

Member of the Florida House of Representatives from the 11th district
- In office November 21, 2006 – November 16, 2010
- Preceded by: Dwight Stansel
- Succeeded by: Elizabeth W. Porter

Personal details
- Born: November 28, 1957 (age 68) Gainesville, Florida, U.S.
- Party: Democratic
- Spouse: Tommy Boyd
- Profession: Realtor

Debbie Boyd (born November 28, 1957, in Gainesville, Florida) is a representative in the Florida House of Representatives. She received her associate degree in building construction from Santa Fe College in 1990. She resides in Newberry, Florida, and lives with her husband Tommy Boyd.
