= Don C. Price =

American politician (1926–2017)

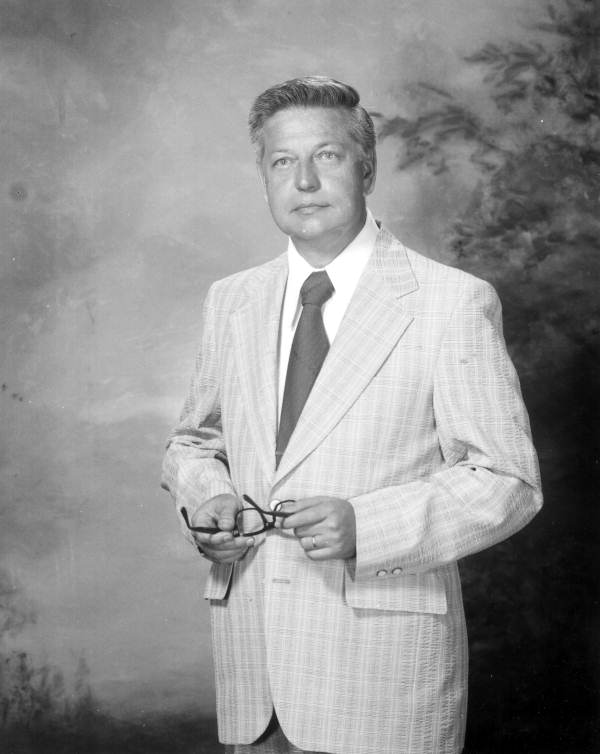
- Price in 1975

Member of the Florida House of Representatives from the 11th district
- In office 1978–1982
- Preceded by: Donald L. Tucker
- Succeeded by: Gene Hodges

Personal details
- Born: August 4, 1926 Birmingham, Alabama, U.S.
- Died: February 6, 2017 (aged 90)
- Party: Democratic

Don C. Price (August 4, 1926 – February 6, 2017) was an American politician. He served as a Democratic member for the 11th district of the Florida House of Representatives.

== Life and career ==
Price was born in Birmingham, Alabama.

In 1978, Price was elected to represent the 11th district of the Florida House of Representatives, succeeding Donald L. Tucker. He served until 1982, when he was succeeded by Gene Hodges.

Price died February 6, 2017, at the age of 90.
