= Sam Garrison (politician) =

American politician

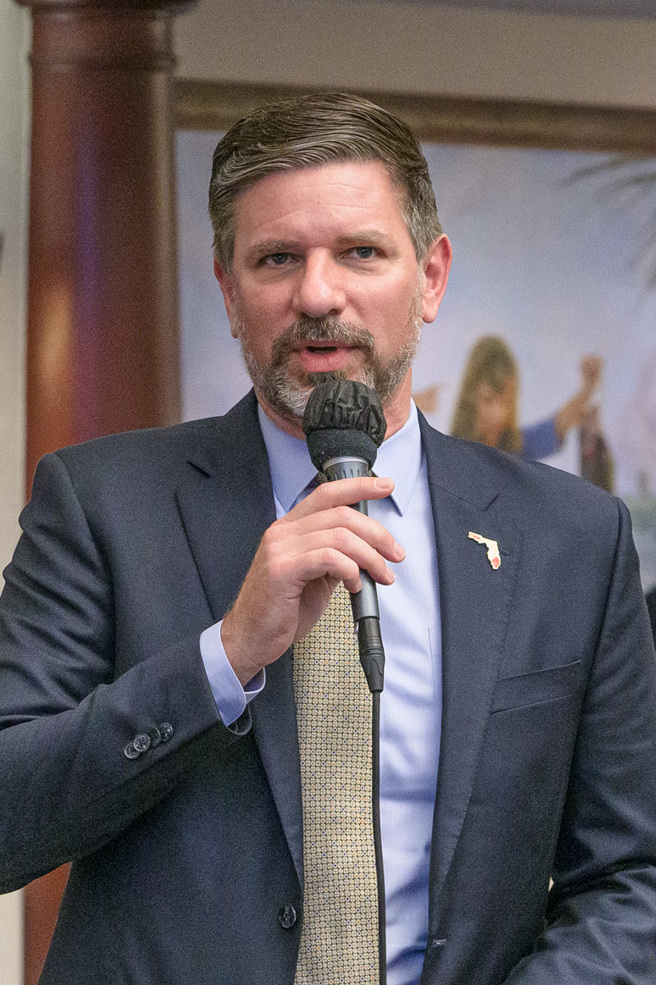

91st Speaker of the Florida House of Representatives
- Incumbent
- Assumed office 17 November 2026
- Preceded by: Wyman Duggan (acting); Daniel Perez

Member of the Florida House of Representatives
- Incumbent
- Assumed office 3 November 2020
- Preceded by: Travis Cummings
- Constituency: 18th district (2020–2022); 11th district (2022–present)

Personal details
- Born: November 13, 1976 (age 50) Peoria, Illinois, U.S.
- Party: Republican
- Spouse: Gayle Simpson Garrison
- Children: 2
- Education: Samford University (BA); University of Illinois College of Law (JD)
- Profession: Attorney

Sam Garrison (born November 13, 1976) is an American politician who is currently the Speaker of the Florida House of Representatives. He has served in the Florida House of Representatives since 2020. He currently serves as the incumbent for Florida's 11th House of Representatives district.

== Early life and education ==
Garrison was born in Peoria, Illinois, on November 13, 1976. He moved to Florida in 2001. He graduated from Samford University with a Bachelor of Arts degree in international relations and received a Juris Doctor from the University of Illinois College of Law.

== Legal career ==
Garrison worked as an Assistant State Attorney in the Fourth Judicial Circuit from 2001 to 2011. He subsequently worked as an attorney in private practice. He was Board Certified in criminal trial law from 2013 to 2018 and served as president of the Clay County Bar Association from 2015 to 2016.

== Political career ==
=== Florida House of Representatives ===
Garrison was first elected to the Florida House of Representatives in 2020 and was subsequently reelected.

During the 2024–2026 legislative term, Garrison served as chair of the Rules & Ethics Committee and was also a member of the Budget Committee.

==== Appointment as Speaker ====
In October 2025, House Republicans formally designated Garrison to succeed Daniel Perez as Speaker, he is scheduled to become Speaker following the 2026 elections. The designation was made unanimously by the Republicans in the House of Representatives, who hold the majority of seats in the chamber.

Garrison was re-elected unopposed in the 2026 Republican primary and general elections for the 11th district.

Garrison began him term as the 91st Speaker of the Florida House for the 2026–2028 legislative term on November 17, 2026.

== Personal life ==
Garrison is an Anglican. Garrison is also married to Gayle Simpson Garrison and has two children. He lists American history, baseball, golf, football, music and reading among his main interests.
