= Chental-Song Bembry =

American children's book author

- Born: November 5, 1996 (age 29); Newark, New Jersey, United States
- Occupations: Author, illustrator, motivational speaker
- Years active: 2010–present

Chental-Song Bembry (born November 5, 1996) is an American author, illustrator and motivational speaker on literacy. She wrote The Honey Bunch Kids, a series of novels for middle-schoolers. Bembry, a native of New Jersey, wrote the first book when she was 13, based on characters she made up in her childhood.

== The Honey Bunch Kids ==
Bembry was born on November 5, 1996, in Newark, New Jersey. As a child, she was an avid reader with an interest in writing and cartooning. At the age of 10, she created three characters: Desiree "Dizzy" Williams, Chauncey "Cheeks" Willis, and Stuart Glover. Bembry originally drew her characters in a comic strip called My Life is a Total Mezz Up. When she turned 11, her mother inspired her to pursue entrepreneurship. She started a t-shirt business and began painting her three characters on blank t-shirts. Later that year, her mother sent her to a writing camp at Middlesex County College titled "How to Publish Your Own Book". Bembry wrote a story about Dizzy, Cheeks and Stuart exploring life as sixth-graders. This story, which she titled The Honey Bunch Kids, was later published into a hard-bound book at the end of the writing camp. In 2010, at the age of 13, Bembry self-published what would be the first of The Honey Bunch Kids series. The books feature 11-year-olds who meet on the first day of school after missing the bus and walking in the rain. Together, they learn to negotiate bullies and other social hurdles. The series focuses on teaching kids kindness, patience and respect.

== Promoting literacy ==
As a teen author, Bembry started a literacy campaign and traveled to schools, libraries, churches and book clubs to speak to youth about the importance of literacy, goal setting, and the impacts of reading on academic success.

== Awards and recognition ==
At the age of 14, Bembry attended the Black Enterprise Youth Entrepreneur's Conference and was twice named "Entrepreneur of the Week". Black Enterprise also listed Bembry in the article "5 Young Moguls of Color Paving the Way For Your Children." In addition, Black Enterprise named Bembry in an article titled "Under 21 and Winning: 8 Young Bosses to Watch in 2013". Bembry was highlighted in Ebony magazine and was included in a collection of African American youth successes in Black Child Journal.

When she was later a student at Hampton University, Bembry was recognized at the 2015 BET Honors award show for her accomplishments and community service as a young author. She was featured as a M.A.D. ("Making a Difference") Girl at the 2015 Black Girls Rock! awards show, where she stood onstage alongside Michelle Obama.

Bembry's career was featured in a thesis that surveyed the involvement in political empowerment of contemporary young Black women. Basketball star LeBron James included her work in his series of 2018 Instagram posts highlighting young social influencers.

== Journalism and communication ==
During her college career, Bembry completed summer internships at Sony Music Entertainment and WMAR-TV. After graduating from college in May 2018, she was employed as a Dow Jones & Company Business Reporting Intern for American Banker, a writer for Business Insider, and an intern for ABC World News Tonight with David Muir. She later worked for SHI International Corp, while also continuing to write children's books.

== Bibliography ==
=== Fiction ===
- The Honey Bunch Kids (2010)
- The Honey Bunch Kids: School's in Session, Book 1 (2011)
- The Honey Bunch Kids: School's in Session, Book 2 (2012)
- Desiree Davenport: Welcome to Treeless Park (2020)

=== Reporting ===
- "Tattoos, cellphones and volunteerism: The way to millennials' hearts," American Banker (August 30, 2018)
- "Focus Financial invests $28M in fintech startup, ahead of prospective IPO," Financial Planning (June 22, 2018)
- "What it was like to play Fortnite for the first time," Business Insider (May 27, 2018)
