= Richard A. Pettigrew =

American politician (born 1930)

Dick Pettigrew
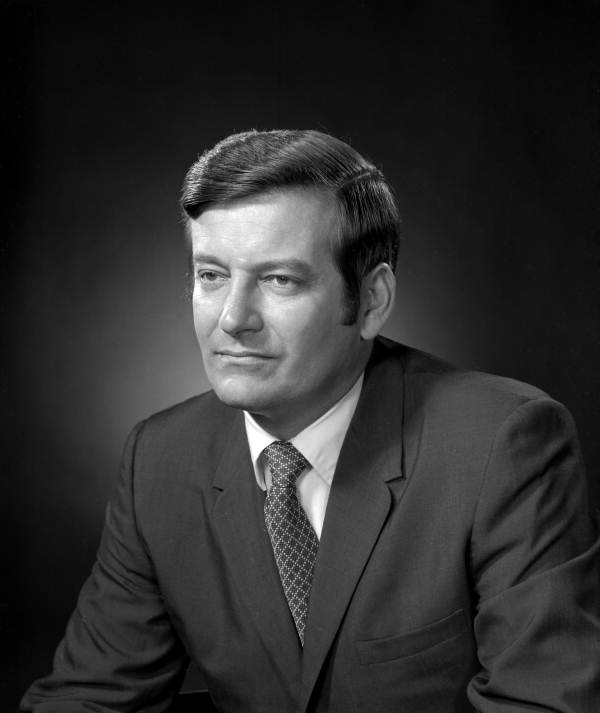

Member of the Florida House of Representatives for the 97th district
- In office 1963–1972

Speaker of the Florida House of Representatives
- In office 1971–1972
- Preceded by: Frederick H. Schultz
- Succeeded by: T. Terrell Sessums

Personal details
- Born: June 10, 1930 (age 95) Charleston, West Virginia
- Party: Democratic
- Occupation: attorney

Richard A. Pettigrew (born June 10, 1930) was an American politician in the state of Florida.

Pettigrew was born in Charleston, West Virginia in 1930, and moved to Florida with his family that same year. He attended the University of Florida and is an attorney. He served in the Florida House of Representatives for the 97th district, as a Democrat, serving from 1963 to 1972. From 1971 to 1972, he was Speaker of the Florida House of Representatives.
