= Florida Gateway College =

Public college in Lake City, Florida, U.S.

Coordinates: 30°10′30″N 82°34′07″W

- Former names: Columbia Forestry School; Lake City Junior College; Forest Ranger School; Lake City Community College
- Motto: Go Further, Together
- Type: Public college
- Established: 1947; 79 years ago
- Parent institution: Florida College System
- Endowment: $18.9 million (2020)
- President: Lawrence Barrett
- Administrative staff: 212
- Students: 4,958 of which 1,203 were Dual Enrollment students (2018)
- Location: Lake City, Florida, U.S.
- Campus: Rural, 132 acres (53 ha)
- Colors: Green & yellow
- Nickname: Timberwolves
- Website: www.fgc.edu

Florida Gateway College (FGC) is a public college in Lake City, Florida, United States. It is part of the Florida College System and one of the institutions in the system designated a "state college", allowing it to offer four-year bachelor's degrees. The institution was established in 1947 as the Columbia Forestry School and it adopted its current name in 2009.

The college is accredited by the Southern Association of Colleges and Schools. The school serves 7,000 students each year from its five-county district, which includes Baker, Columbia, Dixie, Gilchrist and Union counties.

== History ==
At the conclusion of World War II, the Lake City Naval Air Station was decommissioned and the Columbia Forestry School (CFS) was established in 1947, utilizing military structures that remained. At the time, Lake City claimed to be the "Forestry Capitol of the World". The first few years had extremely low enrollment and meager funding, causing the school's president to request help from the Florida Legislature. Instead of providing additional funding, the politicians directed the University of Florida to take over management of the school. Columbia Forestry School became the University of Florida Forest Ranger School in 1950.

Throughout the turbulent 1960s, the school had fewer than 400 students. In 1961, the school was invited to become one of 28 two-year educational facilities in the state's master plan for education as Lake City Junior College. Increased funding allowed wooden buildings to be replaced with brick structures after a fire burned several in 1963. However, a few of the WWII era buildings remained, though mostly unused, until the middle 1970s, when the last one was finally demolished. The "Junior" was dropped and the word, "Community" was placed in the college's name in 1970 to emphasize that the school offered occupational and cultural enrichment education for area residents.

Beginning in 2008, the Florida legislature began granting name changes to any of the 28 public community colleges that requested it. By removing community from their name, or substituting state, the college would be eligible to add bachelor's degree programs on a limited basis. On November 10, 2009, the LCCC Board of Trustees voted 8–1 to change the name of Lake City Community College to Florida Gateway College, effective July 1, 2010. This was the fifth name change in the college's history.

== Campus ==
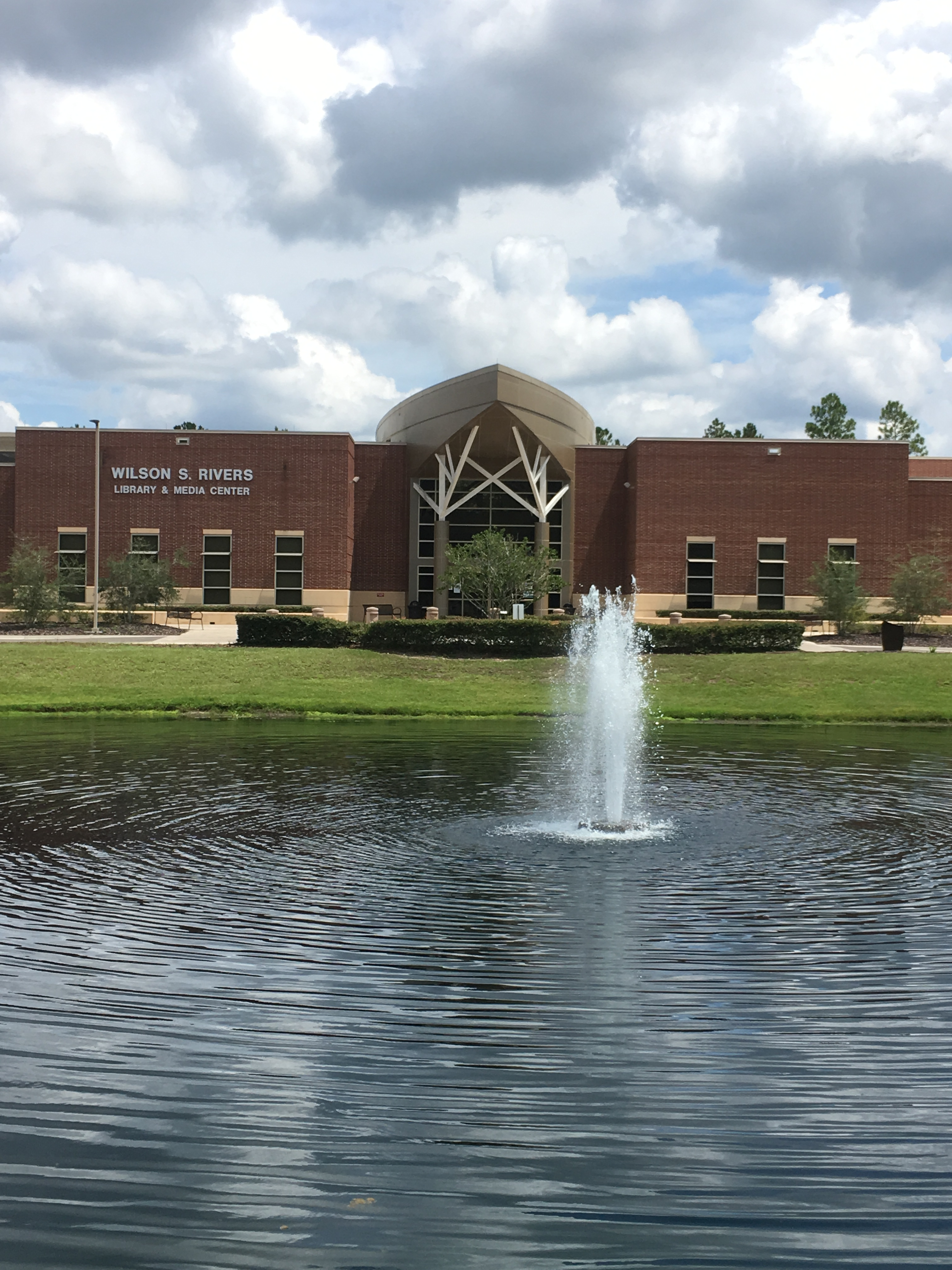
Florida Gateway College campus

FGC occupies 132 acres (53 ha) of natural pinelands, with over twenty-five buildings landscaped with native azalea bushes and crepe myrtle trees. Florida Leader Magazine designated LCCC as the most beautiful college campus in Florida. FGC operates 3 satellite locations (Macclenny, Cross City & Bell) in the surrounding counties included in the college's service area. At these "storefront centers", local residents can attend live classes, take distance learning courses or talk to advisors via the internet and pick up brochures, catalogs, schedules, and forms.

After a ten-year hibernation, Granger Hall re-opened its doors in the fall of 2018 as the 84-student residence hall at Florida Gateway College. It was one of only two community colleges to offer on-campus housing in Florida but was used predominately for students on athletic scholarship.

== Organization and administration ==
FGC is part of the Florida College System and its current president is Lawrence Barrett.

== Academics ==
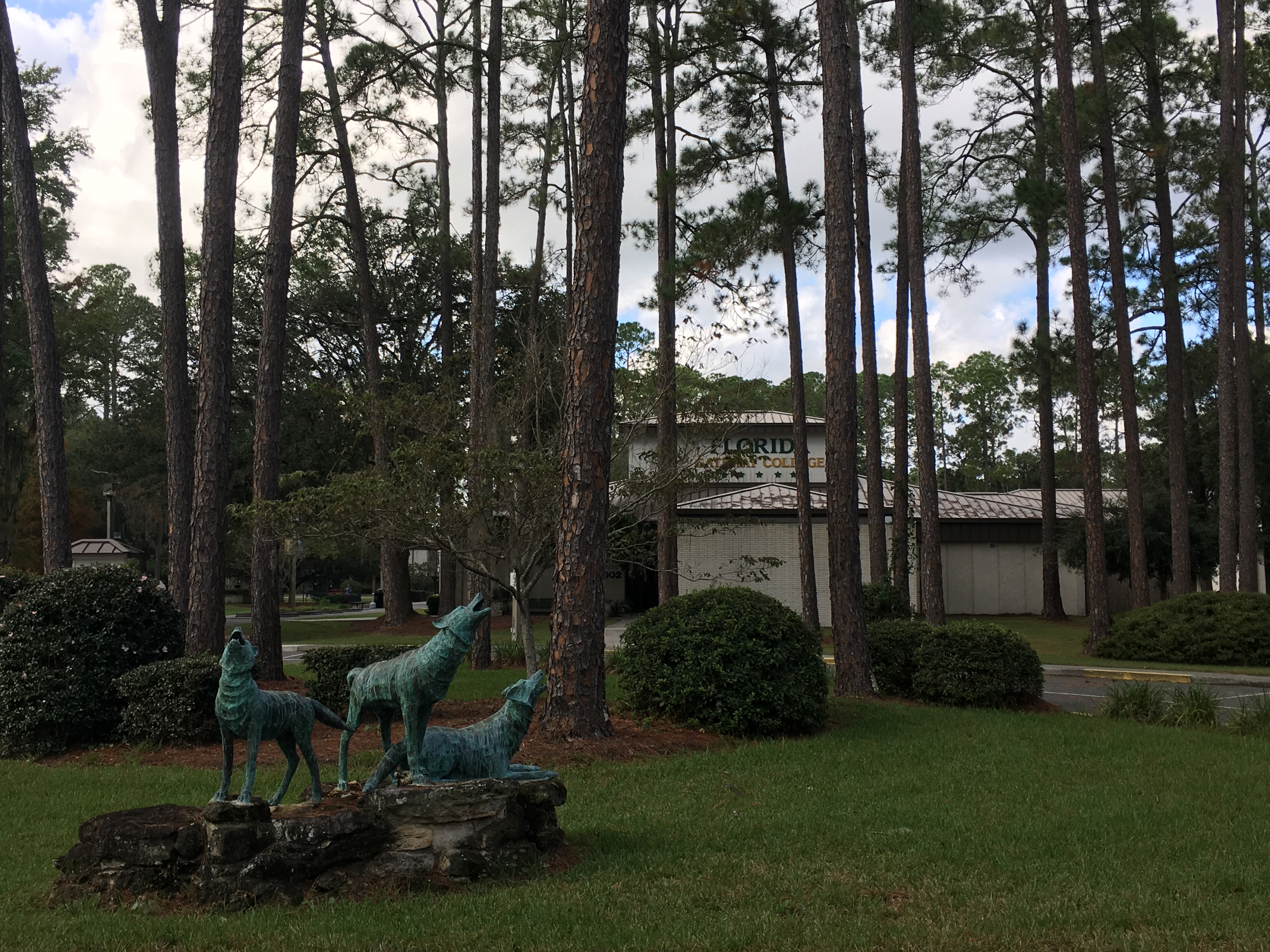
Florida Gateway College campus

A record 947 students graduated from Florida Gateway College in the 2017–2018 school year and enrollment to the college has shown steady growth, with the 2017-2018 year seeing a Headcount Enrollment of 4,958 of which 1,203 are Dual Enrollment students. The school has an open admissions policy for all programs except nursing, golf course operations, and allied health programs.

The majority of students follow the track to earn an Associate of Arts degree for transfer to an upper division school in pursuit of a Bachelor's degree. Students are encouraged to select one of 44 majors with elective courses that will be accepted at their next educational institution.

== Student life ==
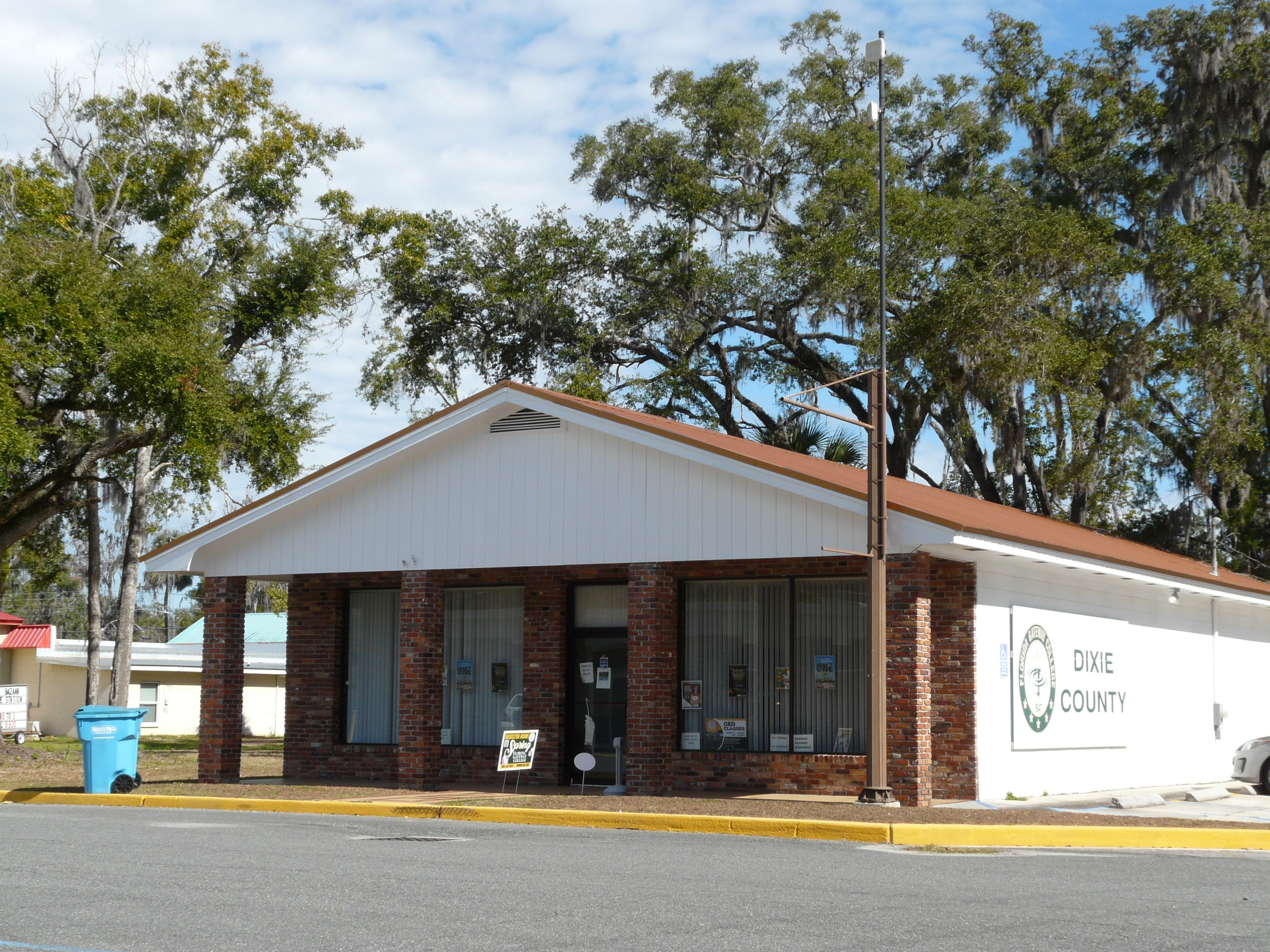
Dixie County branch in Cross City, Florida

=== Collegiate athletics ===
Florida Gateway College resumed athletics in 2017. Women's Volleyball began their first season since 1982 as well as Men's Golf. 2018 Men's Basketball and Women's Cross Country restarted their programs as well. Men's Basketball earned back to back Division II, Region 8 Championship Titles in 2019 and 2020.

There are intramurals in Basketball, Flag Football, Ping Pong, Spades Tournament, Billiards, Volleyball, Soccer and Dodgeball. The college had a competitive intercollegiate athletic history for over 45 years but the program was disbanded in 2008.

The men's basketball program was state runners-up in 1968 and state champions in 1970, the year they placed third in the National Junior College tournament in Hutchinson, Kansas. Joe B. Fields was the coach for 22 years, but the sport was discontinued in 1995.

The women's softball team has eight National Junior College Athletic Association titles:

- Women's Slow Pitch Softball: 1983, 1986, 1987, 1989, 1990, 1992, 1993
- Women's Division I Fast Pitch Softball: 2001

On March 12, 2008, the college announced that at the end of the 2007–2008 school year, the Lake City Community College intercollegiate athletic program would be disbanded. The proposal was made by college president Charles Hall and endorsed by the college board of trustees. The reasons given were financial, including expected reductions in state funding, lower enrollment, program cutbacks after the Florida Department of Corrections withdrew its training courses, athletic dormitory and food service costs and the prospect of making similar cuts in the next school year. The school joined Florida Southwestern State College in Fort Myers, Valencia Community College in Orlando and Florida Keys Community College, near Key West as the only four of Florida's 28 community colleges without an intercollegiate sports program.

== Notable people ==
- Reggie Abercrombie, former Major League Baseball (MLB) outfielder who played for the Florida Marlins (2006–2007) and Houston Astros (2008).
- Chuck Brannan, member of the Florida Legislature representing the state's 10th House district.
- Jerry Carl, U.S. representative for Alabama's 1st congressional district
- Carlos Corporán, a professional baseball catcher who is currently a free agent. He played in the Major League Baseball (MLB) for the Milwaukee Brewers, Houston Astros, and Texas Rangers.
- Lester Fonville, former professional basketball player and 1987 NBA draft selection (29th overall) by the Portland Trail Blazers.
- Don Newman - Former NBA assistant coach of San Antonio Spurs from 2004 to 2012 and former head coach of Arizona State Sun Devils men's basketball. He has won two NBA Championships as a coach and currently assistant coach of Washington Wizards.
- Roberto Pérez- Current MLB catcher for the San Francisco Giants. Pérez is well remembered for hitting two home runs in game one of the 2016 World Series. He attended Florida Gateway College for two years, Pérez was later drafted by the Cleveland Indians in the 33rd round of the 2008 Major League Baseball draft.
- Heath Phillips - Former MLB pitcher for the Kansas City Royals
- Elizabeth W. Porter - Current member of the Florida House of Representatives
- Mike Rebhan, former college baseball pitcher and 1990 College World Series Most Outstanding Player Georgia Bulldogs baseball team.
- Brian Schlitter, former MLB relief pitcher who played for the Chicago Cubs and Oakland Athletics.
- Fain Skinner - former NASCAR driver
- Perry Warbington - Former NBA draft pick and player for the Philadelphia 76ers,
- Bobby Weed, Golf course designer and builder specializing in design, renovation and repurposing.
