= Elizabeth W. Porter =

American politician

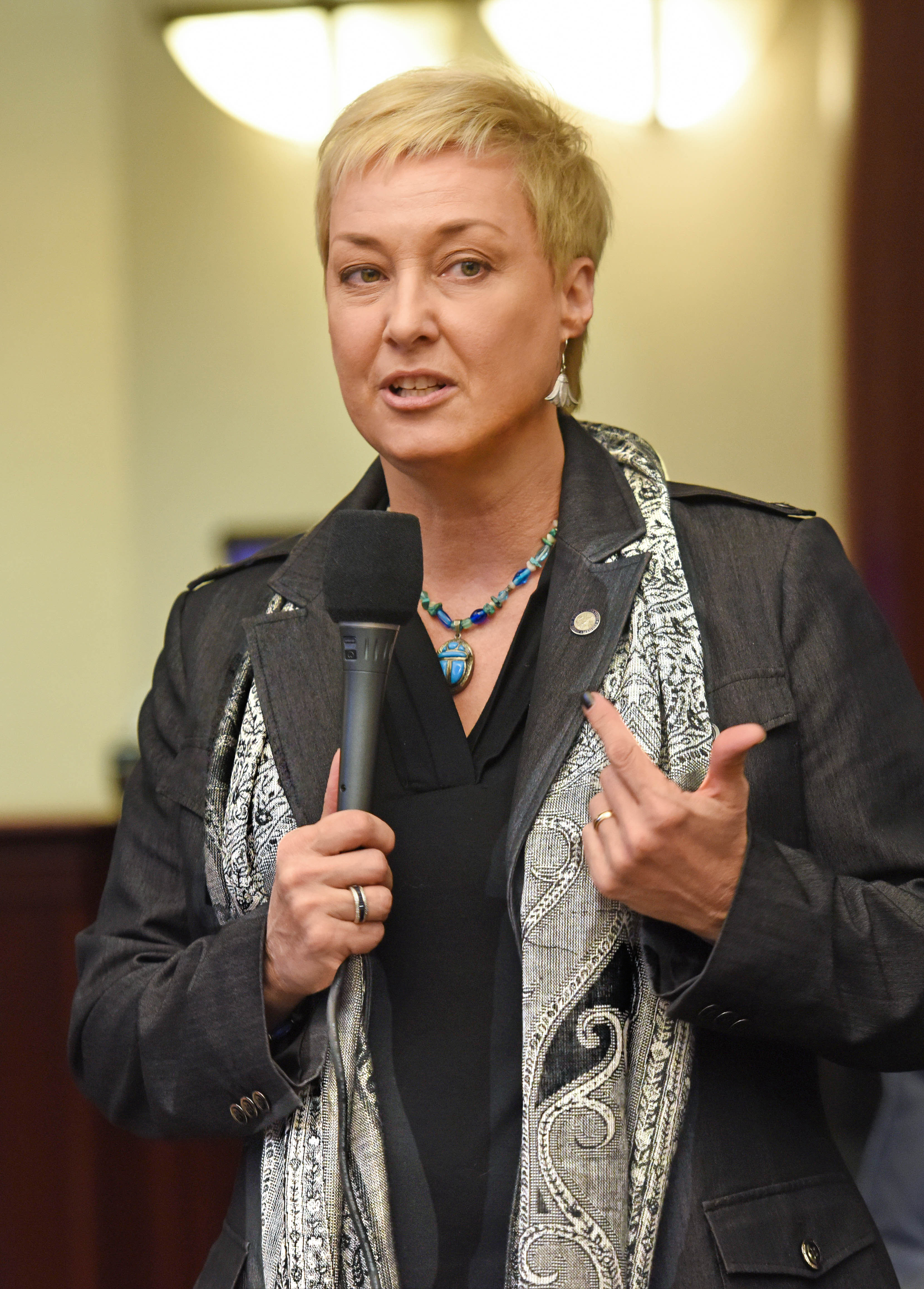

Member of the Florida House of Representatives
- In office November 2, 2010 – November 6, 2018
- Preceded by: Debbie Boyd
- Succeeded by: Chuck Brannan
- Constituency: 11th district (2010–2012); 10th district (2012–2018)

Personal details
- Born: Mary Elizabeth Whiddon November 18, 1964 (age 61) Lake City, Florida
- Party: Republican
- Spouse: Andrew Porter
- Children: Erin, Drew
- Education: Florida Gateway College (A.A.); Florida State University (B.A.)
- Profession: Medical billing and consulting

Elizabeth Whiddon Porter (born November 18, 1964) is a Republican politician and a former member of the Florida House of Representatives. Porter represented the 10th District, which includes Alachua, Baker, Columbia, Hamilton, and Suwannee Counties, from 2012 to 2018, previously representing the 11th District from 2010 to 2012.

== Biography ==
Porter was born in Lake City, Florida, and attended Lake City Community College, from which she received her associates degree. After graduation, she was a student at Florida State University, where she graduated with a degree in communications. Following graduation, she worked in medical billing and consulting. Porter was elected to the Columbia County Commission, and served as the Chairwoman of the commission.

== Florida House of Representatives ==
In 2008, Porter ran for the Florida House of Representatives as a Republican in the 11th District, which included Alachua, Columbia, Dixie, Gilchrist, Lafayette, and Suwannee Counties, against incumbent Democratic State Representative Debbie Boyd. Porter narrowly lost to Boyd by 179 votes, prompting an automatic recount, which upheld Boyd's victory. In 2010, Porter ran against Boyd again, winning the Republican nomination against Paul Watson, Terry Rauch, and Charles E. Underhill. She faced Boyd and Tea Party candidate John Ferentinos in the general election, and campaigned on her opposition to the Patient Protection and Affordable Care Act and her support for a Florida version of Arizona SB 1070. Porter ended up winning the election, receiving 54% of the vote to Boyd's 40% and Ferentinos's 6%.

In 2012, when the Florida House of Representatives districts were reconfigured, Porter was drawn into the 10th District, which included most of her former territory from the 11th District, as well as her home in Columbia County. She was unopposed in both the primary and general elections and won re-election.

In 2016, Porter faced democrat Jerry Lawrence Bullard in the general election garnering 64.3% of the vote to Bullard's 35.7%.

Porter served as the House Higher Education Subcommittee Chair from 2014 to 2016 appointed by Speaker Crisafulli. After the 2016 election cycle, Speaker Richard Corcoran appointed Porter to chair the House Post-Secondary Subcommittee

While in the legislature, Porter supported the Career and Professional Education (CAPE) Act, which would "allow students to meet their high school graduation requirements with classes that are relevant to their future careers," noting that, under the legislation, "the forgotten half we left behind" would benefit from the changes. She also supported reform in other areas relating to education, namely, high school sports, favoring legislation written by fellow State Representative Larry Metz that "strips power away from the Florida High School Athletic Association," as she declared, "It's about time someone reined in the power and the abuse of power by the FHSAA."

Porter has been outspoken against gun control laws and as of October, 2017, had a 100% rating from the NRA During 2018 Legislative Session while debating an amendment to HB 7026, the Marjory Stoneman Douglas Student Protection bill, Porter argued against the amendment, that included banning certain weapons, "We've been told we need to listen to the children and do what the children ask. Are there any children on this floor? Are there any children making laws? Do we allow the children to tell us that we should pass a law that says, 'No homework'? Or 'You finish high school at the age of 12' just because they want it so? No. The adults make the laws because we have the age. We have the wisdom. And we have the experience." This was seen by some as demeaning and belittling the experience of the Marjory Stoneman Douglas H.S. students who had survived the shooting at their school.

Porter did vote for the final version of HB 7026, the Marjory Stoneman Douglas Student Protection Act.
