= Wellborn, Florida =

- Unincorporated community
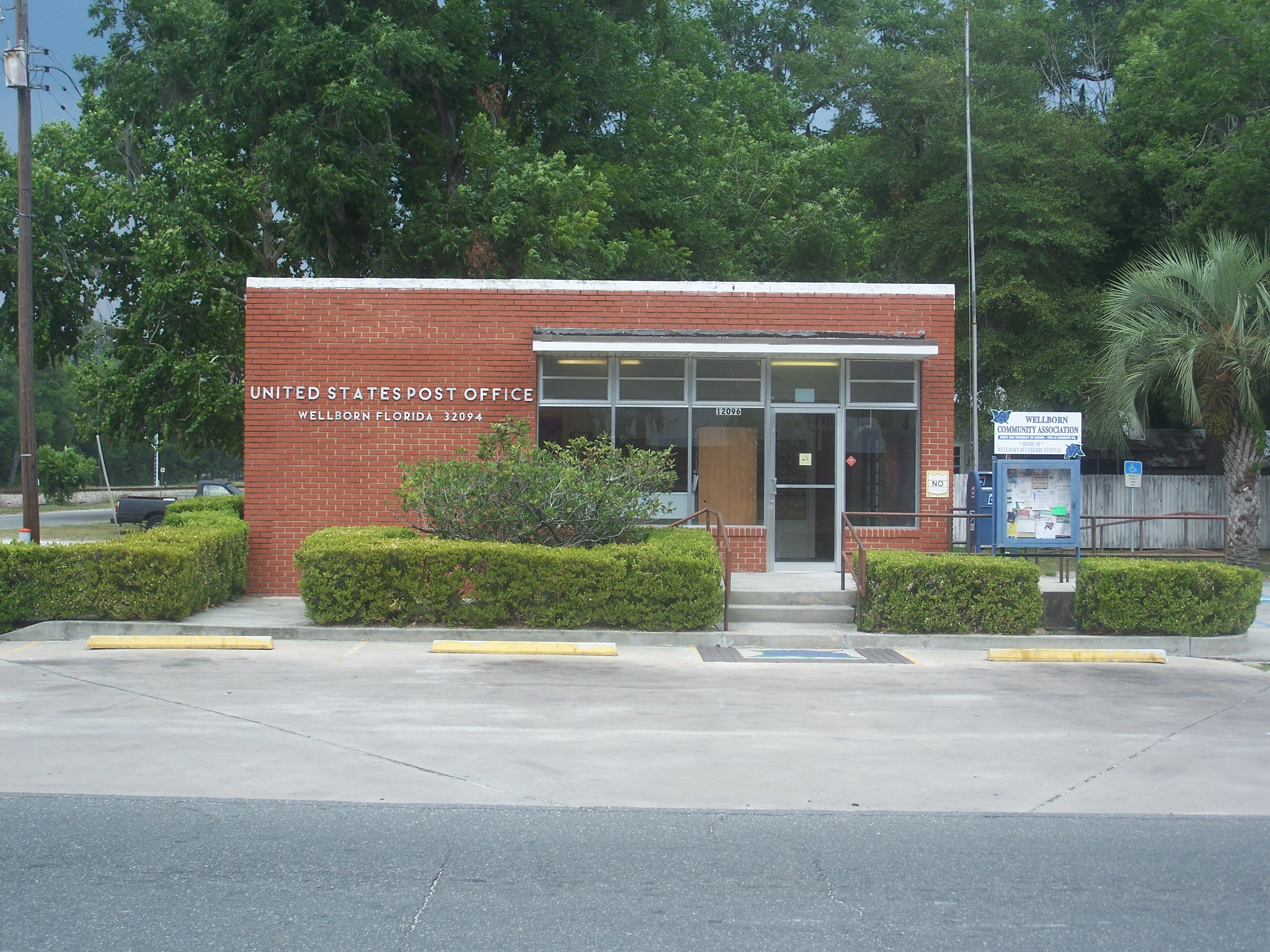
- Post office

- Location within Florida
- Coordinates: 30°13′52″N 82°49′10″W
- Country: United States
- State: Florida
- County: Suwannee
- Elevation: 190 ft (58 m)

Population (2010)
  - Total: 2,724
- Time zone: UTC-5 (Eastern (EST))
  - Summer (DST): UTC-4 (EDT)
- ZIP code: 32094
- Area code: 386
- GNIS feature ID: 293018

Wellborn is an unincorporated community in Suwannee County, Florida, United States. Wellborn is located near U.S. Route 90 (State Road 10), 11 miles (18 km) east-southeast of Live Oak. It also includes County Roads 137 and 250. Wellborn has a post office with ZIP code 32094.

Wellborn was established as a town in 1860. In the 1800s there were many family farms and orchards established around Wellborn. The McClellan family had a Plantation just south of Wellborn in the 1830s. Their home was a stagecoach stop. All that remains of the McClellan Plantation is the old family cemetery, with many graves dating from before the Civil War. Today Wellborn has many historic homes and stores dating from the late 1800s and early 1900s.
