= Billy Joe Rish =

American politician (1932–2008)

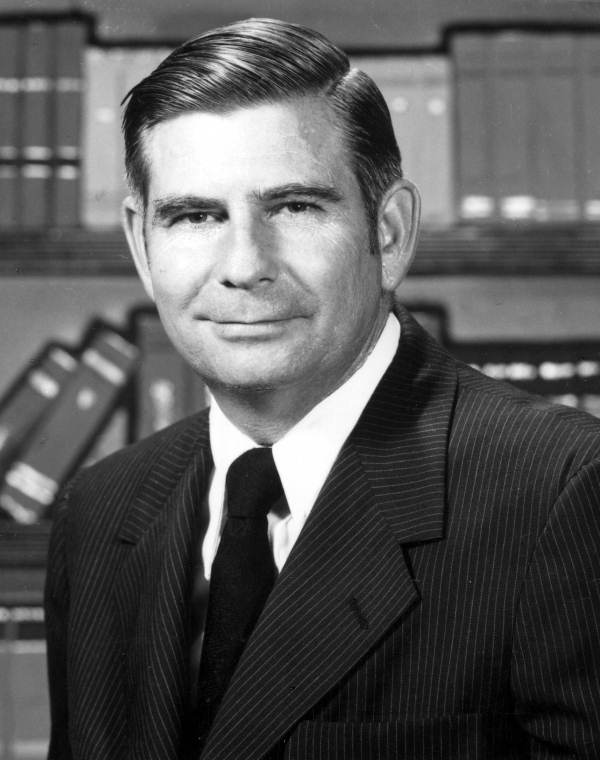
- Rish in 1974

Member of the Florida House of Representatives from the 8th district
- In office 1970–1972
- Preceded by: John Robert Middlemas
- Succeeded by: Earl Hutto

Member of the Florida House of Representatives from the 9th district
- In office 1972–1978
- Preceded by: Joe Chapman
- Succeeded by: Leonard Hall

Personal details
- Born: September 10, 1932 Wewahitchka, Florida, U.S.
- Died: May 17, 2008 (aged 75)
- Party: Democratic
- Spouse: Carol Thompson
- Education: University of Florida; University of Florida Levin College of Law

Billy Joe Rish (September 10, 1932 – May 17, 2008) was an American politician. He served as a Democratic member for the 8th and 9th district of the Florida House of Representatives.

== Life and career ==
Rish was born in Wewahitchka, Florida, the son of Lucy and Roy P. Rish. He attended Wewahitchka High School, the University of Florida and the University of Florida Levin College of Law.

In 1970, Rish was elected to represent the 8th district of the Florida House of Representatives, succeeding John Robert Middlemas. He served until 1972, when he was succeeded by Earl Hutto. In the same year, he was elected to represent the 9th district, succeeding Joe Chapman. He served until 1978, when he was succeeded by Leonard Hall.

Rish died in May 2008, at the age of 75.
