= Ashenafi =

Ashenafi (Amharic: አሸናፊ) is an Ethiopian Amharic name that may refer to

- Ashenafi Bekele, Ethiopian football manager
- Ashenafi Kebede (1938–1998), Ethiopian composer, conductor, musicologist and music educator
- Girma Ashenafi (born 1982), Ethiopian football player
- Meaza Ashenafi (born 1964), Ethiopian lawyer
- Senait Ashenafi (born 1966), Ethiopian-born actress
- Tewodros Ashenafi (born 1969), Ethiopian entrepreneur
