= The Children's Movement of Florida =

The Children’s Movement of Florida is a citizen-led, non-partisan non-profit organization to educate political, business and civic leaders – and all parents of the state – about the need to prioritize the well-being and education of infants, toddlers and all other children in Florida. The Children's Movement of Florida was launched on August 9, 2010 (14 years ago), in a four-city fly-around with press conferences in Miami, Orlando, St. Petersburg and Tallahassee.

The Children's Movement of Florida logo

== Core advocacy issues ==
The Children's Movement of Florida has identified five areas for a first focus of special interest and action:

- Access to quality health care
- Screening and treatment for children with special needs
- Quality pre-kindergarten opportunities
- High-quality mentoring programs
- High-quality support and information for parents

== "Milk Parties" ==
The movement has scheduled 15 "Milk Party" rallies from September 6 to 30, starting in Pensacola to Key West, to rally support for children as a priority. Participants will be treated to milk and cookies. "Milk Parties" will feature notable speakers, local celebrities, an educational video, and a "call to action". The Children's Movement of Florida aims for a thousand or more citizens at each event.

Several Florida publications have referred to The Children's Movement of Florida as the "Milk Party".

== Leadership ==
The Children's Movement of Florida is led by a 27-member steering committee consisting of business, civic and political leaders from across Florida. Some notable members of 27-member coalition are:

- Carol Jenkins Barnett: President of Publix Supermarket Charities and daughter of George W. Jenkins.
- Sam Bell: Former Florida legislator.
- Allan Bense: Former Florida House Speaker.
- Bob Butterworth: Former Florida attorney general and secretary of the Department of Children and Families.
- Betty Castor: Former Florida legislator and president of the University of South Florida.
- Scott Clemons: Former legislator and now mayor of Panama City, Florida.
- Manny Diaz: Twice elected mayor of Miami.
- Pegeen Hanrahan: Former mayor of Gainesville.
- Toni Jennings: Former lieutenant governor of Florida.
- David Lawrence Jr.: Former publisher of The Miami Herald.
- Roberto Martinez: Former U.S. attorney and now on the State Board of Education.
- Jon Mills: Former Florida House Speaker.
- Sandra Murman: Former Florida legislator from Hillsborough County
- John P. Quinones: Former Florida legislator and now member of the Osceola Board of County Commissioners.
- Nan Rich: Florida state senator.
- Burt Saunders: Former Florida legislator from Collier County.
- Bill Sublette: Former Florida legislator.
