= Joseph Chapman =

Joseph Chapman may refer to:

- Joseph Chapman (academic), English academic administrator
- Joseph Chapman (actor), American film and television actor
- Joseph John Chapman (1784–1849), early California resident
- Joe Chapman (squash player) (born 1990), squash player from British Virgin Islands
- Joe Chapman (politician), member of the Florida House of Representatives
- Joseph A. Chapman (born 1942), president of North Dakota State University
- Union Jack (Joseph Chapman), third incarnation of Marvel Comics Union Jack
