= James Harold Thompson =

American politician

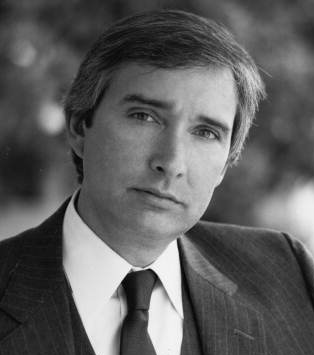

Member of the Florida House of Representatives from the 10th district
- In office November 5, 1974 – November 2, 1982
- Preceded by: Pat Thomas
- Succeeded by: Herb Morgan

Member of the Florida House of Representatives from the 8th district
- In office November 2, 1982 – November 4, 1986
- Preceded by: Ron Johnson
- Succeeded by: Robert Trammell

Speaker of the Florida House of Representatives
- In office 1985–1986

Personal details
- Born: November 10, 1944 (age 81) Mobile, Alabama
- Party: Democratic
- Occupation: Attorney

James Harold Thompson (born November 10, 1944) was an American politician in the state of Florida.

Thompson was born in Mobile, Alabama. He moved to Florida in 1945 with his family, and later attended Florida State University, earning a Juris Doctor degree. He is an attorney. He served in the Florida House of Representatives in the 10th district from November 5, 1974, to November 2, 1982, and the 8th district from November 2, 1982, to November 4, 1986. From 1985 to 1986, he was Speaker of the Florida House of Representatives.

In 1992, Gov. Lawton Chiles appointed Thompson to lead a committee reviewing the Growth Management Act.
