= Curtis Richardson =

American politician

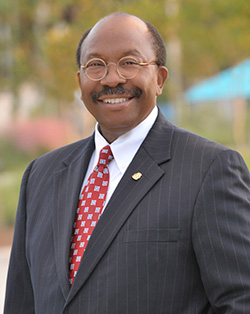

Member of the Tallahassee City Commission, Seat 2
- Incumbent
- Assumed office November 21, 2014
- Preceded by: Andrew Gillum

Member of the Florida House of Representatives from the 8th district
- In office November 7, 2000 – November 4, 2008
- Preceded by: Al Lawson
- Succeeded by: Alan Williams

Personal details
- Born: October 8, 1956 (age 69) Jacksonville, Florida, U.S.
- Party: Democratic
- Spouse: Nina Ashenafi
- Children: 2
- Education: Florida State University (BS, MS); University of West Florida (MA)

Curtis B. Richardson (born October 8, 1956, Jacksonville, Florida) is an American elected official, who has been a member of the Tallahassee City Commission since 2014. He previously served for eight years in the Florida House of Representatives, representing parts of Gadsden and Leon Counties from 2000 to 2008.

== Early life and education ==
Richardson was born in Jacksonville, Florida and raised in nearby Green Cove Springs, Florida. He earned B.S. in Psychology from the Florida State University in 1978, an M.A. in Counseling Psychology from the University of West Florida in 1979, and an M.S. in School Psychology from Florida State University in 1983.

== Career ==
=== Early career ===
He worked as a school psychologist in the Gadsden County public school system for ten years, until he joined the staff of Florida Education Commissioner Betty Castor in 1991. He subsequently worked in Governor Lawton Chiles' office for several years, and then as a consultant for the University of South Florida. In 2010, he returned to work at the Gadsden public schools, as Director of School Improvement.

=== Politics ===
In 1990, Richardson was elected to the Leon County School Board. He served on the board until 1996, when he ran for a seat on the Leon County Commission. He lost in the Democratic primary to Bill Proctor.

Four years later, Richardson ran for the Tallahassee- and Gadsden County-based Florida House of Representatives seat being vacated by Al Lawson, who was running for the Florida Senate. Richardson was elected, and served four terms until he was term-limited in 2008. In 2010, when Lawson was term-limited from the Senate, Richardson ran his seat, but was defeated in the Democratic primary to former Leon Schools Superintendent Bill Montford, 55 to 45%.

In August 2014, Richardson won a special election to the Tallahassee City Commission. The seat became vacant when then-commissioner Andrew Gillum resigned to run for mayor. Richardson was re-elected in 2016.

In 2024 Richardson said he would not support a ballot initiative to legalize recreational marijuana in Florida. He also voted against a Commission Resolution in 2021 that urged Florida lawmakers to protect abortion rights.

== Personal life ==
Richardson lives in Tallahassee, Florida with his wife, Nina Ashenafi Richardson, a county judge and former president of the Tallahassee Bar Association. The couple have two daughters, Carina and Aida. Ashenafi Richardson is the daughter of the Ethiopian composer, ethnomusicologist, and educator, Dr. Ashenafi Kebede and is the sister of the actress Senait Ashenafi.
