= Alan Williams (Florida politician) =

American politician

Alan B. Williams
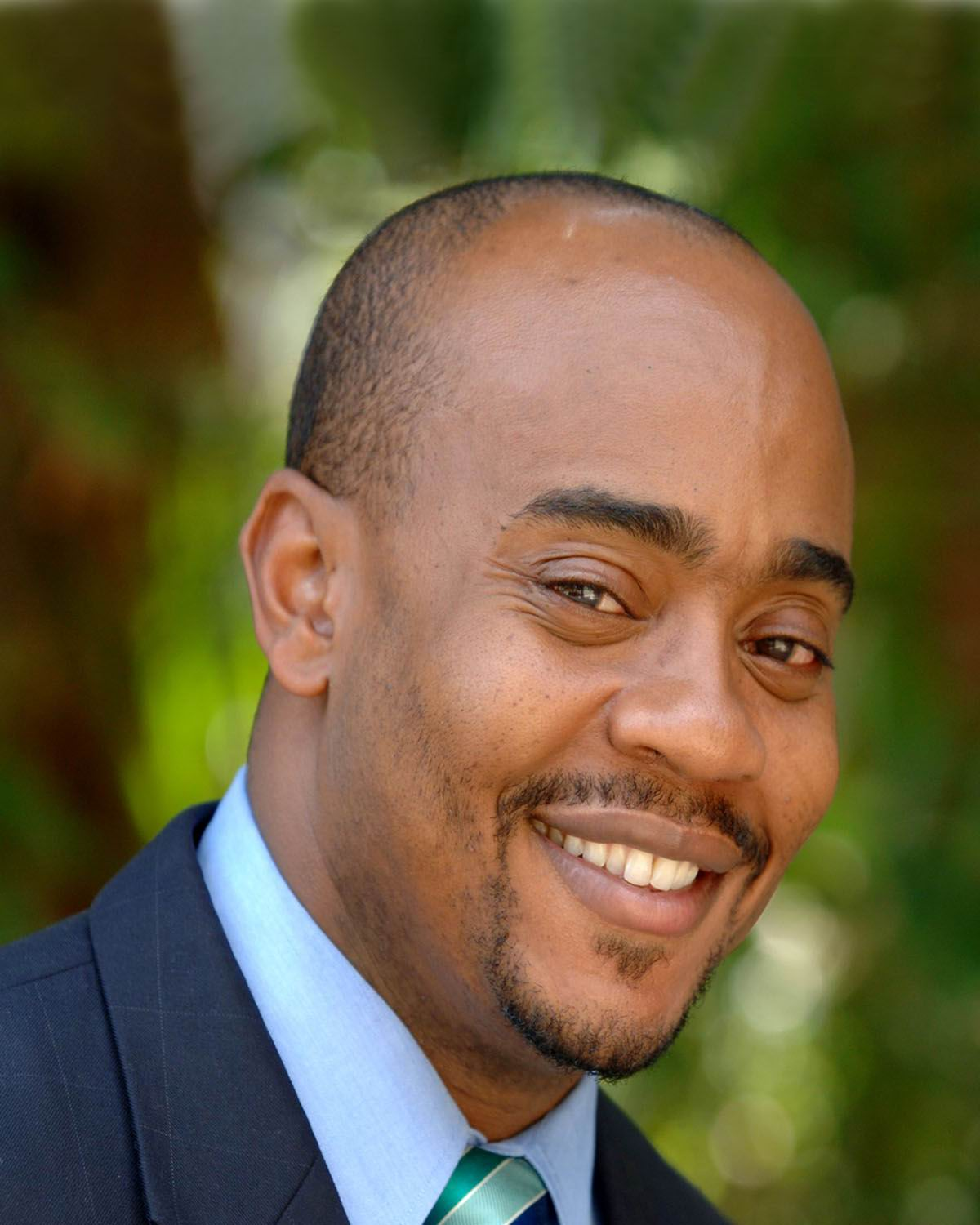

Member of the Florida House of Representatives from the 8th district
- In office November 4, 2008 – November 8, 2016
- Preceded by: Curtis Richardson
- Succeeded by: Ramon Alexander

Personal details
- Born: March 22, 1975 (age 51) Tallahassee, Florida
- Party: Democratic
- Children: 3 children
- Education: Florida A&M University (B.S.) (M.B.A.)
- Profession: Business consultant

Alan B. Williams (born March 22, 1975) is a Democratic politician from the U.S. state of Florida. He served in the Florida House of Representatives from 2008 to 2016, representing a district based in Gadsden County and Tallahassee in Leon County. Williams is currently deputy assistant secretary of housing and urban development for congressional and intergovernmental relations.

== History ==
Williams was born in Tallahassee, and attended Florida A&M University, where he graduated with a Bachelor's degree in 1998, and a Master of Business Administration in 2003. After graduation, he began working for Sprint Nextel in sales, but quit to work as a community outreach aide for John Marks, the Mayor of Tallahassee.

== Florida House of Representatives ==
In 2008, following the inability of State Representative Curtis Richardson to seek re-election due to term limits, Williams ran to succeed him in the Democratic primary in the 8th District, which included northern Gadsden County and parts of Tallahassee in Leon County. He defeated Carolyn Roberson, Rudy Maloy, Sean Shaw, Anthony Viegbesie, Hubert R. Brown and Rodney S. Moore in a crowded primary with 41% of the vote. Williams encountered independent candidate Robert Maddox in a landslide, winning 84% of the vote. He was re-elected without opposition in 2010.

Following the reconfiguration of Florida House districts, the redrawn 8th District included most of the territory that Williams had previously represented, but now included all of Gadsden County in exchange for fewer sections of Leon County. He was unopposed in both the Democratic primary and the general election, and won his third term entirely uncontested.

While serving in the legislature, Williams strongly supported legislation that would expand early voting opportunities, despite viewing it as a less-than-perfect bill, declaring "Let's make this state we are proud of from the elections standpoint. We want to make sure no one is standing in line at three in the morning when the president has already been announced the winner." Additionally, following the passage of the budget, which gave state workers a raise from $1,000 to $1,400, Williams praised it as benefitting his constituents, noting, "When you think about North Florida, state government is the life blood of our area. A lot of individuals work at a number of different facilities, whether it's in corrections or here in Tallahassee." Additionally, Williams attempted to serve in a leadership role for the 2014–2016 term, when State Representative Darryl Rouson, who was set to become the Florida House Democrats' leader for the 2014-2016 session, was ousted by the caucus. Williams ran to be the floor leader in Rouson's place, but was defeated by Mark Pafford in a 29–12 vote.

In 2014, Williams was challenged in the Democratic primary by Dianne Williams-Cox, a retired state employee. Williams-Cox argued that he had used his time in office to advance his own interests rather than those of his constituents, while he criticized Williams-Cox for lacking the requisite experience to serve in the legislature. Williams campaigned on his support for giving state employees raises and for increasing access to online voter registration. He ended up defeating Williams-Cox handily, winning 68% of the vote to her 32%. In the general election, Williams faced only write-in opposition, and won his fourth and final term in the legislature with nearly 100% of the vote.

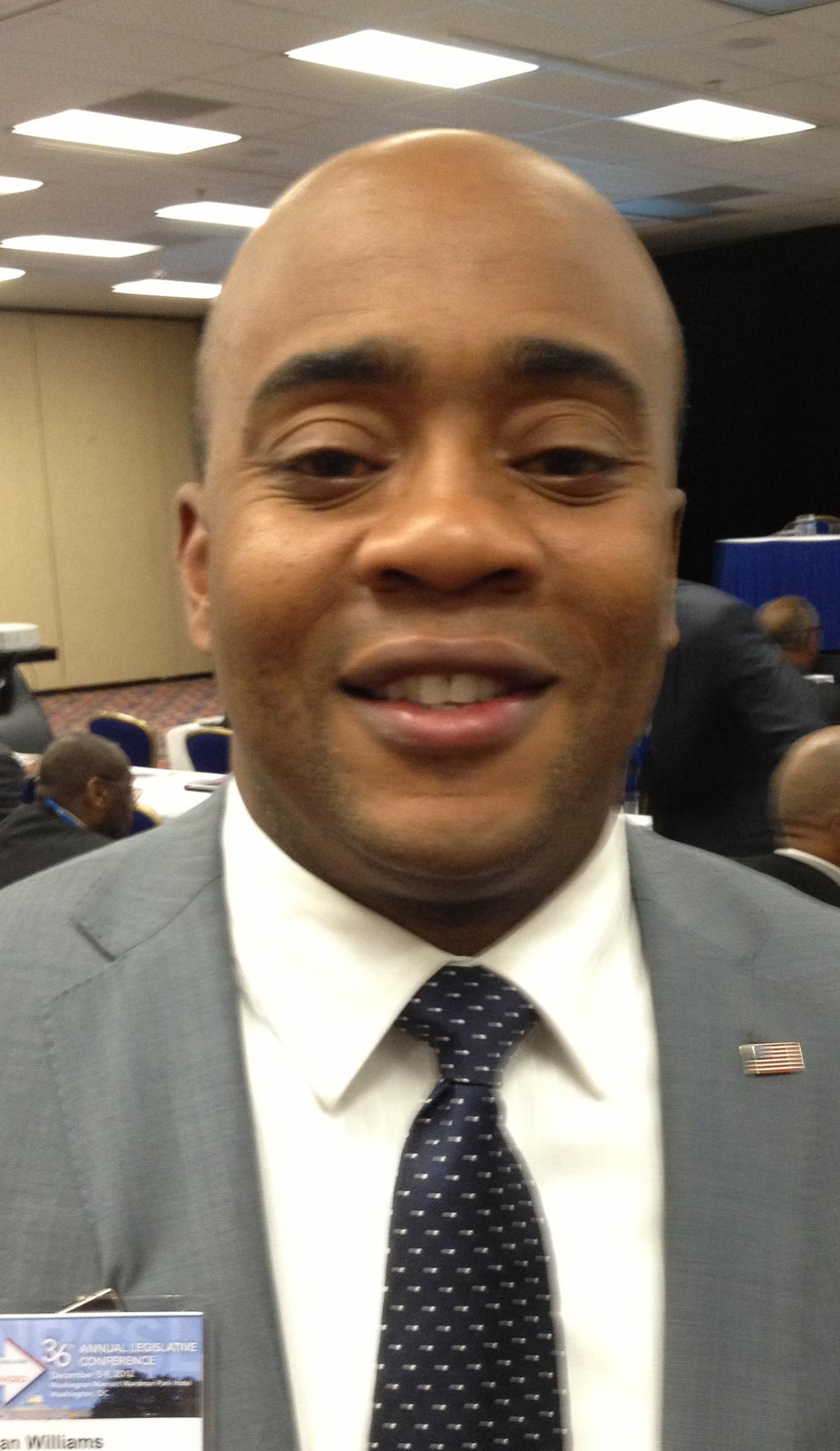
Williams at a conference sponsored by the National Black Caucus of State Legislators in Washington, D.C.
