= Ben Clarence Williams =

American politician

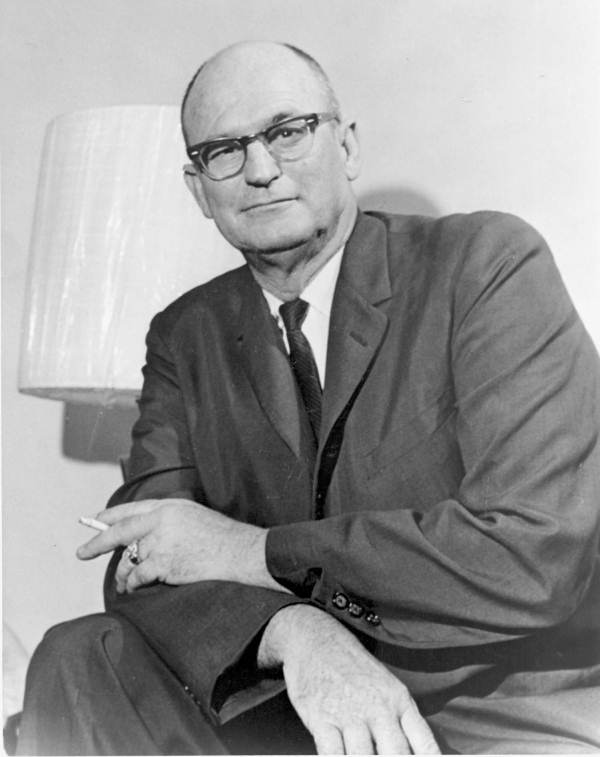
- Williams in 1962

Member of the Florida House of Representatives from Gulf County
- In office 1962–1966

Member of the Florida House of Representatives from Bay–Gulf
- In office 1966–1967

Member of the Florida House of Representatives from the 9th district
- In office 1967–1968
- Preceded by: District established
- Succeeded by: Joe Chapman

Personal details
- Born: May 5, 1914 Port St. Joe, Florida, U.S.
- Died: May 1970 (aged 56)
- Party: Democratic

Ben Clarence Williams (May 5, 1914 – May 1970) was an American politician who served as a Democratic member for the 9th district of the Florida House of Representatives.

== Biography ==
Williams was born in Port St. Joe, Florida. He was an electrician.

In 1962, Williams was elected to the Florida House of Representatives. In 1967, he was elected as the first representative for the newly-established 9th district. He served until 1968, when he was succeeded by Joe Chapman.

Williams died in May 1970, at the age of 56.
