= Florida's 9th House of Representatives district =

American legislative district

Florida's 9th State House of Representatives district
Representative
Allison Tant; D–Tallahassee
- Demographics: 76.9% White; 16.3% Black; 5.0% Hispanic; 3.6% Asian; 0.3% Native American; 0.2% Hawaiian/Pacific Islander; 0.9% Other
- Population (2010) • Voting age: 156,370; 124,130

Florida's 9th House district elects one member of the Florida House of Representatives. The district is represented by Allison Tant. The district is located in the Florida Panhandle, and encompasses part of the Big Bend. The district covers the western half of Leon County. The largest city in the district is Tallahassee, though this district only encompasses the downtown and northwestern portions of the city. As of the 2010 Census, the district's population is 158,781.

This district is covers most of downtown Tallahassee and the northern Tallahassee metropolitan area, giving it a large college and urban population. This has trended the district Democratic, with the last Republican to compete in the district losing in 2016 by 12%.

This district contains Florida State University, located in Tallahassee. The district also contains the Florida State Capitol.

== Representatives from 1967 to the present ==
Representatives by party affiliation
Party	Representatives
Democratic	11

#	Name	Term of service	Residence	Political party
1	Ben Clarence Williams	1967–1968	Port St. Joe	Democratic
2	Joe Chapman	1968–1972	Panama City	Democratic
3	Billy Joe Rish	1972–1978	Port St. Joe	Democratic
4	Leonard Hall	1978–1982	Panama City	Democratic
5	Al Lawson	1982–1992	Tallahassee	Democratic
6	Hurley Rudd	1992–1994	Tallahassee	Democratic
7	Marjorie Turnbull	1994–2000	Tallahassee	Democratic
8	Loranne Ausley	2000–2008	Tallahassee	Democratic
9	Michelle Rehwinkel Vasilinda	2008–2016	Tallahassee	Democratic (Note: Vasilinda was elected as a Democrat, but switched to independent in 2016.)
10	Loranne Ausley	2016–2020	Tallahassee	Democratic
10	Allison Tant	2020–present	Tallahassee	Democratic

== See also ==
- Florida's 3rd Senate district
- Florida's 2nd congressional district
- Florida's 5th congressional district
