= Florida's 8th House of Representatives district =

American legislative district

Florida's 8th State House of Representatives district
Representative
Gallop Franklin; D–Tallahassee
- Demographics: 40.0% White; 52.9% Black; 7.3% Hispanic; 1.7% Asian; 0.3% Native American; 0.1% Hawaiian/Pacific Islander; 2.9% Other
- Population (2010) • Voting age: 155,921; 125,293

Florida's 8th House district elects one member of the Florida House of Representatives. The district is represented by Gallop Franklin. The district is located in the Florida panhandle, and encompasses part of the Big Bend. The district covers all of Gadsden County, as well as central Leon County. The largest city in the district is state capital Tallahassee, though this district excludes the downtown and northeastern portions of the city. As of the 2010 census, the district's population is 156,188. This district is majority-minority.

This district covers part of the eastern panhandle, including the heavily African-American population in Gadsden County and the college population in the Tallahassee metropolitan area. As a result, it has skewed heavily Democratic, with Republicans almost never contesting it.

This district contains Florida A&M University, Tallahassee Community College, and a campus of Flagler College, all located in Tallahassee. The district also contains Tallahassee International Airport.

James Harold Thompson served as the Speaker of the Florida House of Representatives from 1984 until 1986.

== Representatives from 1967 to the present ==
Representatives by party affiliation
Party	Representatives
Democratic	11

#	Name	Term of service	Residence	Political party
1	John Robert Middlemas	1967–1970	Panama City	Democratic
2	Billy Joe Rish	1970–1972	Port St. Joe	Democratic
3	Earl Hutto	1972–1978	Panama City	Democratic
4	Ron Johnson	1978–1982	Panama City	Democratic
5	James Harold Thompson	1982–1986	Quincy	Democratic
6	Robert Trammell	1986–1992	Marianna	Democratic
7	Al Lawson	1992–2000	Tallahassee	Democratic
8	Curtis Richardson	2000–2008	Tallahassee	Democratic
9	Alan Williams	2008–2016	Tallahassee	Democratic
10	Ramon Alexander	2016–2022	Tallahassee	Democratic
10	Gallop Franklin	2022–present	Tallahassee	Democratic

== See also ==
- Florida's 3rd Senate district
- Florida's 5th congressional district
