= John Robert Middlemas =

American politician (1936–2025)

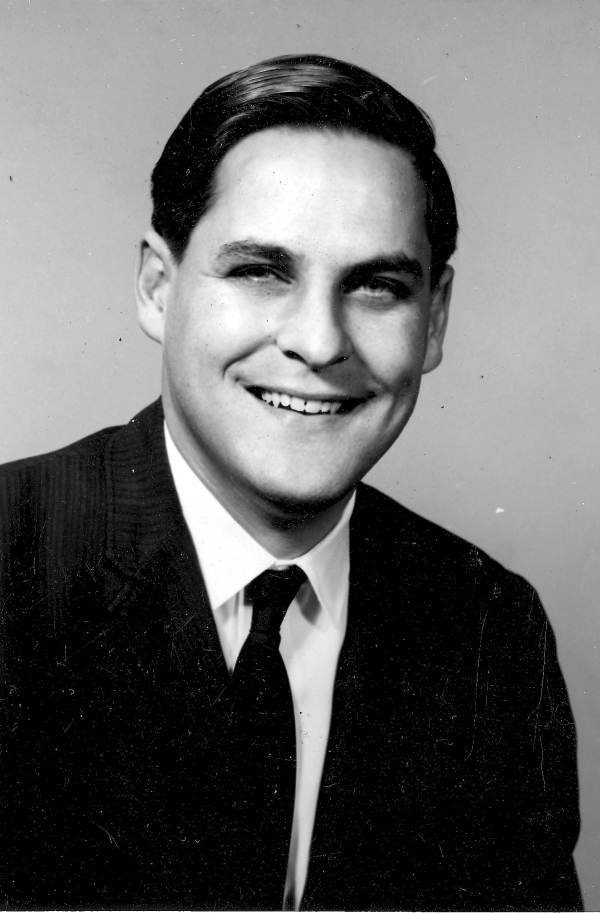
- Middlemas in 1966

Member of the Florida House of Representatives from the 8th district
- In office 1967–1970
- Preceded by: District established
- Succeeded by: Billy Joe Rish

Member of the Florida House of Representatives from the Bay–Gulf–Calhoun district
- In office 1966–1967

Personal details
- Born: July 4, 1936 Panama City, Florida, U.S.
- Died: August 1, 2025 (aged 89)
- Party: Democratic
- Education: Emory University

John Robert Middlemas (July 4, 1936 – August 1, 2025) was an American politician. He served as a Democratic member for the 8th district of the Florida House of Representatives.

== Life and career ==
Middlemas was born in Panama City, Florida on July 4, 1936. He attended Emory University.

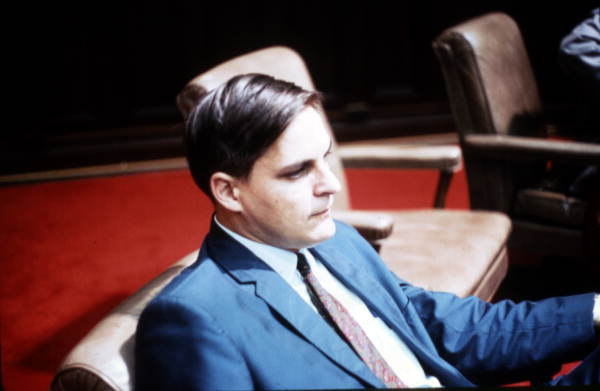
Middlemas in 1970

In 1966, Middlemas was elected to the Florida House of Representatives. The next year, he was elected as the first representative for the newly established 8th district. He served until 1970, when he was succeeded by Billy Joe Rish.

Middlemas died on August 1, 2025, at the age of 89.
