= Saving Freedom =

Saving Freedom: Truman, The Cold War, and the Fight for Western Civilization
- First edition cover
- Author: Joe Scarborough
- Cover artist: Milan Bozic and Pictures Now/Alamy Stock Photo
- Language: English
- Subject: Harry Truman's role in rebuilding Western Europe and checking the spread of communism in the aftermath of WWII
- Genre: Nonfiction
- Publisher: HarperCollins
- Publication date: November 24, 2020
- Publication place: United States
- Media type: Print (hardback)
- Pages: 257
- ISBN: 978-006-295-0512
- Preceded by: The Right Path; The Last Hope; Rome Wasn't Burnt in a Day

Saving Freedom: Truman, The Cold War, and the Fight for Western Civilization, the fourth book by MSNBC Cable news host and former U.S. Representative Joe Scarborough, recounts the historic forces that navigated Harry Truman to begin America's historic battle against the threat of Soviet Communism and how a little known president built an enduring coalition that would use the Truman Doctrine to guide American foreign policy for close to half a century.

== Synopsis ==
In the midst of a Greek Civil War which pitted free Greek forces against a Communist insurgency, President Harry S. Truman addressed Congress on March 12, 1947, to define an historic policy to contain and control the spread of Soviet communism. The policy would soon become known worldwide as the Truman Doctrine, and pledged that the United States would “support free peoples who are resisting attempted subjugation by armed minorities or by outside pressures.” Truman's new doctrine was a groundbreaking departure from a century and half of American isolationism. Ultimately, the Truman Doctrine would signal the beginning of a new American role that would ultimately guarantee the freedom of Western Europe, and witness the rise of the "American Century", a historical period of American strength that would result in the collapse of the Soviet Union in the 1990s.

Initial opposition to the Truman Doctrine was strong from traditionally isolationist Republicans and liberal Democrats, who were critical of a plan that would send aid to Greece, a country headed by a President many viewed as autocratic.

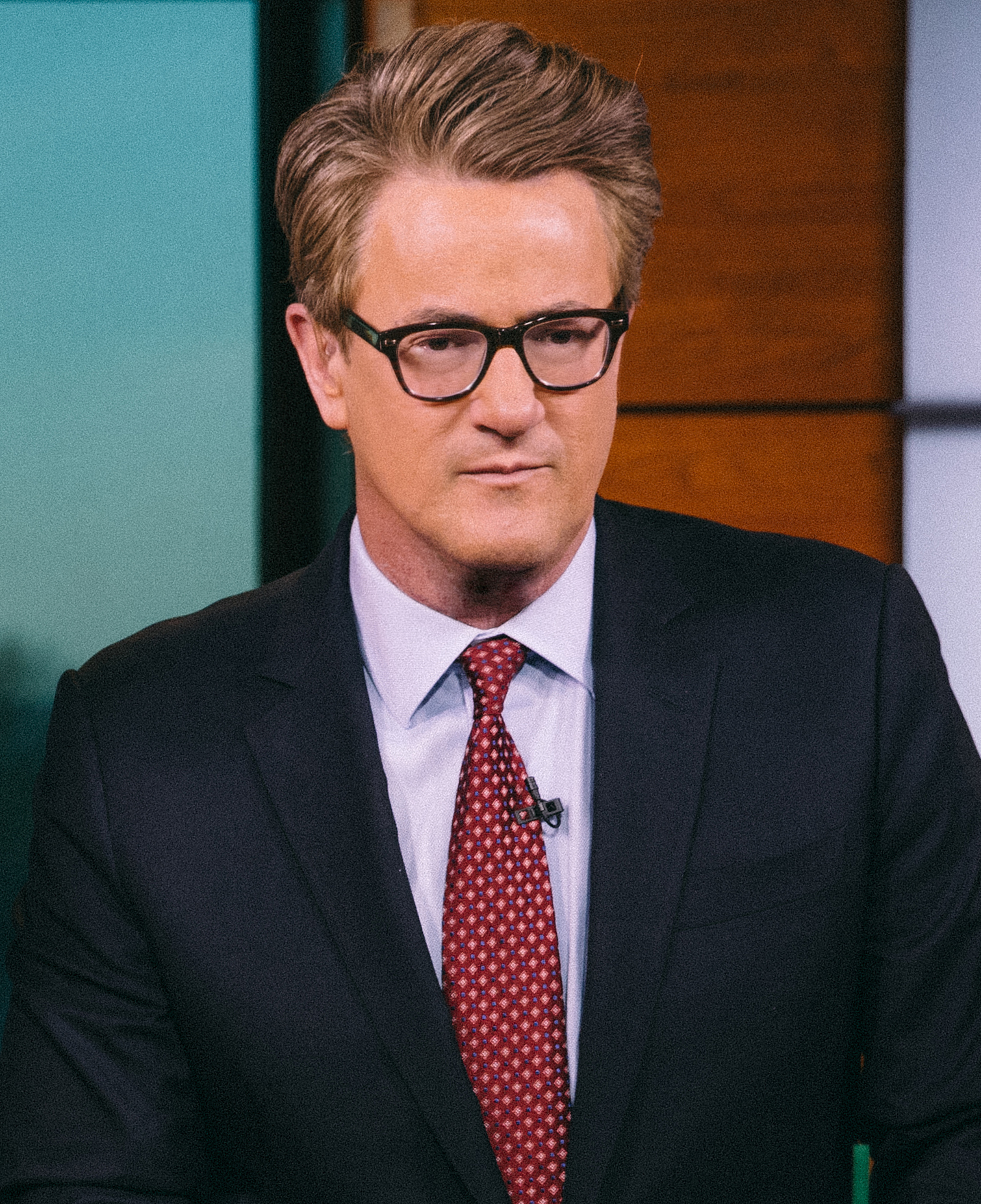
Scarborough

The novel chronicles and approves of Truman's controversial but bold decisions to pursue the bombing of Hiroshima and Nagasaki that ended WWII. Scarborough praised Truman's success in forcing the Soviets to eventually withdraw their support for Communist insurgencies in both Turkey and Greece when Great Britain could no longer afford to provide financial assistance to support the military efforts of the two nations. Scarborough's chapter, Eleven Minutes, details Truman's support of Israel in an era when anti-Semitism was still present and a Jewish state was a questionable prospect. Demonstrating strong leadership, despite considerable opposition from Congress and the State department headed by George Marshall, Truman made the strong move to become one of the first countries to support the new state of Israel in May 1948.

Equally important was Truman's decision to defend South Korea from the Communist aggression of the North, a move consistent with the intent of the Truman Doctrine. In a bold move in 1948, he submitted the first comprehensive legislation on civil rights, issuing Executive Order 9981 to start racial integration in the military and federal agencies.

== Critical reviews ==
=== Washington Post ===
A. J. Baime of the Washington Post gives special credit to Scarborough for being one of the first historians to reveal the underlying constructs of the Truman Doctrine, how it was made to be successful on the bloody battlefields of Greece's civil war and how it became "the backbone of America’s ideological fight against the Soviets for fifty years." One remarkable and timely side story is how, in the highly partisan era of the emerging Cold War, Democrats and Republicans, by approving the Truman Doctrine, the Marshall Plan, and the new North Atlantic Treaty Organization (NATO), worked in unison, presented a united front to the rest of the world, and illustrated how American political divisions end at the nation's borders. Unhampered by the contentious political divides of today's political climate, Baime's review noted that Americans and Congress demonstrated under Truman that loyalty to country could precede loyalty to party or personal agendas.

=== New York Times Book Review ===
John Gans of the New York Times Book Review gave a positive review and noted that Scarborough, as a former congressman himself, recognized the great success Truman had as a politician in achieving the “greatest selling job” of any president. As Scarborough noted, Truman persuaded a skeptical and untrusting Republican Congress and millions of exhausted, cautious and wary Americans to support not just foreign aid, but the Marshall Plan and NATO alliance which respectively funded the rebuilding of Western Europe after the catastrophic damage of WWII, and helped to confine the territorial ambitions of Russia.

=== New York Journal of Books ===
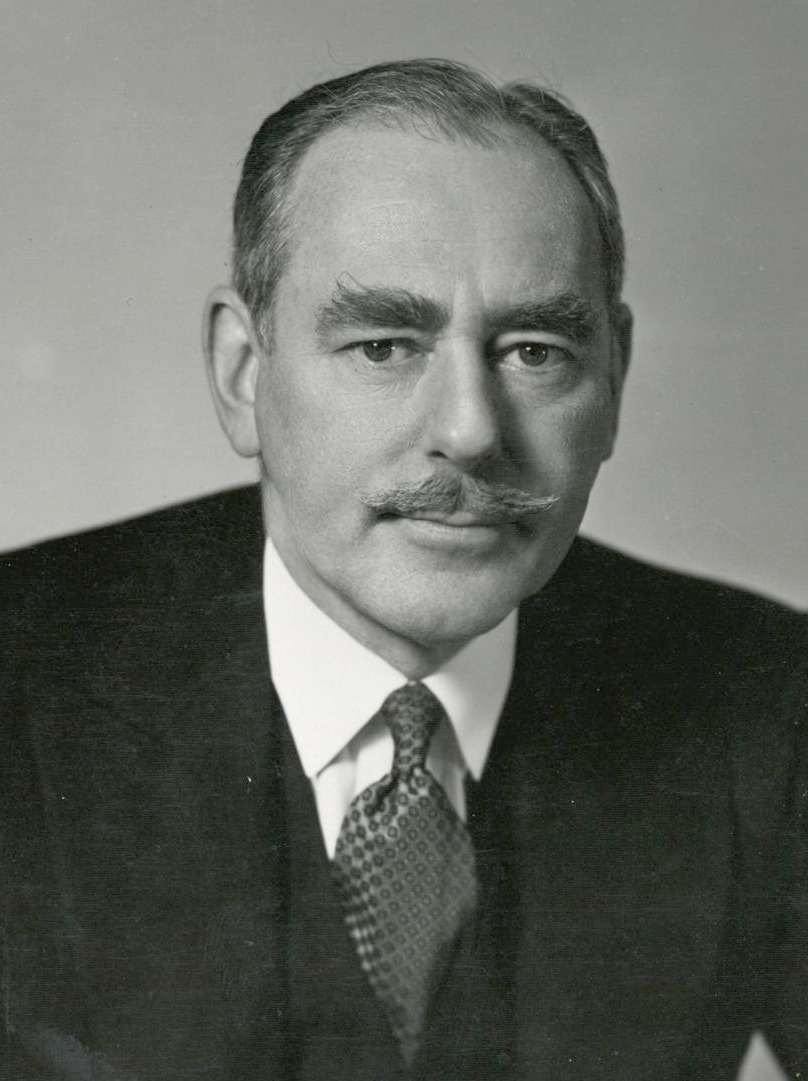
Dean G. Acheson

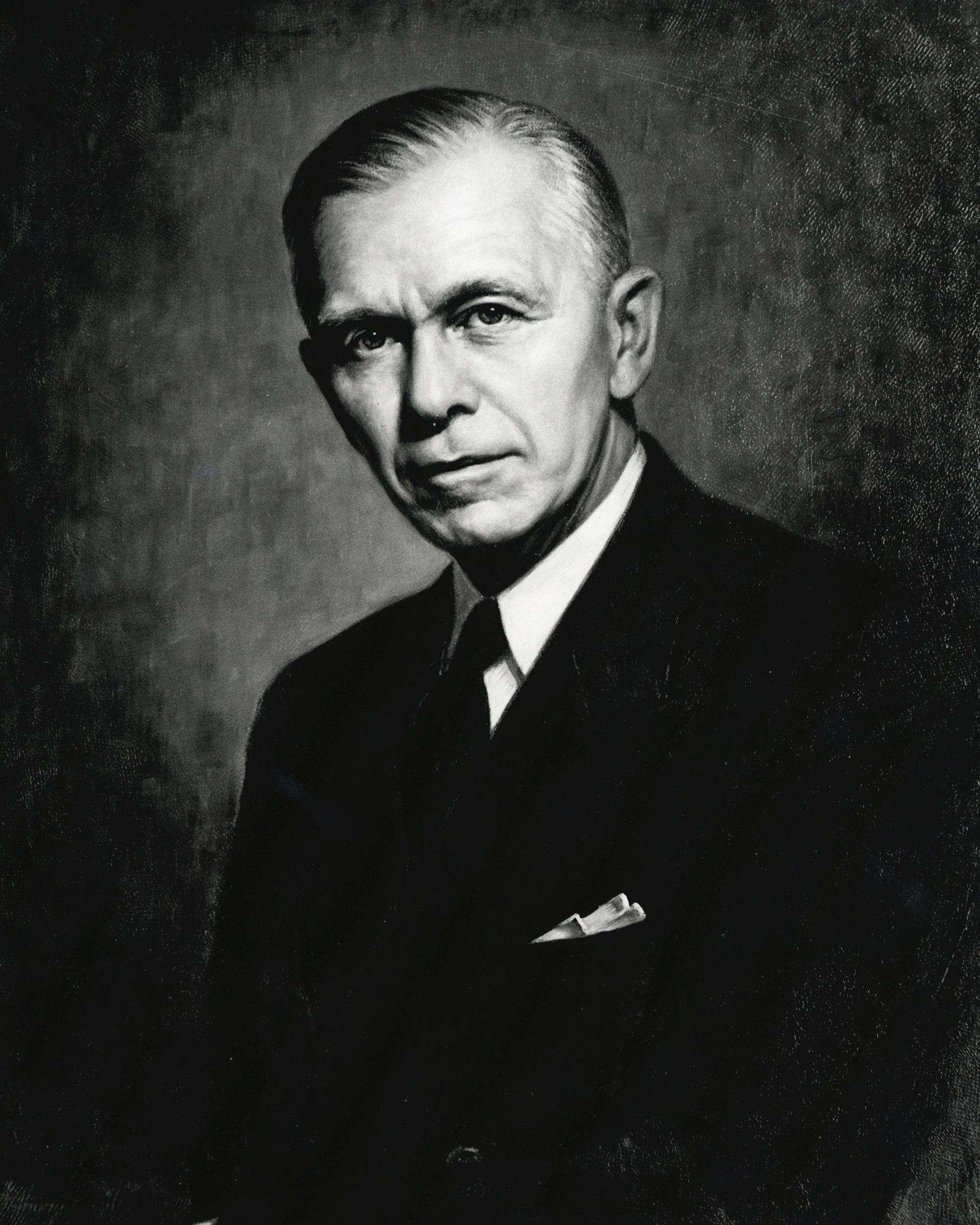
George Marshall

Reviewer Judith Reveal of The New York Journal of Books noted that one of Truman's greatest skills was selecting and retaining exceptional advisors and cabinet members to implement the Truman Doctrine. These included Secretary of State and 1953 Nobel Peace Prize winner, General George Marshall; Undersecretary of State, and co-author of the Truman Doctrine Dean Acheson; and Jack Hickerson, director of the Office of European Affairs. Once the Truman Doctrine was written and presented to congress, Senator Arthur Vandenberg, chairman of the Senate Foreign Relations Committee, became a strong advocate and supporter of the plan. George McGhee, a career diplomat, was named as the Washington coordinator for aid to both Greece and Turkey, two countries close to becoming victims of Soviet expansionism. Other important players in Truman's doctrine included Edwin C. Wilson, ambassador to Turkey, who coordinated the aid for Turkey that provided recovery from the poverty and devastation of WWII and ultimately helped to safeguard the country from Soviet aggression. Dwight Griswold, a previously Republican Governor of the state of Nebraska, headed America's mission to provide Greece with financial assistance which was supplemented by Great Britain's critical military support.
