= Joe Scarborough =

American television host and politician (born 1963)

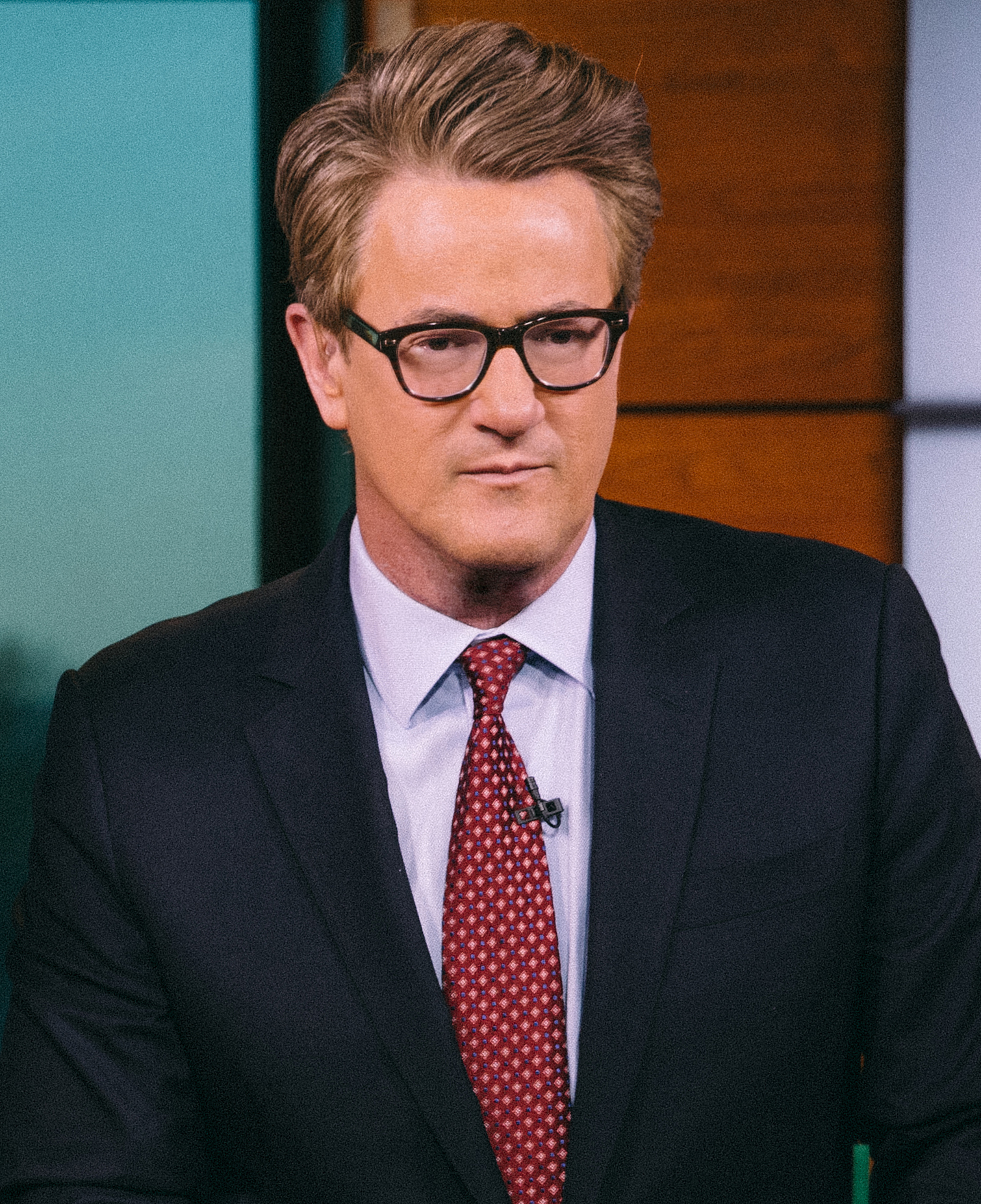
- Scarborough in 2017

Member of the U.S. House of Representatives from Florida's 1st district
- In office January 3, 1995 – September 5, 2001
- Preceded by: Earl Hutto
- Succeeded by: Jeff Miller

Personal details
- Born: Charles Joseph Scarborough; April 9, 1963 (age 63) Doraville, Georgia, U.S.
- Party: Republican (before 2017); Independent (2017–present)
- Spouses: Melanie Hinton (m. 1986; div. 1999); Susan Waren (m. 2001; div. 2013); Mika Brzezinski (m. 2018)
- Children: 4
- Education: University of Alabama (BA); University of Florida (JD)

Charles Joseph Scarborough (/ˈskɑːrbʌroʊ/; born April 9, 1963) is an American television host and former politician who is the co-host of Morning Joe on MS NOW, alongside his wife Mika Brzezinski and Willie Geist. He previously hosted Scarborough Country on the same network. A former member of the Republican Party, Scarborough represented Florida's 1st congressional district in the U.S. House from 1995 to 2001. He was appointed to the President's Council on the 21st Century Workforce in 2002, and was a visiting fellow at the Harvard Institute of Politics at the Harvard Kennedy School of Government. He was named in the 2011 Time 100 as one of the most influential people in the world.

== Early life and education ==
Scarborough was born in Doraville, Georgia, in 1963, the son of Mary Joanna (née Clark) and George Francis Scarborough, a businessman. He has two siblings. In 1969, his family moved to Meridian, Mississippi, in 1973 to Elmira, New York, and in 1978 to Pensacola, Florida. Scarborough attended Pensacola Catholic High School in Pensacola. He earned a Bachelor of Arts degree in history from the University of Alabama in 1985 and a Juris Doctor from the University of Florida College of Law in 1990. During this time, he wrote music and produced CDs with his band, Dixon Mills, including the album Calling on Robert E. Lee, and he also coached football and taught high school. During his first year of law school, Scarborough wrote a musical about televangelists called The Gospel According to Esther which premiered at the University of Alabama to positive reviews. Later, the musical was showcased at the Alabama Shakespeare Festival.

== Legal career ==
Scarborough was admitted to the Florida Bar in 1991 and practiced law in Pensacola.

Scarborough's most high-profile case was briefly representing Michael F. Griffin, who murdered Dr. David Gunn in 1993. Griffin's father was a friend of Scarborough's in-laws, and Joe agreed to represent Griffin until the murder suspect found adequate representation. Before removing himself from the case, Scarborough made several court appearances representing Griffin, later saying: "There was no way in hell I could sit in at a civil trial, let alone a capital trial," referring to the prospect of prosecutors seeking the death penalty against Griffin. Scarborough assisted Griffin in choosing other counsel from the many who offered their services, however, and helped shield the family from the media exposure, pro bono.

Scarborough's political profile was also raised when he assisted with a petition drive in late-1993, leading a tax revolt that defeated a proposed 65 percent increase in Pensacola's property taxes.

== U.S. House of Representatives ==
=== Elections ===
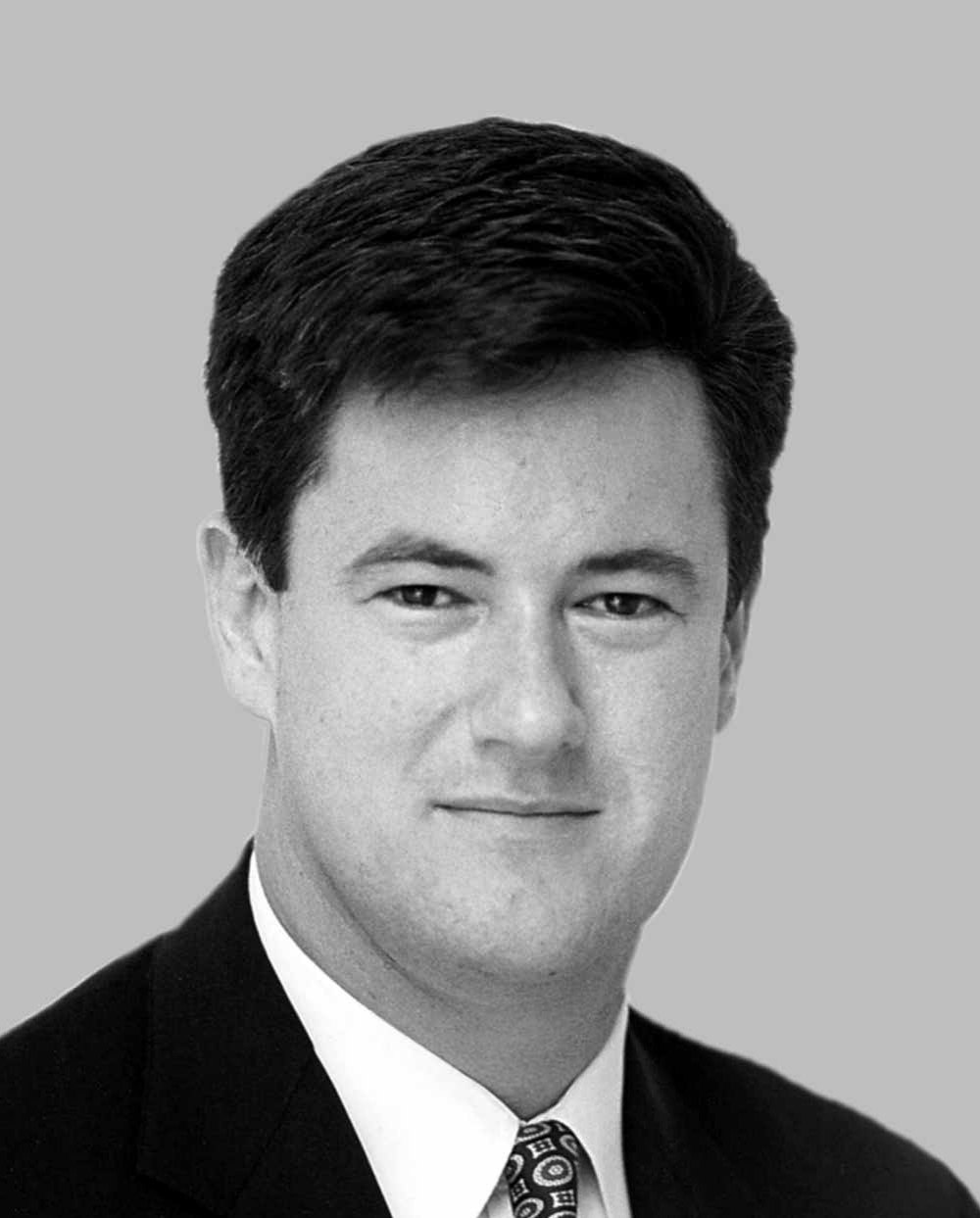
Scarborough in 1995

In 1994, Scarborough was elected to the U.S. House of Representatives for Florida's 1st congressional district, becoming the first Republican to represent the Florida Panhandle since Reconstruction. The seat had become open when eight-term Democratic incumbent Earl Hutto retired. In the general election, Scarborough defeated the Democratic candidate, Pensacola attorney Vince "Vinnie" Whibbs, Jr., with 61 percent of the vote. Whibbs was the son of former Pensacola mayor Vince Whibbs. This district had not supported a Democratic candidate for U.S. president since 1960; however, Democratic candidates had continued to hold most local offices well into the 1990s. Scarborough's win coincided with a large Republican wave, known as the Republican Revolution, that allowed the Republicans to take the majority in the House for the first time in 40 years.

Scarborough was reelected with 72 percent of the vote in 1996. In 1998 and 2000, he faced only write-in candidates as opposition.

=== Tenure ===
In June 2000, during his congressional career, he received a 95 percent lifetime rating from the American Conservative Union. He signed the Contract with America. Scarborough was a member of the Armed Services, Judiciary, Government Reform, and Education committees. In 1998 he was named chairman of the Civil Service Committee.

Scarborough was one of a group of about 40 freshmen Republican legislators who dubbed themselves the "New Federalists" after The Federalist Papers. Scarborough was elected political director of the incoming legislators. The New Federalists called for sweeping cuts in the U.S. government, including plans to "privatize, localize, consolidate, [or] eliminate" the departments of Commerce, Education, Energy and Housing and Urban Development. House Speaker Newt Gingrich tapped Scarborough to head a Republican task force on education, and Scarborough declared, "Our goal is to get as much money, power, and authority out of Washington and get as much money, power, and authority into the classroom as possible." Rep. John Kasich (R-Ohio), then chairman of the House Budget Committee, adopted Scarborough's language eliminating the federal Department of Education in the 1996 House Budget Resolution. The budget passed the House by a vote of 238–193. Scarborough and the group played a pivotal role in pressing Gingrich to keep the GOP's promise to balance the federal budget.

Scarborough supported a number of anti-abortion positions while in Congress including banning family planning funding in US aid abroad; banning partial-birth abortions; and making it illegal to transport minors to get an abortion. He voted in favor of the Unborn Victims of Violence Act, that made it a crime to harm a fetus during the commission of other crimes.

Scarborough sponsored a bill to force the U.S. to withdraw from the United Nations after a four-year transition and replace it with an international organization of democratic nations. He voted to make the Corporation for Public Broadcasting self-sufficient by eliminating federal funding. He also voted for the "Medicare Preservation act of 1995," which cut the projected growth of Medicare by $270 billion over ten years. Scarborough was one of few house Republicans to vote against efforts by Gingrich to cut Medicaid funding and the only Republican in the Florida delegation to vote against oil drilling royalty relief, which Scarborough blasted as "corporate welfare". He voted against the "Small Business Job Protection Act of 1996," which raised the minimum wage to $5.15 an hour. Scarborough had a conservative voting record on economic, social, and foreign policy issues but was seen as moderate on environmental issues and human rights causes, including supporting the closure of the School of the Americas and defending accused terrorist Lori Berenson. Scarborough also teamed up with civil rights leaders in a controversial effort to rename a historic Pensacola street after Martin Luther King, Jr. The Pensacola News Journal praised Scarborough’s leadership despite these efforts not being of political benefit to him.

While in Congress, Scarborough received several awards, including the "Friend of the Taxpayer Award" from Americans for Tax Reform; the "Guardian of Small Business Award" from the National Federation of Independent Business; the "Spirit of Enterprise Award" from the United States Chamber of Commerce; the "Taxpayer's Hero Award" from the Citizens Against Government Waste; and the "Guardian of Seniors' Rights Award" from the 60 Plus Association. In 1996, Scarborough spoke at the John Birch Society’s Council Dinner in Woodland Hills, Los Angeles.

Scarborough was one of the 228 members of the House who voted to impeach Bill Clinton in December 1998.

=== Committee memberships ===
- 104th Congress – Committee on Government Reform and Oversight – Committee on National Security (formerly Committee on Armed Services)
- 105th Congress – Committee on National Security – Committee on Government Reform and Oversight – Committee on Education and the Workforce
- 106th Congress – Committee on Armed Services – Committee on Government Reform – Committee on the Judiciary
- 107th Congress – Committee on Government Reform – Committee on the Judiciary

=== Electoral history ===
Florida's 1st congressional district: Results 1994–2000
Year	Democratic	Votes	Pct	Republican	Votes	Pct
1994	Vince Whibbs	70,416	38%	Joe Scarborough	112,974	62%
1996	Kevin Beck	66,495	27%	Joe Scarborough	175,946	73%
1998	Tom Wells (write-in)	663	0%	Joe Scarborough	140,525	99.5%
2000	Unopposed	N/A	0%	Joe Scarborough	226,473	100%

=== Resignation ===
In May 2001, five months into his fourth term in Congress, Scarborough stated his intention to resign to spend more time with his children. Of his resignation, Scarborough said, "The realization has come home to me that they're at a critical stage of their lives and I would rather be judged at the end of my life as a father than as a congressman." A special election was held in October 2001 to replace Scarborough. Since then, Scarborough has contemplated returning to politics several times. In 2017, Scarborough left the Republican Party to become an independent.

== Media career ==
In 1999, while still serving in Congress, Scarborough founded the free weekly Pensacola-area newspaper The Florida Sun. The paper merged in 2001 and is now known as the Independent News.

After leaving Congress, Scarborough worked as an environmental lawyer in Florida.

=== Scarborough Country ===
In April 2003, Scarborough Country debuted as a nightly primetime show on MSNBC.

In 2005 the program covered politics and popular culture. Scarborough broadcast the show from Biloxi, MS, during the immediate aftermath of Hurricane Katrina. After three days of reporting on the scenes, Scarborough called the situation in the Gulf Coast region "nothing short of a national disgrace". The Times-Picayune wrote that Scarborough’s experiences “put him on the shortlist of network anchors and correspondents for whom Gulf Coast assignments during and immediately after Katrina proved life-changing.” Because of Scarborough's criticism of President Bush, the San Francisco Chronicle said his Katrina coverage had "become essential viewing." Presidential historian Douglas Brinkley wrote in his book on Katrina, The Great Deluge, that “Joe Scarborough was keenly attuned to the devastation along the Gulf Coast...and his diagnosis of the failures was right on the mark."

=== Radio ===
On December 8, 2008, Scarborough and Morning Joe co-host Mika Brzezinski began hosting a two-hour late-morning radio show on WABC (770 AM) in New York City, replacing 12-year veteran host John Gambling. On April 26, 2010, the radio show was placed on "hiatus", which Scarborough said was to redevelop its format into a new three-hour show. The show never returned.

=== Morning Joe ===
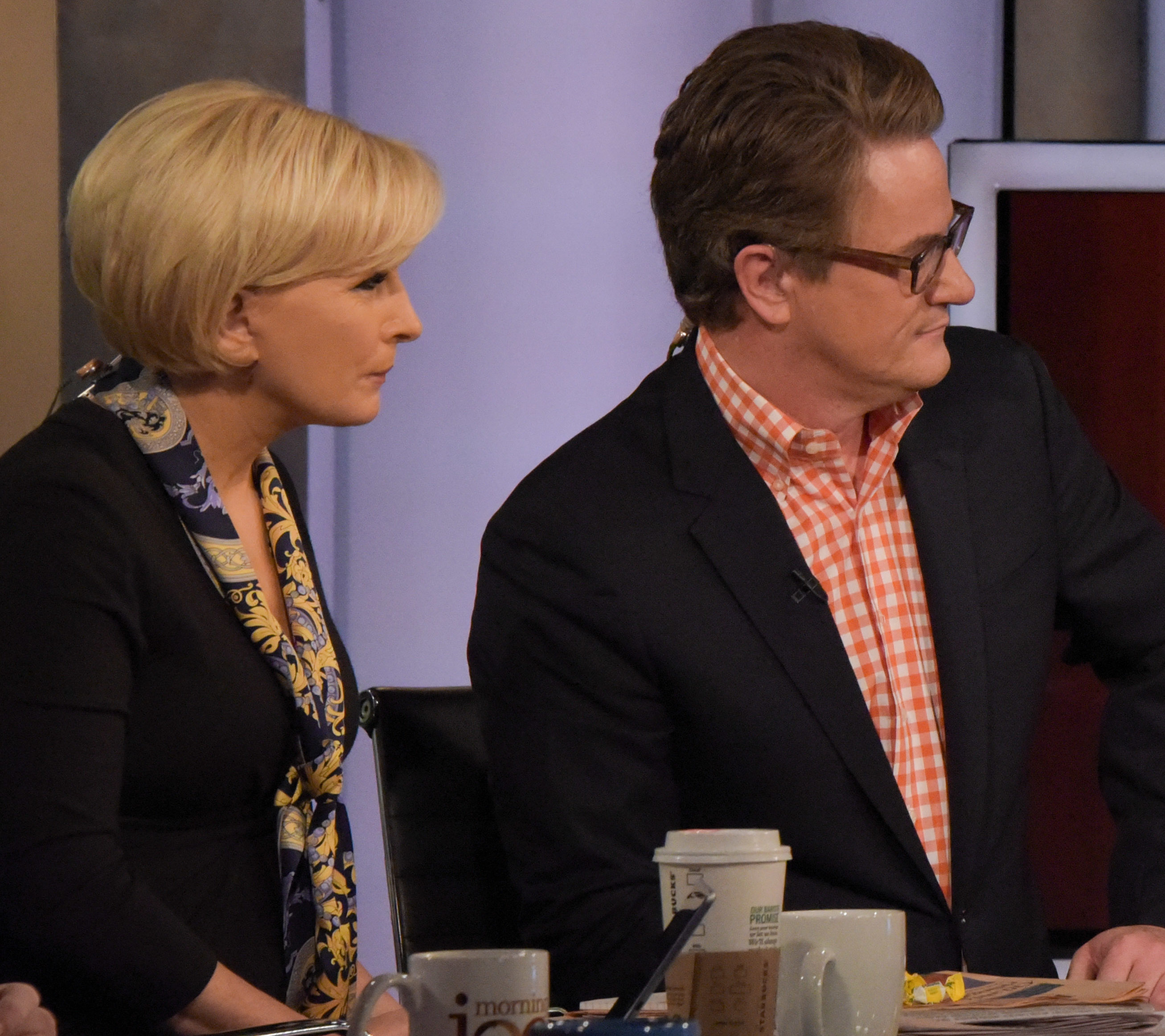
Scarborough on Morning Joe with co-host (and now wife) Mika Brzezinski

In May 2007, Scarborough became one of the rotating hosts auditioning for the slot vacated by Imus in the Morning on MSNBC. With his morning show, Scarborough won the slot permanently in July 2007.

Morning Joe is a weekday MSNBC news and talk show from 6 a.m. to 10 a.m. Eastern Time. It features Joe Scarborough providing both enterprise reporting and discussion on the news of the day in a panel format with co-hosts Mika Brzezinski and Willie Geist. The show features in-depth discussions that help drive the day's political conversation, and initial reviews were positive. The New York Times said it was "unlike anything else on morning television" and American Journalism Review said the show "set the agenda for the day's news".

In 2007, New York City mayor Michael Bloomberg joined Geist, Brzezinski, MSNBC president Phil Griffin, and Scarborough to cut the ribbon on the new set of Morning Joe at 30 Rock.

The program became a Washington "breakfast staple", showing up on screens at the congressional gym and on government jets. Scarborough has covered presidential elections and conventions.

According to Nielsen ratings in 2016, Morning Joe delivered MSNBC's biggest ever total viewer and demo audiences for that time period and beat third-place CNN in both categories. This marked Morning Joe's seventh straight year topping CNN in total viewers. Scarborough also hosts Joe Scarborough Presents a primetime special dedicated to a single topic. The 2023 premiere featured Joe Biden, Bill and Hillary Clinton, and Tony Blair. He has appeared on The Late Show with Stephen Colbert, The Tonight Show Starring Jimmy Fallon, and Late Night With Seth Meyers.” He is a regular guest on NBC and MSNBC news programs such as PoliticsNation with Al Sharpton and Meet the Press. Joe also appeared as himself on two episodes of Curb Your Enthusiasm in 2024.

In 2023, Morning Joe was the #1 cable morning show in New York and Washington, DC. Nationally, Morning Joe ranked #2 in all of cable television in its time slot for the 7th straight year. Morning Joe beat CNN in the ratings for the 14th straight year in total audience and in the Nielson A25-54 demographic group for the 8th straight year. Compared to the previous year, Morning Joe had double-digit viewership growth among total viewers and adults ages 25–54, while CNN This Morning and FOX & Friends had double-digit declines. In August 2023, Adweek reported Morning Joe was the most-watched morning cable news program.

== Feud with Donald Trump ==
In an op-ed for The Washington Post in August 2016, Scarborough argued that the Republican Party must "dump Donald Trump" as their presidential candidate. Drawing attention to Trump's remarks about Hillary Clinton and the Second Amendment, Scarborough wrote: "A bloody line has been crossed that cannot be ignored. At long last, Donald Trump has left the Republican Party few options but to act decisively and get this political train wreck off the tracks before something terrible happens."

In June 2017, Scarborough and Brzezinski were the targets of tweets by President Trump that, in response to their coverage of his administration, referred to Scarborough as "Psycho Joe" and called Brzezinski "low I.Q. Crazy Mika," while asserting that she was "bleeding badly from a face-lift" when he previously encountered her at Mar-a-Lago. The hosts responded with an op-ed in The Washington Post, in which they described White House officials telling them that the president would kill a pending National Enquirer article if they apologized to Trump for their coverage of him. The president's tweets received criticism from many Republican lawmakers, including Speaker of the House Paul Ryan, Senators John McCain, Susan Collins, Ben Sasse, Lindsey Graham, and Lisa Murkowski.

Trump has also aired "wild allegations and fact-free innuendo" stemming from an incident from Scarborough's time in Congress. On July 20, 2001, while Scarborough was in Washington, D.C., one of his aides, 28 years old, Lori Bolterstein Klausutis, was found dead on the floor of his congressional office in Fort Walton Beach, Florida. An autopsy determined that an undiagnosed heart-valve irregularity had caused the 28-year-old to lose consciousness, fall, and hit her head on the edge of a desk the day before. Media trafficked in speculation about the death, often connecting it with Scarborough's resignation from Congress, announced in May. The claim that Scarborough was involved in the death was promoted by publisher Markos Moulitsas. Since 2017, Trump has resurrected the debunked rumor and has called for another investigation. The Wall Street Journal, New York Post, and Washington Examiner have condemned Trump's remarks. "It's remarkable that we have a president who is trying to have someone prosecute the person he considers to be his chief critic in the media," Scarborough responded in 2020. "That's what Putin does. That's what Orban does. That's what autocrats have been doing for centuries." In May 2020, the aide's widower wrote a letter to Twitter's chief executive Jack Dorsey begging him to delete Trump's tweets saying "President Trump on Tuesday tweeted to his nearly 80 million followers alluding to the repeatedly debunked falsehood that my wife was murdered by her boss, former U.S. Rep. Joe Scarborough. The son of the president followed and more directly attacked my wife by tweeting to his followers as the means of spreading this vicious lie." Kara Swisher followed up with an op-ed in The New York Times on May 26, 2020, calling on Twitter to hold Trump to the company's rules. That same day, Twitter began fact-checking Trump's posts and applying warnings to his tweets when they made misleading claims about mail-in voting.

In November 2024, following the 2024 United States presidential election, Mika and Joe met with Donald Trump at Mar-a-Lago.

Trump made numerous inaccurate and misleading claims, particularly about NATO and Greenland, while repeating long-debunked assertions on foreign policy, the economy, and other issues during his speech at the 2026 World Economic Forum in Davos. The remarks prompted multiple fact checks citing errors and mischaracterizations across the address. Morning Joe extended beyond its standard four-hour broadcast to fact-check and contextualize several of Trump’s false claims, with the Poynter Institute noting that co-host Joe Scarborough was “masterful in pointing out the lies, misleading statements, and bizarre comments made by Trump.”

== Public opinions ==
In August 2019, Scarborough drew criticism after posting conspiracy-driven tweets about the death of Jeffrey Epstein, an American financier multimillionaire and convicted sex offender. Scarborough tweeted: "A guy who had information that would have destroyed rich and powerful men's lives ends up dead in his jail cell. How predictably... Russian."

In January 2021, Scarborough excoriated the Capitol Hill Police for having enabled the attack at the U.S. Capitol by Donald Trump supporters. He claimed a double standard that had the perpetrators been either black or Muslim, they likely would have been dealt with more harshly.

== Books ==
Scarborough released his first book, Rome Wasn't Burnt in a Day: the Real Deal on how Politicians, Bureaucrats, and other Washington Barbarians are Bankrupting America, on October 4, 2005.

In his second book, The Last Best Hope, released on June 9, 2009, Scarborough outlined a plan to help guide conservatives back to a political majority after their defeats in the 2006 midterm elections and the 2008 presidential election.

On November 12, 2013, Scarborough released his third book, The Right Path: From Ike to Reagan, How Republicans Once Mastered Politics—and Can Again.

On November 24, 2020, Scarborough released his fourth book, Saving Freedom: Truman, the Cold War, and the Fight for Western Civilization.

== Music ==
Scarborough released his debut EP, Mystified, on June 23, 2017. A video for the title track of the new wave-inspired EP was also released on the same day. Scarborough said he planned to release a new EP every month for the following four years.

== Influence ==
Scarborough was named on the 2011 TIME 100 list of the world’s most influential people. TIME noted his fearless approach to speaking his mind "without fear or favor" and his dedication to placing "country before party" making him an essential voice in American politics.

Alongside Mika Brzezinski, in 2012 Scarborough was named on Vanity Fair’s “Top Media Power Players” list.

In 2015, he interviewed Republican presidential candidate Donald Trump and abruptly ended the interview, but resumed it after the commercial break. Having known Scarborough for years, Trump would often call into the show during his first presidential campaign. It was also reported that during his term as President, Joe Biden called Scarborough often to get the host’s take on issues, as Morning Joe was Biden’s favorite program, and it influenced who he listened to and how the White House was run.

The Monday after the attempted assassination of Trump, MSNBC preempted Morning Joe for the day, prompting threats from Scarborough to quit if the network took similar action again. The Daily Beast reported that the message of the show was “We're back—and the place to go for powerful Democrats to make their case” because in the days following Biden’s endorsement of Vice President Harris for President, Scarborough and others on the show interviewed VP nominee hopefuls Governors Roy Cooper, Andy Beshear and J.B. Pritzker. The Hollywood Reporter wrote that “at a time when TV news feels like it is fading into irrelevance with the broader public, with a certain group of extremely important and influential viewers (or even one viewer in particular), it appears to be more essential than ever.”

In 2022, Scarborough, Brzezinski, and Willie Geist were named Mediaite's Most Influential in News Media

In 2023, Mediaite recognized the Morning Joe team as the "clear favorite for liberal viewers and inside-the-Beltway audiences," noting Joe Scarborough's role as the "leading man," delivering daily insights into the political zeitgeist with sharp analysis and energy.

In 2024, Joe Scarborough and Mika Brzezinski were honored as Mediaite’s Most Influential in News Media, celebrated for being among the year’s "biggest stars in all of media." Their show was the most closely tracked program leading up to the presidential election, with viewers recognizing the significant bipartisan influence the hosts wield across the political spectrum.

In 2025, Joe Scarborough and Mika Brzezinski were ranked No. 2 on Mediaite’s list, recognizing their “influence in political circles remains enormous and likely unparalleled.” Mediaite cited the duo’s role in shaping the daily political agenda and their ability to attract senior government officials across administrations as central to the program’s sustained relevance and influence in U.S. political discourse. It also highlighted Scarborough’s often newsworthy monologues, Brzezinski’s incisive interviewing style, and the on-air chemistry of the co-hosts, describing the program as “four hours of top-flight morning television.”

== Awards and honors ==
- In 2016, Scarborough was inducted into the Cable Hall of Fame with Mika Brzezinski.
- In 2017, Harvard awarded Scarborough and Brzezinski a Visiting Fellowship at Harvard Kennedy School's Institute of Politics.
- Scarborough was honored with Brzezinski in 2018 with the Radio Television Digital News Foundation's Leonard Zeidenberg First Amendment Award for a major contribution to the protection of First Amendment freedoms.

== Personal life ==
In 1986, Scarborough married Melanie Hinton. The couple had two sons and divorced in 1999. While interviewing Robert F. Kennedy Jr. on June 21, 2005, Scarborough expressed concerns about the possibility that one of his sons may have suffered vaccine damage (see Thimerosal controversy). Scarborough said, "My son, born in 1991, has a slight form of autism called Asperger's. When I was practicing law and also when I was in Congress, parents would constantly come to me, and they would bring me videotapes of their children, and they were all around the age of my son or younger. So, something happened in 1989."

In October 2001, Scarborough married his second wife, Susan Waren, a former aide to Florida governor Jeb Bush and a former congressional committee staffer. Their daughter was born in August 2003; their son was born in May 2008. Scarborough and Waren divorced in January 2013.

In early 2017, during a trip to Antibes, France, Scarborough became engaged to his co-host Mika Brzezinski. The couple married on November 24, 2018, in Washington, D.C., in a ceremony officiated by U.S. Representative Elijah Cummings.

As of 2016, Scarborough has residences in both New Canaan, Connecticut, an affluent exurb of New York, and Jupiter, Florida.

== See also ==
- Cable news in the United States
- New Yorkers in journalism

U.S. House of Representatives
Preceded by Earl Hutto	Member of the U.S. House of Representatives from Florida's 1st congressional district 1995–2001	Succeeded by Jeff Miller
U.S. order of precedence (ceremonial)
Preceded by Pete Peterson as Former U.S. Representative	Order of precedence of the United States as Former U.S. Representative	Succeeded by Tom Feeney as Former U.S. Representative
