= Gallop Franklin =

American politician

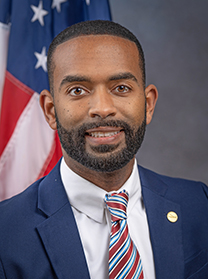

Member of the Florida House of Representatives from the 8th district
- Incumbent
- Assumed office November 8, 2022
- Preceded by: Ramon Alexander

Personal details
- Born: Gallop Phedro Franklin II; August 22, 1988 (age 38) Tallahassee, Florida, U.S.
- Party: Democratic
- Education: Florida A&M University (BS, PharmD); Cornell University (MS, MBA)

Gallop Phedro Franklin II (born August 22, 1988) is a pharmacist and American politician who represents District 8 in the Florida House of Representatives covering part of the Big Bend area of the Florida panhandle. Franklin is a member of the Democratic Party.

== Early life and education ==
Franklin was born and raised in Tallahassee, Florida. He is the son of Margaret Franklin and Gallop Franklin, Sr.

When he was a child, before attending and graduating from Leon High School in Tallahassee, Franklin was home schooled by his mother, a professional educator.

Franklin earned an undergraduate degree and a Doctor of Pharmacy degree from Florida A&M University. In 2024, Franklin earned a Masters of Business Administration degree from the Samuel Curtis Johnson Graduate School of Management at Cornell University.

== College leadership ==
As an undergraduate at Florida A&M University, with a focus on helping low-income FAMU students struggling with skyrocketing college costs, the school's student body elected Franklin to serve two consecutive terms as the president of the university's Student Government Association. Franklin also served on the Florida A&M University Board of Trustees and as president of the Florida Student Association, where he sat as a member of the Florida Board of Governors, the group responsible for overseeing the Florida State University System. Franklin was the first Florida A&M University student to serve on the Florida Board of Governors and the third to serve as Florida Student Association president.

In 2010, during Florida Gov. Charlie Crist's term, Franklin was selected to serve as a member of the sixth class of the Gubernatorial Fellowship Program. During his service as a Gubernatorial Fellow, U.S. senator Bill Nelson (D-Florida) nominated Franklin to join the Open World Leadership Program, where he was a member of a delegation that represented American public and private universities on an exchange mission to Russia to promote U.S.-Eurasian understanding and partnerships.

== Public service ==
=== As a member of the Florida House of Representatives (2022 - Current) ===
Franklin was elected to the Florida House of Representatives in November 2022. As a member of the Florida House of Representatives, Franklin has played a key role in championing legislation related to improving health care for Floridians as well as winning state funding for critical community-based education, health security, and public safety initiatives and infrastructure in Florida's Gadsden and Leon counties.

In the 2022-2024 Florida Legislature, Franklin was the prime sponsor in the Florida House of legislation signed into law by Gov. Ron DeSantis including:

- House Bill 159 (2024) to reduce the incidence of HIV in Florida by allowing licensed pharmacists to work collaboratively with physicians to dispense HIV-PEP medications to an HIV-exposed adults. The law establishes a partnership between pharmacists and physicians to allow pharmacists to screen an adult for HIV exposure and provide the results to that adult, advise the patient should see a physician for further medical consultation and/or treatment, and dispense HIV-PEP medication prescribed by a licensed health care practitioner authorized by law to prescribe such treatment.
- House Bill 935 (2024) to allow Medicaid to reimburse home health services ordered by advanced practice registered nurses and physician assistants, including essential services such as home health visits, nursing services, home health aide services, and necessary medical equipment.

In 2024, Franklin also sponsored legislation to ensure Floridians have the right to access contraception.

== Professional career highlights ==
Franklin is a Clinical Pharmacist with multifaceted work experiences that span across clinical pharmacy services within the therapeutic areas of Oncology, Labor & Delivery, Pediatrics/Neonatal, Orthopedics, Emergency Medicine, Nutrition Support, Sterile and Non-Sterile Compounding. Franklin has worked as a pharmacist at Publix Supermarkets and Tallahassee Memorial HealthCare. He also has served as a visiting professor of pharmacy at Florida A&M University.

== Personal life ==
Franklin is married to Dr. Chelsea Matthews Franklin.

== Election history ==
Earning 71% of the vote, Franklin won election to the Florida House of Representatives on November 8, 2022. In the November 5, 2024 election, Franklin won reelection to the Florida House with 72.2% of the vote.
