= David Lawrence Jr. =

American newspaper editor (born 1942)

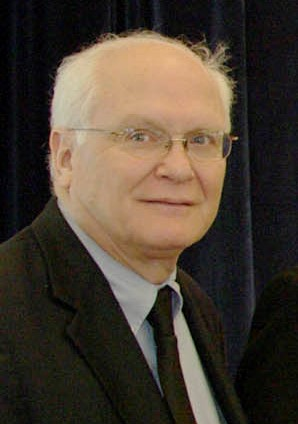
- Lawrence Jr. in 2012
- Born: March 5, 1942 (age 84); New York City, U.S.
- Monuments: David Lawrence Jr. K-8 Center
- Education: University of Florida
- Known for: The Miami Herald; Early Childhood Advocacy
- Spouse: Roberta Lawrence (1963-Present)

David Lawrence Jr. (born March 5, 1942) is an American nationally known newspaper editor and publisher who retired at the age of 56 and subsequently became a leading national advocate for children, especially in the area of early childhood investment. He is the former publisher of the Miami Herald and the Detroit Free Press. He currently serves as chair of the Children's Movement of Florida.

== Early life and education ==
Born in New York City on March 5, 1942, Lawrence is one of nine children. After living on a farm for most of his childhood, Lawrence's parents moved the family to Florida in 1956. Lawrence is a graduate of Manatee High School in Bradenton, Florida, and the University of Florida in Gainesville, where he was named "Outstanding Journalism Graduate." Lawrence married his wife Roberta on December 21, 1963. They have five children and seven grandchildren.

== Professional career ==
Lawrence worked for seven newspapers over his 35-year career. Before coming to the Miami Herald in 1989, he was publisher and executive editor of the Detroit Free Press. Previously, he was editor of The Charlotte Observer, and earlier held reporting and editing positions at four newspapers. During Lawrence's tenure as publisher of the Herald, the paper won five Pulitzer Prizes.

In August 2018, Lawrence published his autobiography, "A Dedicated Life: Journalism, Justice and a Chance for Every Child."

== Early childhood advocacy ==
Lawrence retired in 1999 as publisher of the Miami Herald to work in the area of early childhood development and readiness. He is chair of the Children's Movement of Florida. He served from 2007–2016 on the Governor's Children and Youth Cabinet. In 2002, he led the campaign for The Children’s Trust, a dedicated source of early intervention and prevention funding for children in Miami-Dade County – with an 85 percent reaffirmation from the voters in 2008. He is the “founding chair” of The Children's Trust. Governor Jeb Bush named Lawrence to the Florida Partnership for School Readiness, and he chaired that oversight board twice.

In 2002, Lawrence was a key figure in Florida's passage of a statewide constitutional amendment to provide pre-K for all 4-year-olds. He is a board member and former chair of the Early Learning Coalition of Miami-Dade and Monroe. The David Lawrence Jr. K-8 Public School opened in 2006 across from the north campus of Florida International University. A fully endowed chair in early childhood studies is established in his name at the University of Florida College of Education. Gov. Rick Scott appointed him in 2015 to the board of trustees of Florida A&M University. He is also a trustee of Barry University.

Lawrence serves as chair of the Children's Movement of Florida, a citizen-led, non-partisan movement to educate political, business and civic leaders – and all parents of the state – about the urgent need to make the well-being and education of all children Florida's highest priority.

== Awards and recognition ==
Lawrence has 13 honorary doctorates, including one from his alma mater, the University of Florida. His national honors include the Ida B. Wells Award "for exemplary leadership in providing minorities employment opportunities” and the National Association of Minority Media Executives award for "lifetime achievement in diversity." He has been honored with the American Public Health Association Award of Excellence, the Lewis Hine Award for Children and Youth, the "Children's Champion" award from the National Black Child Development Institute, the Fred Rogers Leadership Award from the Grantmakers for Children, Youth and Families, the Terri Lynne Lokoff Child Care Advocate Award and the CNC (Cuban American National Council) Lifetime Achievement Award. His writing awards include the First Amendment Award from the Scripps Howard Foundation and the Inter American Press Association Commentary Award. He chaired the national Task Force on Minorities in the Newspaper Business, was the 1991-92 president of the American Society of Newspaper Editors and the 1995–1996 president of the Inter American Press Association.

Lawrence was inducted into the Florida Newspaper Hall of Fame in 2010.
