= Mystified (EP) =

EP by Joe Scarborough
- Released: June 23, 2017
- Genre: Alternative rock; indie rock; power pop
- Label: RED Music; Sony Music

Mystified is the debut EP by Joe Scarborough (credited as "Scarborough"), released on June 23, 2017. With five tracks, the EP is in the alternative and indie genre.

== Track listing ==
1. "Mystified" – 4:52
2. "Superbad" – 3:37
3. "Time Rolls On" – 3:34
4. "Girl Like That" – 4:23
5. "Let's Fall in Love" – 4:40
