= Al Lawson =

American politician (born 1948)

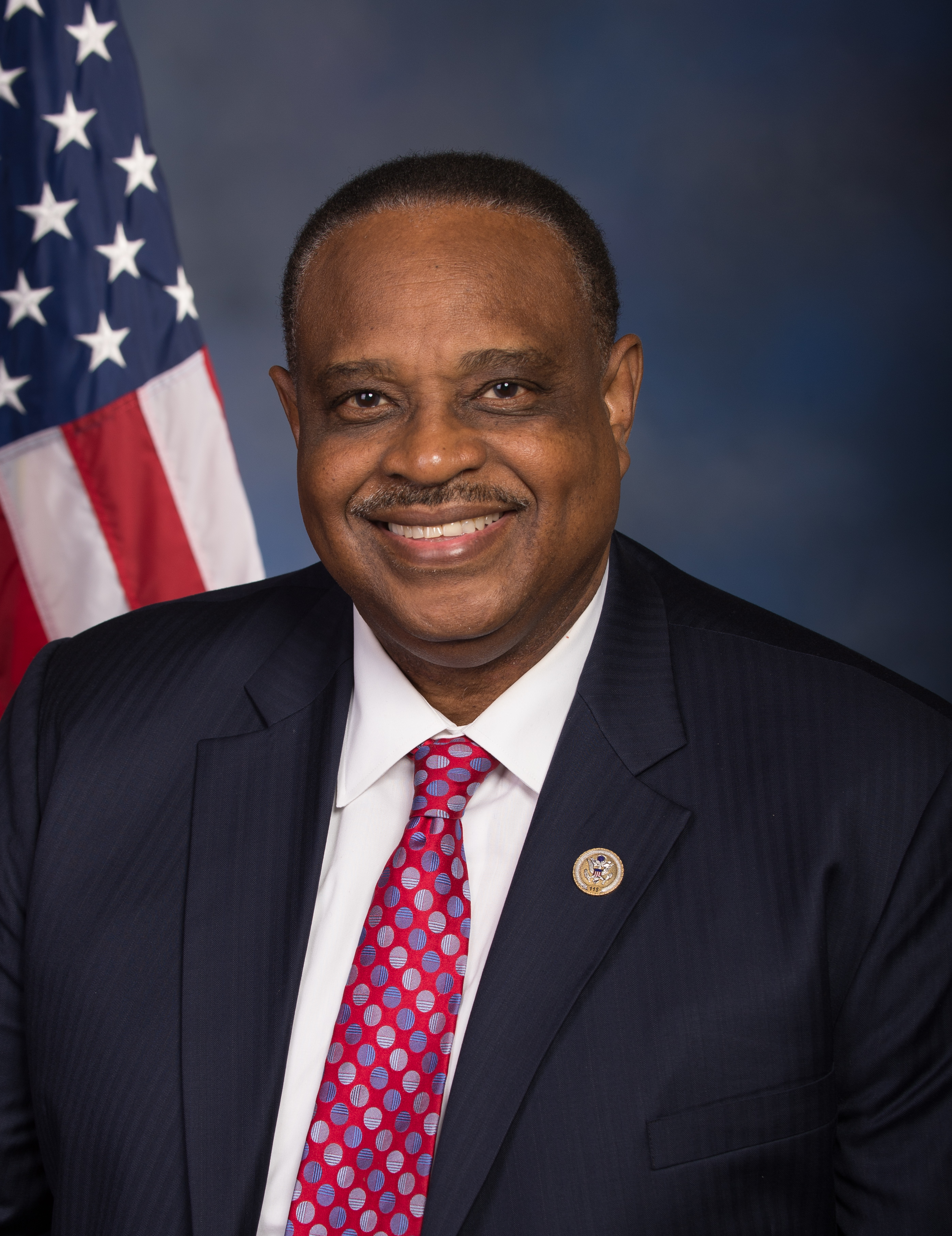
- Official portrait, 2017

Member of the U.S. House of Representatives from Florida's 5th district
- In office January 3, 2017 – January 3, 2023
- Preceded by: Corrine Brown
- Succeeded by: Neal Dunn (redistricted)

Minority Leader of the Florida Senate
- In office November 2008 – November 2, 2010
- Preceded by: Steven Geller
- Succeeded by: Nan Rich

Member of the Florida Senate
- In office November 7, 2000 – November 2, 2010
- Preceded by: Pat Thomas
- Succeeded by: Bill Montford
- Constituency: 3rd district (2000–2002); 6th district (2002–2010)

Member of the Florida House of Representatives
- In office November 7, 1982 – November 7, 2000
- Preceded by: Leonard Hall
- Succeeded by: Curtis Richardson
- Constituency: 9th district (1982–92); 8th district (1992–2000)

Personal details
- Born: Alfred James Lawson Jr. September 23, 1948 (age 77) Midway, Florida, U.S.
- Party: Democratic
- Spouse: Delores Brooks (m. 1975)
- Children: 2
- Education: Florida A&M University (BA); Florida State University (MPA)
- Website: House website

Alfred James Lawson Jr. (born September 23, 1948) is an American former politician who was the U.S. representative for Florida's 5th congressional district from 2017 to 2023. The district, which was eliminated following redistricting during the 2022 Florida legislative session, stretched across most of the border with Georgia, including most of the majority-black areas between Tallahassee and Jacksonville. Lawson challenged fellow Congressman Neal Dunn in the newly redrawn 2nd congressional district, which pitted them against each other in Lawson's home city. Lawson won the Democratic primary unopposed, and lost to Dunn in the general election.

Lawson served in the Florida legislature for 28 years, from 1982 to 2000 in the Florida House of Representatives and from 2000 to 2010 in the Florida Senate (representing the 6th district), where he was elected to serve as the Democratic leader and rose to the rank of "Dean of the Senate" before his election to Congress. After two failed campaigns for Congress, Lawson defeated incumbent Corrine Brown in the 2016 Democratic primary and won the general election.

== Early life and education ==
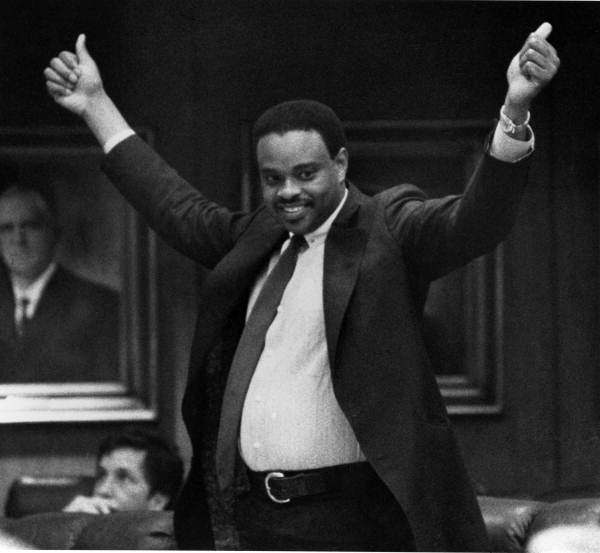
Lawson as a state representative, 1984

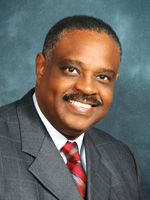
Lawson as a state senator, 2006

Lawson was born in Midway, Florida, and attended Havana Northside High School, where he was a standout athlete in basketball and track. He went on to be a basketball star at Florida Agricultural and Mechanical University (FAMU), where he earned a bachelor's degree in political science. After a brief stint as a professional basketball player with the Indiana Pacers and Atlanta Hawks, Lawson returned to Tallahassee, where he landed a job at Florida State University as an assistant basketball coach and took the Seminoles to the Elite Eight of the NCAA tournament. Lawson also earned his Master of Public Administration from Florida State University.

Lawson is an Episcopalian.

== U.S. House of Representatives ==
=== Elections ===
==== 2010 ====
Lawson ran for the Democratic nomination in Florida's 2nd congressional district in 2010, challenging seven-term incumbent Allen Boyd. He narrowly lost to Boyd in the Democratic primary, and Boyd lost to Republican newcomer Steve Southerland in the general election by more than 12 percentage points.

==== 2012 ====
Lawson ran for the seat again, and won the Democratic nomination against Blue Dog-endorsed state representative Leonard Bembry. He lost to Southerland in the general election by less than 6 points.

==== 2016 ====
A lawsuit challenging the Florida congressional district map radically changed the 5th district. For the past quarter-century, the district and its predecessors had covered most of the majority-black precincts from Jacksonville to Orlando. The new map changed the district to an east–west configuration stretching across all or part of eight counties from Tallahassee to downtown Jacksonville. The redrawn district included Lawson's home in Tallahassee, and Lawson announced he would run for the 5th on December 15, 2015, setting up a battle against Corrine Brown, the only representative the district had had since its creation in 1993.

The district's demographics appeared to be against Lawson. While it now included most of Tallahassee, the capital and its suburbs only accounted for 32% of the district's population, while the Jacksonville area-Brown's base-accounted for 61%. But Lawson's candidacy received a significant boost in July 2016, when Brown was indicted on federal corruption charges. He defeated Brown in the Democratic primary—the real contest in this heavily Democratic district—on August 30. He then defeated Republican Glo Smith in the November 8 general election with 64% of the vote.

=== Committee assignments ===
- Committee on Agriculture
  - Subcommittee on Nutrition
  - Subcommittee on General Farm Commodities and Risk Management
- United States House Committee on Financial Services
  - Diversity and Inclusion
  - Housing, Community Development and Insurance
  - Consumer Protection and Financial Institutions

=== Caucus memberships ===
- Congressional Black Caucus
- New Democrat Coalition

== Political positions ==
=== Gun policy ===
After the Stoneman Douglas High School shooting in Parkland, Florida, Lawson expressed frustration with the lack of action on gun regulation and placed blame on lobbying organizations, saying "the stranglehold of the gun lobby has gone on long enough". Lawson supports restriction on assault weapons. In 2017, he voted no on the Concealed Carry Reciprocity Act of 2017, which would require all states to recognize concealed carry permits issued in other states. Additionally, those with concealed carry permits would be permitted to carry concealed weapons in school zones. Lawson also voted no on the Veterans Second Amendment Protection Act, which would have allowed veterans who are considered "mentally incompetent" to purchase ammunition and firearms unless declared a danger by a judge.

=== Yemeni civil war ===
Lawson was one of five house Democrats to vote for the U.S. to continue selling arms to Saudi Arabia and to support the Saudi Arabian-led intervention in Yemen. This vote was part a vote series that allowed debate and votes on the Farm Bill in 2018, which he called a necessary step to provide assistance to farmers in his largely agricultural district.

== See also ==
- List of African-American United States representatives

Florida Senate
Preceded by Steven Geller	Minority Leader of the Florida Senate; 2008–2010	Succeeded by Nan Rich
U.S. House of Representatives
Preceded by Corrine Brown	Member of the U.S. House of Representatives from Florida's 5th congressional district 2017–2023	Succeeded by John Rutherford
U.S. order of precedence (ceremonial)
Preceded by Val Demings as Former U.S. Representative	Order of precedence of the United States as Former U.S. Representative	Succeeded by Stephanie Murphy as Former U.S. Representative
