= Ramon Alexander =

American politician

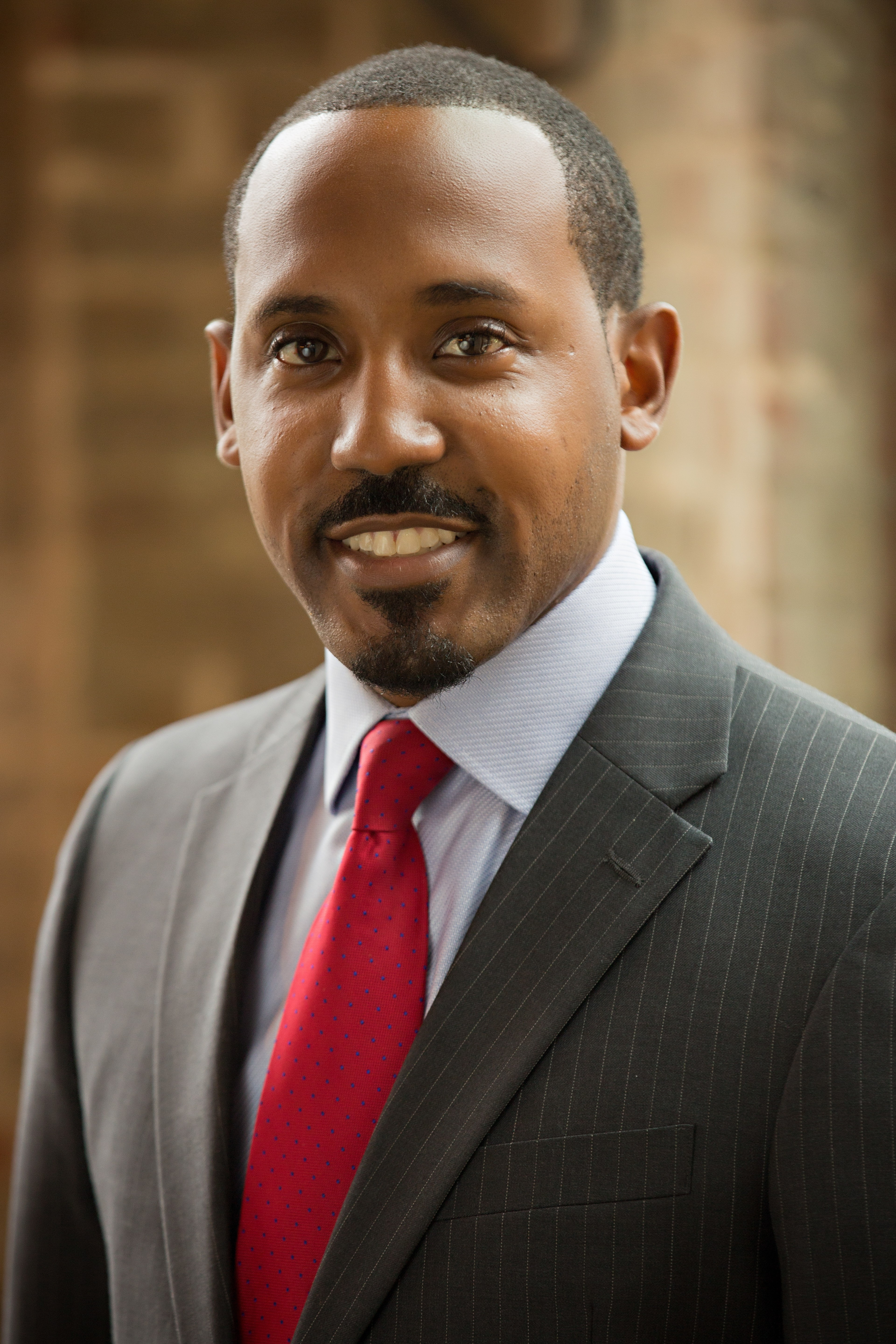

Member of the Florida House of Representatives from the 8th district
- In office November 8, 2016 – November 8, 2022
- Preceded by: Alan Williams
- Succeeded by: Gallop Franklin

Personal details
- Born: October 19, 1984 (age 41) Tallahassee, Florida, U.S.
- Party: Democratic
- Spouse: Taniyah Dawson
- Education: Florida A&M University (BS)

Ramon J. Alexander (born October 19, 1984) is an American politician who served as a member of the Florida House of Representatives from 2016 to 2022. He represented the 8th district, which includes Gadsden County and sections of Tallahassee in Leon County since 2016. From 2018 to 2020, Alexander served as Democratic whip.

He graduated from Florida A&M University with a Bachelor of Science degree in 2007. He is married to Taniyah Alexander.

On May 11, 2022, Alexander was accused of sexual harassment by a male former employee of Florida A&M University. The victim stated that Alexander had groped him and sent sexually explicit photos and videos. Alexander acknowledged his sexual relationship with the man, but that it was consensual. Alexander resigned as Democratic co-leader days after the Tallahassee Democrat reported on the allegations and announced that he would not run for re-election.
