= Pat Thomas (politician) =

American politician

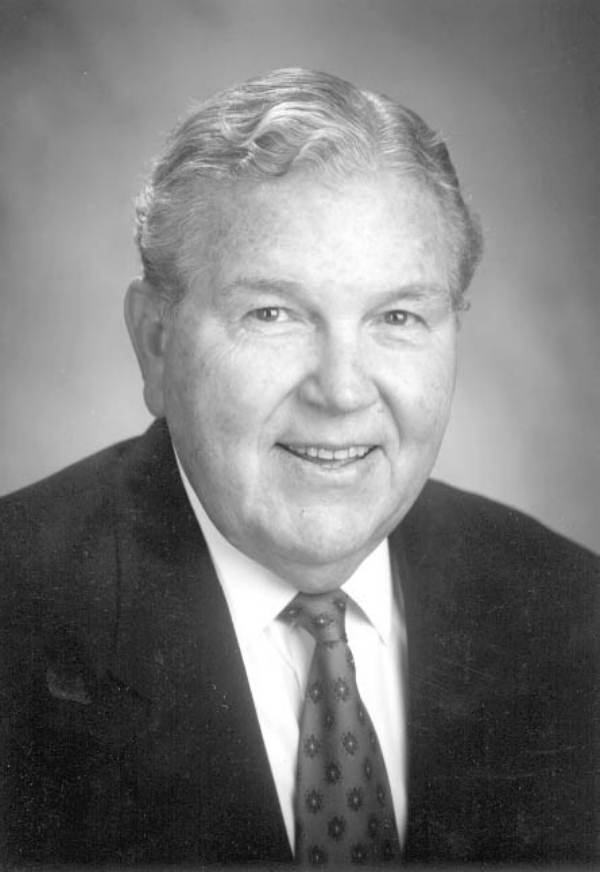

President of the Florida Senate
- In office October 12, 1993 – November 22, 1994
- Preceded by: Ander Crenshaw
- Succeeded by: James A. Scott

Member of the Florida Senate
- In office November 19, 1974 – November 21, 2000
- Preceded by: Mallory E. Horne
- Succeeded by: Al Lawson
- Constituency: 4th (1974–1982); 2nd (1982–1992); 3rd (1992–2000)

Member of the Florida House of Representatives from the 10th district
- In office 1972–1974
- Preceded by: Robert Davidson Woodward
- Succeeded by: James Harold Thompson

Personal details
- Born: November 23, 1933 Quincy, Florida
- Died: June 21, 2000 (aged 66) Quincy, Florida
- Cause of death: Cancer
- Party: Democratic
- Spouse: Mary Ann Jolley
- Children: 2
- Education: University of Florida (BS)

Military service
- Allegiance: United States
- Branch/service: United States Army
- Battles/wars: Korean War

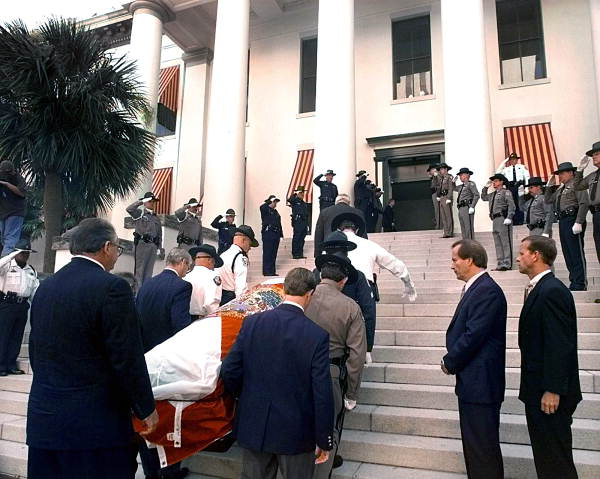
Pallbearers carry the coffin of Pat Thomas

Pat Thomas (November 21, 1933 – June 21, 2000) was an American politician in the state of Florida. He was a member of the Florida Senate, serving as the president of the senate between 1993 and 1994 and as president pro tempore from 1992 to 1993.

== Political career ==
Thomas was chair of the Democratic Party of Florida from 1966 to 1970. In October 1974, Thomas unseated the sitting representative for District 10 in the Florida House of Representatives, Jack Burke, in the Democratic primary. He won the general election in November 1972. The following spring, he was one of a bipartisan group of representatives who voted not to ratify the Equal Rights Amendment, which lost 64-54, making Florida the 13th state to oppose ratification of the amendment. He served in the State House of Representatives from 1972 to 1974. In 1974 he ran for the State Senate. While he won the primary in early September, he did not receive a majority of the votes, forcing a runoff at the beginning of October. He defeated Duby Ausley in the runoff primary on October 1, to become the Democratic nominee for the State Senate in District fourth district. Since there was no Republican running for the seat, he was guaranteed election in the November general election.

Thomas served in the Florida Senate until his death in 2000. Thomas finished his last legislative session in May 2000 and would have retired after the November elections that same year, due to term limits, however, he died from cancer in June. He was the second longest serving member of the Florida legislature at that time.

The St. Petersburg Times called him a "courteous, gracious Southern gentleman who rarely expressed anger or partisanship in an arena that is often filled with both." The Times went on to quote Governor Jeb Bush calling Thomas "a highly respected legislator" whose "good nature and passion for life and public service endeared him to so many." While House Speaker John Thrasher said of Thomas: "In an environment that can often be tense and partisan, he never forgot the overriding importance of friendship, regardless of party affiliation."

=== Major legislative achievements ===
The Old Florida Capitol building was saved from the wrecking ball after Thomas sponsored a 1978 bill to save it. A Korean War veteran, Thomas also led the fight for a Korean War Memorial, which was completed in December 1999. In 1996, Thomas plotted with then Governor Lawton Chiles and Senator Childers to save a law that helped the state file suit against tobacco companies on behalf of Medicaid patients. They hatched the plan in a Quincy restaurant housed in an old tobacco warehouse.

== Personal ==
Outside of his public service, he was an Insurance Executive and Mortgage Broker. He loved to hunt, fish and go boating. Thomas graduated from Quincy High school, after which he also graduated from the University of Florida with a BSA in 1957. Thomas was a member of Future Farmers of America while in high school and Florida Blue Key, Alpha Gamma Rho President and Senior class President while at the University of Florida. He was married to Mary Ann Jolley of Naples, Florida and had two children. Thomas was a member and past president of BPOE and Rotary. During the Korean War, Thomas served in the U.S. Army. He died of multiple myeloma.

== Highlights ==
One of Florida's Five Outstanding Young Men, 1967; National Junior Chamber of Commerce's nominee as Outstanding Young Man of America, 1967; DeMolay Legion of Honor; Allen Morris Awards: Most Outstanding First-Term Member of the Senate, 1976; Most Effective in Debate, 1981 and 1986; Most Effective in Committee, 1983 and 1986; Most Respected Senate Member 1990 runner-up.

== Memorials ==
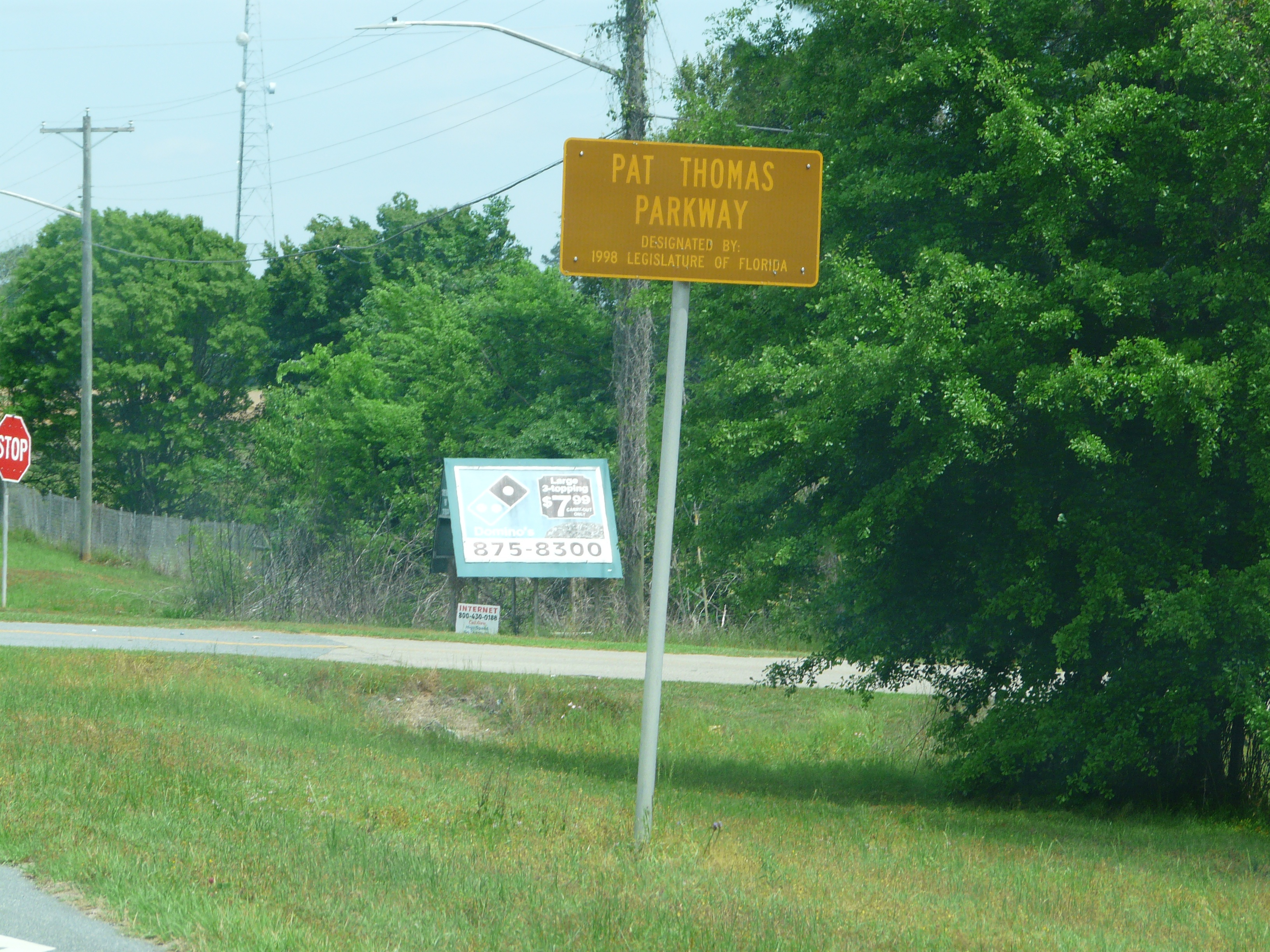
Signage for the Pat Thomas Parkway

A section of Florida State Road 267 in Gadsden County, Florida was designated the Pat Thomas Parkway in 1998. A park on Lake Talquin in Gadsden County is named Pat Thomas Park.

Florida House of Representatives
Preceded by R. D. Woodward Jr.	Member of the Florida House of Representatives from the 10th district 1972–1974	Succeeded by James Harold Thompson
Florida Senate
Preceded by Mallory Horne	Member of the Florida Senate from the 4th district 1974–1982	Succeeded by Karen Thurman
Preceded by Thomas J. Tobiassen	Member of the Florida Senate from the 2nd district 1982–1992	Succeeded by Betty Holzendorf
Preceded by Vincent Michael Bruner	Member of the Florida Senate from the 3rd district 1992–2000	Succeeded by Al Lawson
Political offices
Preceded by Ander Crenshaw	President of the Florida Senate; 1993–1994	Succeeded by James A. Scott
