= Ashenafi Kebede =

Ethiopian composer, conductor and musicologist (1938–1998)

- Born: 1938; Addis Ababa, Ethiopia
- Died: May 8, 1998 (aged 59–60); Tallahassee, Florida, U.S.
- Education: Eastman School of Music (1962); Wesleyan University (M.A. 1969; Ph.D. 1971)
- Occupation: Composer
- Known for: National Composer of Ethiopia

Ashenafi Kebede (Amharic: አሸናፊ ከበደ; 1938 – May 8, 1998) was an Ethiopian composer, conductor, ethnomusicologist, historical musicologist, music educator, novelist, and poet.

== Early life ==
Born in 1938 in Addis Ababa, Ethiopia. Ashenafi was educated in musicology in the United States at the Eastman School of Music (1962), and at Wesleyan University where he obtained his M.A. in 1969 and Ph.D. in 1971.

Ashenafi's mother, Fantaye Nekere, was an artistic individual and an early source of inspiration for young Ashenafi. She taught Ashenafi about Ethiopian artistic forms such as poetry and verse, which he later drew upon for his work.

His paternal grandfather was Liqe Mekuwas Adinew Goshu, a renowned hero of the Battle of Adwa and a close confidant of Empress Taitu. His great-grandfather, Dejazmach Goshu, served as a mentor and teacher to Emperor Tewodros II.

== Career ==
After obtaining his B.A. in music. Ashenafi returned to Addis Ababa, where he served as the first director of the Yared School of Music from 1963 to 1968.

During his visit in Budapest in 1967, its daily newspaper introduced him as the only African composer known to the European world. Hungarian critics nicknamed him the “Black Kodály” after their composer and educator, Zoltán Kodály (1882–1967). Emperor Haile Selassie designated Ashenafi as “National Composer” and awarded him the Haile Selassie I Foundation Grant for Outstanding Achievement in Cultural Affairs that same year. Shortly after that he furthered his studies in the United States, at Wesleyan University in ethnomusicology. During his studies in 1969, he released an LP Record entitled The Music of Ethiopia: Azmari music of the Amharas.

After the overthrow of Emperor Haile Selassie's government in 1974, Ashenafi decided to settle permanently in the United States with his family. Ashnenafi Kebede held several positions at American institutions, including assistant professor and director of the Ethnomusicology Program at Queens College in New York from 1970 to 1976; professor of music and director of the Center for African American Culture at the Florida State University in Tallahassee from 1977 to 1998. He was also director of the Ethiopian Research Council. Ashenafi was executive officer of Ethius, Inc.; and chair of the International Arts Council for African and Afro-American Affairs. He received Fulbright awards, as well as grants from the Florida Fine Arts Council, the National Endowment for the Humanities, the Canadian National Music Council, the American Council of Learned Societies, and the UNESCO.

Ashenafi was a prolific writer. His works include a novel, Confession (1964), articles in ethnomusicology journals, the book Roots of Black Music, and numerous articles in The Chronicler, the magazine of the Center for African-American Culture.

In his own compositions he combined Ethiopian and Japanese musical ideas. "Koturasia" is one such piece, written for flute, clarinet, violin, and Japanese koto. Among his other musical compositions were "Peace unto Ethiopia" and "The Life of Our Nation". His best-known composition, though rarely heard outside Ethiopia, was "The Shepherds Flute", performed in 1968 with the Bulgarian Symphonic Orchestra.

Ashenafi spoke of his physical and mental isolation in the United States during the late 1970s and 1980s.

== Legacy ==
Ashenafi died in Tallahassee, Florida, May 8, 1998. He left behind a son, Yared Ashenafi and three daughters; Nina Ashenafi Richardson, a judge, married to Tallahassee City Commissioner Curtis Richardson; Samrawit Ashenafi; and Senait Ashenafi, an actress.

The Ashenafi Kedebe Performing Arts Center was inaugurated in 2024 at the Yared School of Music by prime minister Abiy Ahmed, named after Ashenafi in part due to his time at the music school as its first director.

== Selected writings ==
=== Articles ===
- "The Krar". Archived from the original on 2007-08-16., Ethiopian Observer, 196x. (version archived 2007)
- "The Bowl-Lyre of Northeast Africa. Krar: The Devil's Instrument", Ethnomusicology, Vol. 21, No 3 (September 1977), pp 379–395.
- "The Azmari, Poet-musician of Ethiopia", The Musical Quarterly LXI(1), 1975, Oxford University Press.
- Review of "Ethiopia III: Three Chordophone Traditions by Cynthia Kimberlin, Jerome Kimberlin", Ethnomusicology, Vol. 34, No 1 (Winter, 1990), pp 196–198.
- "A History of Music". Archived from the original on 2006-09-13., article in Addis Ababa University Alumni Association Newsletter. Contains "Saint Yared: Ethiopia's Great Ecclesiastic Composer, Poet and Priest", "Sacred Musical Instruments at the Horn of Africa", and more. (archived 2006)
- "Zemenawi muzika: modern trends in traditional secular music of Ethiopia", The Black Perspective in Music, Vol 4, No 3., pp 291–301, 1976.
- "Musical innovation and acculturation in Ethiopian culture", African Urban Studies, vol. 6., pp 77–87, 1979.
- "Zur Geschichte der Amhara-Musik in Äthiopien" [tr. "On the History of Amhara Music in Ethiopia"], Musikgeschichte in Bildern ("Music History in Pictures") monograph series, Number 1, Ostafrika [East Africa], edited by Gerhard Kubik, Deutscher Verlag für Musik, Leipzig, pp 11–14, 1982.
- "The Sacred Chant of Ethiopian Monotheistic Churches: Music in Black Jewish and Christian Communities", The Black Perspective in Music, Vol. 8, No. 1 (Spring, 1980), pp. 21–34

=== Dissertation ===
- The Music of Ethiopia: Its Development and Cultural Setting. Ph.D. Dissertation, Wesleyan University, 1971.

=== Books ===
- Confession: the most exciting, heart-breaking story of an Ethiopian in the United States, 1960.
- Roots of Black music: the vocal, instrumental, and dance heritage of Africa and Black America. Prentice-Hall, 1982. ISBN 0-13-783159-5.

== Selected musical works ==
- The Shepherd Flutist / Ethiopian Symphony, Musika Ethiopia, 1968.
- The Music of Ethiopia: Azmari music of the Amharas, 1969.

== Selected scores ==
- Koturasia for Koto, Violin and B-Flat Clarinet with Idiophonic Interjection in the Japanese Low Hira-joshi Tonality, composed by Ashenafi Kebede. G. Schirmer, 1974.
- Minuet for Flutes and Pipes (In the spirit of Ethiopian washints and embiltas) also known as "Fantasy for Aerophones: Ethiopian Washint and Japanese Shakuhachi" [1967].
- Mot (Death)-Soliloquy II for 2 sopranos, 1 flute, and 2 Kotos, composed by Ashenafi Kebede in Western notation with Amharic text 1974. Unpublished.
