= Ron Johnson (Florida politician) =

American politician

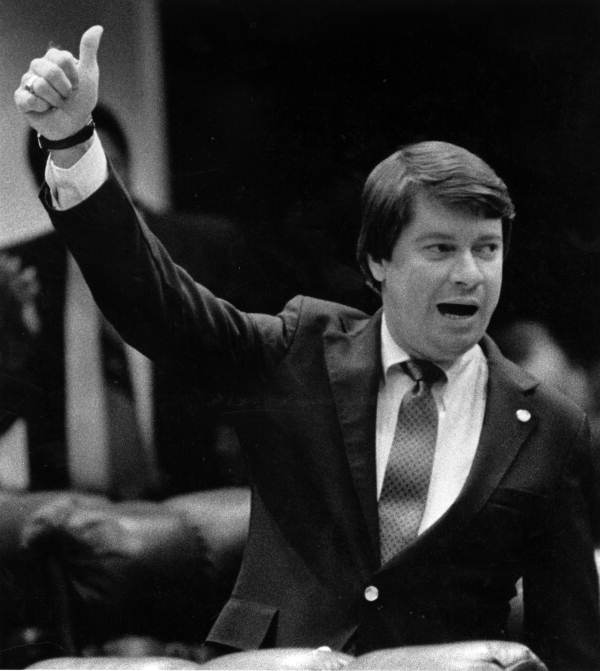
- Johnson in 1986

Member of the Florida House of Representatives
- In office November 7, 1978 – November 6, 1990
- Preceded by: Earl Hutto
- Succeeded by: Scott Clemons
- Constituency: 8th District (1978–1982); 6th District (1982–1990)

Personal details
- Born: September 29, 1949 Brewton, Alabama, U.S.
- Died: April 2, 2018 (aged 68) Tallahassee, Florida, U.S.
- Party: Democratic
- Occupation: Consultant

Ronald Clyde Johnson (September 29, 1949 - April 2, 2018) was an American politician in the state of Florida.

Johnson was born in Alabama and came to Florida in 1952. He was a business and public relations consultant. He served in the Florida House of Representatives for the 8th district from November 7, 1978, to November 2, 1982, and the 6th district from November 2, 1982, to November 6, 1990, as a Democrat.
