= Scott Clemons =

American politician

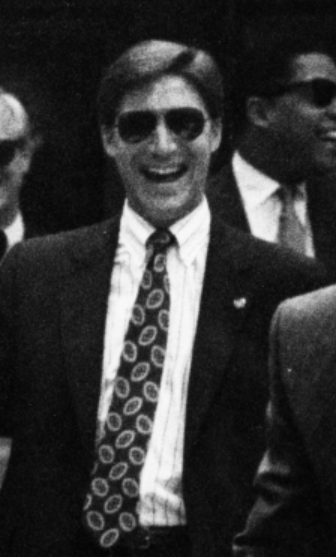

Member of the Florida House of Representatives from the 6th district
- In office November 6, 1990 – November 3, 1998
- Preceded by: Ron Johnson
- Succeeded by: Allan Bense

Personal details
- Born: February 13, 1960 (age 66) Panama City
- Party: Democratic
- Spouse: Pat Boss
- Children: 2

Scott Clemons (born February 13, 1960) is an American politician of the Democratic Party. He is the former mayor of Panama City, Florida, and the former state representative for the 6th district from November 6, 1990, to November 3, 1998.

While in the Florida Legislature, Clemons served as freshman class president, chairman of the telecommunications and utilities committee, and vice chairman of the banking and corporations committee. In the spring of 1998, Clemons announced his intent not to seek re-election in order "to focus on his business and spend more time with his family."

Clemons was born on February 13, 1960, in Panama City, Florida, and raised there as well. He graduated from Bay High School where he served as student body president. and attended the University of the South, where he served as president of the Student Assembly and received a B.A. He then went to Mercer University where he earned a J.D. degree.

After receiving his Juris Doctor, Clemons returned to Panama City and worked for the law offices of Bryant, Higby & Williams, concentrating primarily in insurance defense. Clemons currently serves as the president of The Clemons Company, Inc., an insurance agency, which was founded by his father, Gerry Clemons, in 1957. Clemons joined the company in 1991.

Clemons' charitable and civic service activities include positions on the board of directors of the United Way, Early Childhood Services, and Bay County Chamber of Commerce. Statewide service includes an appointment to the Florida Commission on Ethics.

Clemons is married to his wife, the former Pat Boss, and they have two children Katherine and Olivia.

In 2010, Clemons was one of a handful of prominent Florida Democrats to break with his party and endorse the Independent US Senate candidacy of Governor Charlie Crist, a former Republican, rather than Democratic nominee Kendrick Meek .

== 2007 Mayoral Election ==
After four successful runs as for the state legislature, Scott Clemons returned to politics when he announced in early 2007 his intentions to run against incumbent mayor Lauren DeGeorge. Two other men, Cliff Fleming and veteran city commissioner Bob Barnard also entered the race.

The News Herald reported on April 8, 2007, that Clemons was well in the lead for fundraising with the campaign. Clemons had raised $73,800; Barnard had raised $50,020; Fleming had raised $13,750 and the incumbent had raised $4,270.

Clemons and DeGeorge were the top vote getters in the April 17, 2007, initial election. Clemons went on to defeat DeGeorge in the May 15, 2007, runoff election. After the runoff election, new mayor Clemons made positive press when he offered to pay Boy Scout troops for the signs that they picked up.

Panama City Mayoral Election, April 17, 2007
Party	Candidate	Votes	%	±%
NPA	Scott Clemons	2,546	42.9	
NPA	Lauren DeGeorge	1,354	22.8	
NPA	Cliff Fleming	1,043	17.6	
NPA	Bob Barnard	986	16.6	

Panama City Mayoral Run-Off Election, May 15, 2007
Party	Candidate	Votes	%	±%
NPA	Scott Clemons	3,371	60.7	
NPA	Lauren DeGeorge	2,181	39.29	
