= Earl Hutto =

American politician (1926–2020)

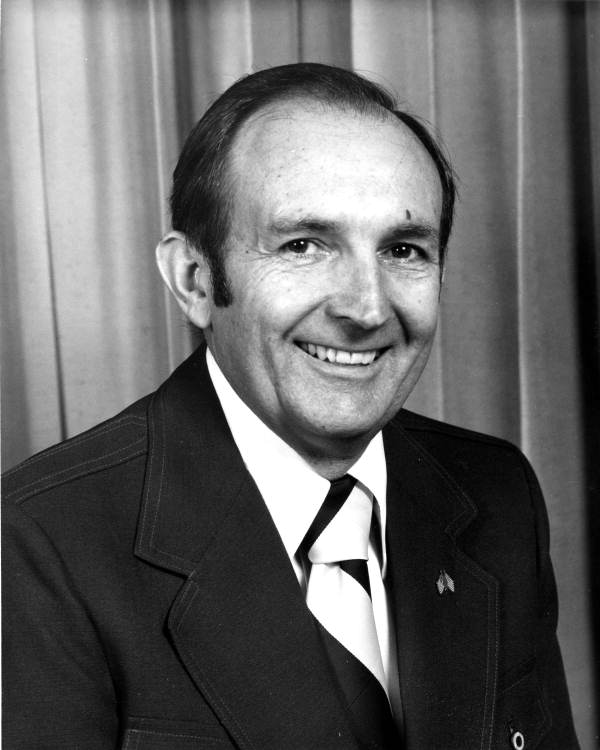

Member of the U.S. House of Representatives from Florida's 1st district
- In office January 3, 1979 – January 3, 1995
- Preceded by: Bob Sikes
- Succeeded by: Joe Scarborough

Member of the Florida House of Representatives from the 8th district
- In office November 7, 1972 – November 2, 1978
- Preceded by: Billy Joe Rish
- Succeeded by: Ron Johnson

Personal details
- Born: Earl Dewitt Hutto; May 12, 1926 Midland City, Alabama, U.S.
- Died: December 14, 2020 (aged 94) Pensacola, Florida, U.S.
- Party: Democratic
- Spouse: Nancy Myers (m. 1967)
- Earl Hutto's voice Earl Hutto speaks in support of a Flag-burning amendment Recorded June 12, 1990

Earl Dewitt Hutto (May 12, 1926 – December 14, 2020) was an American politician and sports director who served as a member of the United States House of Representatives representing Florida's 1st congressional district from 1979 to 1995. He was a member of the Democratic Party.

== Early life ==
Born in Midland City, Alabama, to Lemmie and Ellie (nee Mathis) Hutto, Earl attended Dale County public schools and received a Bachelor of Science from Troy State University (formerly Troy State Teachers College) in 1949. He served in the United States Navy from 1944 to 1946. Afterward he returned to graduate school, studying broadcasting at Northwestern University in 1951. He worked as sports director at WEAR-TV in Pensacola, Florida from 1954 to 1961, WSFA-TV in Montgomery, Alabama from 1961 to 1963, and WJHG-TV in Panama City, Florida, from 1961 to 1973. He operated an advertising agency from 1973 to 1979.

== Political career ==
Hutto was elected as a Democrat to the Florida House of Representatives in 1972 and was reelected in 1974 and 1976. He was elected in 1978 to the 96th and to the seven succeeding Congresses, serving from January 3, 1979, to January 3, 1995. He decided not to run as a candidate in 1994 for reelection to the 104th Congress.

Hutto was one of the most conservative Democrats in Congress. This was not surprising given the nature of his district. It moved away from its "Solid South" roots somewhat sooner than the rest of Florida; its white voters had begun splitting their tickets as early as the 1950s. However, Hutto usually skated to reelection for most of his tenure, with Republicans usually fielding nominal challengers the few times they fielded candidates at all.

From 1978 to 1988, Hutto never dropped below 61 percent of the vote, easily winning reelection even in years when Republican presidential candidates carried the 1st in landslides. In 1984, for instance, he was completely unopposed for reelection even as Ronald Reagan carried the district with over 70 percent of the vote. In 1988, as George H. W. Bush carried the 1st by a similar margin to the one Reagan scored four years earlier, Hutto was reelected with 66 percent of the vote.

He voted against the Comprehensive Anti-Apartheid Act in 1986.

In 1990, Republican challenger Terry Ketchel held Hutto to 52 percent of the vote in the district's first competitive contest in recent memory. Hutto defeated Ketchel in a rematch in 1992, but was once again held to only 52 percent of the vote. He opted not to run for reelection in 1994, and was succeeded by Republican Joe Scarborough. Proving just how Republican this district is, Hutto was the last Democrat to win over 40 percent of the district's vote, or win a county in the district, until Gay Valimont in the 2025 special election.

Hutto joined the bipartisan ReFormers Caucus in 2017.

== Death ==
Hutto died on December 14, 2020 at the age of 94.

U.S. House of Representatives
Preceded by Robert Sikes	Member of the U.S. House of Representatives from Florida's 1st congressional district 1979–1995	Succeeded by Joe Scarborough
