= Leonard Hall (Florida politician) =

American politician

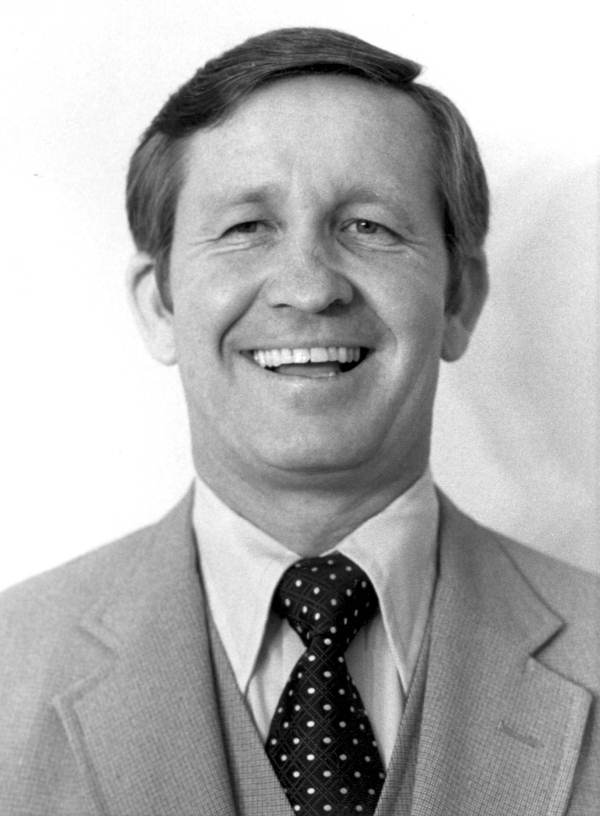

Member of the Florida House of Representatives from the 9th district
- In office November 7, 1978 – November 2, 1982
- Preceded by: William J. Rish
- Succeeded by: Al Lawson

Personal details
- Born: January 29, 1943 (age 83) Tifton, Georgia, U.S.
- Party: Democratic
- Children: two
- Occupation: teacher/real estate

Leonard J. Hall (born January 23, 1943) was an American politician in the state of Florida.

Hall was born in Tifton, Georgia and came to Florida in 1950. He served in the Florida House of Representatives from November 7, 1978, to November 2, 1982 (9th district).
