= Joe Chapman (politician) =

American politician (1938–2016)

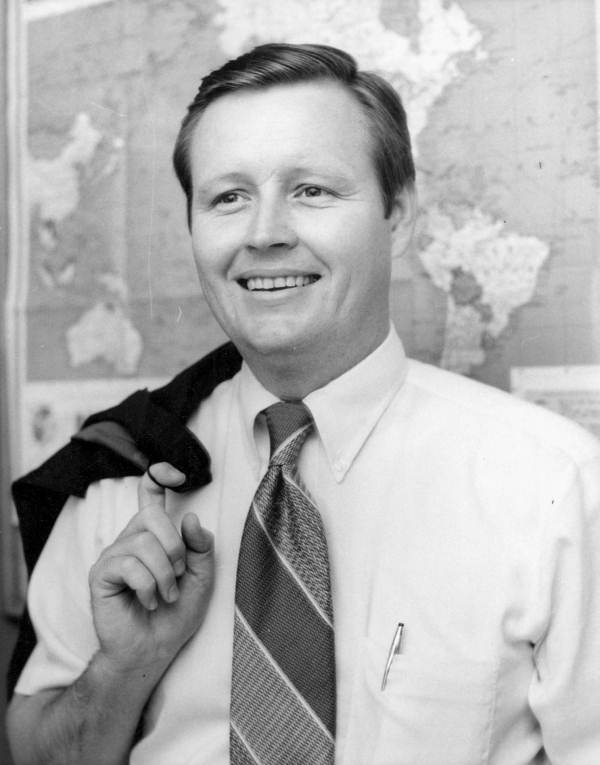
- Chapman in 1968

Member of the Florida House of Representatives from the 9th district
- In office 1968–1972
- Preceded by: Ben Clarence Williams
- Succeeded by: Billy Joe Rish

Personal details
- Born: August 4, 1938
- Died: December 11, 2016 (aged 78)
- Party: Democratic
- Education: University of Florida; University of Florida College of Law

Joe Chapman (August 4, 1938 – December 11, 2016) was an American politician. He served as a Democratic member for the 9th district of the Florida House of Representatives.

== Life and career ==
Chapman attended the University of Florida and the University of Florida College of Law.

In 1968, Chapman was elected to represent the 9th district of the Florida House of Representatives, succeeding Ben Clarence Williams. He served until 1972, when he was succeeded by Billy Joe Rish.

Chapman died in December 2016, at the age of 78.
