= Allan Bense =

American businessman and politician

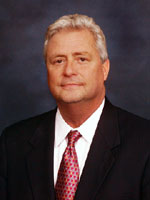

93rd Speaker of the Florida House of Representatives
- In office November 16, 2004 – November 21, 2006
- Preceded by: Johnnie Byrd
- Succeeded by: Marco Rubio

Member of the Florida House of Representatives from the 6th district
- In office November 3, 1998 – November 7, 2006
- Preceded by: Scott Clemons
- Succeeded by: Jimmy Patronis

Personal details
- Born: October 6, 1951 (age 74)
- Party: Republican
- Spouse: Tonie Johnson
- Profession: Businessman
- Religion: Methodist

Allan G. Bense (born October 6, 1951) is an American businessman and politician. He served in the Florida House of Representatives from 1998 to 2006. He serves as the chairman and chief executive officer of Bense Enterprises.

== Biography ==
=== Early life ===
Allan Bense was born in Panama City, Florida, on October 6, 1951, and the youngest child of Herbert and Bette Bense. Both of his parents died at the age of 45; he worked his way through junior high school, high school, and college as a janitor, waiter, mechanic, salesman, and heavy equipment operator. He received his MBA from Florida State University in 1974.

=== Career ===
He was a member of the Florida House of Representatives from 1998 through 2006. He was Speaker of the House from 2004 through 2006.

=== Personal life ===
He married his wife Tonie Johnson Bense in 1975, and they have three children. Bense's older sister, Judith A. Bense, was president of the University of West Florida.
