= Senait Ashenafi =

American actress

- Born: March 10, 1966 (age 60)
- Education: Florida State University
- Occupation: Actress
- Parent: Ashenafi Kebede

Senait Ashenafi (born March 10, 1966, in Addis Ababa) is an Ethiopian-born actress in the United States who played Keesha Ward in General Hospital from 1994 to 1998.

Senait was nominated for an NAACP Image Award for "Outstanding Actress In A Daytime Drama Series" at the 29th NAAC Image Awards in 1998.

Senait was featured in the bestselling book "Success Strategies for African-Americans - A Guide to Creating Personal and Professional Achievements" by Beatrice Nivens.

Senait has worked as a dancer, singer, and model. She is the daughter of the Ethiopian composer and ethnomusicologist Ashenafi Kebede and the sister of Nina Ashenafi Richardson, a judge in Florida.

Senait attended Florida State University in Tallahassee, where her father was a professor. She went on to be a guest star on shows such as A Different World, The Fresh Prince of Bel-Air, Mad About You, Amen, The Sinbad Show, Out All Night, Baghdad Cafe and The Ben Stiller Show.

Senait has starred in national and international commercials and print-ads for top companies such as Hilton, J. C. Penney, AT&T, Nexxus Shampoo, Toyota, Citibank, Merle Norman Cosmetics, Milky Way, Pringles, World of Curls, Joico Shampoo and Conditioner, Sprite, Chevy, Montgomery Ward, Miller Lite and Taco Bell.

Upon leaving the role of Keesha Ward on General Hospital in 1998, Senait went on to star in the movie, Honeybee, in 2001, where she portrayed a woman who dropped out of college to pursue a career in female boxing.
