= John Angus McDonald =

American politician

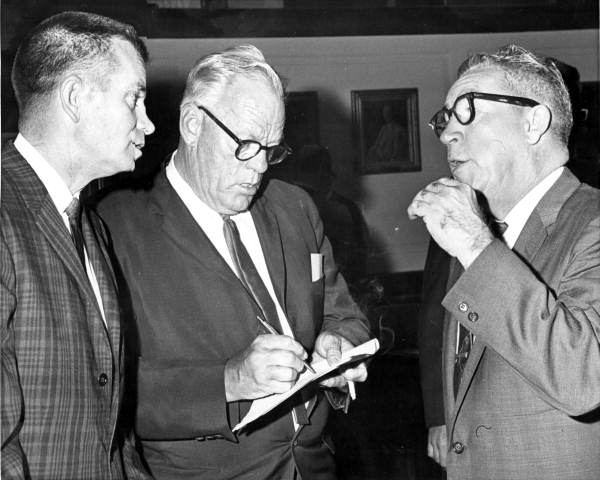
- McDonald (left) with Verle Pope and Bill Gautier, 1965

Member of the Florida Senate from the 3rd district
- In office 1965–1966
- Preceded by: Clyde Galloway
- Succeeded by: William Dean Barrow

Personal details
- Born: April 10, 1917 Pleasant Valley, Florida, U.S.
- Died: July 15, 2008 (aged 91) Gulf Breeze, Florida, U.S.
- Party: Democratic
- Education: Chipola College; Florida State University

John Angus McDonald (April 10, 1917 – July 15, 2008) was an American politician. He served as a Democratic member for the 3rd district of the Florida Senate.

== Life and career ==
McDonald was born in Pleasant Valley, Florida. He served in the United States Army during World War II, which after his discharge, he attended Chipola College, earning a degree. He also attended Florida State University, earning his BS degree in business management in 1957.

In 1964, McDonald was elected to represent the 3rd district of the Florida Senate, succeeding Clyde Galloway. He served until 1966, when he was succeeded by William Dean Barrow.

== Death ==
McDonald died on July 15, 2008, in Gulf Breeze, Florida, at the age of 91.
