= Senator Galloway =

Senator Galloway may refer to:

- Abraham Galloway (1837–1870), North Carolina State Senate
- Clyde Galloway (1925–2009), Florida State Senate
- Michael Galloway (politician) (born 1965), Texas State Senate
- Pam Galloway (born 1955), Wisconsin State Senate
- Shirley Galloway (born 1934), Washington State Senate
