= Amos Hays Davis =

American politician

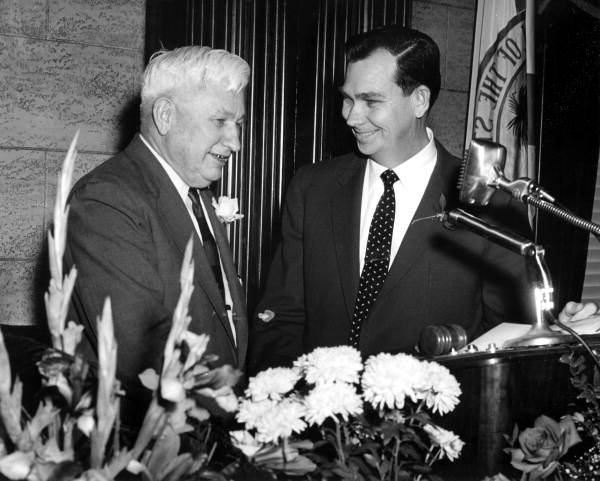
- Davis (left) with Thomas E. David, 1955

Member of the Florida House of Representatives from Gadsden County
- In office 1935–1948

Personal details
- Born: July 25, 1883 Greenwood, Florida, U.S.
- Died: July 8, 1962 (aged 78)
- Party: Democratic
- Education: Florida State College

Amos Hays Davis (July 25, 1883 – July 8, 1962) was an American politician. He served as a Democratic member of the Florida House of Representatives.

== Life and career ==
Davis was born in Greenwood in Jackson County before moving to Mount Pleasant in Gadsden County while still a child. He attended Florida State College. On April 9, 1914 he married Elizabeth Neal.

Davis served in the Florida House of Representatives from 1935 to 1948. He then served as the House Sergeant at Arms from 1951 to 1962.

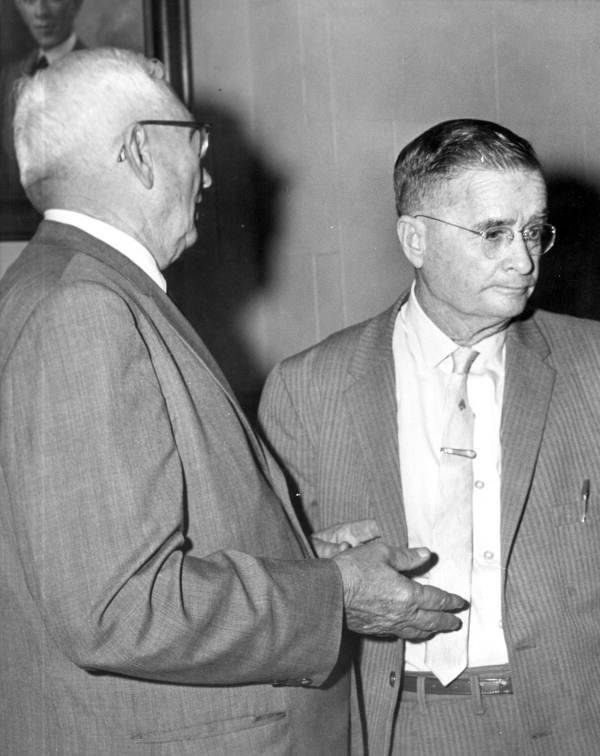
Davis (left) with Bert Riddle, 1961

Davis died July 8, 1962 in the Gadsden County hospital at the age of 78 after suffering a long illness. He was buried at Mount Pleasant cemetery and was survived by his wife and three children.
