= Vasilinda =

Vasilinda is a surname. Notable people with the surname include:

- Mike Vasilinda, American news reporter
- Michelle Rehwinkel Vasilinda (born 1960), American lawyer and politician, wife of Mike
