= Argenziano =

Argenziano is a surname. Notable people with the surname include:

- Carmen Argenziano (1943–2019), American actor
- Nancy Argenziano (born 1955), American politician
