= Senator Barrow =

Senator Barrow may refer to:

== Members of the United States Senate ==
- Alexander Barrow (1801–1846), U.S. Senator from Louisiana from 1841 to 1846
- Middleton P. Barrow (1839–1903), U.S. Senator from Georgia from 1882 to 1883

== United States state senate members ==
- Regina Barrow (born 1966), Louisiana State Senate
- Washington Barrow (1807–1866), Tennessee State Senate
- William Dean Barrow (1931–2013), Florida State Senate
