= Loranne Ausley =

American politician

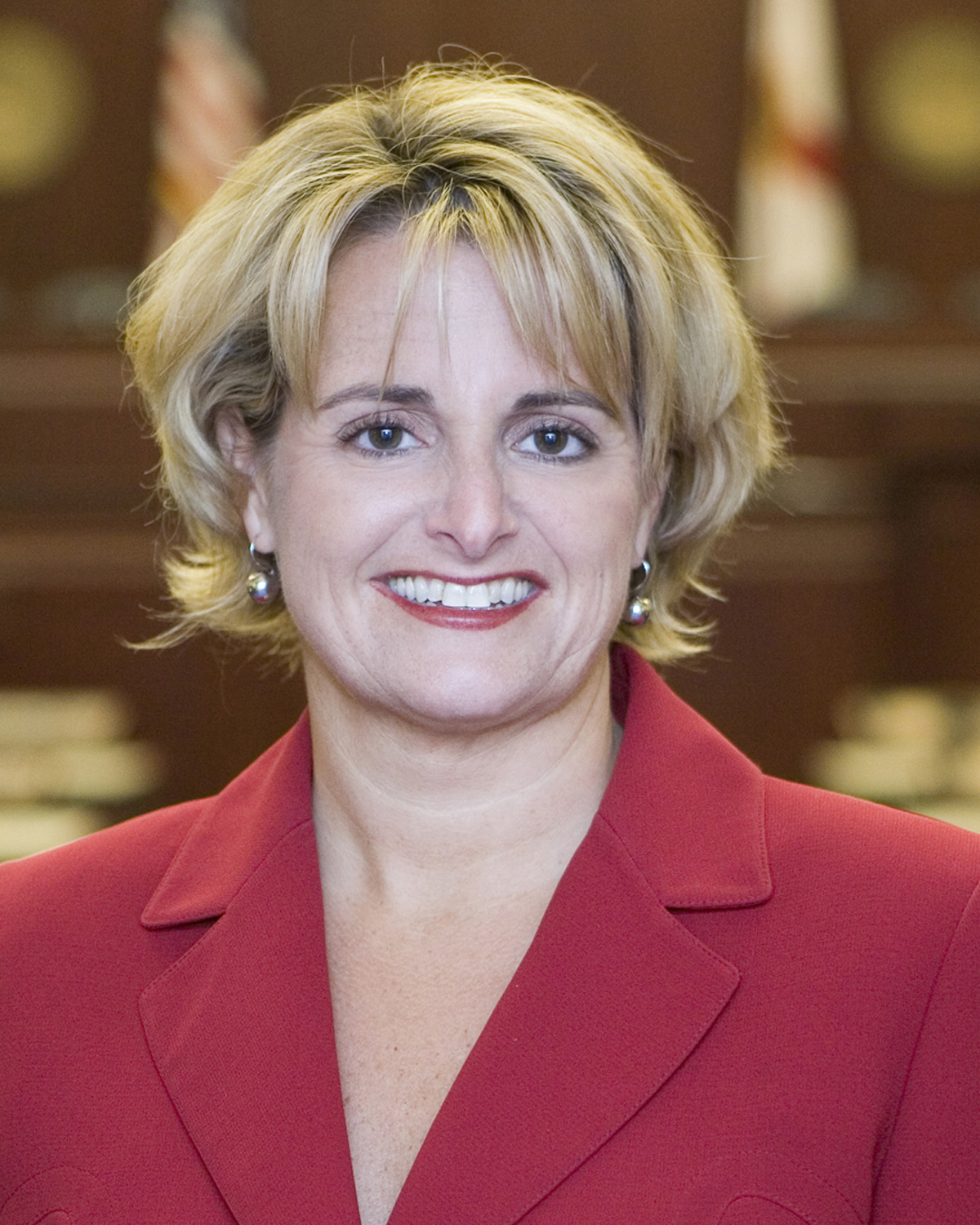

Member of the Florida Senate from the 3rd district
- In office November 3, 2020 – November 8, 2022
- Preceded by: Bill Montford
- Succeeded by: Corey Simon

Member of the Florida House of Representatives from the 9th district
- In office November 8, 2016 – November 3, 2020
- Preceded by: Michelle Rehwinkel Vasilinda
- Succeeded by: Allison Tant
- In office November 7, 2000 – November 4, 2008
- Preceded by: Marjorie Turnbull
- Succeeded by: Michelle Rehwinkel Vasilinda

Personal details
- Born: October 16, 1963 (age 63)
- Party: Democratic
- Spouse: Bill Hollimon
- Education: Randolph College (BA); Washington and Lee University (JD)

Loranne Ausley (born October 16, 1963) is an American attorney and Democratic politician from Tallahassee, Florida. She served as a member of the Florida Senate from 2020 until her defeat in 2022, representing Calhoun, Franklin, Gadsden, Gulf, Hamilton, Jefferson, Leon, Liberty, Madison, Taylor, and Wakulla Counties. Previously, she represented the Tallahassee area in the Florida House of Representatives from 2000 to 2008 and then again from 2016 to 2020. Ausley was defeated for re-election in 2022 by Republican Corey Simon.

== Early life and education ==
Ausley was born to a politically active family in Florida. Her great-great-grandfather was Alexander McSwain, a member of the Florida House of Representatives in 1891. Her grandfather, Charles Ausley, served in the Florida Senate. Ausley's father DuBose Ausley is a noted Tallahassee attorney who formally served as chair of the State University System of Florida DuBose Ausley. Her mother, Sallie Ausley, was co-founder of the Red Hills Horse Trials.

Ausley graduated from Randolph-Macon Woman's College with a Bachelor of Arts degree in 1985. She then attended Washington & Lee University where she received her J.D. in 1990.

== Political career ==
With over 20 years of public service at the state and federal level, Ausley was a member of the Florida House of Representatives from 2000 to 2008. Her district then included the northern half Leon County, including most of Tallahassee, and the northwest part of adjoining Jefferson County. Ausley was the ranking Democratic member on the House Health Care Council from 2007 to 2008.

=== 2010 Chief Financial Officer campaign ===
In the 2010 election, Ausley ran for Florida Chief Financial Officer (CFO). She became the Democratic nominee by default when no other candidates filed for the election, then went on to lose to State Senate President Jeff Atwater, the Republican nominee, in the general election.

Chief Financial Officer of Florida General Election, 2010
Party	Candidate	Votes	%
Republican	Jeff Atwater	2,967,052	57.33
Democratic	Loranne Ausley	2,015,579	38.94
Independent	Tom Stearns	109,192	2.11
Independent	Ken Mazzie	83,959	1.62
Total votes		5,175,782	100.0

After eight years out of elected office, Ausley returned to the Florida House in 2016, again representing the 9th district.

In 2020, Ausley ran for the Florida Senate in the 3rd district and succeeded term-limited incumbent Bill Montford. After a competitive race, she defeated Republican Marva Preston in the 2020 general election by a margin of 53.4–46.6%. She voted nay against the controversial Senate Bill 86 in 2021.

In 2022, Ausley questioned the need for a special session on the Reedy Creek Improvement Act, claiming it adds "insult to injury" and goes "after a private business." She also argued that Disney has made Florida "what it is."

Ausley ran in the 2026 Tallahassee mayoral election, where she was defeated in the runoff by City Commissioner Jeremy Matlow.

== Personal life ==
Loranne is married to Bill Hollimon and their children are John Hollimon (Stepson) and William DuBose Ausley Hollimon. She is a marathon runner and triathlete. Loranne's father is Tallahassee attorney DuBose Ausley of the 33-partner, 75-year-old law firm of Ausley & McMullen, P.A. She is a senior advisor to the Lawton Chiles Foundation and board chair of the Florida Healthy Kids Corporation.

On November 3, 2024, Ausley was involved in a serious bike accident while participating in a triathlon. She underwent surgery on her neck following the crash.

Party political offices
Preceded by Alex Sink	Democratic nominee for Chief Financial Officer of Florida; 2010	Succeeded by Will Rankin
