= Thomas David =

Thomas David may refer to:

- Tommy David (born 1948), Welsh rugby union and rugby league player
- Thomas Christian David (1925–2006), Austrian composer, conductor and flutist
- Thomas E. David, state legislator in Florida who served as Speaker of the Florida House of Representatives
