= Bert Riddle =

American politician

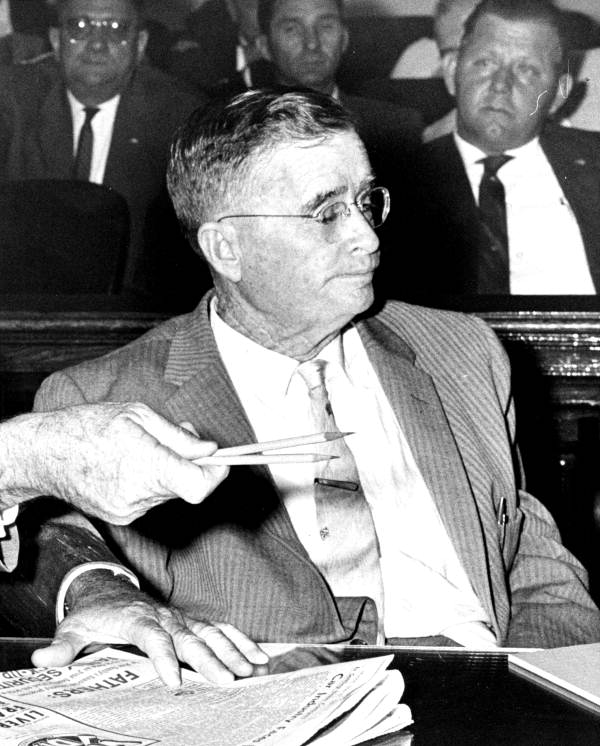
- Riddle in 1961

Member of the Florida House of Representatives from Holmes County
- In office 1921

Member of the Florida House of Representatives from Walton County
- In office 1941
- In office 1961 – May 24, 1961

Member of the Florida Senate from the 3rd district
- In office 1945–1947

Personal details
- Born: September 17, 1893
- Died: March 17, 1979 (aged 85)
- Party: Democratic

E. Bert Riddle (September 17, 1893 – March 17, 1979) was an American politician. He served as a Democratic member of the Florida House of Representatives. He also served as a member for the 3rd district of the Florida Senate.

Riddle was arrested on moral charges in October 1947 for improper conduct towards a 12-year-old girl in a school where he was the principal. He had already resigned as principal at the time of his arrest. He was tried the same month on October 23, found guilty and sentenced to three years in prison. He appealed the sentence to the Florida Supreme court and in January 1948 he qualified to stand for re-election to the senate. He lost both his bid for re-election and his appeal June 1948.

In January 1960 Riddle declared that he was going to run again for his senate seat, but in May he lost to Clyde Galloway. He then stood again for the House in the 1961 special general election in Broward County, Florida which he won in February.

Riddle was expelled unanimously from the House on May 24, 1961 after being accused of sending an indecent note to a 12-year-old female page. He was taken into custody by the police upon leaving the chamber but was later released with no formal charges.

He died on March 17, 1979, at the age of 85 at his home in Holmes County, Florida. He was survived by his wife, Ethel Riddle, and seven of his children.
