= William Dean Barrow =

American politician

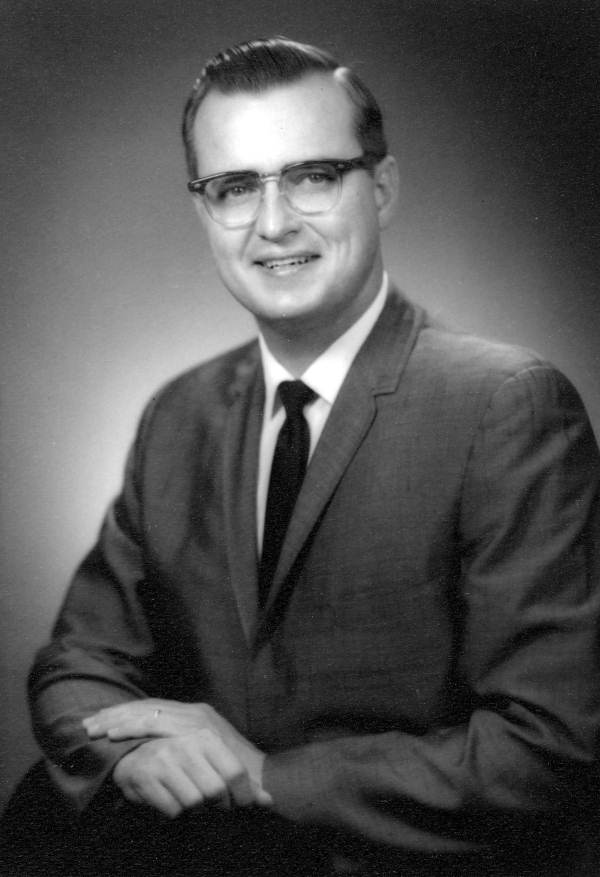
- Barrow in 1966

Member of the Florida Senate from the 3rd district
- In office 1966–1972
- Preceded by: John Angus McDonald
- Succeeded by: Dempsey Barron

Personal details
- Born: August 20, 1931 Pensacola, Florida, U.S.
- Died: March 31, 2013 (aged 81) Crestview, Florida, U.S.
- Party: Democratic
- Education: University of Florida

William Dean Barrow (August 20, 1931 – March 31, 2013) was an American politician. He served as a Democratic member for the 3rd district of the Florida Senate.

== Life and career ==
Barrow was born in Pensacola, Florida, the son of George Barron Sr. and Opal Colvin. He attended the University of Florida, earning his B.A. in political science and LL.B. degrees in 1953. After earning his degrees, he served as a judge advocate in the United States Air Force for two years.

In 1966, Barrow was elected to represent the 3rd district of the Florida Senate, succeeding John Angus McDonald. He served until 1972, when he was succeeded by Dempsey Barron.

== Death ==
Barrow died on March 31, 2013, in Crestview, Florida, at the age of 81.
