= Corey Simon =

American football player and politician (born 1977)

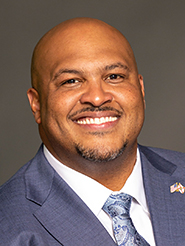

Member of the Florida Senate from the 3rd district
- Incumbent
- Assumed office November 8, 2022
- Preceded by: Loranne Ausley

Personal details
- Born: Corey Jermaine Simon; March 2, 1977 (age 49) Pompano Beach, Florida, U.S.
- Party: Republican
- Spouse: Natasha Givens (m. 2001)
- Children: 1
- Education: Florida State University (BS)
- Website: Campaign website
- Football career

No. 90, 97, 96
- Position: Defensive tackle

Personal information
- Listed height: 6 ft 0 in (1.83 m)
- Listed weight: 320 lb (145 kg)

Career information
- High school: Blanche Ely (Pompano Beach)
- College: Florida State (1996–1999)
- NFL draft: 2000: 1st round, 6th overall pick

Career history
- Philadelphia Eagles (2000–2004); Indianapolis Colts (2005–2006); Tennessee Titans (2007)

Awards and highlights
- Super Bowl champion (XLI); Pro Bowl (2003); PFWA All-Rookie Team (2000); BCS National Championship (1999); Consensus All-American (1999); ACC Brian Piccolo Award (1998); 2× First-team All-ACC (1998, 1999)

Career NFL statistics
- Total tackles: 246
- Sacks: 32
- Forced fumbles: 9
- Fumble recoveries: 3
- Stats at Pro Football Reference

Corey Jermaine Simon Sr. (born March 2, 1977) is an American politician and former professional football player. A member of the Republican Party, he has served as the Florida State Senator from the 3rd district since 2022. He played as a defensive tackle for eight seasons in the National Football League (NFL).

He played college football for the Florida State Seminoles, earned consensus All-American honors, and was a member of a BCS National Championship team. He was selected by the Philadelphia Eagles with the sixth overall pick in the 2000 NFL draft, and he played professionally for the Eagles, Indianapolis Colts and Tennessee Titans. He was selected to the 2004 Pro Bowl.

== Early life ==
Simon was born in Pompano Beach, Florida. He attended Blanche Ely High School, where he played for the Ely Mighty Tigers high school football team. As a senior, he was the Miami Herald's defensive player of the year, named to the All-USA squad by USA Today, and a Super Prep Dream Team selection.

== College career ==
Simon accepted an athletic scholarship to attend Florida State University, where he played for coach Bobby Bowden's Seminoles teams from 1996 to 1999. He was considered to be the most dominating defensive lineman in college football. Following his senior season, Simon was a first-team All-Atlantic Coast Conference (ACC) selection, and was recognized as a consensus first-team All-American. He was also a finalist for the Lombardi Award and Outland Trophy. He ended his career at FSU by helping his team win a BCS National Championship. His 44 tackles behind the line of scrimmage tied the Seminoles' career record set by Ron Simmons.

== Professional career ==
=== Philadelphia Eagles ===
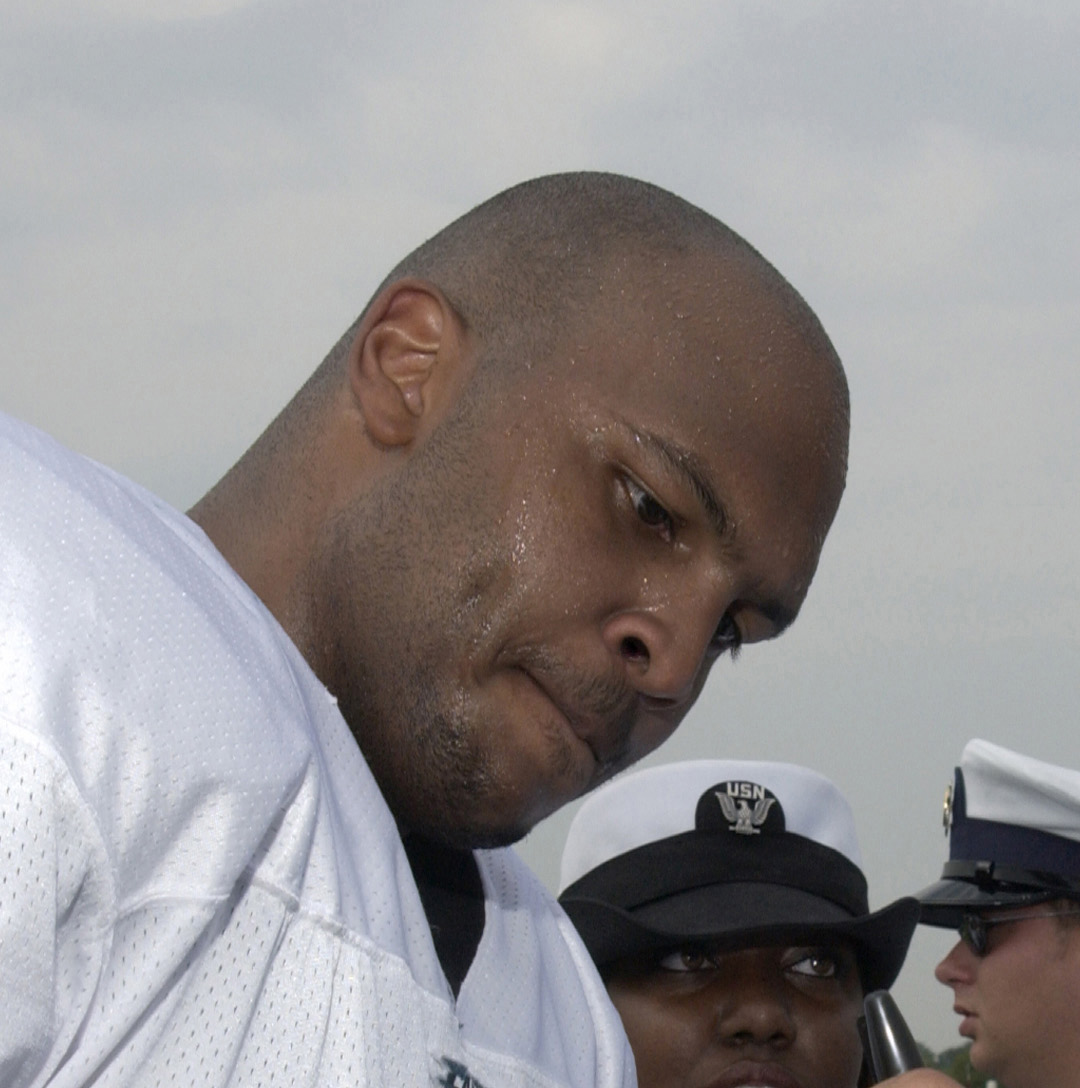
Simon in 2004

The Philadelphia Eagles selected him in the first round (sixth pick overall) of the 2000 NFL draft, and he played for the Eagles from 2000 until 2004. He started in four NFC Championship games during his six seasons with the Eagles. Philadelphia reached the Super Bowl once during these years, losing Super Bowl XXXIX to the New England Patriots, 24–21. After the 2004 season, the Eagles placed the franchise tag on Simon, which he refused to sign. After contract negotiations failed to produce a long-term deal, the Eagles lifted the franchise tag, making Simon an unrestricted free agent.

=== Indianapolis Colts ===
Simon signed with the Indianapolis Colts, for whom he played the entire 2005 season. In 2006, Simon underwent surgery, was placed on the Physically Unable to Perform / Non-Football Injury list during training camp, and did not play in any games. He did not attend Super Bowl XLI with other inactive players. However, he was still delivered a ring. He was once coined "the missing piece to the Super Bowl puzzle".

On August 1, 2007, Colts owner Jim Irsay stated that Simon's release from the team was imminent, once a settlement could be reached. The team announced Simon's release on August 4.

=== Tennessee Titans ===
On August 28, 2007, the Tennessee Titans signed Simon. On October 25, Simon announced that he was retiring from professional football after eight seasons in the NFL because of polyarthritis.

== NFL career statistics ==
Legend
	Won the Super Bowl
	Led the league
**Bold**	Career high

Year	Team	GP	Tackles				Fumbles		Interceptions					
Year	Team	GP	Cmb	Solo	Ast	Sck	FF	FR	Int	Yds	Avg	Lng	TD	PD
2000	PHI	**16**	**52**	**38**	**14**	**9.5**	2	**1**	0	0	0	0	0	**3**
2001	PHI	**16**	47	36	11	7.5	**4**	0	0	0	0	0	0	**3**
2002	PHI	14	40	33	7	2.0	0	**1**	0	0	0	0	0	**3**
2003	PHI	**16**	40	32	8	7.5	2	**1**	0	0	0	0	0	2
2004	PHI	**16**	32	26	6	5.5	0	0	0	0	0	0	0	1
2005	IND	13	34	25	9	0.0	1	0	0	0	0	0	0	2
2006	IND	0	Did not play											
2007	TEN	4	1	0	1	0.0	0	0	0	0	0	0	0	0
Total		95	246	190	56	32.0	9	3	0	0	0	0	0	14

== Political career ==
On June 13, 2022, Simon announced his candidacy for Florida's Third senatorial district, running as a Republican against Democrat Loranne Ausley, after being CEO of Volunteer Florida. Due to redistricting, the Florida Legislature redrew Florida's Third senatorial district boundaries to the east and reduced the Democratic advantage seen in previous elections. Simon had the backing and was recruited by Florida Governor Ron DeSantis, Senate President Kathleen Passidomo and Senator Ben Albritton, due to his association with Florida State University football. Simon canceled a debate with the Tallahassee Democrat and the League of Women Voters, labeling them a "liberal farce". Simon also accused Ausley and the Florida Democratic Party of funding racist advertisements depicting photos of children with nearby bullet holes and targets, as well as Simon in a target frame with stray bullets to the side. The flyer was produced by the Florida Democratic Legislative Campaign Committee, led by Minority Leader Lauren Book. Simon campaigned heavily against votes Ausley made during her time in the Florida Legislature such as voting against the Fairness in Women's Sports Act (SB 1028) which specifies that an athletic team or sport that is designated for females, women, or girls may not be open to students of the male sex, based on the student's biological sex listed on the student's official birth certificate at the time of birth. Simon also repeatedly went after her vote against the Parental Rights in Education Act, which prohibits "classroom instruction" on sexual orientation or gender identity in "kindergarten through grade 3 or in a manner that is not age appropriate or developmentally appropriate for students in accordance with state standards". On November 8, 2022, Simon defeated Ausley in the general election with 53% of the vote. Simon is the first African American Republican State Senator from Florida since Reconstruction.

=== Electoral history ===
==== 2022 ====
Florida Senate District 3 – General Election
Party	Candidate	Votes	%
**Republican**	**Corey Simon**	**113,477**	**52.98%**
Democratic	Loranne Ausley (incumbent)	100,696	47.02%
Total votes		**214,173**	**100.00%**
Republican **gain** from Democratic			

==== 2024 ====
Florida Senate District 3 – General Election
Party	Candidate	Votes	%
**Republican**	**Corey Simon**	**154,515**	**55.67%**
Democratic	Daryl Parks	123,025	44.33%
Total votes		**277,540**	**100.00%**
Republican **hold**			

== Personal life ==
In 2001, Simon married Natasha Givens. Together, the couple have a son, Corey Jr. (born 2003). He lives in Tallahassee.
