= 2010 Florida Chief Financial Officer election =

2010 Chief Financial Officer of Florida General Election
- November 2, 2010
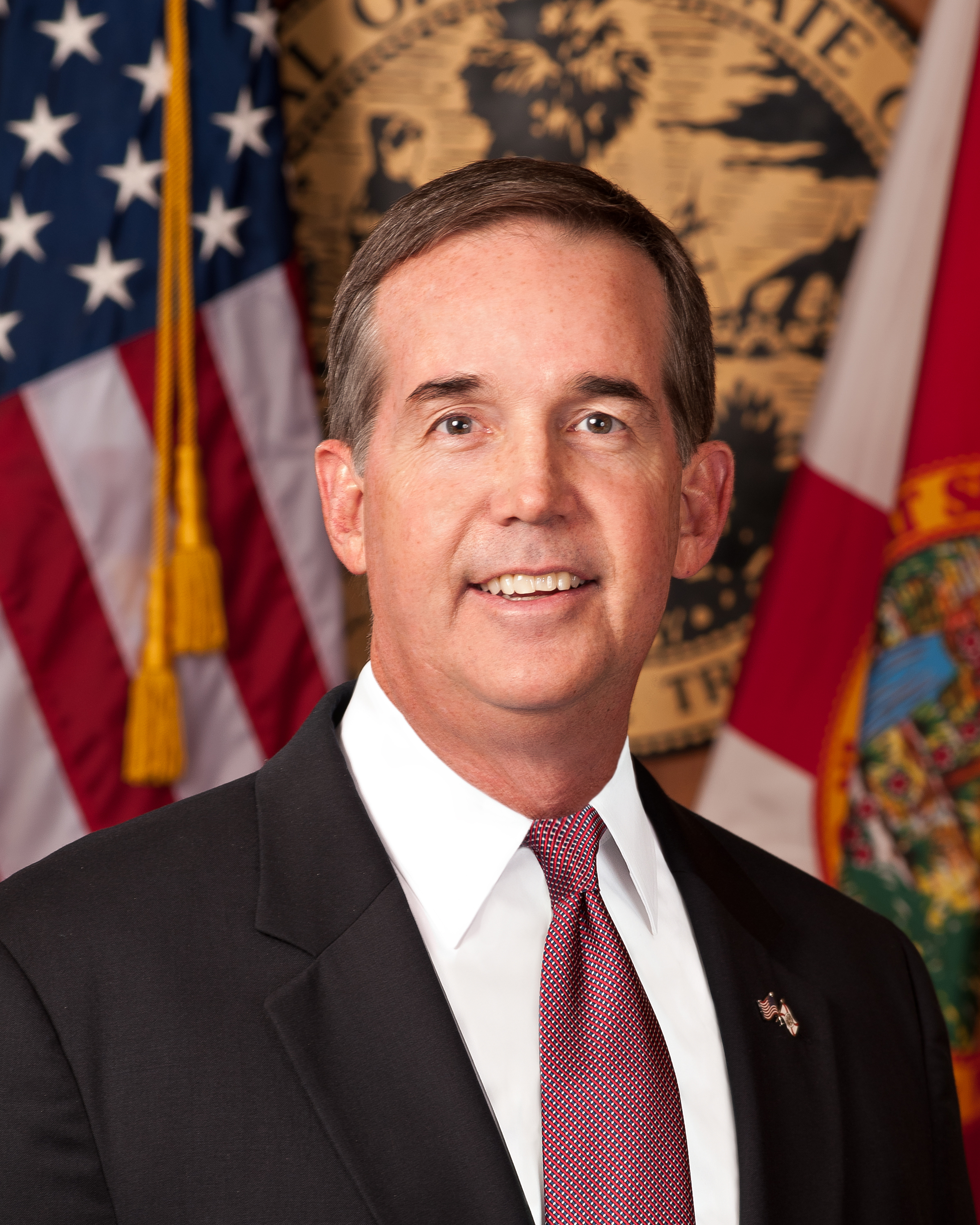

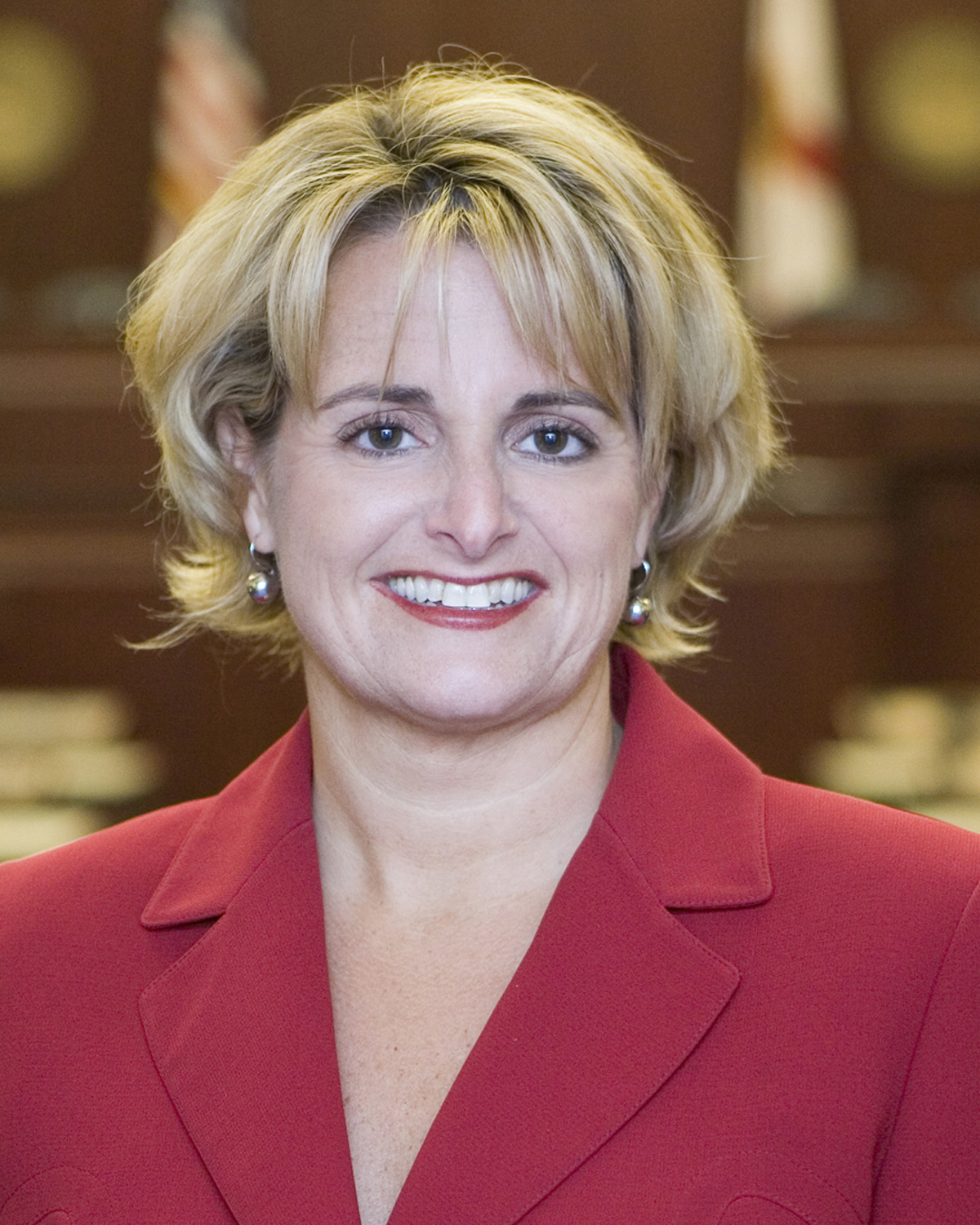
Nominee	Jeff Atwater	Loranne Ausley
Party	Republican	Democratic
Popular vote	2,967,052	2,015,579
Percentage	57.3%	38.9%
- Atwater: 30–40% 40–50% 50–60% 60–70% 70–80% 80–90% >90% Ausley: 30–40% 40–50% 50–60% 60–70% 70–80% 80–90% >90% Stearns: >90% Mazzie: >90% Tie: 30–40% 40–50% 50% No votes
CFO before election
Alex Sink
Democratic
Elected CFO
Jeff Atwater
Republican

The 2010 Florida Chief Financial Officer election took place on November 2, 2010, to elect the Chief Financial Officer of Florida. The election was won by Jeff Atwater who took office on January 4, 2011.

== Republican ==
Republican primary results
Party	Candidate	Votes	%
Republican	Jeff Atwater	986,566	100.0

== Democratic ==
Democratic primary results
Party	Candidate	Votes	%
Democratic	Loranne Ausley	802,408	100.0

Chief Financial Officer of Florida General Election, 2010
Party	Candidate	Votes	%
Republican	Jeff Atwater	2,967,052	57.33
Democratic	Loranne Ausley	2,015,579	38.94
Independent	Tom Stearns	109,192	2.11
Independent	Ken Mazzie	83,959	1.62
Total votes		5,175,782	100.0
Republican gain from Democratic			
