= Helen Spivey =

American politician

Helen Spivey (May 10, 1928 - April 20, 2022) was an American environmentalist and former member of the Florida House of Representatives. She grew up in New Jersey. In 1972 she moved to Crystal River, Florida. She was an advocate for manatees serving as Co-Chair of Save the Manatee Club’s Board of Directors, alongside Jimmy Buffett. She was an active member of the Democratic party.

She was succeeded in the Florida House by Nancy Argenziano. She was known as the Manatee Lady. In 2011, Spivey's conservation work was recognized by the United States House of Representatives when Congresswoman Debbie Wasserman Schultz celebrated Spivey receiving the U.S. Fish and Wildlife Service’s 2010 Regional Director’s Conservation Award.

On April 20, 2022, Helen Spivey died at the age of 94.
