= DuBose Ausley =

American politician

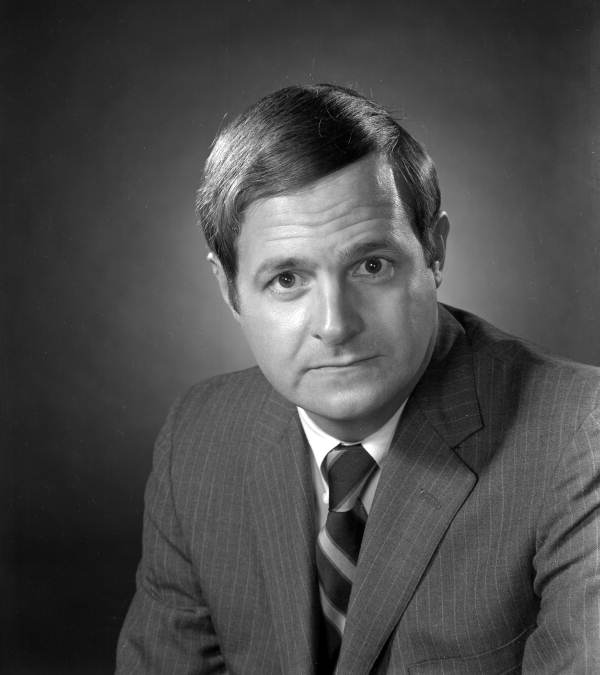

Chairman of the Florida Board of Regents
- In office 1981–1983

Personal details
- Born: May 13, 1937 (age 88) Tallahassee, Florida

DuBose Ausley (born May 13, 1937) is an attorney in Tallahassee, Florida, USA.

DuBose Ausley is the senior partner and former chairman with the law firm of Ausley & McMullen, P.A. in Tallahassee. He is also Director of TECO Energy, Inc. of Tampa, Florida, Director of Capital City Bank Group of Tallahassee, former member of Blue Cross and Blue Shield of Florida Board of Directors, Chairman of the Florida Commission on Ethics, and Chairman of the Florida Board of Regents in 1981.

== Background ==
Ausley's great-grandfather was Alexander McSwain, a member of the Florida House. His father was Charles S. Ausley, a member of the Florida Senate. Ausley is married to Sallie Ausley, co-founder of the Red Hills Horse Trials. His daughter is Loranne Ausley, member of the Florida House of Representatives (2000–2008, 2016–2020.) and State Senator for the Florida Senate 2020-current. Ausley previously served as a captain in the U.S. Army. He served on the United States Circuit Judge Nominating Commission. He also served on the Florida Council of 100, and was a member of the Florida Board of Regents from (1978–1994).

== Education ==
Ausley received his bachelor's degree from Washington & Lee University in 1959, and earned his Juris Doctor from the University of Florida in 1962.

Academic offices
Preceded by	Chairman of the Florida Board of Regents; 1981–1983	Succeeded by

== See also ==
- Florida Board of Regents
- State University System of Florida
