= Bill Montford =

American politician (born 1947)

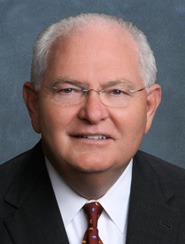

Member of the Florida Senate
- In office November 2, 2010 – November 3, 2020
- Preceded by: Al Lawson
- Succeeded by: Loranne Ausley
- Constituency: 6th district (2010–2012); 3rd district (2012–2020)

Personal details
- Born: William Jonas Montford III; August 22, 1947 (age 79) Marianna, Florida, U.S.
- Party: Democratic
- Spouse: Jane Gard Montford
- Children: Bill Montford, Katherine Montford Peters
- Education: Chipola Junior College (AA); Florida State University (BS) (MS)
- Profession: Superintendent

William Jonas Montford III (born August 22, 1947) is an American Democratic politician from Florida. He served in the Florida Senate from 2010 to 2020, representing parts of the Florida Panhandle around Tallahassee. Previously, he served on the Leon County Commission and as Leon County superintendent of schools.

== Background ==
Montford was born in Marianna, Florida (Jackson County), raised in Blountstown, Florida (Calhoun County), is an alumnus of Chipola College in Marianna, and received both undergraduate and graduate degrees from Florida State University in Tallahassee. For the past four decades, Bill Montford has been actively engaged in public education in Leon County and the Big Bend area.

Montford began his teaching career as a math teacher at Belle Vue Middle School in Tallahassee, Florida in 1969 and went on to serve as a school administrator for 26 years, including seven years as an assistant principal and 18 years as a high school principal at Godby High School and Lincoln High School.

In 1982, Montford successfully ran for Leon County Commission serving two consecutive terms. He ran for Superintendent of Leon County Schools in 1996. Montford serves as the Chief Executive Officer (CEO) of the Florida Association of District School Superintendents (FADSS).

In 2016, the Council of Florida College Presidents awarded him the Dr. James L. Wattenbarger Award for "his lifelong service to education".

Montford's wife Jane is a first-grade teacher in Leon County. They have two children, Bill IV and Katherine, and five grandchildren.

== Senate career ==
In 2010, Montford was elected to the Florida Senate from the 6th District, and was the Senate Minority Whip for 2010-2012. His district was renumbered the 3rd during redistricting in 2012. In 2016, he was re-elected with 67.4% of the vote over Republican challenger Nancy Miller. Montford stated that his priorities for the coming term would include education, “out-of-control testing," environmental protections, and a wage increase for state employees.

Montford serves on local and statewide boards including the Tallahassee Chamber of Commerce Executive Committee, Board of Directors and Chairs the Chamber's Governmental Affair Committee; The Mary Brogan Museum of Art and Science; Challenger Learning Center, the Florida Center for Performing Arts and Education, and The Village Square. He was appointed by Governor Charlie Crist to the Governor's Council on Physical Fitness and the Legislative Committee on Intergovernmental Relations.

Florida Senate
Preceded by Al Lawson	Member of the Florida Senate from the 6th district 2010–2012	Succeeded by John E. Thrasher
Preceded by Charles Dean	Member of the Florida Senate from the 3rd district 2012–2020	Succeeded by Loranne Ausley
