= Red Hills Horse Trials =

Annual equestrian event in Tallahassee, Florida, U.S.

Red Hills Horse Trials logo

The Red Hills Horse Trials is held in Tallahassee, in the U.S. state of Florida and is one of the equestrian world's top events. It is an annual major eventing competition held by the United States Eventing Association, Area III and the 16th event held in Area III consisting of Dressage, Cross-country, and Show jumping.

== History ==
Begun in 1998 under organizers Sallie Ausley (wife of DuBose Ausley) and Sylvia Ochs, it is named for the sloping terrain and rich red earth known as the Red Hills Region of north Florida and south Georgia. The RHHT, held in early March, draws over 40,000 spectators and visitors to view over 200 riders and their horses.

== Non-profit affiliations ==
Non-profit organizations that benefit from this event are Elinor Klapp-Phipps Park owned by the Northwest Florida Water Management District and managed by the city of Tallahassee, Tall Timbers Research Station to sustain science research, land conservation and educational initiatives, Tallahassee Friends of Our Parks Foundation and Red Hills Horse Camp for children.

== Venue ==
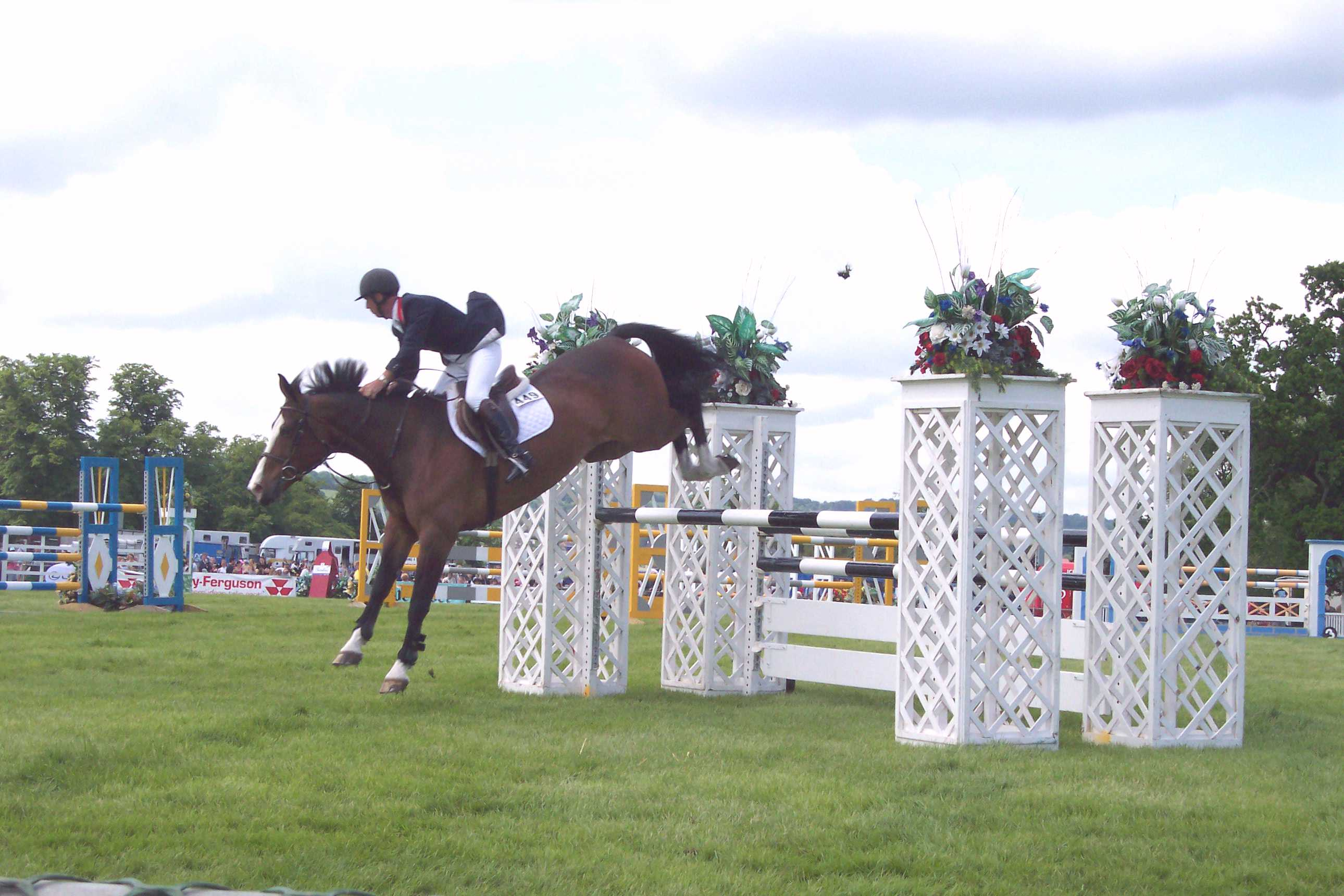
Show jumping.

The RHHT is located on 120 acres (0.49 km^{2}) of native wooded land in northwest Tallahassee. Elinor Klapp-Phipps Park hosts the Dressage and Stadium Jumping events, while adjoining Ayavalla Plantation, owned by Tallahassee ecologist and horse enthusiast Colin Phipps, hosts the cross-country event.

The cross-country course was designed by Captain Mark Phillips, Chef d'Equipe and Technical Advisor for the United States Equestrian Team and a former member of the Great Britain Olympic team. The cross-country course was built by Scotland's Hugh Lochore. It features a variety of formidable obstacles, including water, banks and ditches, which wind through Phipps' arboretum. There are four dressage rings, the stadium course, and stabling facilities.

== Divisions ==
CIC-W *** and CIC**; Advanced, Intermediate, and Preliminary divisions. Entries automatically are entered in the USEA Gold Cup Series.

== Events ==
=== Dressage ===
"Dressage" (pronounced like massage) is derived from a French word that means "training." It is a prescribed set of movements has its roots in the European renaissance when the European riders developed a sequential training system considered to be the basis of modern dressage. Judges look for a supple, balanced and lively ride that showcases the horse's natural athletic ability. Judges evaluate each movement on a zero to 10 scale.

=== Cross country ===
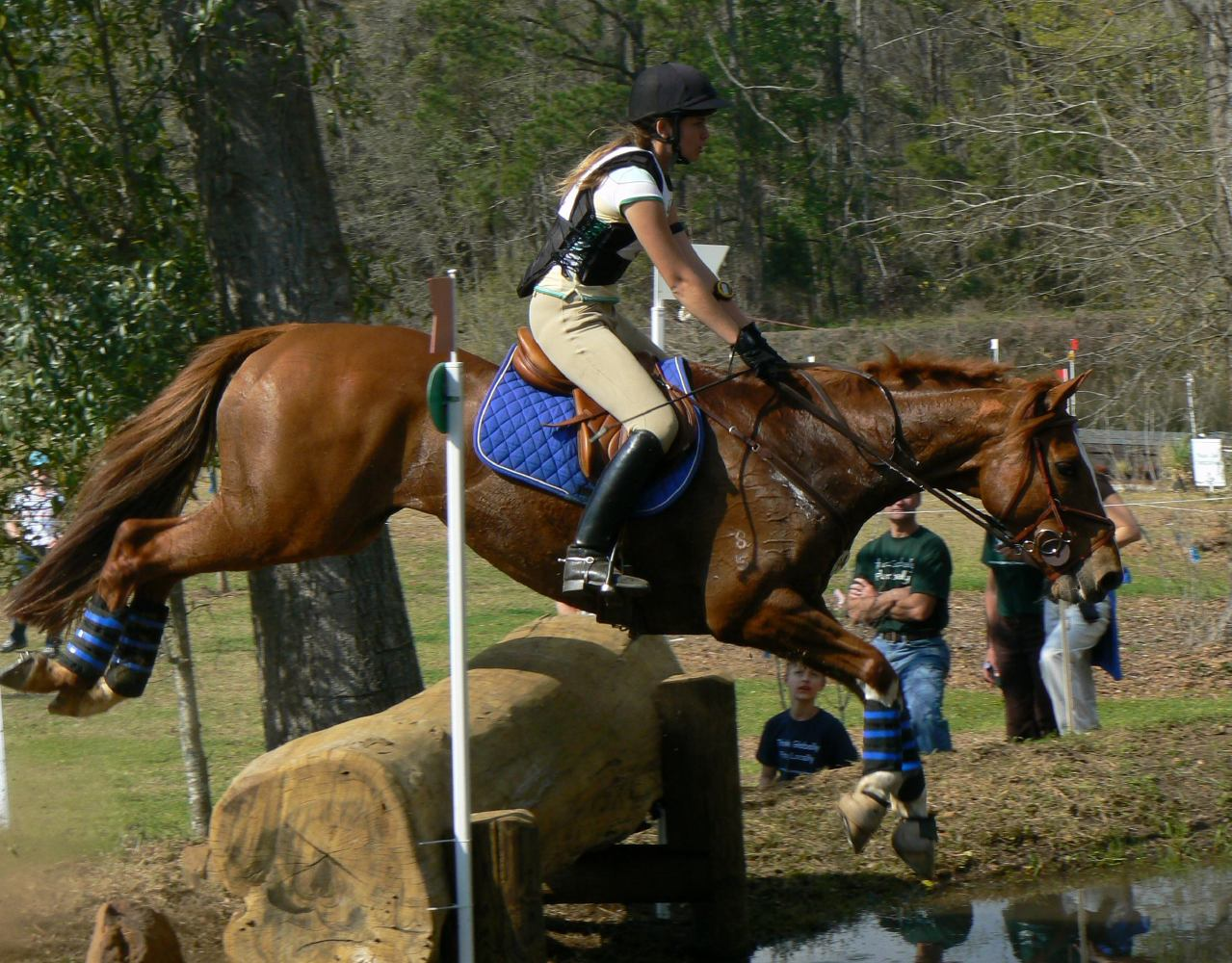
Cross-country at Red Hills Horse Trials, 2007.

This second challenge has horse and rider maneuvering through fence obstacles. Competitors must negotiate the course at the correct angle, height and speed to clear fences. The rider may inspect the course beforehand, but the horse leaves the starting box not knowing what lies ahead, demanding absolute trust between horse and rider.

=== Stadium jumping ===
The final phase has horse and rider jump a series of painted fences in an enclosed arena. If a horse falls, balks or knocks down any portion of an obstacle, a penalty point, or fault, is added to the score. Stadium jumping tests the obedience and suppleness of the horse and demonstrates that sufficient stamina and fitness still remain after the cross-country event.

== Visitors ==
The "Red Hills Avenue of Shops" provides visitors and patrons a variety of vendors including English tack and riding apparel, horse jumping equipment, a food court, specialty feeds, artwork, jewelry, real estate, USEA books, women's apparel, and sculpture.

== Casualties and incidents ==
=== 2008 ===
- Darren Chiacchia was seriously injured on the preliminary course when he and his mount Baron Verdi had a rotational fall.
- Direct Merger, ridden by Jonathan Holling, died while galloping after fence 8 on the CIC***W course. The cause was pulmonary hemorrhage
- Leprechauns Rowdy Boy, ridden by Missy Miller died after a rotational fall at the water on the advanced course. The cause was pulmonary hemorrhage.

=== 2015 ===
- Conahy's Courage, ridden by Kyle Carter was euthanized after suffering a rotational fall at fence 12a on cross-country.
