= Thomas E. David =

American politician

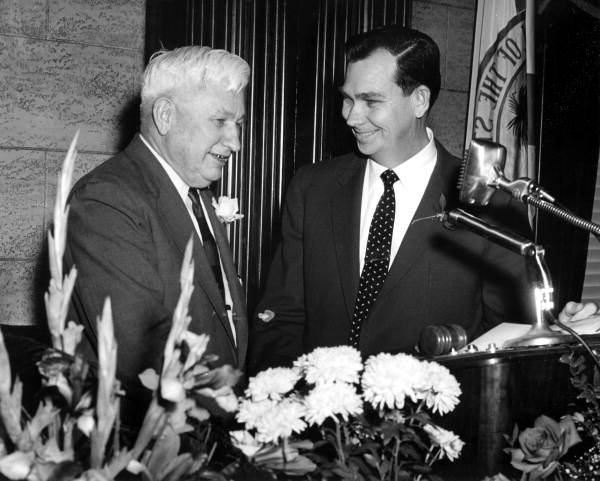
- David (right) with Amos Hays Davis, 1955

Member of the Florida House of Representatives from Broward County
- In office 1949–1957

Speaker of the Florida House of Representatives
- In office 1955–1957
- Preceded by: C. Farris Bryant
- Succeeded by: Doyle Conner

Members of the Florida Senate from the 30th district
- In office 1961–1962

Personal details
- Born: April 2, 1920 Comer, Georgia, U.S.
- Died: June 30, 1972 (aged 52)
- Party: Democratic

Thomas Edward David (April 2, 1920 – June 30, 1972), also known as Ted David, was an American politician. He served as a Democratic Party member of the Florida House of Representatives. He also served as a member for the 30th district of the Florida Senate.

== Life and career ==
David was born in Comer, Georgia. His family lived in Hollywood, Florida.

David served in the Florida House of Representatives from 1949 to 1957 and was speaker of the House for two years.

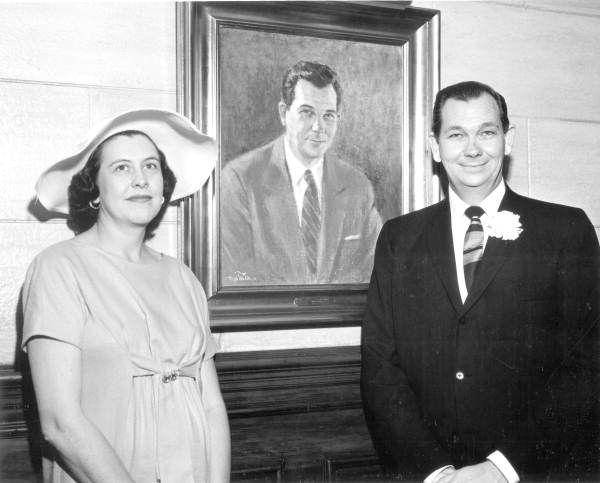
David (right) with his wife, 1959

He also ran for governor unsuccessfully in 1960.

David then served in the Florida Senate from 1961 to 1962, representing the 30th district.

David died in New Orleans on June 30, 1972 from a heart attack.

== See also ==
- List of speakers of the Florida House of Representatives
