= Charles Dean (politician) =

American politician (1939–2026)

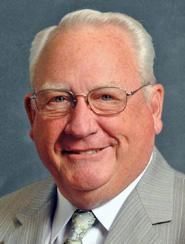

Member of the Florida Senate
- In office October 3, 2007 – November 8, 2016
- Preceded by: Nancy Argenziano
- Succeeded by: Rob Bradley
- Constituency: 3rd (2007–2012); 5th (2012–2016)

Member of the Florida House of Representatives from the 43rd district
- In office November 19, 2002 – June 26, 2007
- Preceded by: Nancy Argenziano
- Succeeded by: Ron Schultz

Personal details
- Born: May 31, 1939 Jacksonville, Florida, U.S.
- Died: February 23, 2026 (aged 86)
- Party: Republican (2002–2026); Democratic (before 2002)
- Spouse: Judy Baxter
- Education: Central Florida Community College (A.A.); Florida State University (B.S.); Rollins College (M.S.)
- Profession: Sheriff

Charles S. Dean Sr. (May 31, 1939 – February 23, 2026) was an American Republican politician who served as a member of the Florida Senate, representing the 5th District, which includes Baker, Citrus, Columbia, Dixie, Gilchrist, Lafayette, Levy, western Marion, Suwannee, and Union Counties in North Florida, from 2012 to 2016, previously representing the 3rd District from 2007 to 2012. Before winning election to the Senate, Dean served as a member of the Florida House of Representatives, representing the 43rd District from 2002 to 2007.

== History ==
Dean was born in Jacksonville, and attended Central Florida Community College, receiving his associate's degree in 1962. He then attended Florida State University, receiving a bachelor's degree in criminology and police administration in 1963, and then Rollins College, graduating with a master's degree in criminal justice in 1976. In 1980, Dean ran for Sheriff of Citrus County, and faced Burton Quinn and Edwin Graham in the Democratic primary, whom he defeated by a wide margin, winning 50% of the vote to Quinn's 40% and Graham's 10%, and he was elected unopposed in the general election. Running for re-election in 1984, Dean was opposed by Barbara Banks Mitcheltree, the Republican nominee, winning in a landslide with 76% of the vote. His campaign for re-election in 1988 was closer, but he still won comfortably, receiving 65% of the vote to the 35% received by Republican nominee Richard Eary. In 1992, Dean was narrowly elected to his fourth and final term over Howard Arnold, the Republican nominee, with 54% of the vote.

== 1996 State Senate campaign ==
When incumbent State Senator Karen Johnson declined to seek another term to instead unsuccessfully run for Citrus County Superintendent of Public Schools, Dean ran to succeed her in the 11th District, which included parts of Citrus, Lake, Marion, Seminole, and Sumter Counties. He won the Democratic primary, and faced Anna Cowin, a Lake County School Board Member and the Republican nominee. Dean campaigned on his law-and-order credentials and experience as sheriff, sharply criticizing Cowin's plan to eliminate parole and probation altogether, arguing, "You can't sit someone in a cell doing hard time forever. You have got to be able to motivate them to get back in society." During the campaign, the National Republican Senatorial Committee began airing advertisements on Cowin's behalf, despite the fact that the election was not a federal one, noting, "The state and local candidates of today are the U.S. Senate candidates of tomorrow." The Dean campaign filed a lawsuit against the NRSC for the advertisements, which argued that Dean reduced a murder charge for a friend of his family, ignored a warrant issued against the daughter of the retiring State Senator, and had the county jail removed from his control after a prisoner outbreak, arguing that the advertisements were "flat-out false." Then-Governor Lawton Chiles, who campaigned alongside Dean on several occasions, similarly condemned the advertisements as "a mockery out of anything we can do with campaign reform." Ultimately, despite the fact that some analysts argued that the close campaign between Dean and Cowin could determine control of the State Senate, Cowin defeated Dean by a wide margin, winning 57% of the vote to Dean's 43%. The bitterly fought campaign, however, left feelings of antipathy between the two candidates, with Dean later remarking, "Anna Cowin won our election. But I'm not sure how she can look at herself in the mirror after the way she won it."

== Florida House of Representatives ==
In 2002, when State Representative Nancy Argenziano opted to run for a seat in the Florida Senate rather than seek re-election to the State House, Dean ran to succeed her as a Republican in the 43rd District. He faced Joey White and Nancy Dunwoodie in the Republican primary, and was attacked by White over his previous registration as a Democrat and for being a "career politician." Dean responded, "He's trying to make me out as some Clinton-Gore fan. That ain't so. If I was, I would have stuck with the Democrats. My conservative beliefs led me to where I am today." He campaigned on providing additional assistance to seniors, improving the state's public education system, continuing to support law enforcement efforts, and protecting the state's water resources, and, ultimately, ended up defeating White and Dunwoodie handily, winning the primary with 58% of the vote to White's 21% and Dunwoodie's 20%. In the general election, he was opposed by Jimmy Carr, the Democratic nominee, and Neil Polimeni, the Libertarian nominee. He ended up winning his first term in the legislature in a landslide, receiving 64% of the vote to Carr's 33% and Polimeni's 3%. Dean was re-elected handily in 2004, winning 63% of the vote to Democratic nominee Mike Jarrett's 37%, and was unopposed for re-election in 2006.

== Florida Senate ==
When Argenziano, whom Dean had succeeded in the House, was appointed to the Florida Public Service Commission by then-Governor Charlie Crist, a special election was held to fill the vacancy in the 3rd District, which stretched from Tallahassee to the Jacksonville suburbs, Ocala, and Citrus County. Dean ran to succeed her, and faced fellow State Representative Dennis K. Baxley and Don Curtis in the Republican primary. Dean campaigned on accountability in the legislature and reforming the state's tax code, and organized an efficient turnout operation. Dean ended up narrowly defeating his opponents, receiving 45% of the vote to Baxley's 44% and Curtis's 11%, and advanced to the general election, where he faced Suzan Franks, the Democratic nominee. During the campaign, Franks attacked Dean for voting for a massive property tax cut, which she argued would bankrupt local government agencies. However, owing to the district's strong tendency to vote for Republicans, Dean ended up defeating her in a landslide, winning 67% of the vote. He faced Franks again in 2008, and though the contest was closer, he still defeated her by a wide margin with 58% of the vote.

When the state's legislative districts were reconfigured in 2012, Dean was moved into the 5th District, where he ran for re-election. He did not face opposition in the primary or general election, and won his third and final term in the legislature without any opposition.

== Death ==
Dean died on February 23, 2026, at the age of 86.
