= Michelle Rehwinkel Vasilinda =

American politician (born 1960)

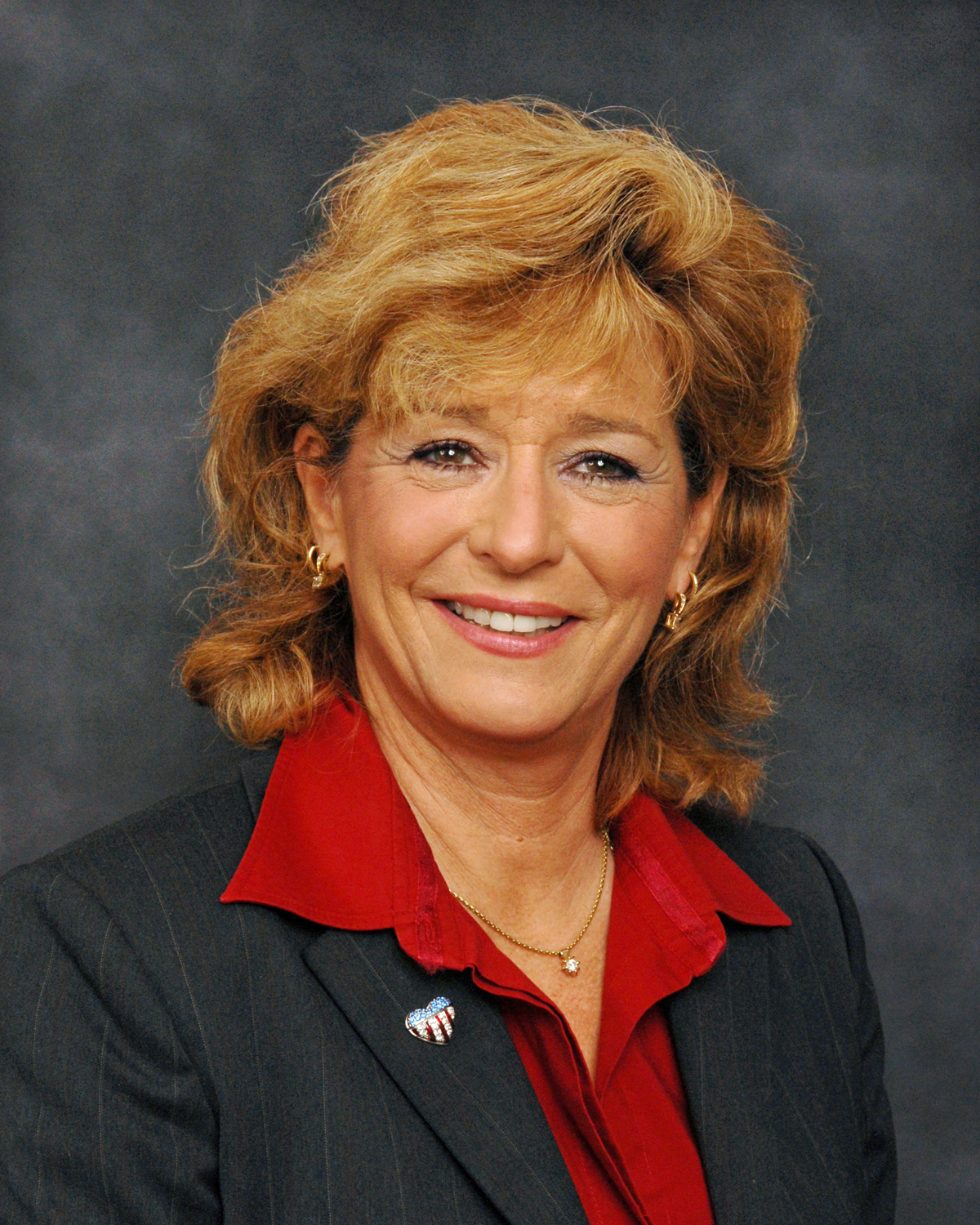

Member of the Florida House of Representatives from the 9th district
- In office November 4, 2008 – November 8, 2016
- Preceded by: Loranne Ausley
- Succeeded by: Loranne Ausley

Personal details
- Born: Michelle Marie Rehwinkel; July 9, 1960 (age 66) Rochester, New York, U.S.
- Party: Republican (since 2017)
- Other political affiliations: Democratic (until 2016); Independent (until 2017)
- Spouse: Mike Vasilinda
- Children: 2
- Education: New College of Florida; University of South Florida (BA); University of Florida (JD)

Michelle Rehwinkel Vasilinda (born July 9, 1960) is an American politician and lawyer from Florida. She is a former member of the Florida House of Representatives, in which she represented the 9th District, which includes most of Leon County, from 2008 to 2016. In addition to her legislative career, Rehwinkel Vasilinda is an attorney and has been a professor of Legal Studies and Applied Ethics at Tallahassee Community College since 1989.

== Early life, education, and personal life ==
Rehwinkel Vasilinda was born in Rochester, New York and moved to Florida in 1977 to attend New College, where she studied from 1977 to 1982, before graduating from the University of South Florida in 1982 with a degree in social and behavioral studies. Following this, she attended the University of Florida College of Law, graduating with her Juris Doctor in 1985, and has been a member of the Florida Bar since 1986. As a member of The Florida Bar, she was appointed to the Vision 2016 Commission. She is the mother of two adult daughters and three adult stepsons and is married to Mike Vasilinda.

== Other activities ==
From 1986 to 1989 she was an assistant general counsel at the Florida Department of Environmental Regulation. From 1998 to 2008 she was a consultant to Mike Vasilinda Productions.

== Political campaigns ==
In 2008, Rehwinkel Vasilinda was elected to represent the 9th District, which included parts of Gadsden County, Jefferson County, and Leon County. She won the Democratic primary unopposed, and faced Peter Boulware, the Republican nominee and a former football player for the Florida State Seminoles and the Baltimore Ravens. Despite the district's Democratic lean, Boulware was competitive with Rehwinkel Vasilinda, and managed to significantly outraise her. In the end, she emerged narrowly victorious, winning by 430 votes and with 49% of the vote.

She was challenged in the Democratic primary in 2010 by Rick Minor, the former Chairman of the Leon County Democratic Party. Minor attacked her for voting in favor of offshore oil drilling, a vote that she contended was part of "a much larger energy package," declaring that she "never promoted, supported or defended offshore drilling." She was also attacked for being "a liability," as in 2008, she "barely won in a district that Barack Obama took by 24 points." Despite these spirited attacks, however, Rehwinkel Vasilinda easily defeated Minor, winning 69% of the vote. In the general election, she faced Kirk Headley-Purdue, who did not present much of a challenge to her, and she comfortably won with 59% of the vote.

When districts were redrawn in 2012, Rehwinkel Vasilinda remained in the 9th District, which became solely located in Leon County. She faced Bradley L. Maxwell, the Republican nominee who had previously run against former State Representative Curtis Richardson in 2000, as her general election opponent. The Tallahassee Democrat endorsed her for re-election, citing her efforts to protect government jobs in the district, specifically praising her for fighting "to save the jobs of workers at the Jefferson Correctional Institution, which was slated for closure." In the end, she was re-elected overwhelmingly, winning 62% of the vote.

In 2014, when Rehwinkel Vasilinda ran for her fourth and final term in the legislature, she was opposed by Arnitta Grice-Walker in the Democratic primary. Due to the fact that no other candidates filed, the primary was opened to all voters. During the campaign, Grice-Walker declined to criticize Rehwinkel Vasilinda's service in the legislature, instead running on her plans to reform the state's public employee pension plan and to raise the minimum wage. Rehwinkel Vasilinda campaigned on her support for alternative energy and her opposition to the death penalty, noting, "We're not doing what we should be doing in regard to renewable energy. We are at a point where it shouldn't be alternative, it should be pro forma." In the end, Rehwinkel Vasilinda defeated Grice-Walker in a landslide, winning 82% of the vote.

In September 2016, with less than two months until the end of her final House term, Rehwinkel Vasilinda changed her party registration from Democratic to No Party Affiliation. The change made her the only Florida legislator not registered with either major party. In February 2017, she officially registered with the Republican Party. In 2019, she donated 17 times to Donald J Trump for President Inc.

== Florida House of Representatives ==
Rehwinkel Vasilinda served on the Judiciary, Education, Energy and Utilities, and Highway and Waterway Safety Committees, and was the Ranking Democratic Member on the Higher Education and Workforce committee in the 2015 session. In past years she served on the following committees: Finance and Tax, Rules and Calendar, Choice and Innovation Education K-20, Agriculture and Natural Resources Policy, Agriculture and Natural Resources Appropriations, Economic Development Policy, Health and Family Services Policy Council, Health Care Regulation Policy, and Select Committee on Government Reorganization.

While serving in the Florida House of Representatives, Rehwinkel Vasilinda convened the Big Bend Anti-Bullying Task Force in 2010 and a statewide Anti-Bullying Roundtable in 2013. She also hosted and convened the Clean Energy Congress in 2010 and 2013. Rehwinkel Vasilinda was an initiator and co-chair with Senator Nancy Detert of the Florida Film, Entertainment and Television Caucus, responsible for the passage of $220,000,000 in television and film credits to bring and keep jobs in the state of Florida. In 2009, she served as a member of the Agriculture and Energy Committee at the National Conference of State Legislatures in Philadelphia, at the request of the Speaker of the House.

Throughout her career in the Florida House, Rehwinkel Vasilinda's primary focus in her legislative endeavors was in regard to the areas of renewable energy, film and entertainment, tourism, tax reform, ethics, education, economic development and environmental and agricultural issues.
