= Florida's 3rd Senate district =

American legislative district

Florida's 3rd State Senate district
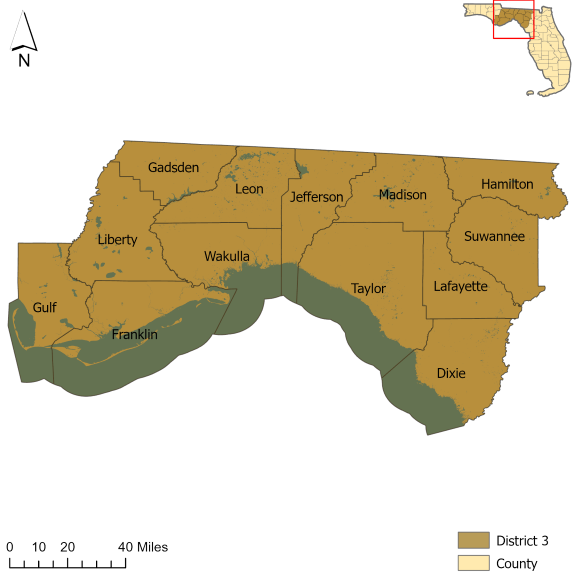
- Interactive map of district boundary since January 3, 2023
Senator
Corey Simon; R–Tallahassee
- Demographics: 59% White; 29.3% Black; 7.4% Hispanic; 2.4% Asian; 0.4% Native American; 0% Hawaiian/Pacific Islander
- Population (2020): 486,331

Florida's 3rd Senate district elects one member of the Florida Senate. The district currently consists of Dixie, Franklin, Gadsden, Gulf, Hamilton, Jefferson, Lafayette, Leon, Liberty, Madison, Suwannee, Taylor, Wakulla counties in the U.S. state of Florida. The current senator is Republican Corey Simon.

== List of senators ==
NOTE: The following information was gathered from the Florida Senate website. Only records of senators from 1998–present are kept.

Portrait	Name	Party	Years of service	Home city/state	Notes
	Pat Thomas	Democratic	1980–2000	Quincy, Florida	Died in Office 6/21/2000; Consisted of Calhoun, Franklin, Gadsden, Gulf, Jackson, Liberty, Wakulla, parts of Bay, Jefferson, Leon and Madison county
	Al Lawson	Democratic	2000–2002	Midway, Florida	Consisted of Calhoun, Franklin, Gadsden, Gulf, Jackson, Liberty, Wakulla, parts of Bay, Jefferson, Leon and Madison county
	Nancy Argenziano	Republican	2002–2008	Brooklyn, New York	Consisted of Baker, Dixie, Hamilton, Lafayette, Suwannee, Taylor counties and parts of Citrus, Columbia, Jefferson, Leon, Levy, Madison, Marion counties
	Charles Dean	Republican	2008–2012	Jacksonville, Florida	Consisted of Baker, Dixie, Hamilton, Lafayette, Suwannee, Taylor counties and parts of Citrus, Columbia, Jefferson, Leon, Levy, Madison, Marion counties
	Bill Montford	Democratic	2012–2020	Marianna, Florida	Consisted of Calhoun, Franklin, Gadsden, Gulf, Hamilton, Jefferson, Leon, Liberty, Madison, Taylor, Wakulla counties
	Loranne Ausley	Democratic	2020–2022	Tallahassee, Florida	Consisted of Calhoun, Franklin, Gadsden, Gulf, Hamilton, Jefferson, Leon, Liberty, Madison, Taylor, Wakulla counties
	Corey Simon	Republican	2022–Present	Tallahassee, Florida	Consists of Dixie, Franklin, Gadsden, Gulf, Hamilton, Jefferson, Lafayette, Leon, Liberty, Madison, Suwannee, Taylor, Wakulla counties

== Elections ==
NOTE: The following results were gathered from the Florida Department of State. Uncontested election results are not provided.

=== 1980 ===
General Election (1980)
Party	Candidate	Votes	%
Democratic	Dempsey J. Barron	86,241	57.1%
Republican	Elliot Messer	64,776	42.9%
Total votes		151,017	100%

=== 1988 ===
Democratic Primary (1988)
Party	Candidate	Votes	%
Democratic	Dempsey J. Barron	31,511	48.3%
Democratic	Vince Bruner	33,692	51.7%
Total votes		65,203	100%

General Election (1988)
Party	Candidate	Votes	%
Republican	Bill Jennings	47,952	46.0%
Democratic	Vince Bruner	56,347	54.0%
Total votes		104,299	100%

=== 1992 ===
Democratic Primary (1992)
Party	Candidate	Votes	%
Democratic	Jack McLean	27,700	35.6%
Democratic	Pat Thomas	50,119	64.4%
Total votes		77,819	100%

=== 2000 ===
Democratic Primary (2000)
Party	Candidate	Votes	%
Democratic	Eddie Boone	16,229	22.6%
Democratic	Janegale Boyd	22,487	31.3%
Democratic	Dean J. Fenn	4,750	6.6%
Democratic	Al Lawson	28,282	39.4%
Total votes		71,748	100%

Democratic Primary Runoff (2000)
Party	Candidate	Votes	%
Democratic	Janegale Boyd	26,627	41.3%
Democratic	Al Lawson	37,919	58.7%
Total votes		64,546	100%

General Election (2000)
Party	Candidate	Votes	%
Republican	Brecht Heuchan	51,142	34.8%
Democratic	Al Lawson	95,619	65.1%
Democratic	Janegale Boyd	22,487	31.3%
Write-In	David B. Murrell	10	0.0%
Write-In	Glenn R. Pickett	3	0.0%
Write-In	Bryan Price	9	0.0%
Total votes		146,783	100%

=== 2002 ===
General Election (2002)
Party	Candidate	Votes	%
Republican	Nancy Argenziano	82,488	54.5%
Democratic	Richard Mitchell	68,934	45.5%
Total votes		151,422	100%

General Election (2004)
Party	Candidate	Votes	%
Republican	Nancy Argenziano	135,494	66.1%
Democratic	Barry Brooks	69,601	33.9%
Total votes		205,095	100%

=== 2008 ===
General Election (2008)
Party	Candidate	Votes	%
Republican	Charles Dean	134,029	58.0%
Democratic	Suzan L R Franks	96,875	42.0%
Total votes		230,904	100%

=== 2012 ===
General Election (2012)
Party	Candidate	Votes	%
Republican	John Shaw	61,956	27.2%
Democratic	Bill Montford	165,634	72.8%
Total votes		227,590	100%

=== 2016 ===
General Election (2016)
Party	Candidate	Votes	%
Republican	Nancy Miller	77,192	32.6%
Democratic	Bill Montford	159,288	67.4%
Total votes		236,480	100%

=== 2020 ===
Republican Primary (2020)
Party	Candidate	Votes	%
Republican	Benjamin Alexander Thaddeus John Horbowy	8,555	21.3%
Republican	Marva Harris Preston	31,683	78.7%
Total votes		40,238	100%

General Election (2020)
Party	Candidate	Votes	%
Republican	Marva Harris Preston	120,176	46.6%
Democratic	Loranne Ausley	137,609	53.4%
Total votes		257,785	100%

=== 2022 ===
General Election (2022)
Party	Candidate	Votes	%
Republican	Corey Simon	113,477	53.0%
Democratic	Loranne Ausley	100,696	47.0%
Total votes		214,173	100%

=== 2024 ===
Democratic Primary (2024)
Party	Candidate	Votes	%
Democratic	Kimblin NeSmith	13,690	24.5%
Democratic	Daryl Parks	42,097	75.5%
Total votes		55,787	100%

General Election (2024)
Party	Candidate	Votes	%
Republican	Corey Simon	154,515	55.7%
Democratic	Daryl Parks	123,025	44.3%
Total votes		227,540	100%
