= Clyde Galloway =

American politician

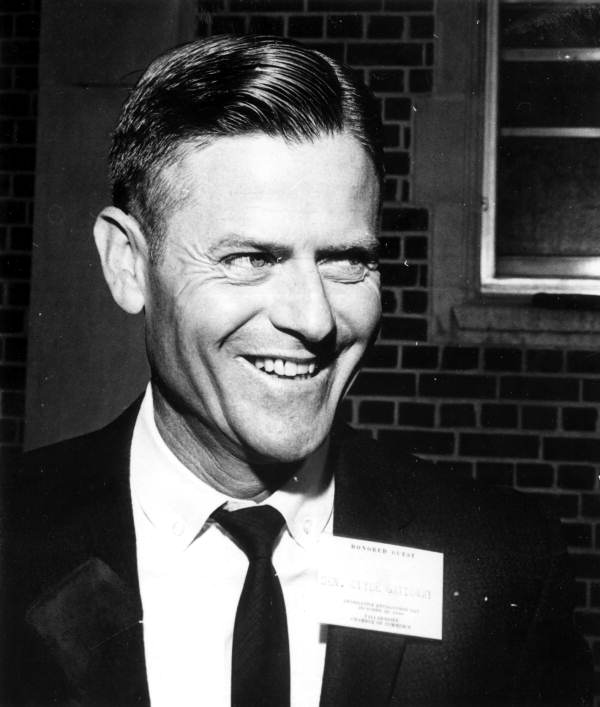
- Galloway in 1961

Member of the Florida Senate from the 3rd district
- In office 1961–1963

Personal details
- Born: August 1, 1925 Holmes County, Florida, U.S.
- Died: December 30, 2009 (aged 84)
- Party: Democratic
- Spouse: Dorothy Davis Galloway

Clyde Galloway (August 1, 1925 – December 30, 2009) was an American politician. He served as a Democratic member for the 3rd district of the Florida Senate.

== Life and career ==
Galloway was born in Holmes County, Florida.

Galloway served in the Florida Senate from 1961 to 1963, representing the 3rd district.

Galloway died on December 30, 2009, at the age of 84.
