= Nancy Argenziano =

American politician (born 1955)

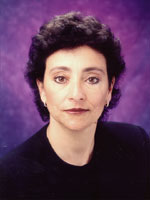

Member of the Florida Senate from the 3rd district
- In office November 5, 2002 – May 1, 2007
- Preceded by: Al Lawson
- Succeeded by: Charles Dean

Member of the Florida House of Representatives from the 43rd district
- In office November 5, 1996 – November 5, 2002
- Preceded by: Helen Spivey
- Succeeded by: Charles Dean

Personal details
- Born: January 1, 1955 (age 71) Brooklyn, New York, U.S.
- Party: Reform
- Other political affiliations: Republican (until 2011)
- Website: Campaign website

Nancy Argenziano (born January 1, 1955) is a former state legislator in Florida and served as chairman of the Florida Public Service Commission. She was the Reform Party of Florida's candidate for lieutenant governor in 2018.

== Personal life ==
Argenziano was born in Brooklyn, New York, and moved to Florida in 1971. She has one son.

== Political career ==
Argenziano was first elected to the Florida House of Representatives in 1996 and served there until her election to the Florida Senate in 2002. In 2007, Florida governor Charlie Crist appointed her to the state's Public Service Commission.

A member of the Republican Party throughout her legislative career, Argenziano switched to become an independent in 2011.

In 2001, Argenziano delivered 25 lbs of gift-wrapped cow manure to Jodi Chase, a lobbyist for Associated Industries of Florida. AIF represents nursing home providers in Florida and was supporting SB1202, a nursing home reform bill which sought to limit damages in cases where a death did not occur or injuries were not deemed serious. Argenziano was one of the only state senators opposing the bill. Chase apparently entered Argenziano's office uninvited to watch a floor debate around the bill, angering the legislator. The manure was later delivered to Chase at a lobbyist area in the Florida State Capitol Building, drawing a rebuke from the AIF and then-House Speaker Tom Feeney, but gaining Argenziano many signatures from colleagues in a petition of support.

Florida House of Representatives
Preceded by Helen Spivey	Member of the Florida House of Representatives from the 43rd district 1996–2002	Succeeded by Charles Dean
Florida Senate
Preceded by Al Lawson	Member of the Florida Senate from the 3rd district 2002–2007	Succeeded by Charles Dean
