= List of Florida State University people =

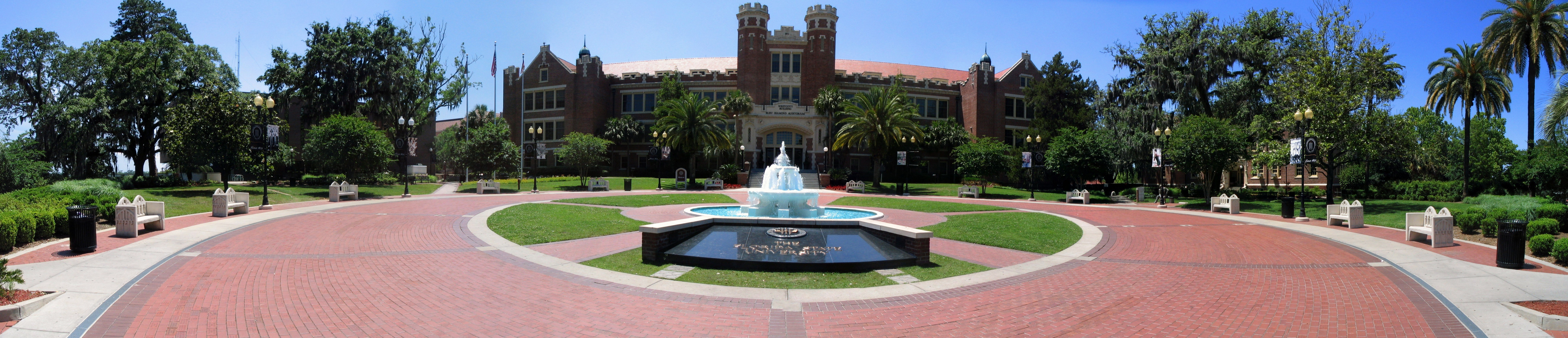
Westcott Building

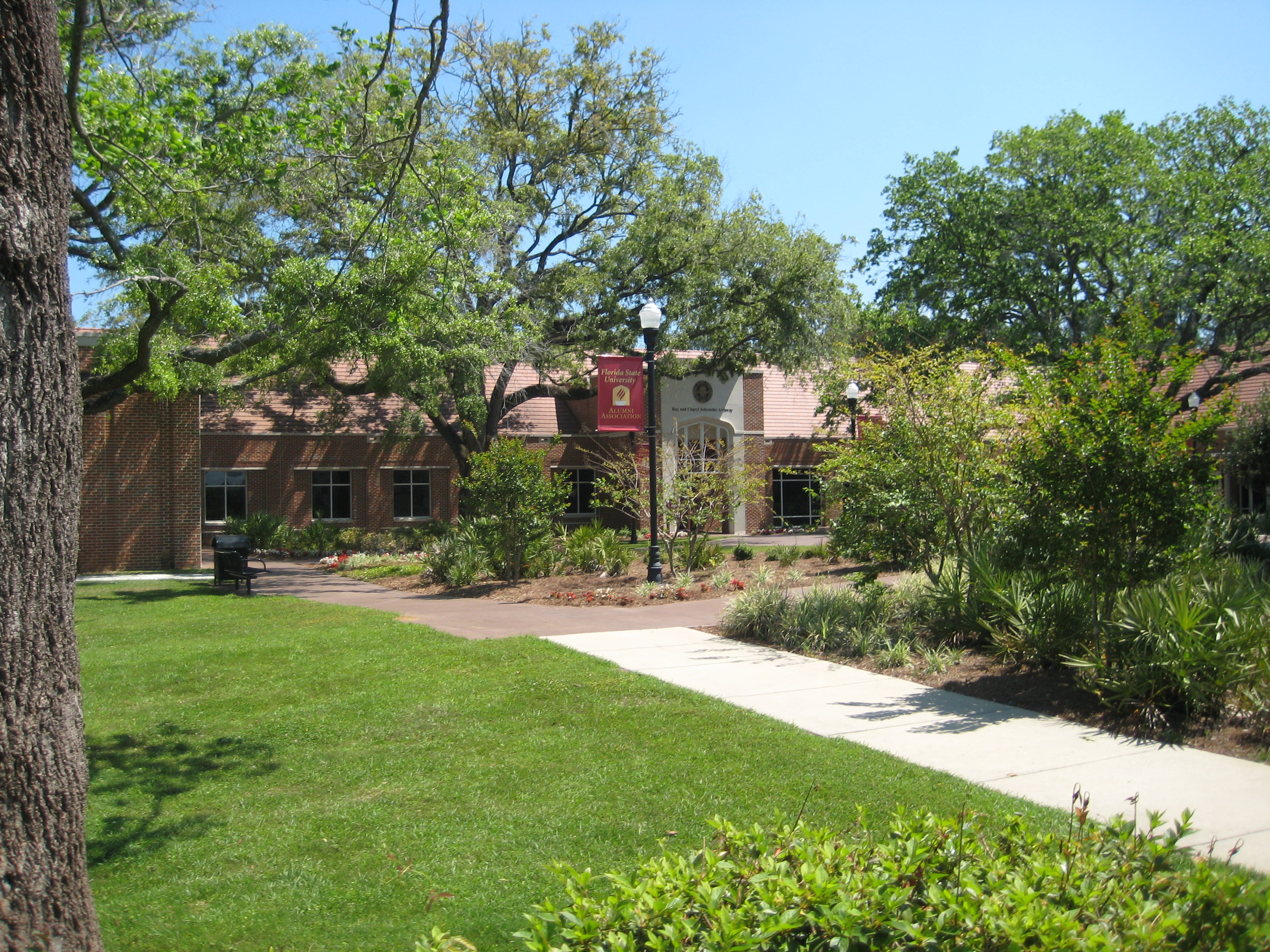
FSU Alumni Center

This list of Florida State University people includes notable graduates, non-graduate former students, and current students of Florida State University (FSU). Florida State alumni are generally known as Seminoles. Florida State University is a public space-grant and sea-grant research university in Tallahassee, Florida. Since its founding in 1851, Florida State has graduated 173 classes of students, and today has approximately 400,000 alumni.

== Academia and research ==
=== Educators ===
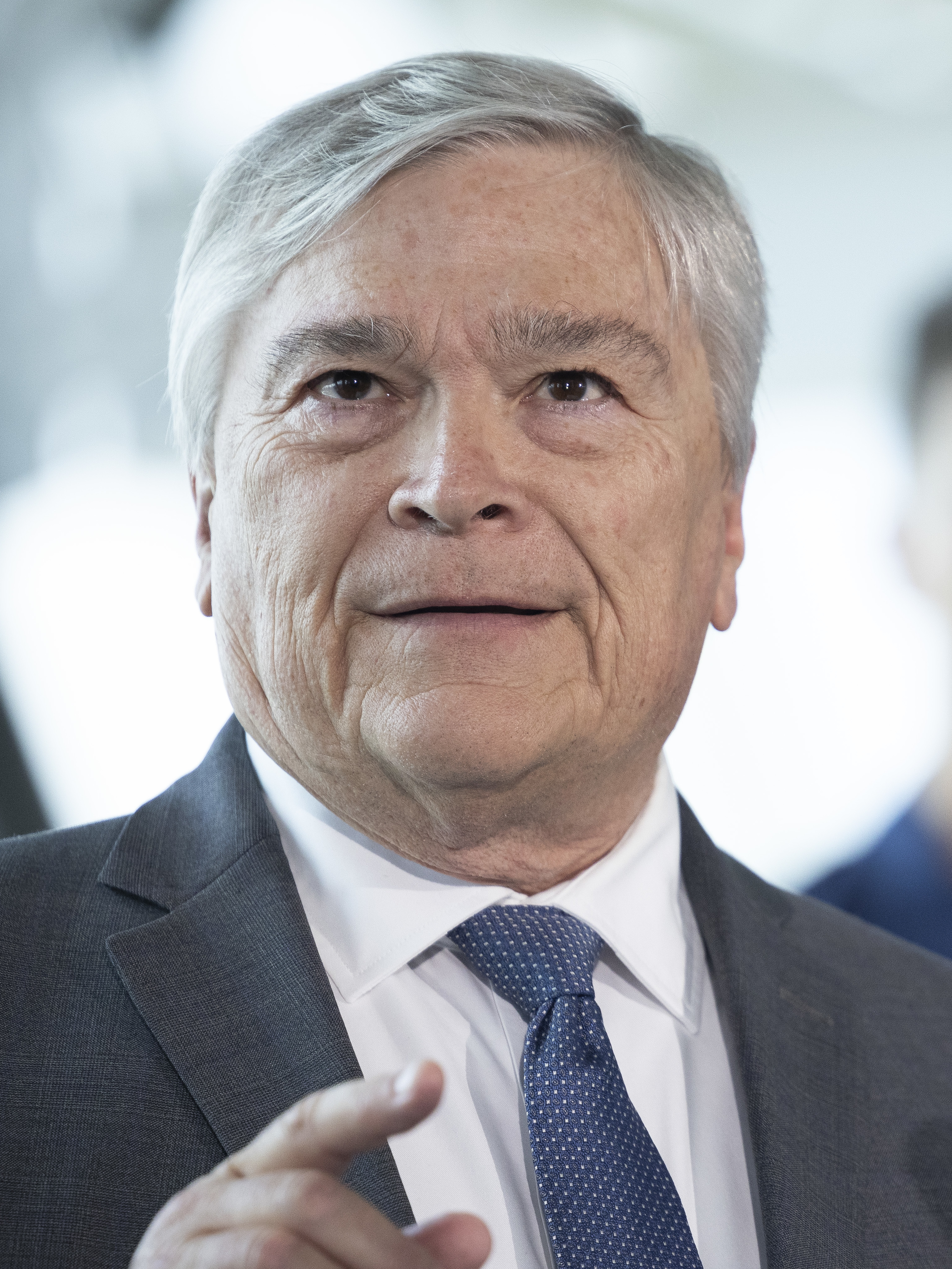
Eric Barron

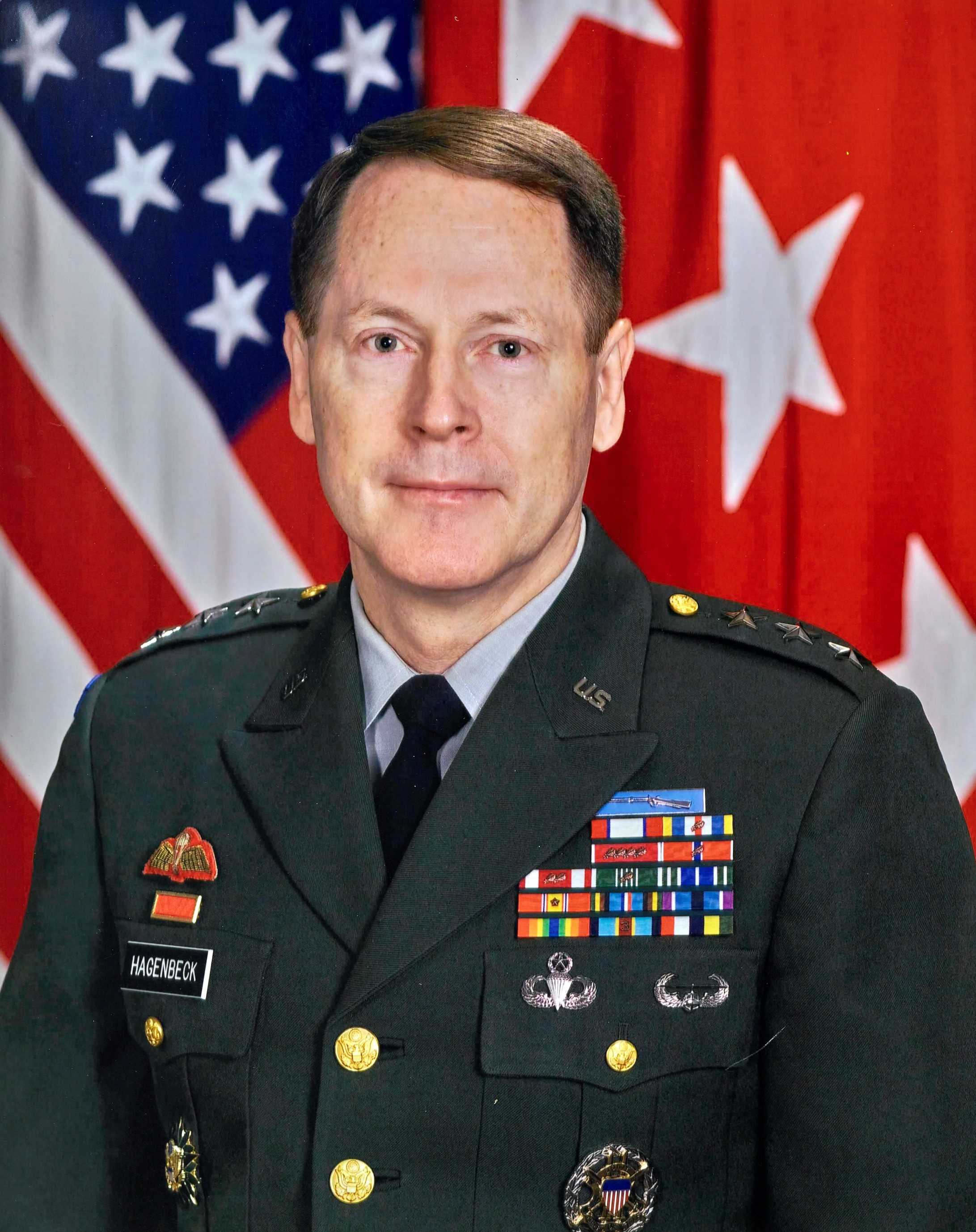
Frank Hagenback

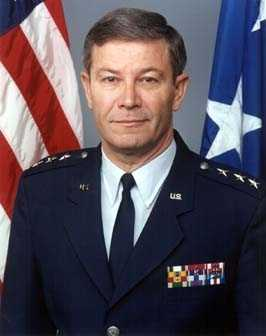
Paul Stein

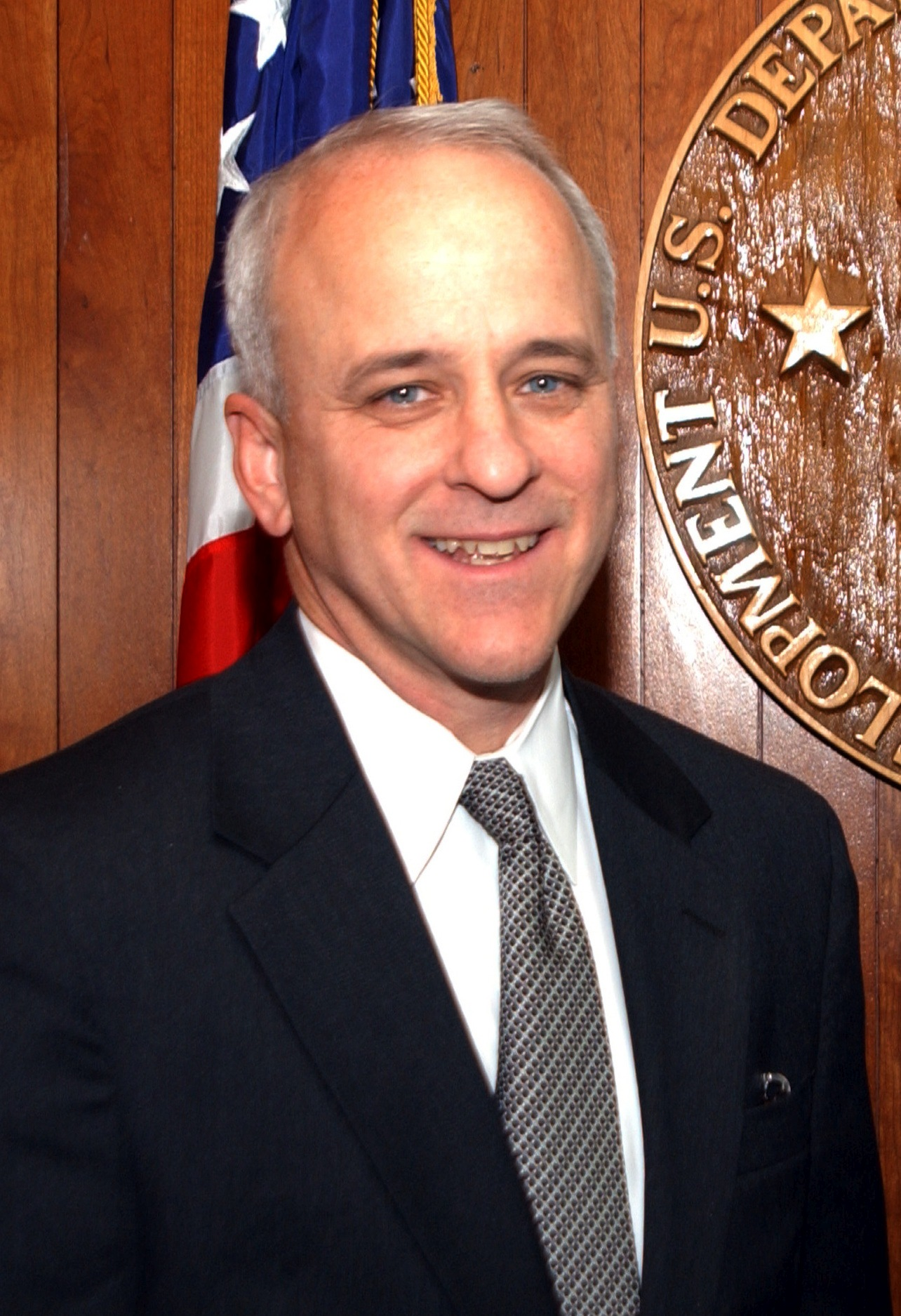
Jim Towey

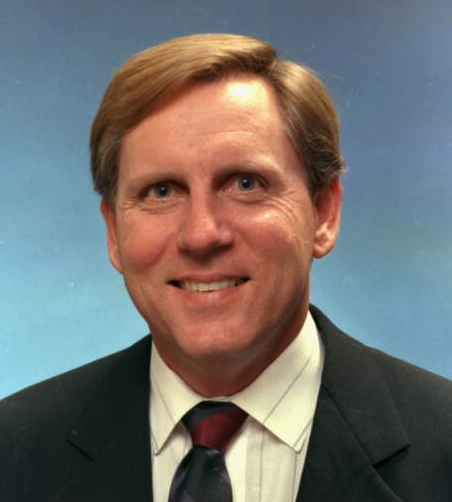
T. K. Wetherell

| Alumni | Notability | Reference |
|---|---|---|
| James Ammons | President of Florida A&M University | |
| J. David Armstrong | President of Broward College | |
| Eric J. Barron | President of Florida State University and Pennsylvania State University | |
| Judith A. Bense | President of the University of West Florida | |
| John Grosskopf | President of North Florida Community College | |
| Franklin L. Hagenbeck | Superintendent of the United States Military Academy | |
| Mark R. Hamilton | President of the University of Alaska System | |
| Carl Hite | President of Cleveland State Community College | |
| Marvalene Hughes | President of Dillard University | |
| Ronald R. Ingle | President of Coastal Carolina University | |
| John P. Johnson | President of Embry–Riddle Aeronautical University | |
| A. James Kerley | President of Gulf Coast State College | |
| Anne B. Kerr | President of Florida Southern College | |
| Carl M. Kuttler, Jr. | President of St. Petersburg College | |
| Charlie LaPradd | President of St. Johns River Community College | |
| William D. Law | President of St. Petersburg College | |
| Terrence Leas | President of Big Bend Community College | |
| Aubrey K. Lucas | President of the University of Southern Mississippi | |
| E. Ann McGee | President of Seminole State College of Florida | |
| Robert McLendon | President of St. Johns River Community College | |
| Charles R. Middleton | President of Roosevelt University | |
| Albert A. Murphree | President of Florida State College for Women and University of Florida | |
| William L. Proctor | Chancellor of Flagler College and athletic director for Florida State University | |
| James C. Renick | Chancellor of University of Michigan–Dearborn and vice president of the American Council on Education | |
| Clyda Stokes Rent | President of Mississippi University for Women | |
| Martha Dunagin Saunders | President of the University of West Florida | |
| Betty L. Siegel | President of Kennesaw State University and the University System of Georgia | |
| Paul E. Stein | Superintendent of the United States Air Force Academy | |
| Glenn Terrell | President of Washington State University | |
| John E. Thrasher | President of Florida State University | |
| Jim Towey | President of Ave Maria University, president of Saint Vincent College, and director of the White House Office of Faith-Based and Community Initiatives | |
| John Kenneth Waddell | President of Allen University and president of Denmark Community College | |
| E. Jean Walker | President of Virginia Highlands Community College | |
| T. K. Wetherell | President of Florida State University | |
| Mark S. Wrighton | Chancellor of Washington University in St. Louis | |

==== Academic administrators ====
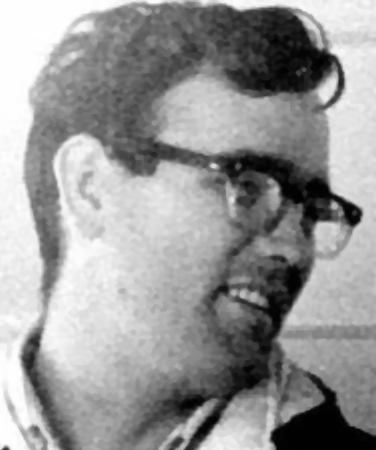
Lawrence Abele

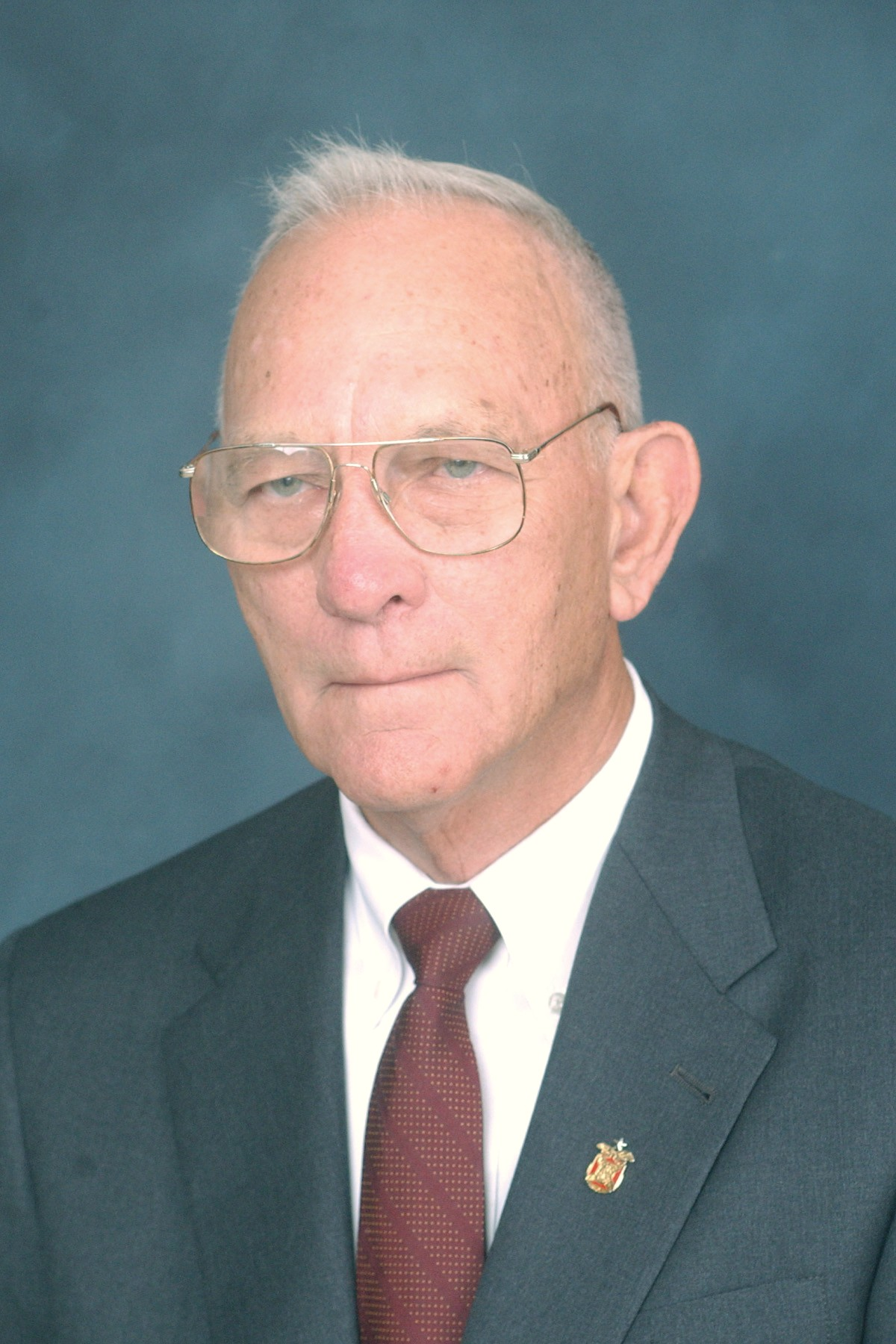
William Proctor

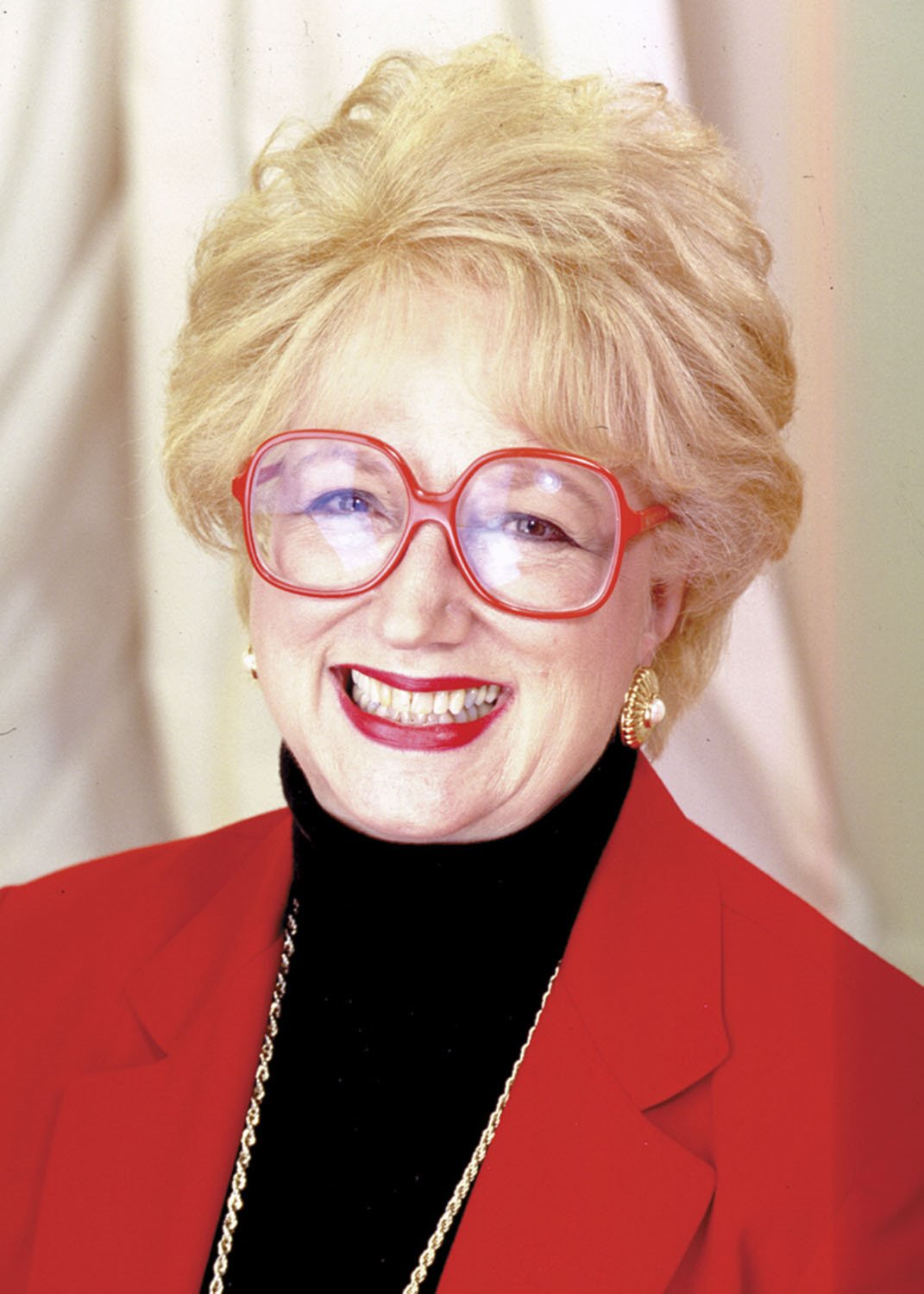
Betty Siegel

| Alumni | Notability | Reference |
|---|---|---|
| Lawrence G. Abele | Provost of Florida State University | |
| Debra D. Austin | Chancellor of the State University System of Florida and provost of FAMU | |
| Gordon C. Bond | Dean of the College of Liberal Arts at Auburn University | |
| Todd Britsch | Vice president at Brigham Young University and emeritus professor of humanities | |
| Jered Carr | Director of the L.P. Cookingham Institute of Urban Affairs | |
| Thomas A. Desjardin | Commissioner of education for the State of Maine | |
| Steve Edwards | Deputy provost of Florida State University | |
| Marc H. Ellis | Director of Jewish Studies at Baylor University | |
| Leonard Erickson | Deputy director of the Indiana University Cancer Center | |
| Wayne Flynt | Writer, historian, and University Professor Emeritus in the Department of History at Auburn University | |
| Dwight Gustafson | Dean of fine arts at Bob Jones University | |
| Tameka Bradley Hobbs | Associate provost of Florida Memorial University and founding director of the FMU Social Justice Institute think tank and research center | |
| Patrick C. Kennell | Director of the Center for Intensive English Studies at Florida State University | |
| Hilal Khashan | Administrator at American University of Beirut | |
| Aquila Berlas Kiani | President of the Pakistan Federation of University Women | |
| Stephen MacNamara | Vice president of Florida State University | |
| Robert Millet | Emeritus dean of religious education at Brigham Young University | |
| William L. Proctor | Athletic director for Florida State University | |
| James C. Renick | Vice president of the American Council on Education | |
| Xavier Serra | Founder and director of the Music Technology Group at Pompeu Fabra University | |
| Betty Siegel | President of the University System of Georgia | |

=== Professors and researchers ===
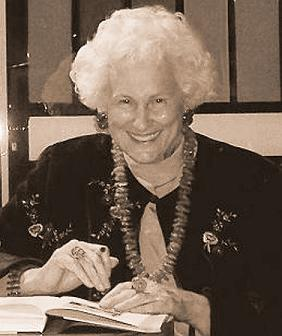
Virginia S. Carr

| Alumni | Notability | Reference |
|---|---|---|
| Thomas E. Baker | Constitutional law scholar and professor of law; a founding member of the Florida International University of the College of Law; nationally recognized constitutionalis; author of numerous books and editions, as well as commentary on constitutional law and the federal courts. | |
| Herman E. Brockman | Geneticist, professor at Illinois State University | |
| Elizabeth Chamblee Burch | Lawyer, elected member of the American Law Institute; Fuller E. Callaway Chair of Law at University of Georgia, and Charles Hughes Kirbo Chair of Law at UGA 2017–2018 | |
| John R. Carpenter | Geochemist, professor at University of South Carolina | |
| Virginia Spencer Carr | Biographer, professor at Columbia State University and Georgia State University | |
| Ricardo Dominguez | Artist, activist, and associate professor of visual arts at UC San Diego; subject of controversy over a number of acts of electronic civil disobedience on his own and with the Electronic Disturbance Theater, which he founded | |
| Skip Horack | Writer and professor; former Stegner Fellow and Jones Lecturer at Stanford University; assistant professor at Florida State University | |
| Fiona Kelleghan | Science fiction scholar and critic; associate professor at University of Miami | |
| Jesse Lee Kercheval | Academic, poet, memoirist, translator and fiction writer; professor at University of Wisconsin–Madison; author of numerous books, notably Building Fiction, The Museum of Happiness, and The Dogeater | |
| Margaret Keyes | Academic and heritage preserver; former professor of Home Economics at University of Iowa; nationally recognized leader in the field of heritage conservation, known for her work to preserve the Iowa Old Capitol Building | |
| Masood Ashraf Raja | Associate professor of postcolonial literature and theory at University of North Texas; editor and founder of Pakistaniaat: A Journal of Pakistan Studies, an open-access journal | |
| Leonard Skinner | High school gym teacher, basketball coach, and businessman; namesake of the Southern rock band Lynyrd Skynyrd | |
| David Ward-Steinman | Composer and music professor; Distinguished Professor of Music Emeritus at San Diego State University; former professor at Indiana University | |

=== Science, space, technology, and math ===
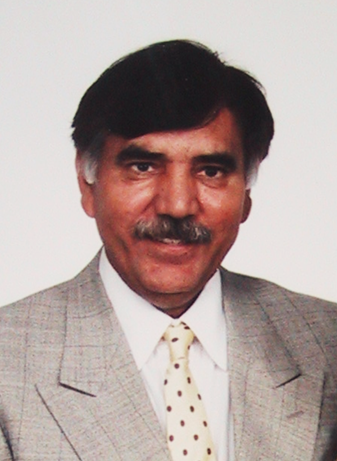
Mujaddid Ahmed Ijaz

| Alumni | Notability | Reference |
|---|---|---|
| Kathleen Amm | Researcher and director of the National High Magnetic Field Laboratory | |
| Brent A. Barlow | Former professor at Brigham Young University and author | |
| Eric J. Barron | Former director of the National Center for Atmospheric Research in Boulder, Colorado; former dean of the College of Geosciences at University of Texas-Austin | |
| Justin Brown | Professional aquanaut with the University of North Carolina Wilmington | |
| Antonio Busalacchi Jr. | Current chairman of World Climate Research Programme and a committee for the National Academy of Sciences, professor at University of Maryland | |
| Suzy Covey | Pioneer in XML encoding, and librarian emerita at the George A. Smathers Libraries | |
| Joseph W. Cullen | Former deputy director of the National Cancer Institute in Washington, D.C. | |
| Sylvia Earle | Former chief scientist for the U.S. National Oceanic and Atmospheric Administration | |
| Steve Edwards | Physicist | |
| Mostafa El-Sayed | Current Julius Brown Chair and Regents Professor of Chemistry and Biochemistry at Georgia Institute of Technology; Member of the National Academy of Sciences | |
| Marc H. Ellis | Theologian and philosopher | |
| Leonard Erickson | Deputy director of the Indiana University Cancer Center, and professor at IUPUI | |
| Jaime Escalante | Former Bolivian educator | |
| A. Wilson Greene | Civil War historian and author; former executive director of Pamplin Historical Park and the National Museum of the Civil War Soldier | |
| Carolyn S. Griner | Former director of the NASA Marshall Space Flight Center | |
| Steven Hebert | Nephrologist | |
| Robert A. Holton | Scientist who created Taxol, current professor at Florida State University | |
| Yun-Hwa Peggy Hsieh | Food scientist and fellow of the Institute of Food Technologists | |
| Mujaddid Ahmed Ijaz | Experimental physicist, early pioneer in developing Pakistan's nuclear deterrence program | |
| Dan Jones | Professor of English studies at University of Central Florida | |
| Jesse Lee Kercheval | Academic and writer; faculty member at University of Wisconsin–Madison | |
| Margaret Keyes | Scholar in heritage conservation | |
| Hilal Khashan | Professor of Political Science at American University of Beirut | |
| Jim Kuypers | Communications expert, professor at Virginia Tech | |
| William Leap | Anthropologist and professor at American University | |
| Deborah Mash | Professor of neurology, and director of the Brain Endowment Bank at University of Miami | |
| Warren P. Mason | Electrical engineer and physicist, founder of the field of distributed-element circuits | |
| Charles T. Meide | Underwater and maritime archaeologist | |
| Jason Moore | Translational bioinformatics scientist and human geneticist | |
| Anthony Nicholls | English physicist | |
| Harold O'Neil | Experimental psychologist; professor at University of Southern California | |
| Orrin H. Pilkey | Geologist, and professor emeritus at Duke University | |
| Alan R. Price | Former associate director for investigative oversight for the National Institute of Health | |
| Thomas S. Ray | Ecologist who created and developed the Tierra project, a computer simulation of artificial life | |
| Dušan Repovš | Slovenian mathematician, ambassador of the Republic of Slovenia for Science | |
| Landon T. Ross | Environmental biologist | |
| Anne Rudloe | Marine biologist, writer, environmentalist, co-founder of Gulf Specimen Marine Laboratory Environmental Law Institute National Wetlands Award winner | |
| James A. Shymansky | Science educator | |
| Dewey Smith | Professional aquanaut and underwater diver | |
| Nyayapathi Swamy | Mathematical physicist | |
| Maria Zemankova | Computer scientist, created the theory of Fuzzy Relational Database System, recipient of the SIGMOD Contributions Award | |

==== Astronauts ====
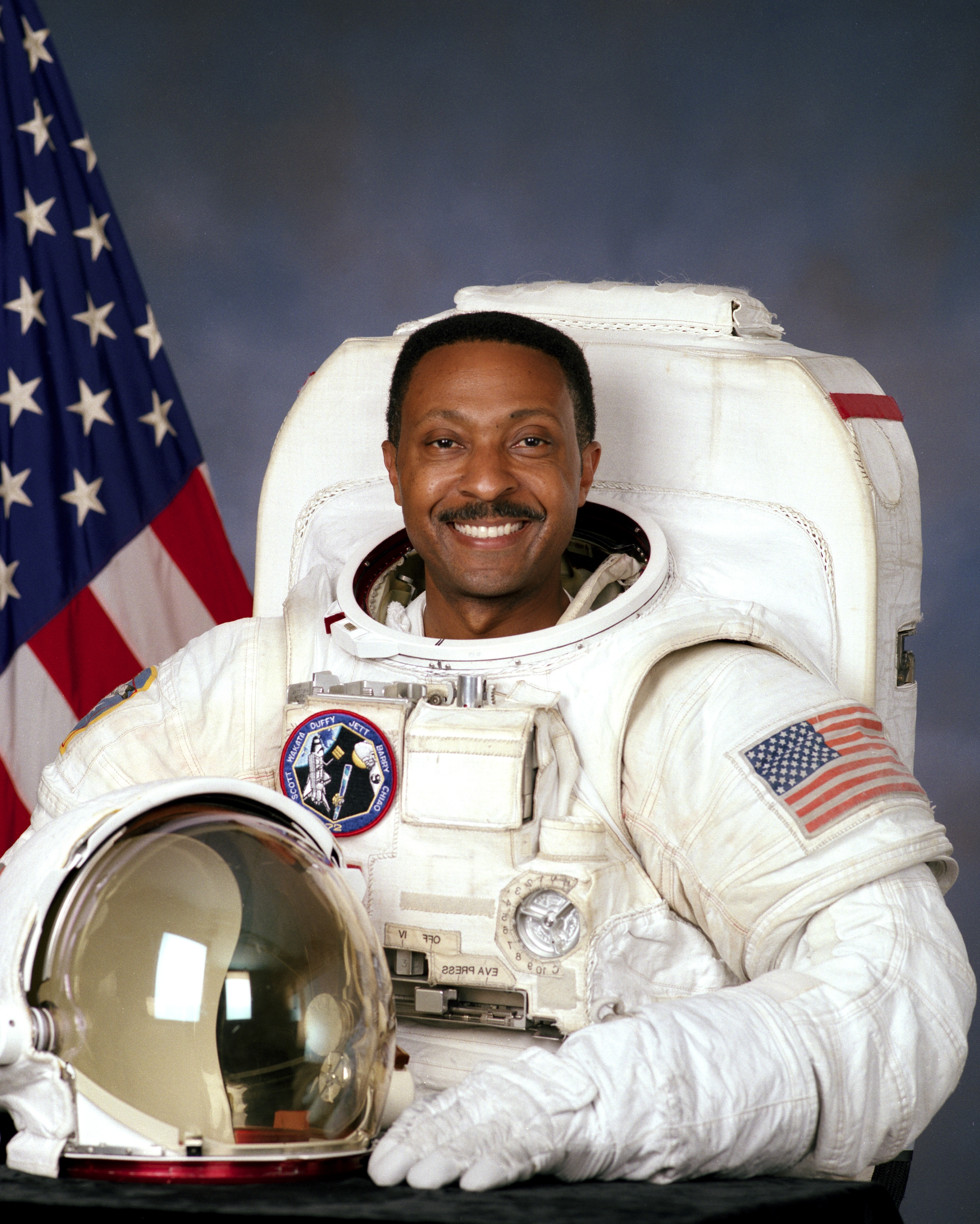
Winston E. Scott

| Alumni | Notability | Reference |
|---|---|---|
| Winston Scott | Former NASA astronaut | |
| Norman Thagard | Former NASA astronaut, current tenured professor of engineering at Florida State University | |

==== Meteorology ====
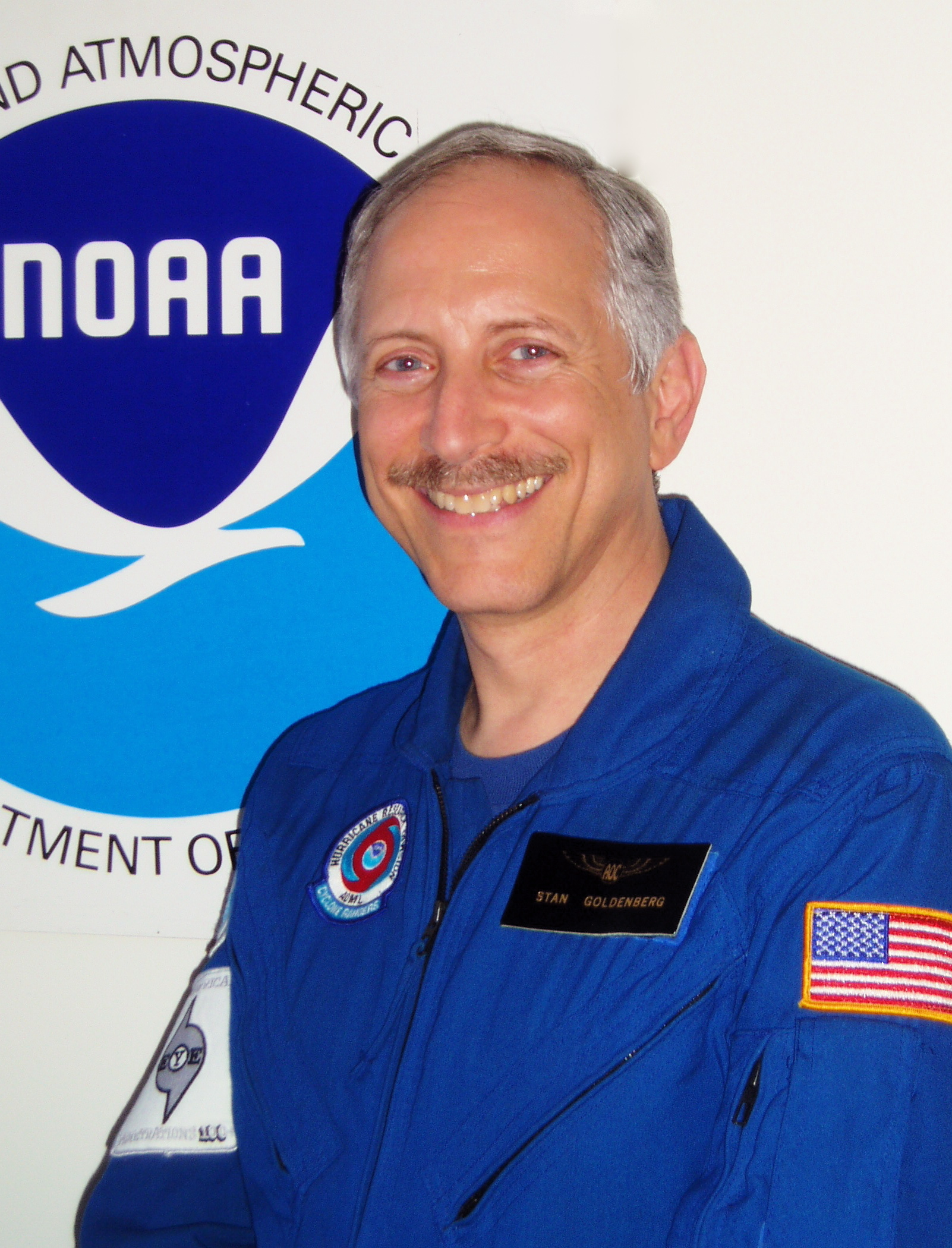
Stan Goldenberg

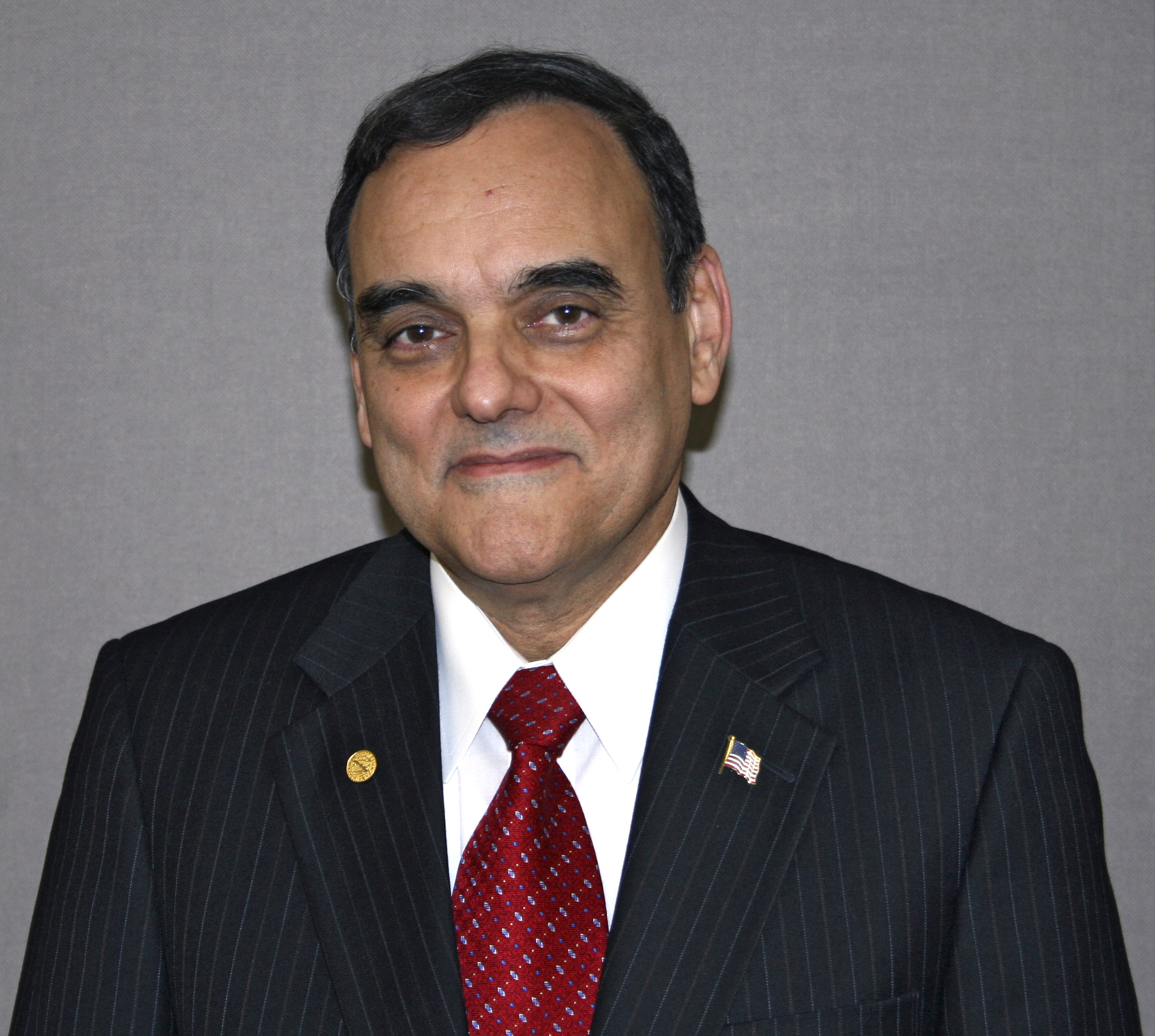
Bill Proenza

| Alumni | Notability | Reference |
|---|---|---|
| Stephanie Abrams | Meteorologist, The Weather Channel | |
| Neil Frank | Former director of the National Hurricane Center | |
| Stanley Goldenberg | Current meteorologist with the National Oceanic and Atmospheric Administration | |
| Thomas Grazulis | Meteorologist, worked for the Nuclear Regulatory Commission | |
| Janice Huff | Meteorologist, currently works for WNBC and the Today Show | |
| Richard Knabb | Former director of the National Hurricane Center; currently at The Weather Channel | |
| Jennifer Lopez | Meteorologist, currently works for the Weather Channel | |
| Max Mayfield | Former director of the National Hurricane Center | |
| Ada Monzón | First woman meteorologist in Puerto Rico | |
| Bryan Norcross | Meteorologist, currently a hurricane specialist for The Weather Channel | |
| Bill Proenza | Former director of the National Hurricane Center and former director of the National Weather Service's Southern Region | |
| Dallas Raines | Meteorologist, currently works for KABC-TV | |
| George Winterling | Former meteorologist with WJXT | |

=== Rhodes Scholars ===
| Alumni | Notability | Reference |
|---|---|---|
| Caroline Alexander | 1976 Rhodes Scholar | |
| Garrett Johnson | 2006 Rhodes Scholar | |
| Myron Rolle | 2009 Rhodes Scholar | |

== Architecture, engineering and building industry ==
| Alumni | Notability | Reference |
|---|---|---|
| Lex Hester | Consolidation architect, former chief administrative officer in Orlando, Broward County and Jacksonville | |
| Margaret Keyes | Academic and heritage preserver; former professor of Home Economics at University of Iowa; nationally recognized leader in the field of heritage conservation, known for her work to preserve the Iowa Old Capitol Building | |

== Arts and humanities ==
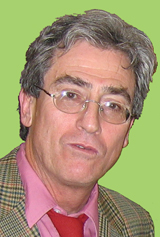
Bud Grace

| Alumni | Notability | Reference |
|---|---|---|
| Alyson Fox | Artist and illustrator | |
| Bud Grace | Cartoonist, strips include Ernie, Babs and Aldo | |
| Masumi Hayaski | Photographer and Fulbright fellow | |
| James F. Hutchinson | Painter, member of the Florida Artists Hall of Fame | |
| Salvador Miranda | Church historian and librarian | |
| Ted Studebaker | Christian missionary to Vietnam | |
| Lynne Taetzsch | Abstract painter and writer | |

== Business and finance ==
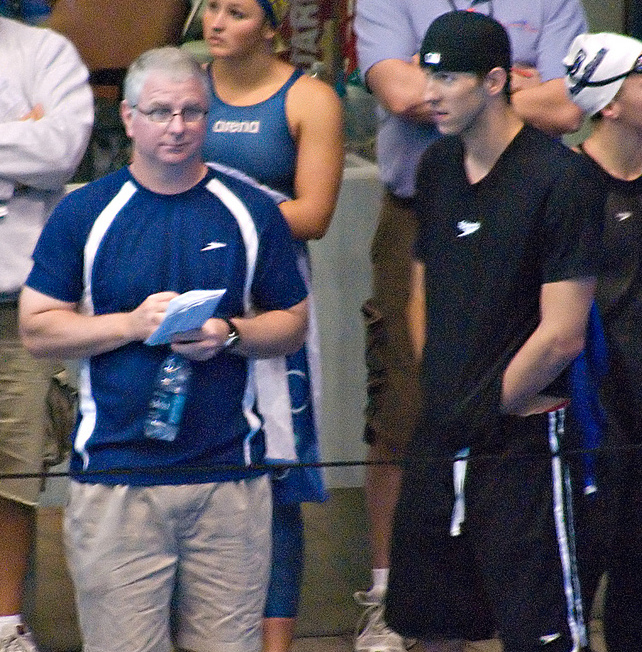
Bob Bowman the mentor to Michael Phelps

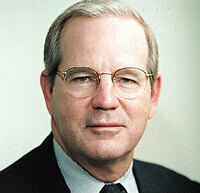
Manuel Johnson

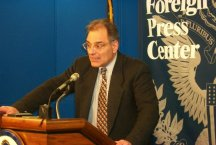
Peter Romero

Harry Sargeant

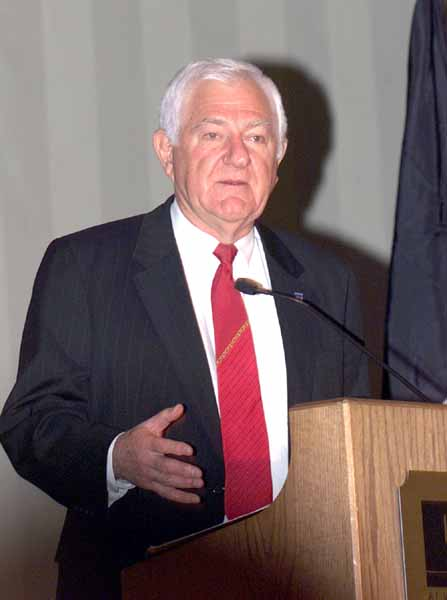
Orson Swindle

| Alumni | Notability | Reference |
|---|---|---|
| Sandon Berg | Film producer, actor, and screenwriter; co-founder of the United Gay Network | |
| Sara Blakely | President and founder of Spanx; judge on ABC's former reality television series American Inventor | |
| Bob Bowman | Current CEO of the North Baltimore Aquatic Club; mentor to Michael Phelps | |
| Ed Burr | Founder, president and chief executive officer of GreenPointe Holdings, LLC, a diversified holding company | |
| Jose Ceballos | Current director for the National Air Traffic Controllers Association | |
| Todd Combs | Hedge fund manager who has been tapped as a potential successor of Warren Buffett as the chief investment officer of Berkshire Hathaway | |
| Todd Crannell | Current president of Q2 Sports and Entertainment | |
| Meg Crofton | Current president of the Walt Disney World Resort | |
| John Culver | Current executive vice president of Starbucks | |
| James Dahl | Former senior vice president of Drexel Burnham Lambert | |
| Jeff Galloway | Current CEO of Galloway Productions | |
| Michael Genevie | Current executive director of the Abbeville Opera House | |
| Bill Grant | Former executive vice president of Worldwide Chemical; former U.S. Representative | |
| Chuck Hardwick | Senior vice president, corporate affairs, Pfizer Inc. | |
| Gordon S. Holder | Currently a vice president at Booz Allen Hamilton, and retired vice admiral in the United States Navy | |
| Glenda Hope | Head of the San Francisco Network Ministries, and minister with the Presbyterian Church | |
| Gary Huff | Former CFO for the Los Angeles Raiders, and also worked with the IBM Corporation | |
| Patricia Ireland | Former president of the National Organization for Women, and writer | |
| Kenneth A. Jessell | Current president of Florida International University; former senior vice president for finance and administration and chief financial officer of Florida International University | |
| Manuel H. Johnson | Current co-chairman of Johnson Smick International; former vice chairman of the board of governors of the Federal Reserve Bank | |
| Richard Legendre | Current vice president of CF Montreal | |
| Daryl Logullo | Marketing expert | |
| Marjorie Matthews | Former bishop for the United Methodist Church | |
| Martin Mayhew | American football player and executive | |
| Marc Middleton | Current CEO and founder of Growing Bolder | |
| Virginia Montes | Former secretary of the National Organization for Women, and civil rights activist | |
| Jane Mouton | Management theorist | |
| Gregory Parkes | Current bishop for the Catholic Church | |
| Tom Petway | Current minority partner of the Jacksonville Jaguars and chairman of the board for Zurich Insurance Services | |
| Bobby Pittman | Current vice president of African Development Bank | |
| Richard W. Rahn | Current chairman of the Institute for Global Economic Growth | |
| Peter F. Romero | Current CEO of Experior Advisory, and former United States ambassador | |
| Jeff Rosenthal | Current president and CEO of Hibbett Sporting Goods, Inc. | |
| Robert Sanborn | Current president and CEO of Children at Risk | |
| Harry Sargeant III | Owner of International Oil Trading Company; billionaire | |
| Brian Sussman | Current managing partner of 34 Pictures Entertainment | |
| Orson Swindle | Former executive director of United We Stand America, and former assistant secretary of commerce | |
| Carlos O. Torano | Current president of Toraño Cigars and Central America Tobacco | |
| Irita Van Doren | Former editor of the New York Herald Tribune | |
| Mike Vasilinda | Former executive with Florida's News Channel | |
| Woody Woodward | Former general manager for the New York Yankees | |
| Ed Young | Founder and senior pastor of Fellowship Church | |

== Entertainment ==
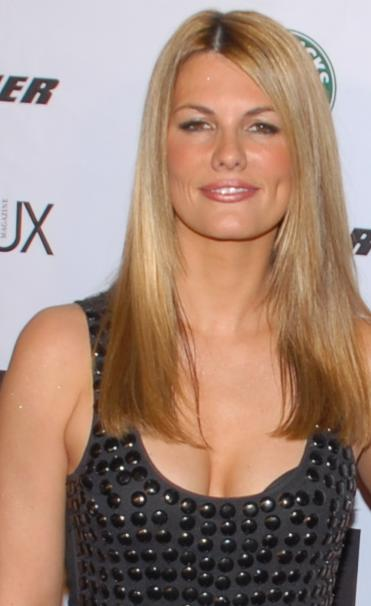
Courtney Hansen

| Alumni | Notability | Reference |
|---|---|---|
| Valorie Burton | Life coach, author, motivational speaker and entrepreneur; author of Listen to Your Life, What's Really Holding You Back?, Rich Minds, Rich Rewards; founder of the Coaching and Positive Psychology Institute | |
| Matt Chapman | Writer, voice actor, director, producer, and composer; co-creator of the animated series Homestar Runner | |
| Colleen Clinkenbeard | Director, writer, and producer for the English-language dub of Fullmetal Alchemist | |
| William A. Dawson | American football player and assistant coach for Marshall University; nicknamed "Red" for his red hair; portrayed by Matthew Fox in the film We Are Marshall | |
| Neil Druckmann | Writer, creative director, designer, and programmer; co-president of the video game developer Naughty Dog; known for his work on the game franchise The Last of Us | |
| Courtney Hansen | Syndicated columnist, TV personality, and model | |
| J'Tia Hart | Competitor on Survivor: Cagayan | |
| Allan Havey | HBO stand-up comic and host | |
| Ron Hazelton | Home improvement television personality | |
| Barry Horowitz | Former wrestler with the World Wrestling Federation and World Championship Wrestling | |
| Kevin Kelly | Professional wrestling manager, pundit, sportscaster and ring announcer | |
| Jonathan King | Producer and vice president of Focus Features, Dreamgirls, I, Robot, and Finding Forrester | |
| Bert Kreischer | Stand-up comedian and television host; real-life inspiration for the movie Van Wilder | |
| Michael James Nelson | Comedian, writer, producer, The Bachelor, MTV Movie Awards, Betty White's Off Their Rockers | |
| Heather Parcells | Dancer, singer, and actress | |
| Tom Pearson | Multidisciplinary artist, poet, choreographer, director | |
| Catherine Joy Perry | Model, actress, dancer, singer, and professional wrestler currently signed to WWE under the ring name Lana | |
| Gabrielle Reece | Sports presenter, former fashion model, and professional volleyball player | |
| Jenn Sterger | Model, television personality, and former online columnist for Sports Illustrated; an original member of the FSU Cowgirls | |

=== Film ===
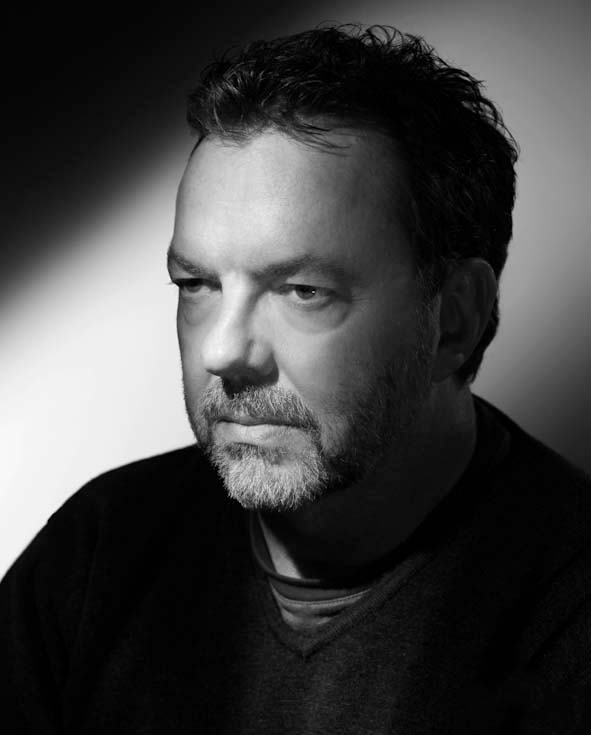
Alan Ball

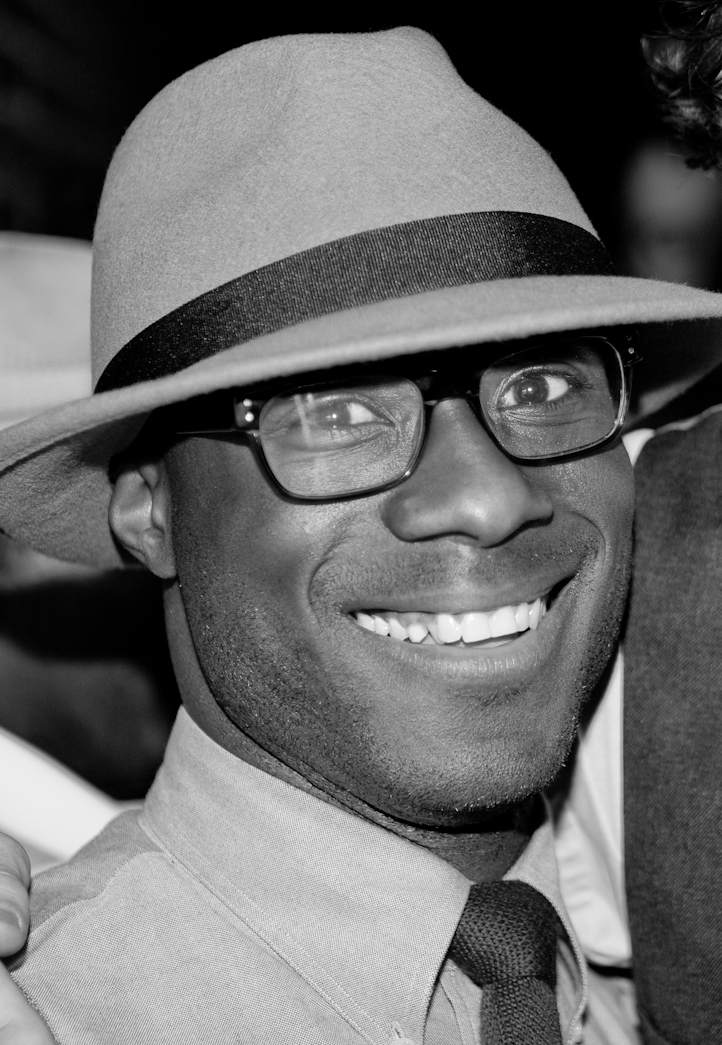
Barry Jenkins, 2009

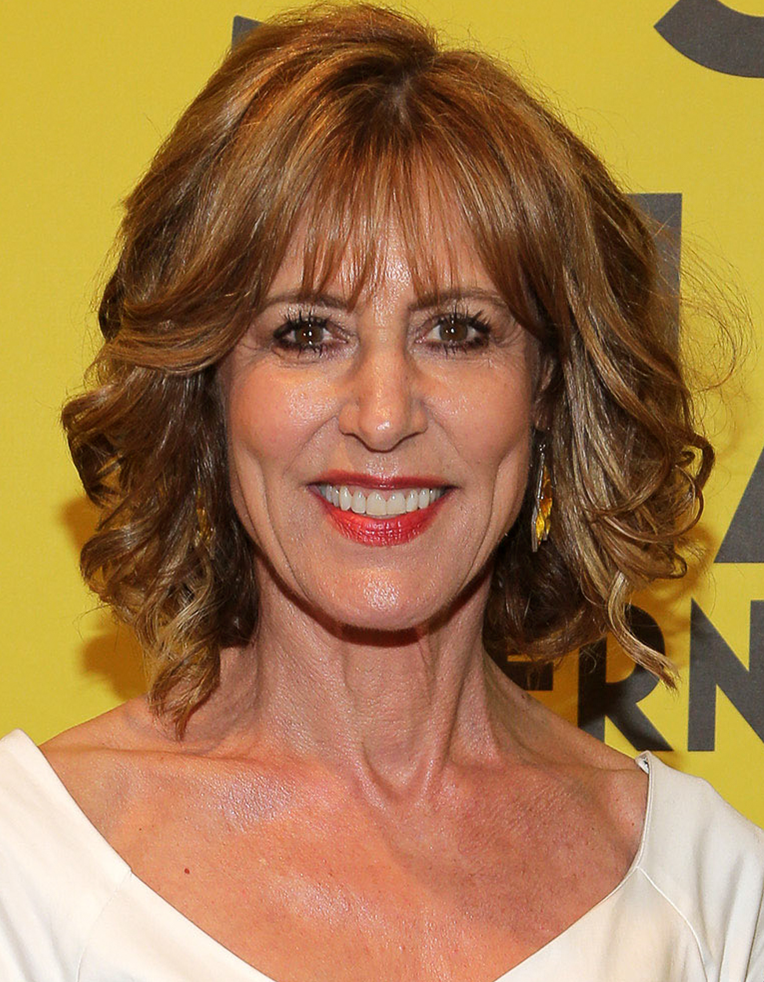
Christine Lahti

| Alumni | Notability | Reference |
|---|---|---|
| Josephine Abady | Director and producer | |
| Alan Ball | Academy Award–winning screenwriter and creator of Six Feet Under, True Blood, American Beauty | |
| Wes Ball | Director, The Maze Runner | |
| Ricou Browning | Film director, actor, producer and underwater cinematographer | |
| Kat Candler | Independent filmmaker | |
| Steven Conrad | Screenwriter, The Pursuit of Happyness | |
| Ron J. Friedman | Screenwriter, films Brother Bear, Chicken Little, and Open Season | |
| Barry Jenkins | Academy Award–winning director, producer, and screenwriter, known for directing Medicine for Melancholy and Moonlight | |
| Christine Lahti | Academy Award–winning director, and actress, Chicago Hope, Jack & Bobby | |
| James Laxton | Cinematographer, Moonlight | |
| Brad Linaweaver | Screenwriter and film producer, actor, science fiction writer | |
| Jamie Linden | Screenwriter, Money Monster, We Are Marshall | |
| Greg Marcks | Film director and screenwriter, 11:14 and Lector | |
| Joi McMillon | Film editor, Moonlight | |
| Lauren Miller | Actress and screenwriter | |
| David Robert Mitchell | Film director, It Follows | |
| Aaron Moorhead | Film director, The Endless, V/H/S: Viral (segment "Bonestorm") | |
| Nancy Oliver | Screenwriter | |
| Adele Romanski | Film producer, Moonlight | |
| Nat Sanders | Film editor | |
| Steven L. Sears | Television producer and screenwriter; author of novels and graphic novels | |
| Robin Swicord | Screenwriter and film director | |

=== Actors ===
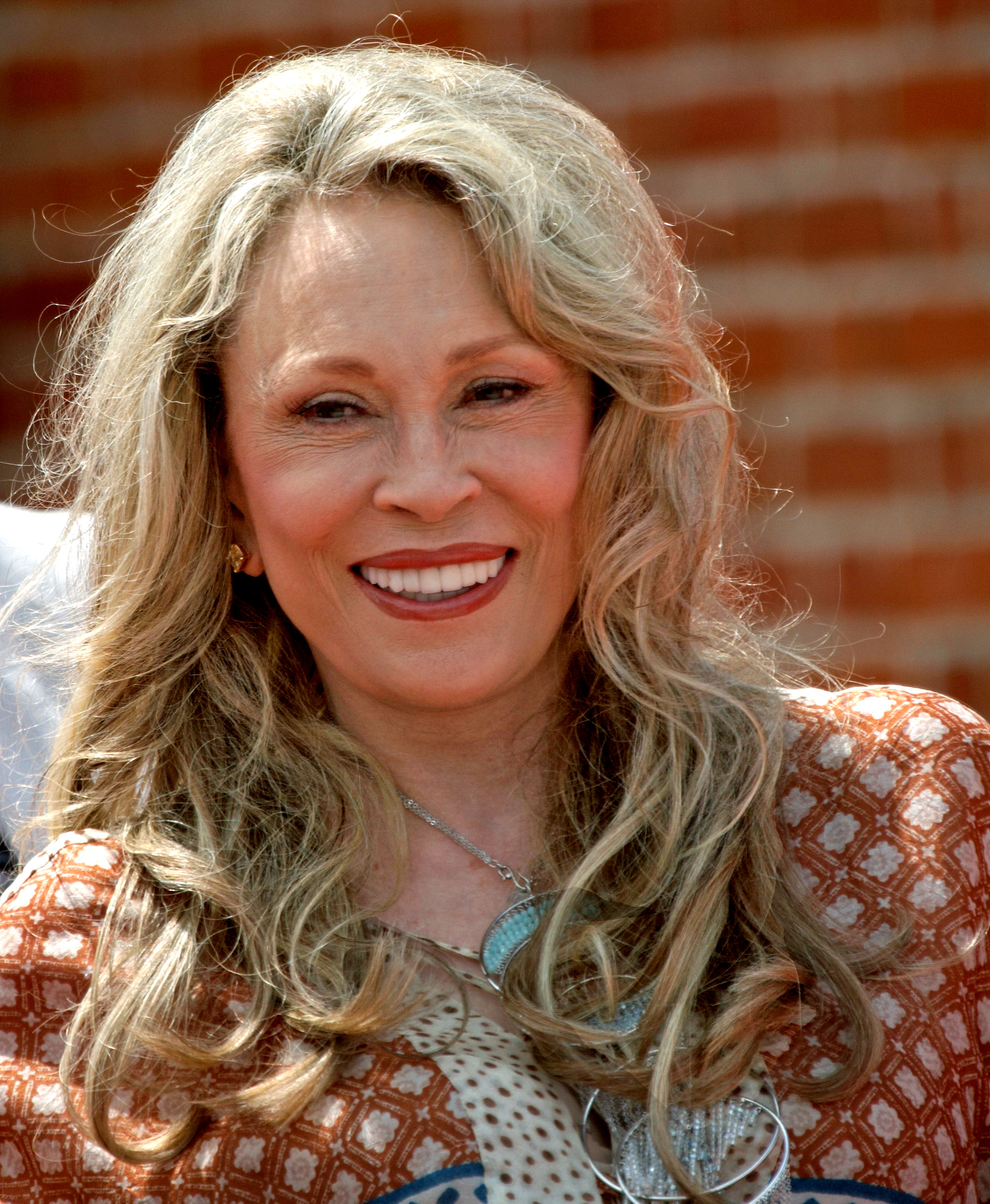
Faye Dunaway

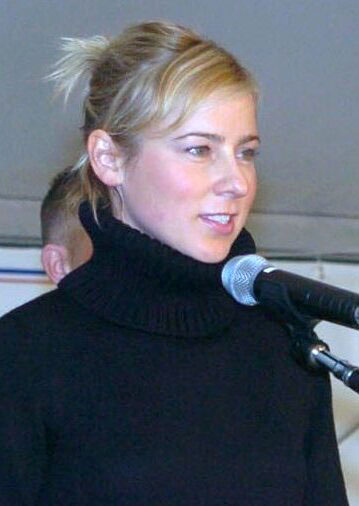
Traylor Howard

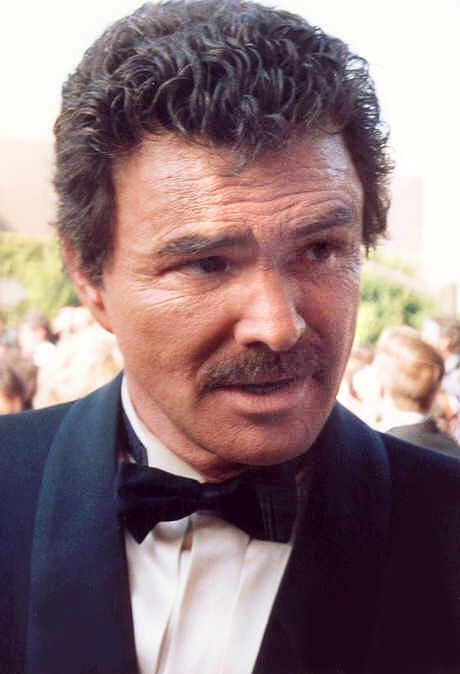
Burt Reynolds

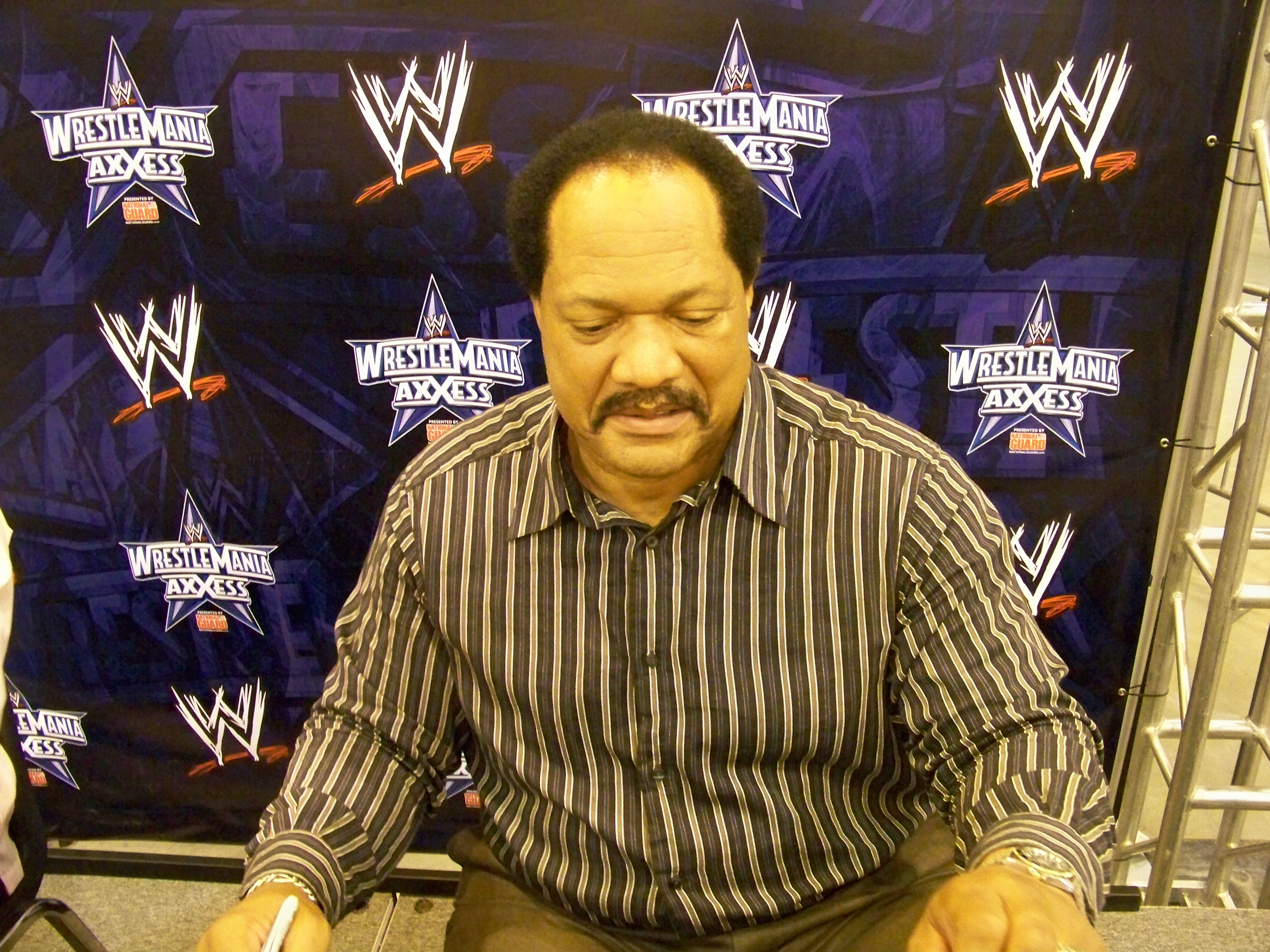
Ron Simmons

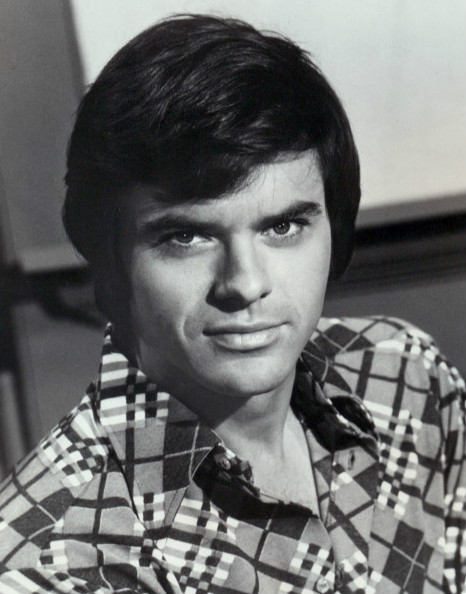
Robert Urich

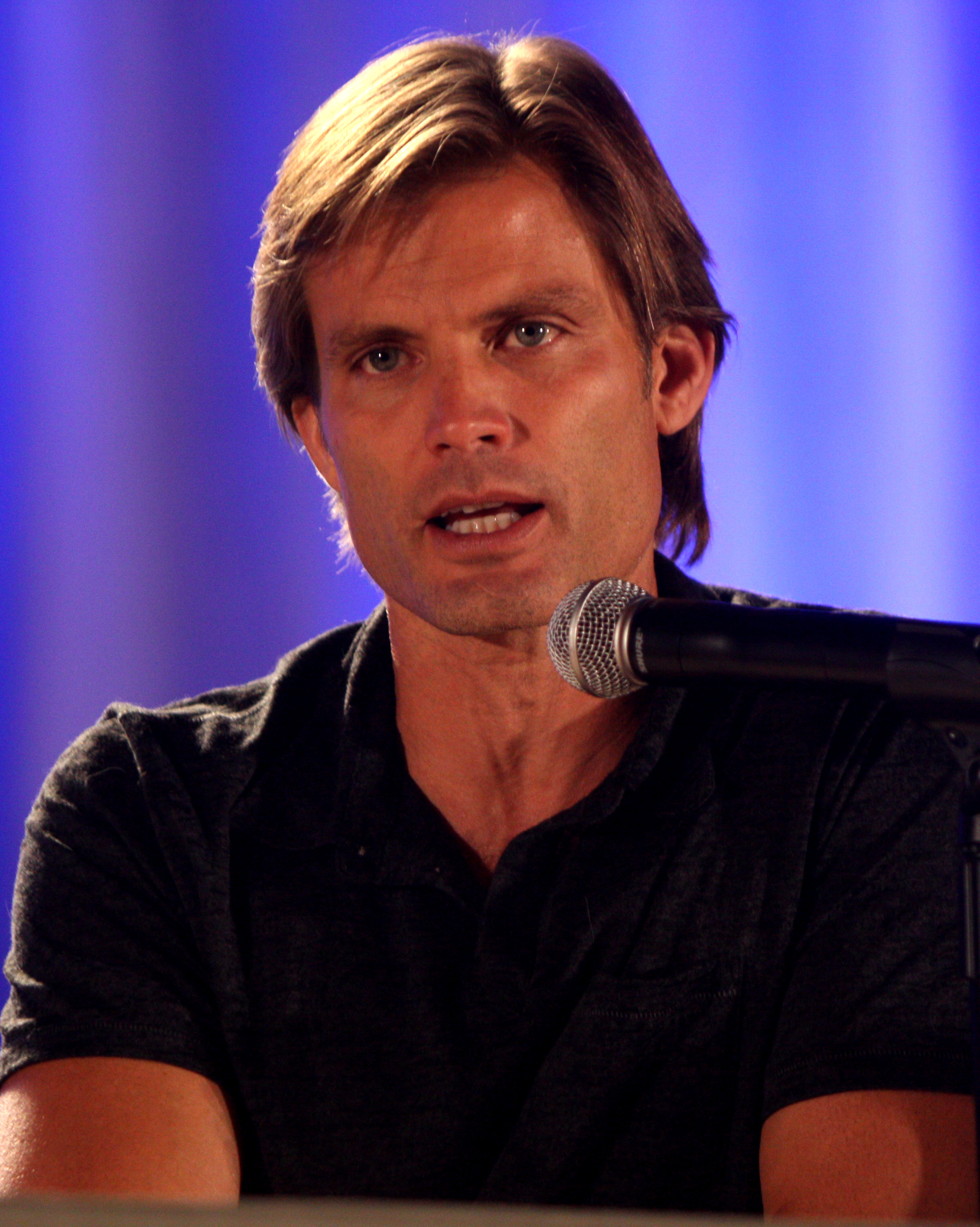
Casper Van Dien

| Alumni | Notability | Reference |
|---|---|---|
| Frankie J. Alvarez | Actor, Looking | |
| Senait Ashenafi | Actress, The Fresh Prince of Bel-Air and General Hospital | |
| King Bach | Actor/Comedian/YouTuber, Fifty Shades of Black, Wild 'N Out and Meet the Blacks | |
| Vanessa Baden | Actress, Gullah Gullah Island, Rosewood, and Kenan & Kel | |
| Dan Bakkedahl | Actor, improvisor, and teacher | |
| Trenesha Biggers | Actress, former wrestler for WWE and TNA | |
| Ricou Browning | Actor, Creature from the Black Lagoon | |
| Matt Cohen | Actor, South of Nowhere, The O.C., and Boogeyman 2 | |
| Gregor Collins | Actor, Ocean's Thirteen | |
| Mekia Cox | Actress, My Brother and Me and Kenan & Kel | |
| Valerie Cruz | Actress, Nip/Tuck, The Dresden Files, and The Devil's Tomb | |
| Dimitri Diatchenko | Actor and musician | |
| Faye Dunaway | Academy Award–winning actress (did not graduate) | |
| Tiffany Fallon | Actress, Playboy Playmate of the Year 2005, co-host of the International Fight League, and former cheerleader for the Atlanta Falcons | |
| Luis Fonsi | Puerto Rican singer, singer-songwriter, composer, and actor | |
| Suzanne Friedline | Actress and voice artist | |
| Joanna García | Actress, Reba, Boston Public, Dawson's Creek, American Pie 2 | |
| Paul Gleason | Actor, The Breakfast Club, Die Hard, Not Another Teen Movie | |
| Montego Glover | Actress, Smash and on Broadway | |
| Andre Gordon | Actor, Modern Family, Scrubs, Campus Ladies | |
| Jennifer Hammon | Actress | |
| Joey Haro | Actor, Awkward | |
| Cheryl Hines | Actress, producer, director, Curb Your Enthusiasm, Campus Ladies, RV (did not graduate) | |
| Andre Holland | Actor, The Knick, Moonlight | |
| Polly Holliday | Actress, Golden Globe winner, nominated for an Emmy Award | |
| Traylor Howard | Actress, Monk on USA network, Son of the Mask | |
| Kevin Kelly | Former ring announcer and manager for the World Wrestling Federation | |
| Nancy Kulp | Actress, The Beverly Hillbillies | |
| Billy Lane | Actor on the Discovery Channel and Biker Build-Off; owner of Choppers Inc. | |
| Jon Locke | Actor, Land of the Lost, Highway Patrol, Bonanza, Gunsmoke | |
| DeLane Matthews | Actress, Dave's World | |
| Michelle McCool | Actress and former WWE wrestler | |
| Gerald McCullouch | Actor, director, screenwriter, and singer | |
| Vic Morrow | Actor, Combat! and Twilight Zone: The Movie | |
| Henry Polic II | Actor, Super Password and Webster | |
| John G. Preston | Stage and film actor | |
| Art Supawatt Purdy | Cannes Film Festival's Un Certain Regard Award-nominated actor, former Warner Music recording artist, Soi Cowboy | |
| Burt Reynolds | Actor, Boogie Nights, The Longest Yard, The Dukes of Hazzard, Deliverance | |
| Chay Santini | Actress and model, Nightstalker, Seeing Other People | |
| Amy Seimetz | Actress, writer, producer, director, and editor, Pet Sematary, Atlanta, The Girlfriend Experience | |
| Sonny Shroyer | Actor, The Dukes of Hazzard, Forrest Gump, The Rainmaker | |
| Richard Simmons | Actor and fitness expert | |
| Ron Simmons | Professional wrestler with WCW and WWE; former football player for the Cleveland Browns in the NFL and the Ottawa Rough Riders in the CFL | |
| Pat Skipper | Actor, American Summer, Wall Street, Lethal Weapon 2, and Predator 2 | |
| J. Smith-Cameron | Actress, Crimes of the Heart, Lend Me a Tenor, Our Country's Good, and The First Wives Club | |
| Tonea Stewart | Actress, In the Heat of the Night | |
| Erik Stolhanske | Actor and director, Super Troopers; co-founder of the comedy troupe Broken Lizard | |
| Gabriel Traversari | Actor, director, writer, and singer | |
| Robert Urich | Actor, Vega$, Spenser: For Hire | |
| Casper Van Dien | Actor, Saved by the Bell, Starship Troopers, and Sleepy Hollow | |
| Sally Wheeler | Actress, Two of a Kind | |
| Joseph Will | Actor, NYPD Blue, Will & Grace | |
| Henry Zebrowski | Actor, comedian, and podcast host, Your Pretty Face is Going to Hell, Heroes Reborn, The Last Podcast on the Left | |

== Government, law, and public policy ==
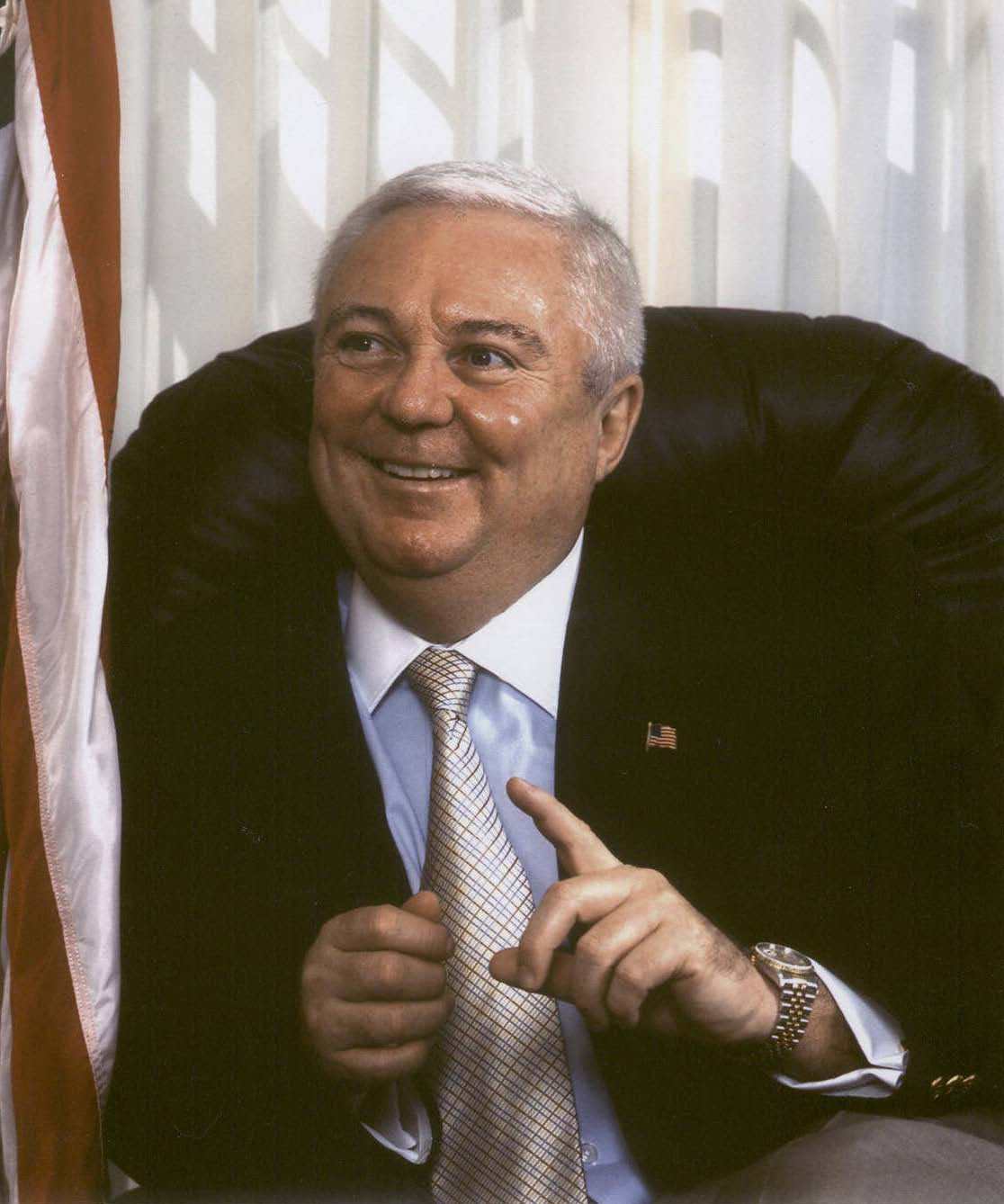
Richard Blankenship

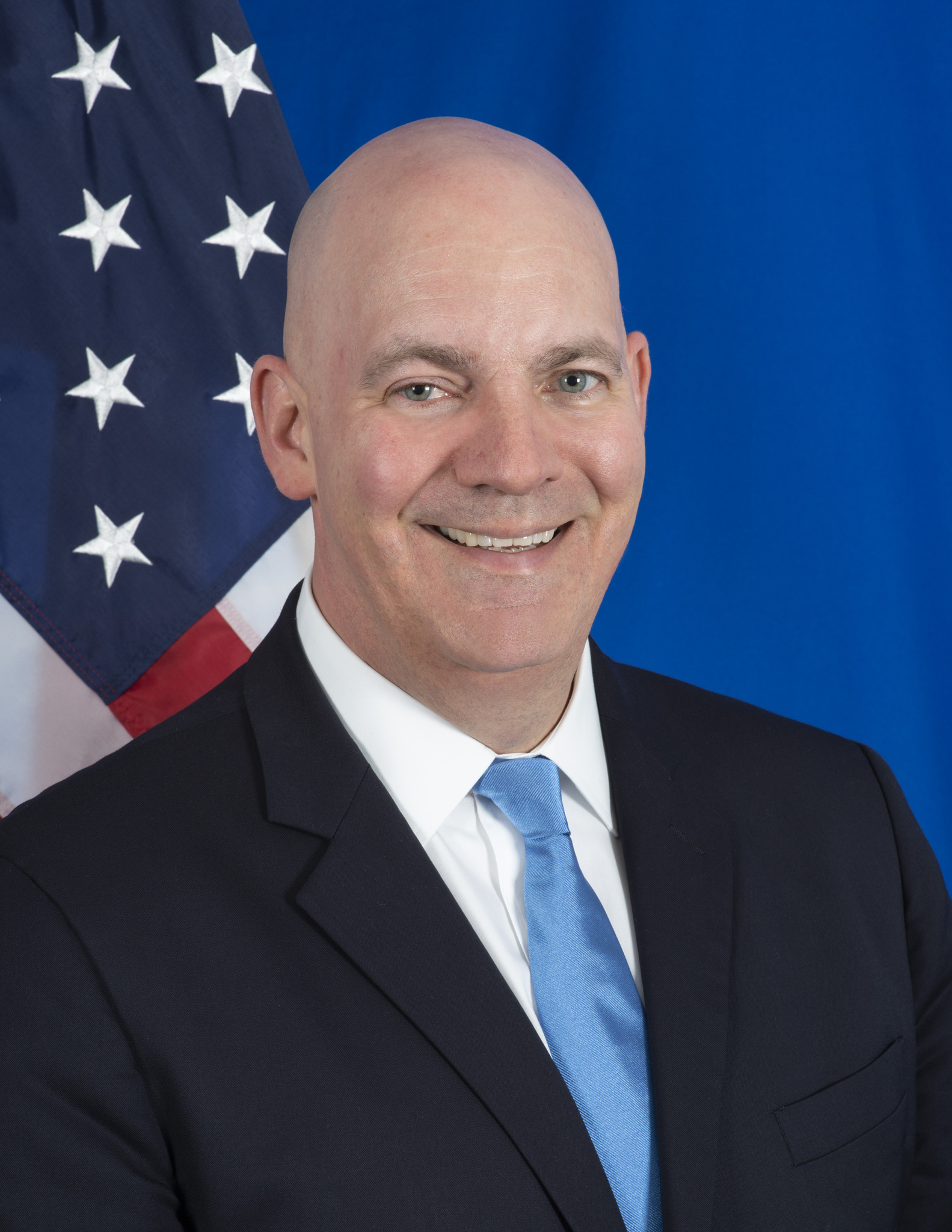
R. Clarke Cooper

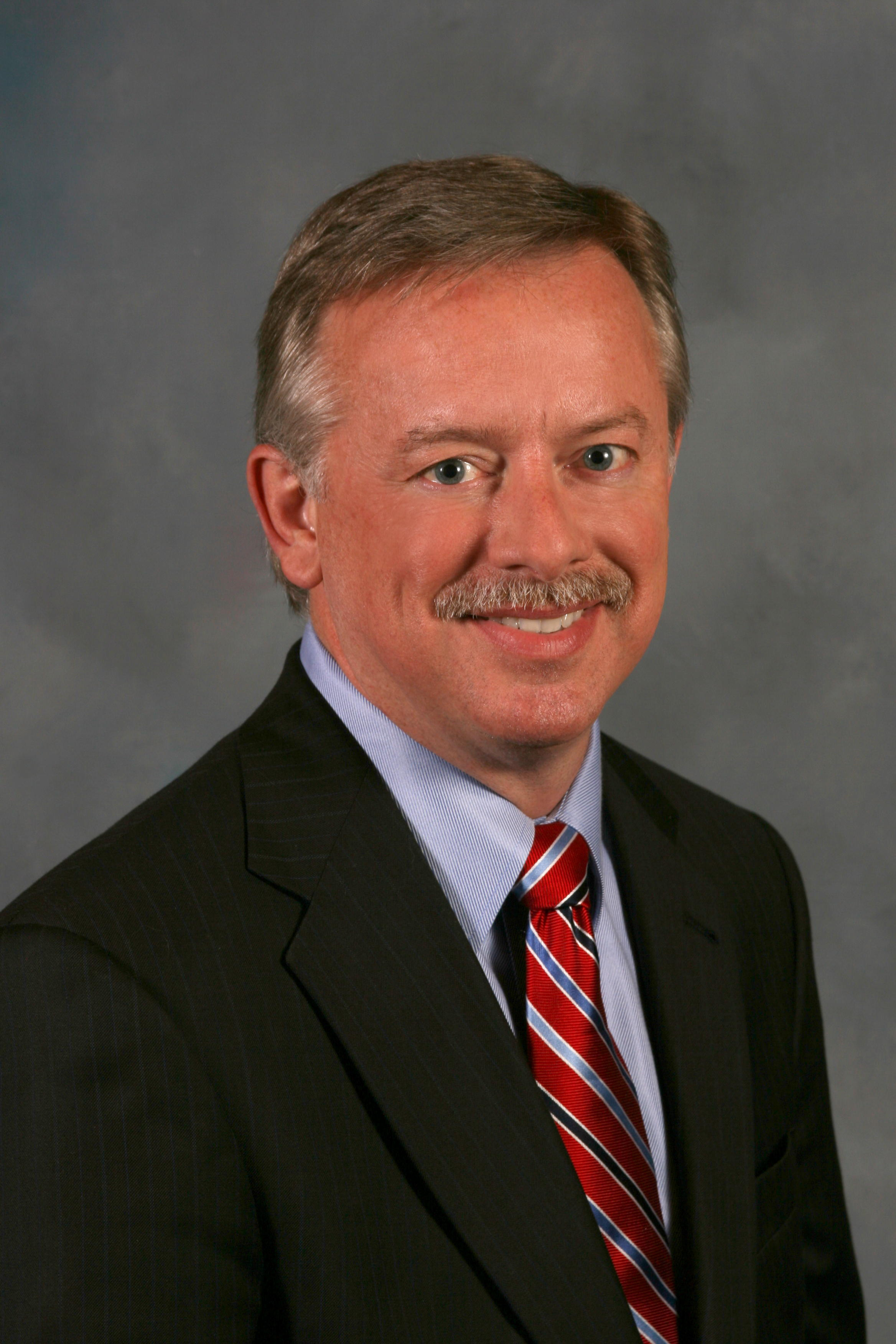
Jeff Kottkamp

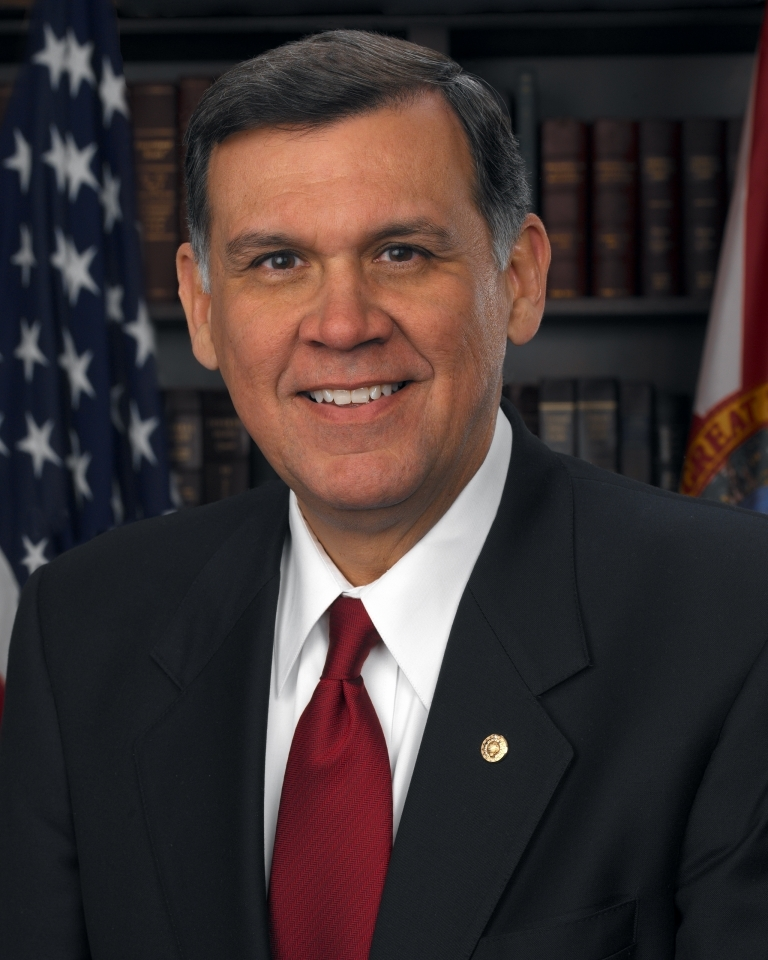
Mel Martinez

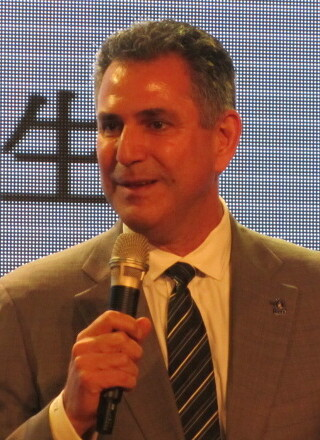
Frank Sanchez

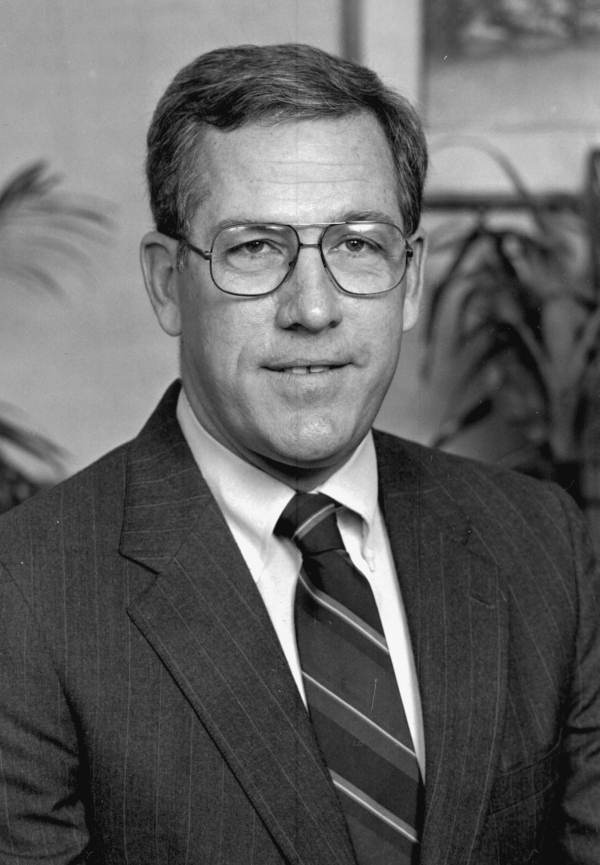
Jim Smith

| Alumni | Notability | Reference |
|---|---|---|
| Chris Anyanwu | Current senator for the Nigerian National Assembly delegation from Imo | |
| Mohammed Nadir Atash | Former senior advisor to the Ministry of Transport for Afghanistan | |
| Michael Berenbaum | Current director of the United States Holocaust Memorial Museum | |
| David Bibb | Former deputy administrator of the General Services Administration, served as acting administrator for a short period | |
| Richard Blankenship | Former United States ambassador to the Bahamas | |
| Jose Ceballos | Government affairs advocate in the Democratic Party | |
| Bradley Cooper | Former minister of recreation for the Bahamas; Olympic discus thrower | |
| R. Clarke Cooper | Diplomat and geopolitical consultant; 19th U.S. assistant secretary of state for political-military affairs | |
| Pearl Long Cullen | First woman to hold a constitutional office in the state of Florida | |
| Charles J. Cunningham | Former director of the Defense Security Service; former lieutenant general in the U.S. Air Force | |
| Val Demings | Former chief of the Orlando Police Department | |
| Richard L. Dugger | Former secretary for the Florida Department of Corrections | |
| Carl W. Ford Jr. | 15th U.S. assistant secretary of state for intelligence and research and head of the Bureau of Intelligence and Research | |
| Mark Gilbert | Former United States ambassador to New Zealand and Samoa | |
| Shevaun Harris | Secretary of the Florida Agency for Health Care Administration | |
| Benedikt Jóhannesson | Icelandic minister of finance, member of the Althing and founder of Viðreisn | |
| Manuel H. Johnson | Former assistant secretary of the U.S. Treasury | |
| LeAlan Jones | Former United States Senate candidate in Illinois; journalist | |
| Mark E. Kaplan | Former secretary of Florida Department of Transportation and chief of staff to Governor Jeb Bush | |
| Brian Kelley | Former CIA officer | |
| Jeff Kottkamp | Former lieutenant governor of Florida | |
| Al Lamberti | Current sheriff of Broward County, Florida | |
| Richard Legendre | Former member of National Assembly of Quebec; former Quebec minister of sports; former professional tennis player | |
| Mel Martinez | Former United States secretary of housing and urban development | |
| Mokgweetsi Masisi | President of the Republic of Botswana, 2018–present | |
| Harold O'Neil | Former director with the United States Department of Defense | |
| Bobby Pittman | Former special assistant to the president and senior director for African affairs to the Bush administration | |
| Aleksandar Popović | Current Serbian minister of energetics | |
| Roger A. Powell | Retired major general in the Australian Army and deputy force commander of the United Nations | |
| Pete Romero | Former U.S. ambassador to Ecuador, and assistant secretary of state | |
| Frank Sanchez | Under secretary of commerce for international trade at the Department of Commerce | |
| Ion Sancho | Current supervisor of elections for Leon County, Florida, gained notoriety in the 2000 presidential recount | |
| Dana Seetahal | Former member of the Senate of Trinidad and Tobago | |
| James C. Smith | Former Florida attorney general; former Florida secretary of state; current chairman of the Florida State University Board of Trustees | |
| Orson Swindle | Former commissioner of the Federal Trade Commission | |
| Jim Towey | Former director of the White House Office of Faith-Based and Community Initiatives | |
| Doan Viet Hoat | Vietnamese academic and dissident, winner of Robert F. Kennedy Human Rights Award | |
| Dale Watson | Former assistant director for the Counterterrorism Division of the Federal Bureau of Investigation; current consultant with Booz Allen Hamilton | |

=== United States Congress ===
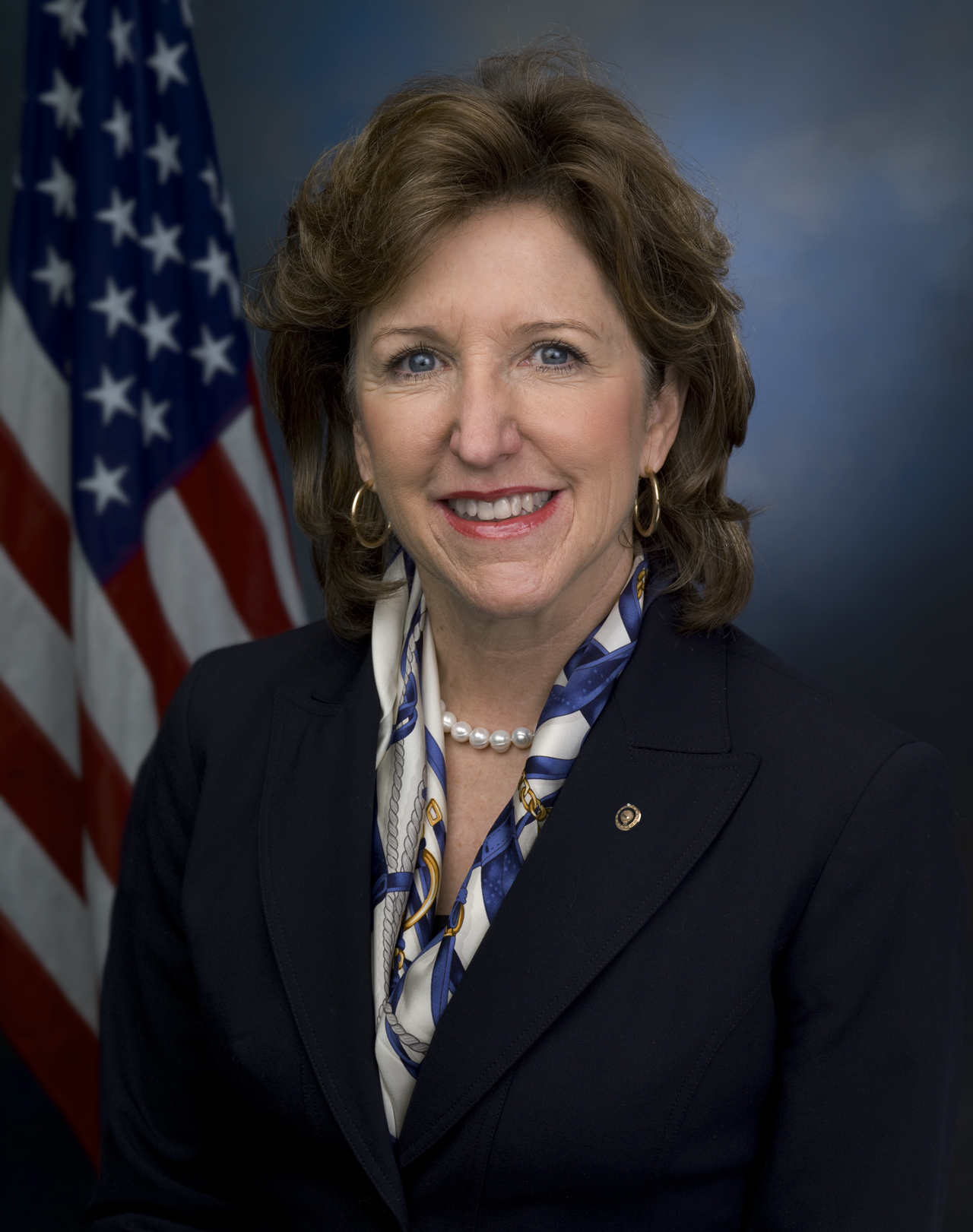
Kay Hagan

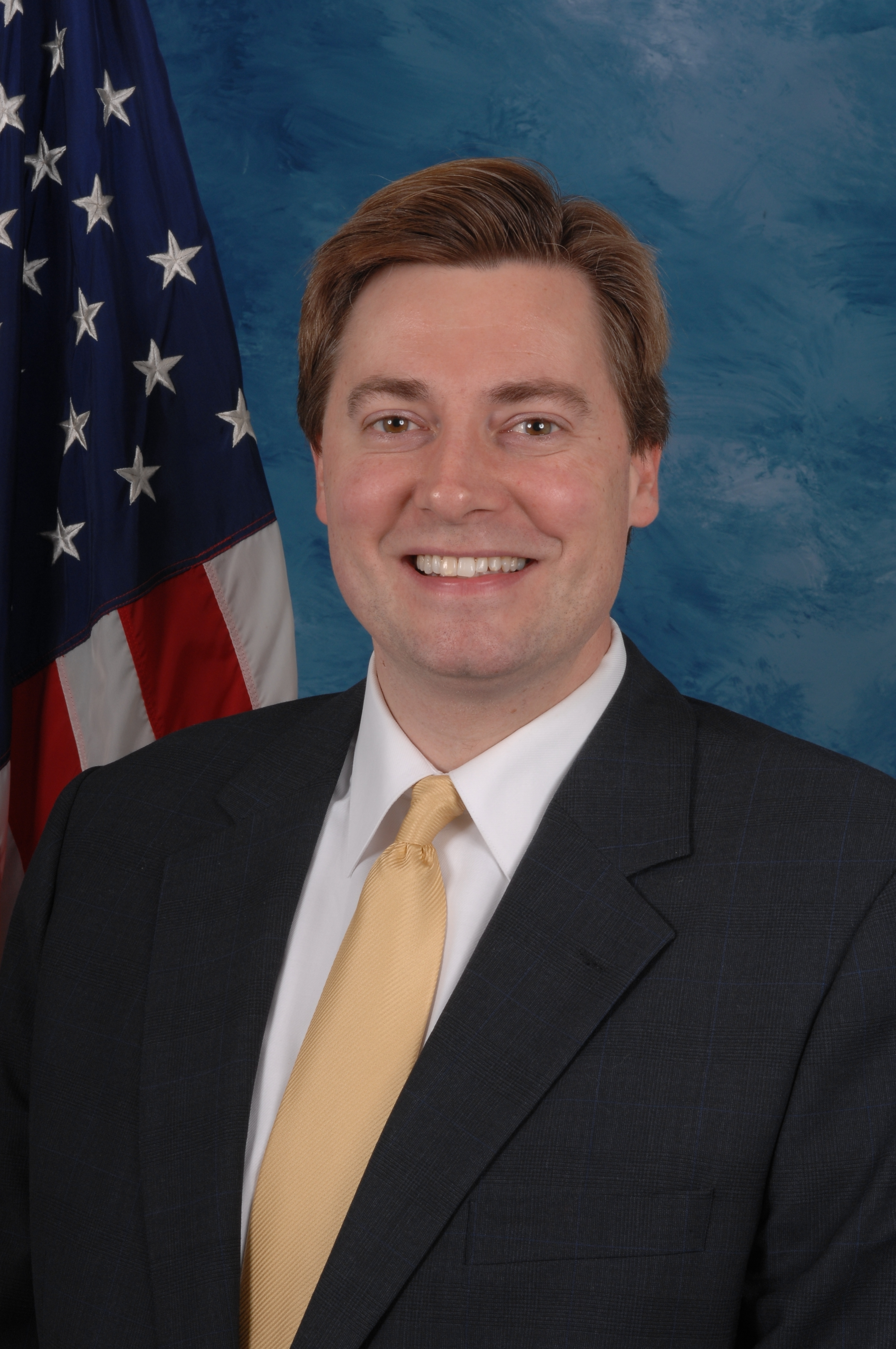
Jason Altmire

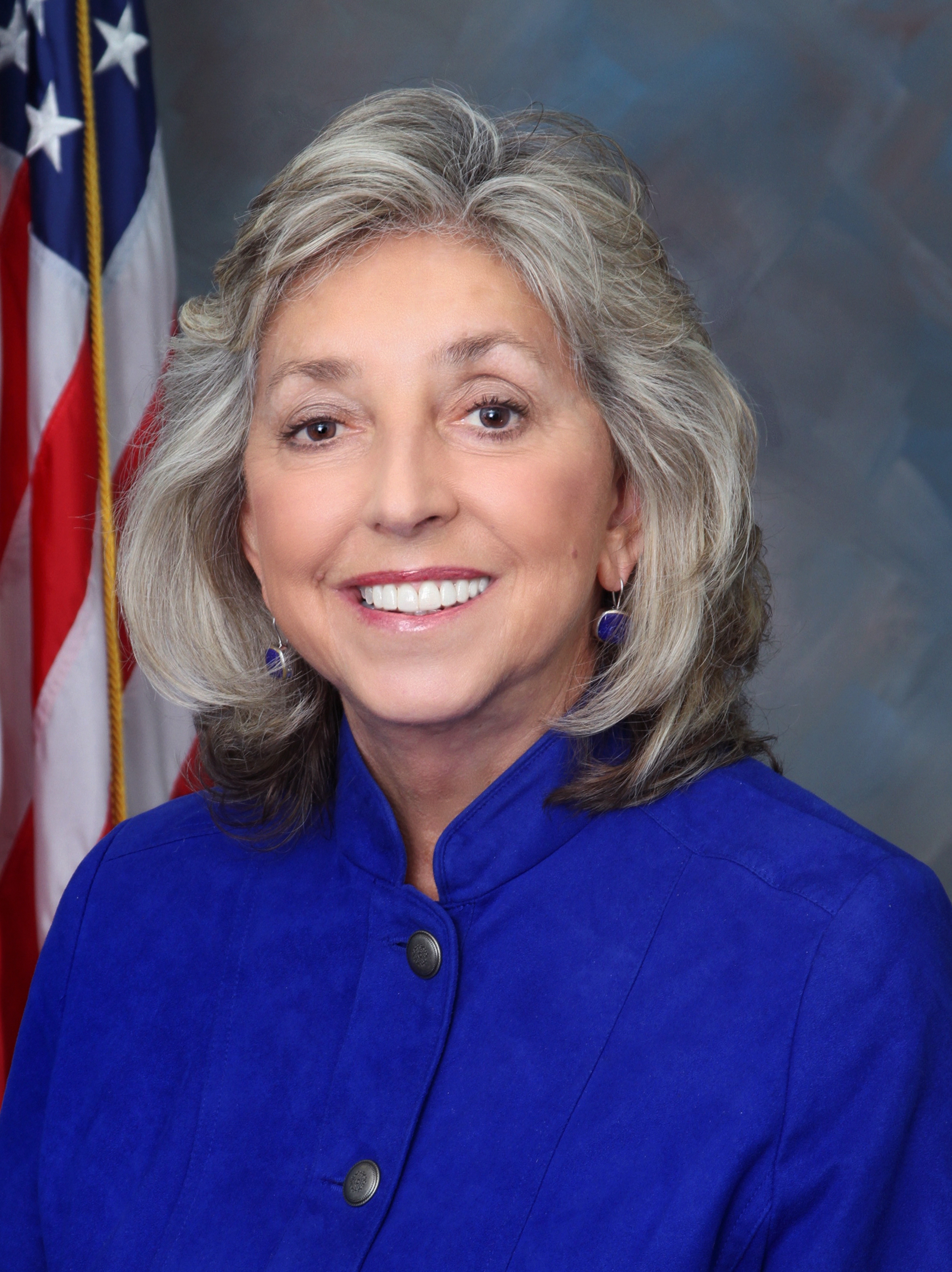
Dina Titus

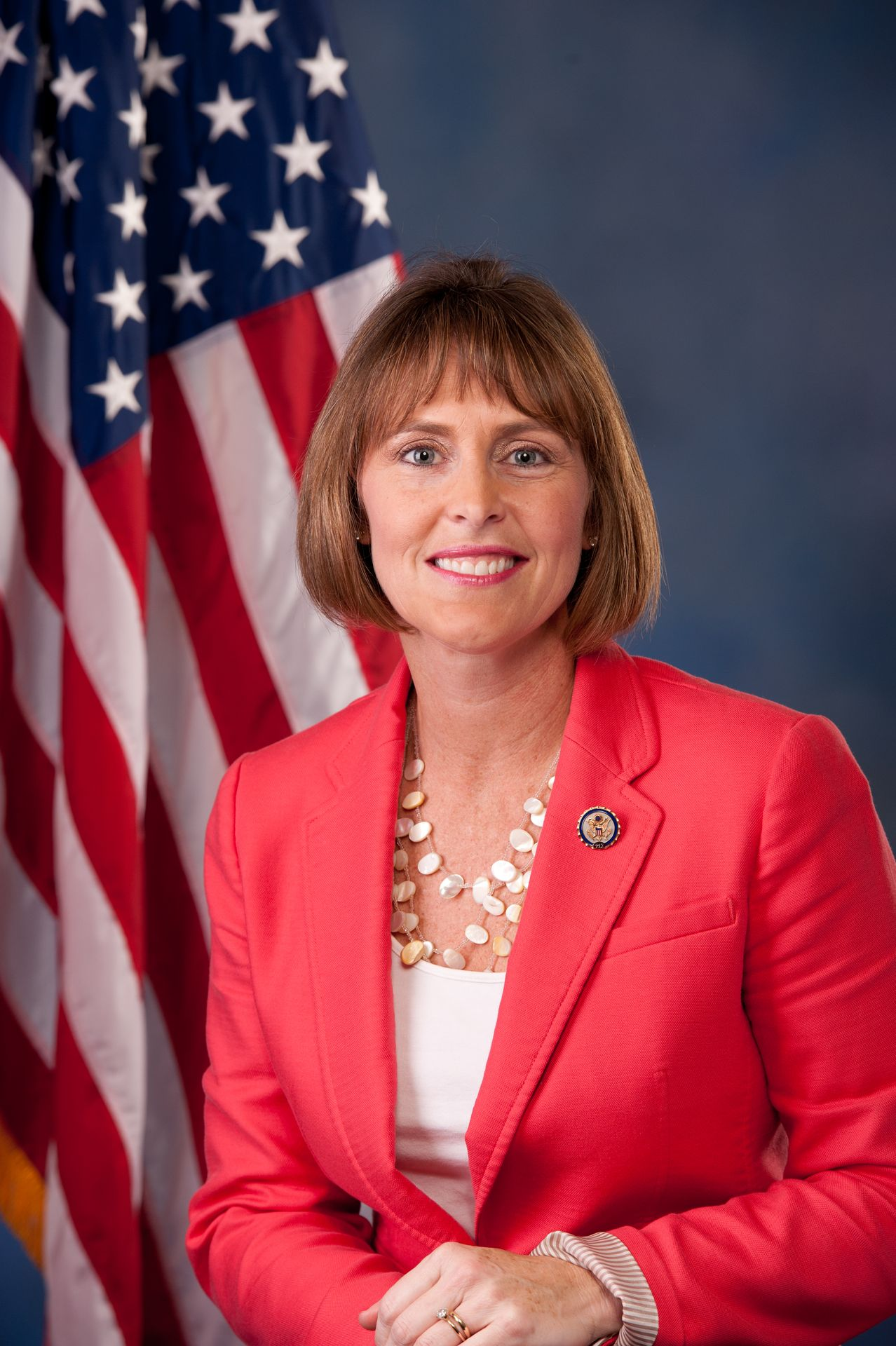
Kathy Castor

| Alumni | Notability | Reference |
|---|---|---|
| Jason Altmire | Former congressman for Pennsylvania's 4th congressional district | |
| Jim Bacchus | Former congressman for Florida's 11th congressional district and Florida's 15th congressional district, current justice and chairman of the Appellate Body of the World Trade Organization | |
| Allen Boyd | Former congressman for Florida's 2nd congressional district | |
| William Carney | Former congressman for New York's 1st congressional district | |
| Kathy Castor | Current congresswoman for Florida's 11th congressional district | |
| Charlie Crist | Former congressman for Florida's 13th congressional district | |
| Val Demings | Former congresswoman for Florida's 10th congressional district | |
| Byron Donalds | Current congressman for Florida's 19th congressional district | |
| Matt Gaetz | Former congressman for Florida's 1st congressional district | |
| Bill Grant | Former congressman for Florida's 2nd congressional district | |
| Kay Hagan | Former United States senator from North Carolina | |
| Al Lawson | Former congressman for Florida's 5th congressional district | |
| Mel Martinez | Former United States senator from Florida | |
| John Rutherford | Current congressman for Florida's 4th congressional district; former sheriff of Jacksonville, Florida | |
| Dina Titus | Current congresswoman for Nevada's 1st congressional district; former congresswoman for Nevada's 3rd congressional district; former member of the Nevada Senate | |
| Emmett Wilson | Former congressman for Florida's 3rd congressional district | |

=== Governors ===
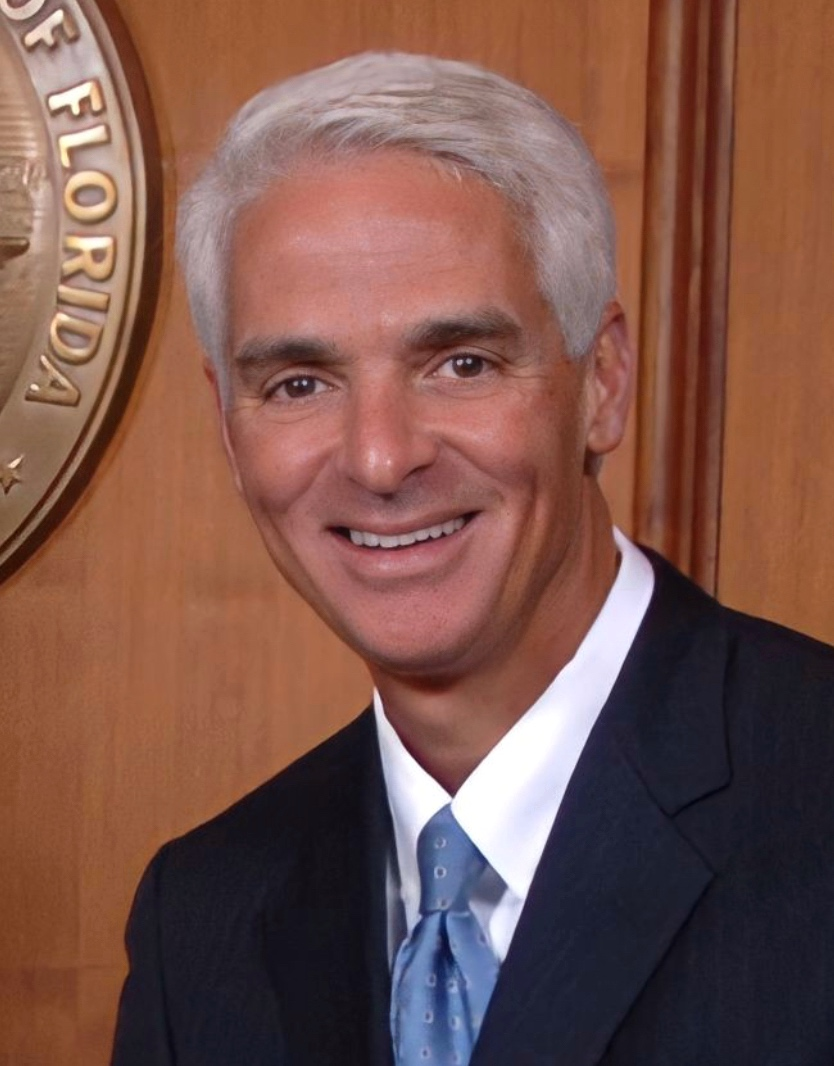
Charlie Crist

| Alumni | Notability | Reference |
|---|---|---|
| Reubin O'Donovan Askew | Former governor of Florida, member of the Florida Senate, United States trade representative, and former candidate for president of the United States | |
| Charlie Crist | Former governor of Florida; former member of Congress; former Florida attorney general; Florida secretary of education; member of the Florida Senate | |
| Parris N. Glendening | Former governor of Maryland and former city councilman in Hyattsville, Maryland | |
| Larry Hogan | Former governor of Maryland | |

=== State senators ===
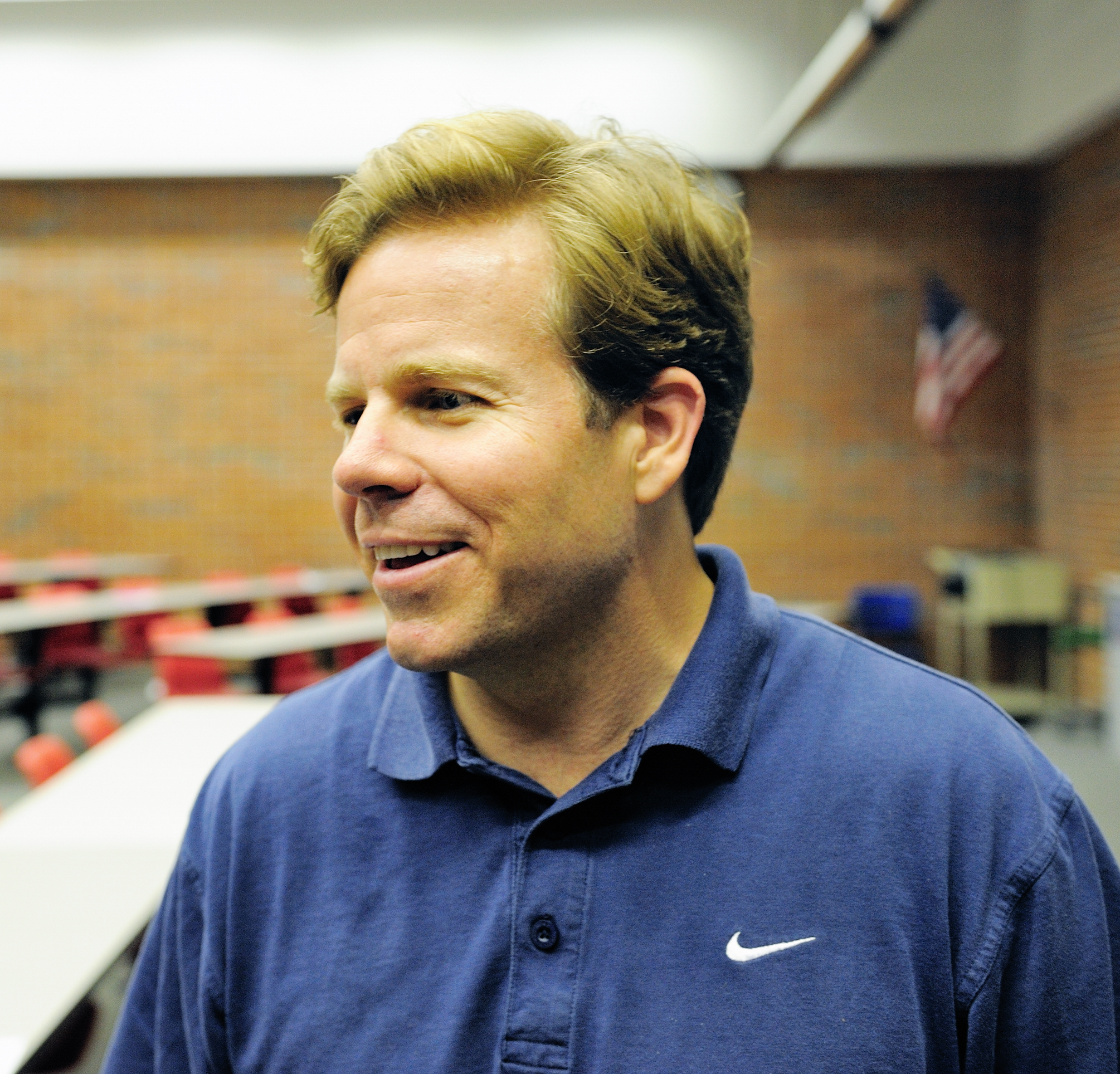
Mike Haridopolos

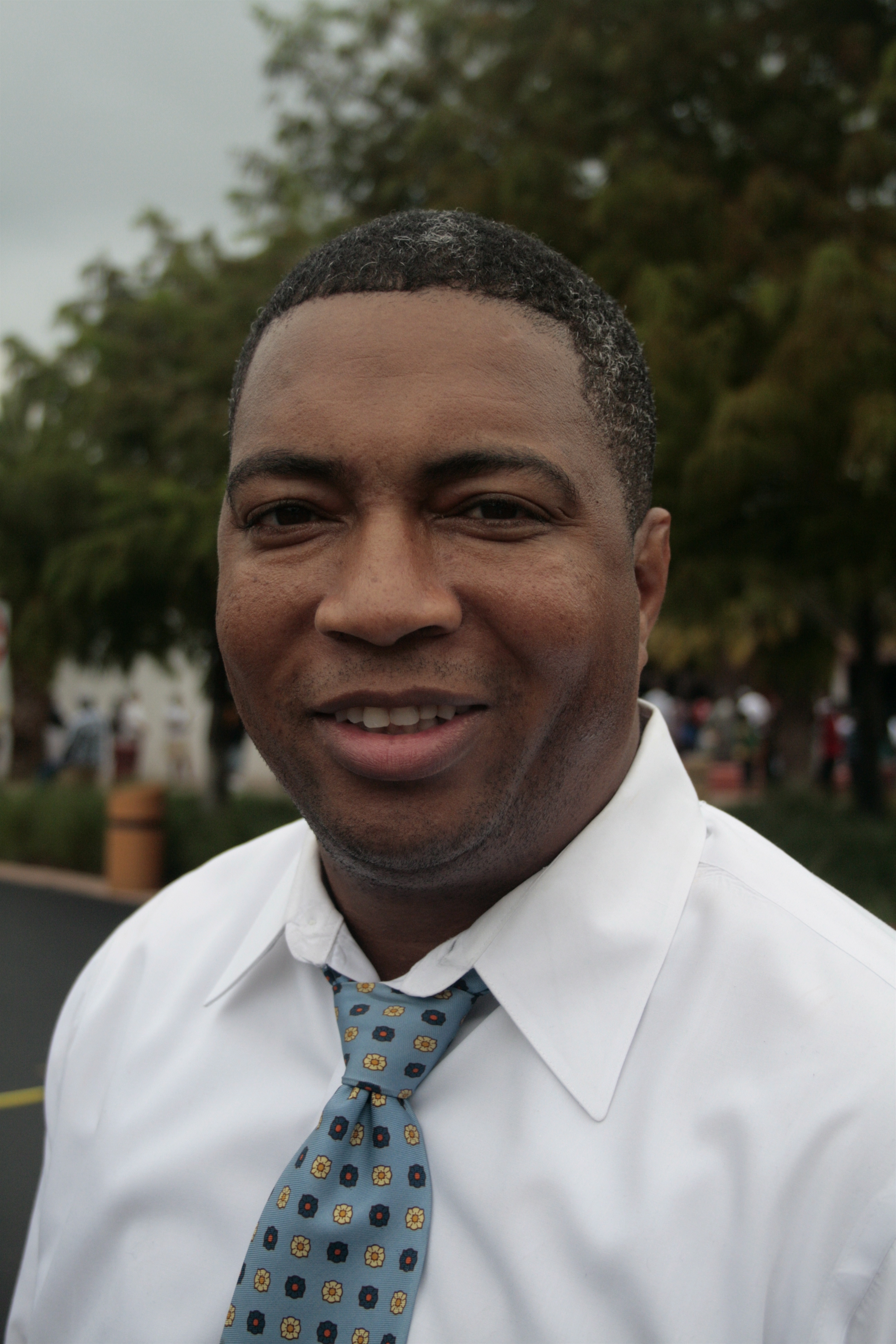
Chris Smith

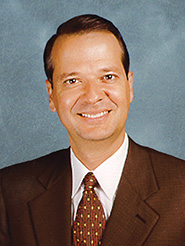
Alex Villalobos

| Alumni | Notability | Reference |
|---|---|---|
| Dempsey Barron | Former president of the Florida Senate | |
| Dennis Baxley | Current member of the Florida Senate and former member of the Florida House of Representatives | |
| Oscar Braynon | Current member of the Florida Senate and former member of the Florida House of Representatives | |
| Michael Brennan | Former member of the Maine Senate and former member of the Maine House of Representatives | |
| W. D. Childers | Former member of the Florida Senate | |
| Charles Dean | Former member of the Florida Senate | |
| Gary Farmer | Current member of the Florida Senate | |
| Steven Geller | Former member of the Florida Senate | |
| Audrey Gibson | Current member of the Florida Senate, and former member of the Florida House of Representatives | |
| Mike Haridopolos | Former president of the Florida Senate | |
| Ken Jenne | Former member for the Florida Senate | |
| Jim King | Former president of the Florida Senate | |
| Al Lawson | Former member of the Florida Senate | |
| John M. McKay | Former president of the Florida Senate | |
| Robert W. McKnight | Former member of the Florida Senate and former member of the Florida House of Representatives | |
| Bill Montford | Current member of the Florida Senate | |
| Steve Oelrich | Former member of the Florida Senate | |
| Bobby Powell | Current member of the Florida Senate | |
| Chris Smith | Former member of the Florida Senate | |
| Geraldine Thompson | Former member of the Florida State and former member of the Florida House of Representatives | |
| John Thrasher | Former member of the Florida Senate, former chairman of the Republican Party of Florida, and former speaker of the Florida House of Representatives | |
| J. Alex Villalobos | Former member of the Florida Senate | |
| Dana Young | Current member of the Florida Senate | |

=== State representatives ===
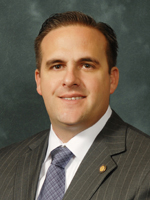
Frank Artiles

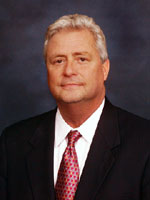
Allan Bense

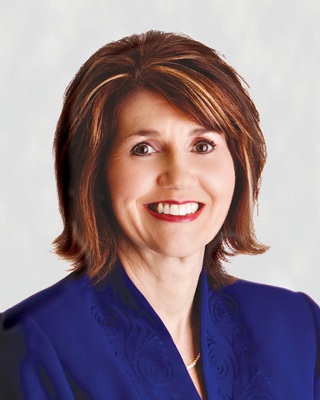
Marti Coley

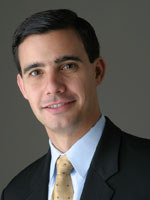
Marcelo Llorente

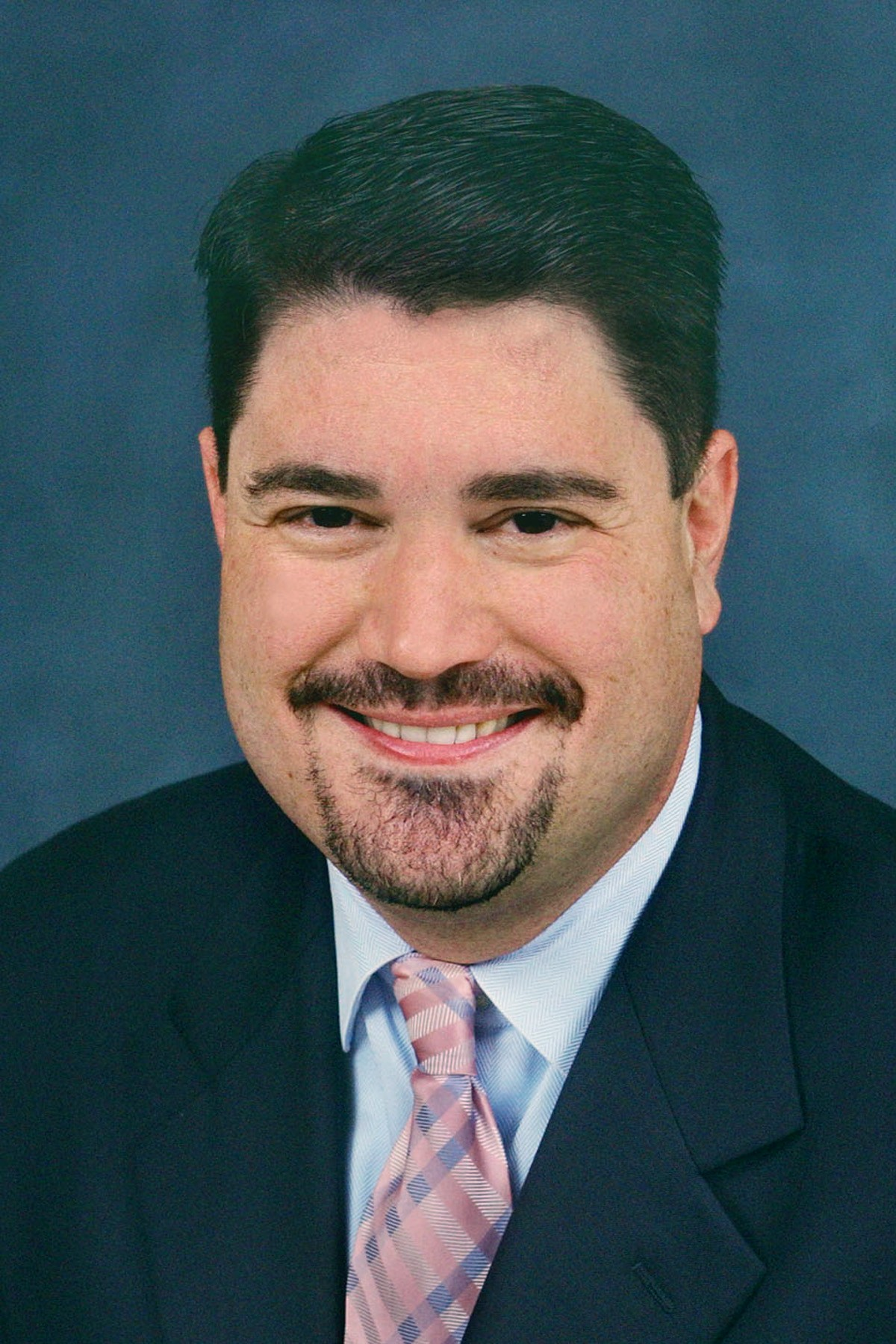
Juan-Carlos Planas

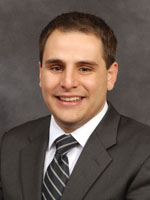
Carlos Trujillo

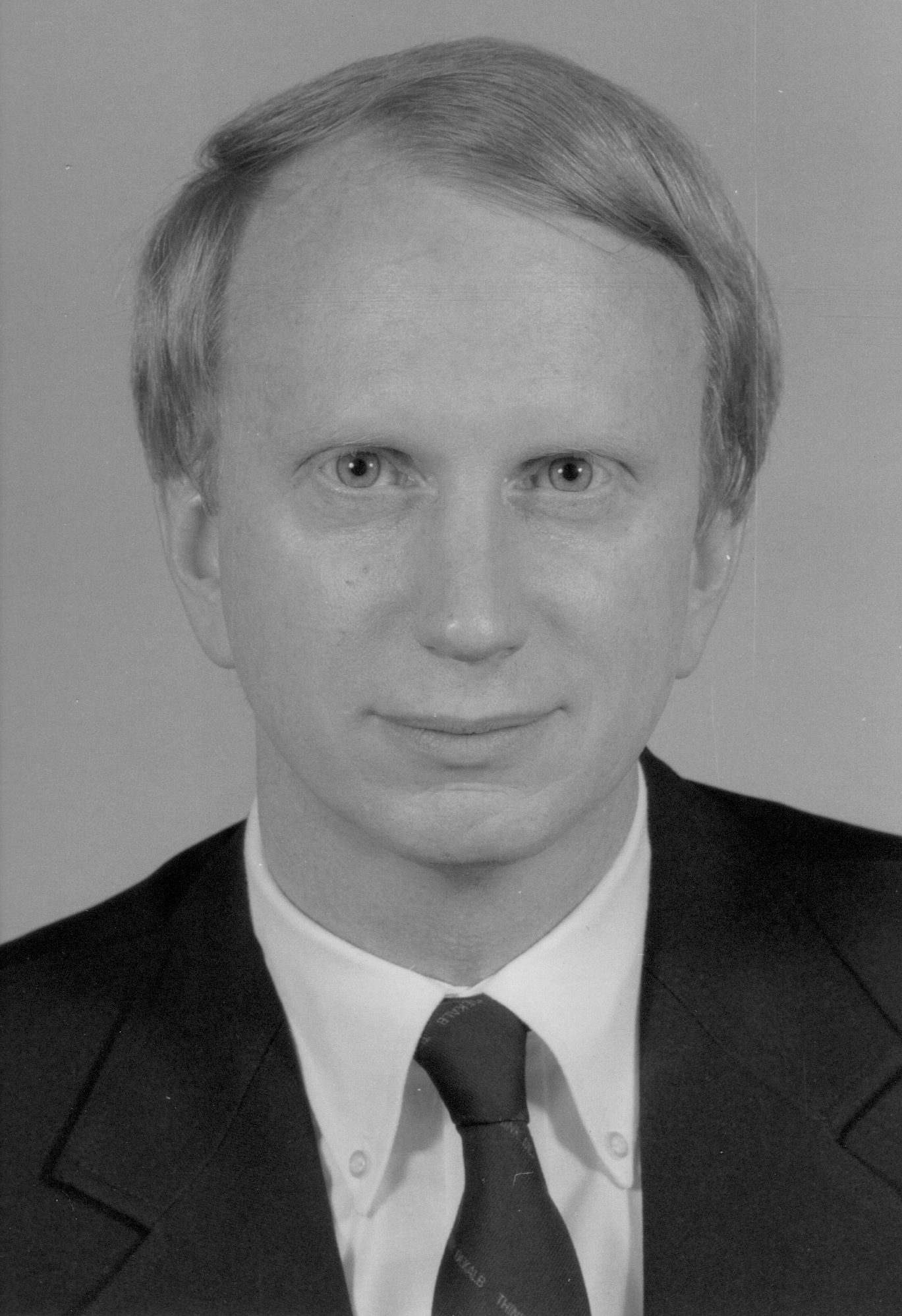
Chesley V. Morton

| Alumni | Notability | Reference |
|---|---|---|
| Martha Alexander | Former member of the North Carolina General Assembly | |
| J. Keith Arnold | Former member of the Florida House of Representatives | |
| Frank Artiles | Former member of the Florida House of Representatives | |
| Leonard Bembry | Former member of the Florida House of Representatives | |
| Allan Bense | Former Speaker of the Florida House of Representatives | |
| Mack Bernard | Former member of the Florida House of Representatives | |
| Halsey Beshears | Current member of the Florida House of Representatives | |
| Jim Boyd | Current member of the Florida House of Representatives | |
| Lindsey Burke | Member of the Kentucky House of Representatives | |
| Cynthia Chestnut | Former member of the Florida House of Representatives | |
| Marti Coley | Former member of the Florida House of Representatives | |
| Neil Combee | Current member of the Florida House of Representatives | |
| Kimberly Daniels | Current member of the Florida House of Representatives | |
| Carl Domino | Former member of the Florida House of Representatives | |
| Terry Fields | Former member of the Florida House of Representatives | |
| Erik Fresen | Former member of the Florida House of Representatives | |
| Matt Gaetz | Former member of the Florida House of Representatives, current member of the United States House of Representatives | |
| Greg Gay | Former member of the Florida House of Representatives | |
| Joe Geller | Current member of the Florida House of Representatives | |
| Tom Goodson | Current member of the Florida House of Representatives | |
| Tom Grady | Former member of the Florida House of Representatives | |
| Joe Gruters | Current member of the Florida House of Representatives | |
| Chris Hart IV | Former member of the Florida House of Representatives | |
| Adam Hasner | Former majority leader for the Florida House of Representatives | |
| Deborah Horan | Former member of the Florida House of Representatives | |
| Clay Ingram | Current member of the Florida House of Representative | |
| Evan Jenne | Current member of the Florida House of Representatives | |
| Bolley Johnson | Former speaker of the Florida House of Representatives | |
| Everett Kelly | Former member of the Florida House of Representatives | |
| Kurt Kelly | Former member of the Florida House of Representatives | |
| Marcelo Llorente | Former member of the Florida House of Representatives | |
| Mark Mahon | Former member of the Florida House of Representatives | |
| Anne McGihon | Former member of the Colorado House of Representatives | |
| Sharon Merchant | Former member of the Florida House of Representatives | |
| Larry Metz | Current member of the Florida House of Representatives | |
| Chesley V. Morton | Former member of the Georgia House of Representatives | |
| Jimmy Patronis | Former member of the Florida House of Representatives | |
| Juan-Carlos Planas | Former member of the Florida House of Representatives | |
| Mel Ponder | Current member of the Florida House of Representatives | |
| Elizabeth W. Porter | Current member of the Florida House of Representatives | |
| Holly Raschein | Current member of the Florida House of Representatives | |
| Dan Raulerson | Current member of the Florida House of Representatives | |
| Curtis Richardson | Former member of the Florida House of Representatives | |
| Beryl Roberts | Former member of the Florida House of Representatives | |
| Ray Sansom | Former Speaker of the Florida House of Representatives | |
| Michael Scionti | Former member of the Florida House of Representatives | |
| Said Sharbini | Former member of the Colorado House of Representatives | |
| Ken Sorensen | Former member of the Florida House of Representatives | |
| Ross Spano | Current member of the Florida House of Representatives | |
| Beverly Burnsed Spencer | Former member of the Florida House of Representatives | |
| John K. Stargel | Former member of the Florida House of Representatives | |
| Jason Steele | Former member of the Florida House of Representatives | |
| Jim K. Tillman | Former member of the Florida House of Representatives | |
| Trey Traviesa | Former member of the Florida House of Representatives | |
| Carlos Trujillo | Current member of the Florida House of Representatives | |
| Leslie Waters | Former member of the Florida House of Representatives | |
| Mike Weinstein | Former member of the Florida House of Representatives | |
| Wayne Westmark | Former member of the Florida House of Representatives | |
| John Wood | Former member of the Florida House of Representatives | |

=== Mayors ===
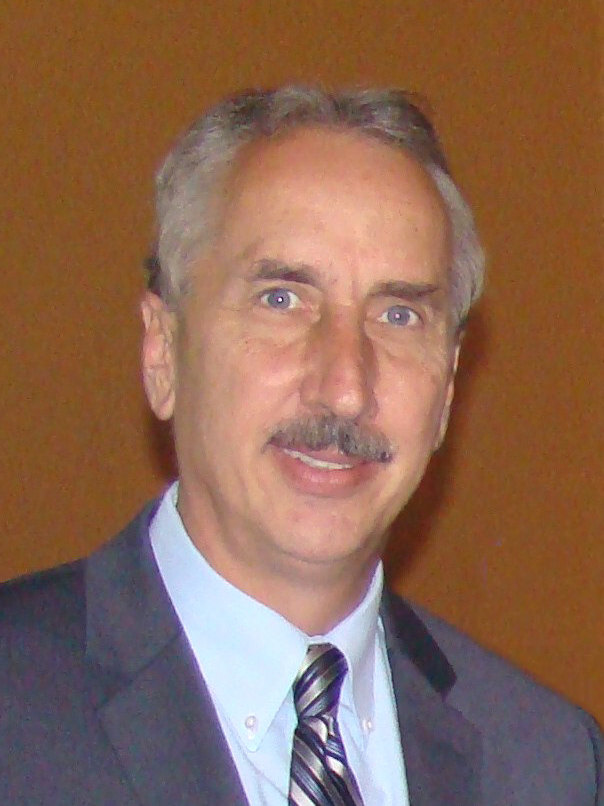
Rick Baker

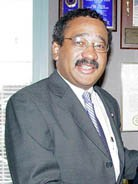
John Marks

| Alumni | Notability | Reference |
|---|---|---|
| Art Agnos | Former mayor of San Francisco, California | |
| Rick Baker | Former mayor of St. Petersburg, Florida | |
| Michael F. Brennan | Current mayor of Portland, Maine | |
| Rich Crotty | Former mayor of Orange County, Florida | |
| Donna Deegan | Current mayor of Jacksonville, Florida | |
| Mike Halfacre | Current mayor in New Jersey and attorney | |
| Teresa Jacobs | Current mayor of Orange County, Florida | |
| Ken Keechl | Current mayor of Broward County, Florida | |
| David T. Kennedy | Former mayor of Miami, Florida | |
| Scott Maddox | Former mayor of Tallahassee, Florida, former chairman of the Florida Democratic Party, ran unsuccessfully for governor of Florida | |
| John Marks | Former mayor of Tallahassee, Florida | |
| Jack McLean | Former mayor of Tallahassee, Florida | |
| Morgan McPherson | Current mayor of Key West, Florida | |

=== Law ===
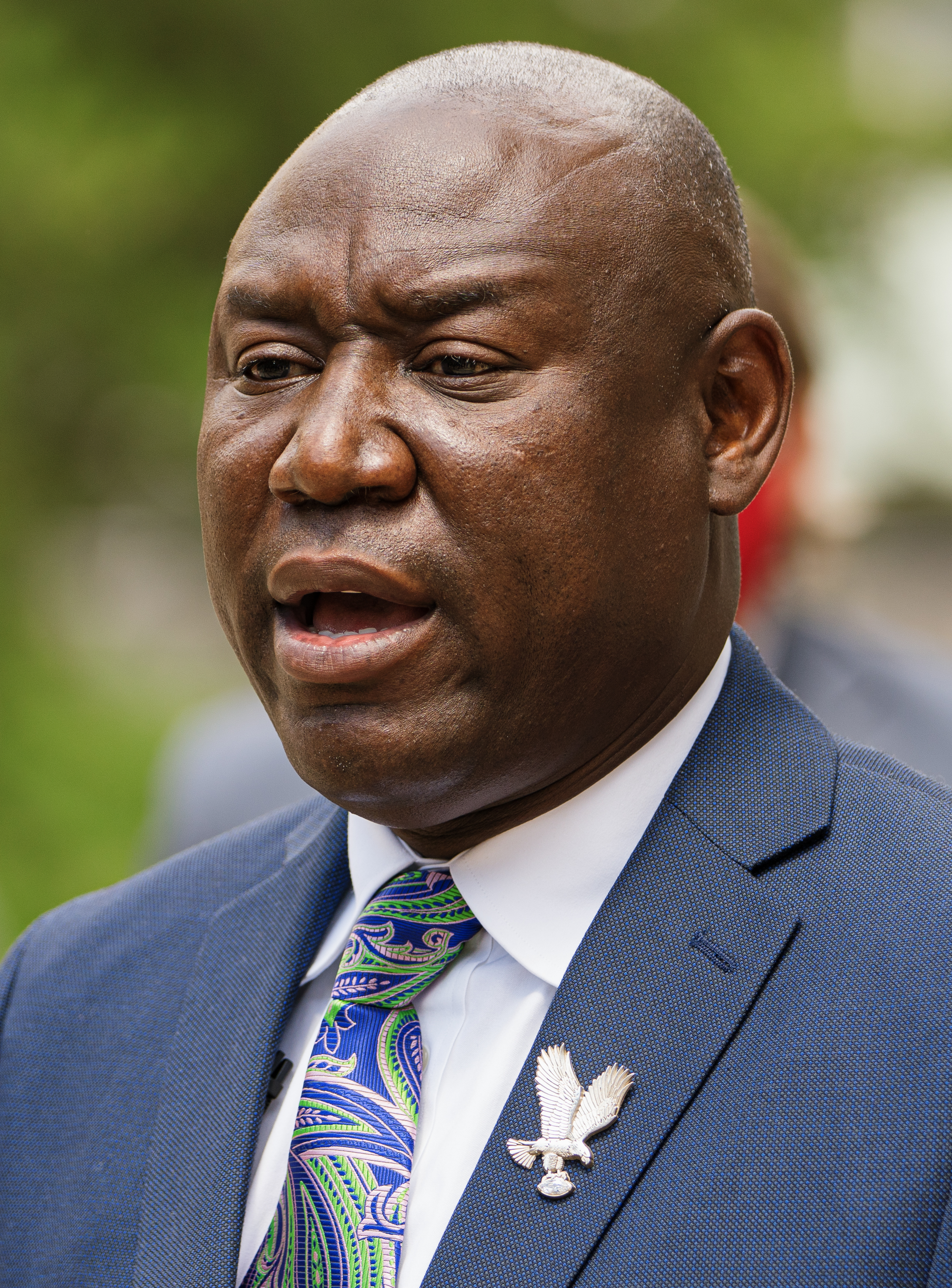
Benjamin Crump

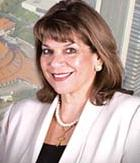
Angela Corey

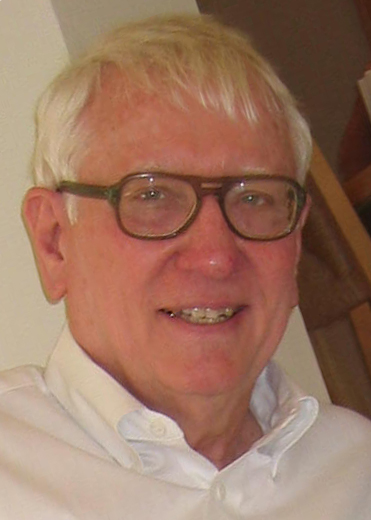
Bruce Jacob

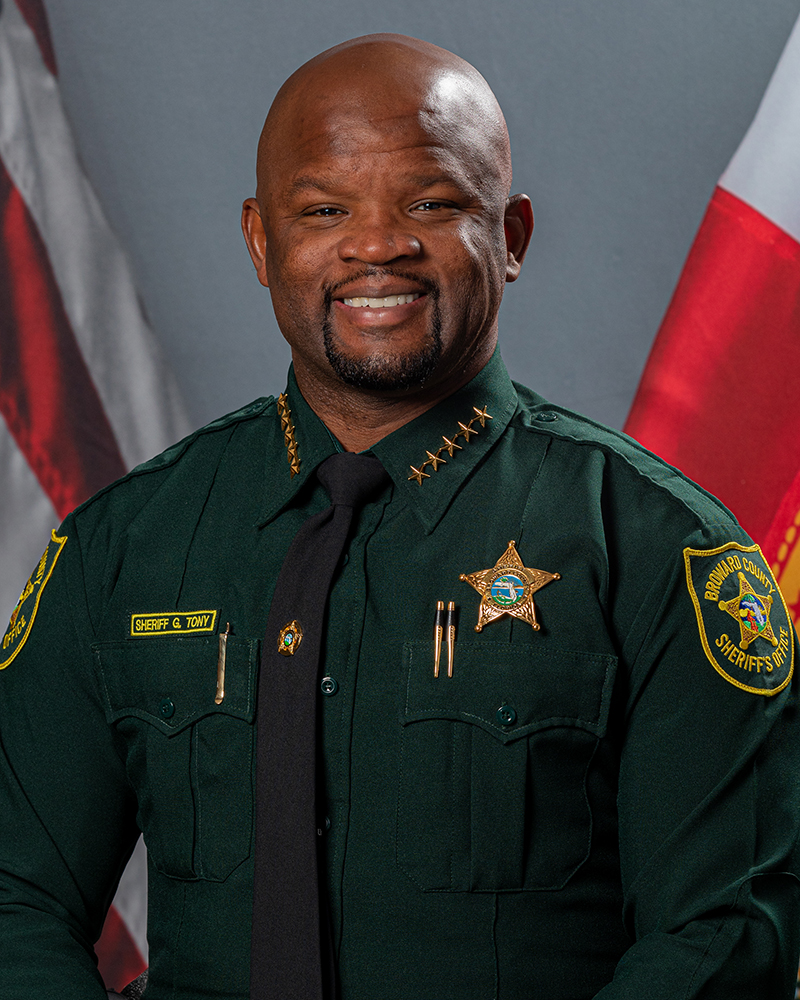
Gregory Tony

| Alumni | Notability | Reference |
|---|---|---|
| Jose Baez | Lead attorney for Casey Anthony in the death of Caylee Anthony trial | |
| Thomas E. Baker | Attorney, writer, professor at Florida International University College of Law | |
| Barry Cohen | Personal injury and criminal attorney | |
| Angela Corey | Former state attorney for Florida's Fourth Judicial Circuit Court | |
| Benjamin Crump | Lead attorney for the family of Trayvon Martin | |
| Jerry Demings | Sheriff of Orange County, Florida | |
| Mike Halfacre | Director of the New Jersey Division of Alcoholic Beverage Control | |
| Tim Howard | Current director of the Northeastern University's Executive Doctorate Program in Law and Policy; former assistant attorney general of Florida | |
| Bruce Jacob | Former assistant attorney general for Florida, prosecuted in Gideon v. Wainwright | |
| Marlins Man | Nickname of Laurence Leavy, attorney and well known sports fan | |
| Craig McCarthy | Attorney on a number of high-profile cases and candidate for the Florida House of Representatives | |
| Mark O'Mara | Defense attorney | |
| Gary Pajcic | Attorney and philanthropist | |
| Daryl Parks | Attorney and former president of the National Bar Association | |
| Gregory Tony | Sheriff of Broward County, Florida | |

==== Judges ====
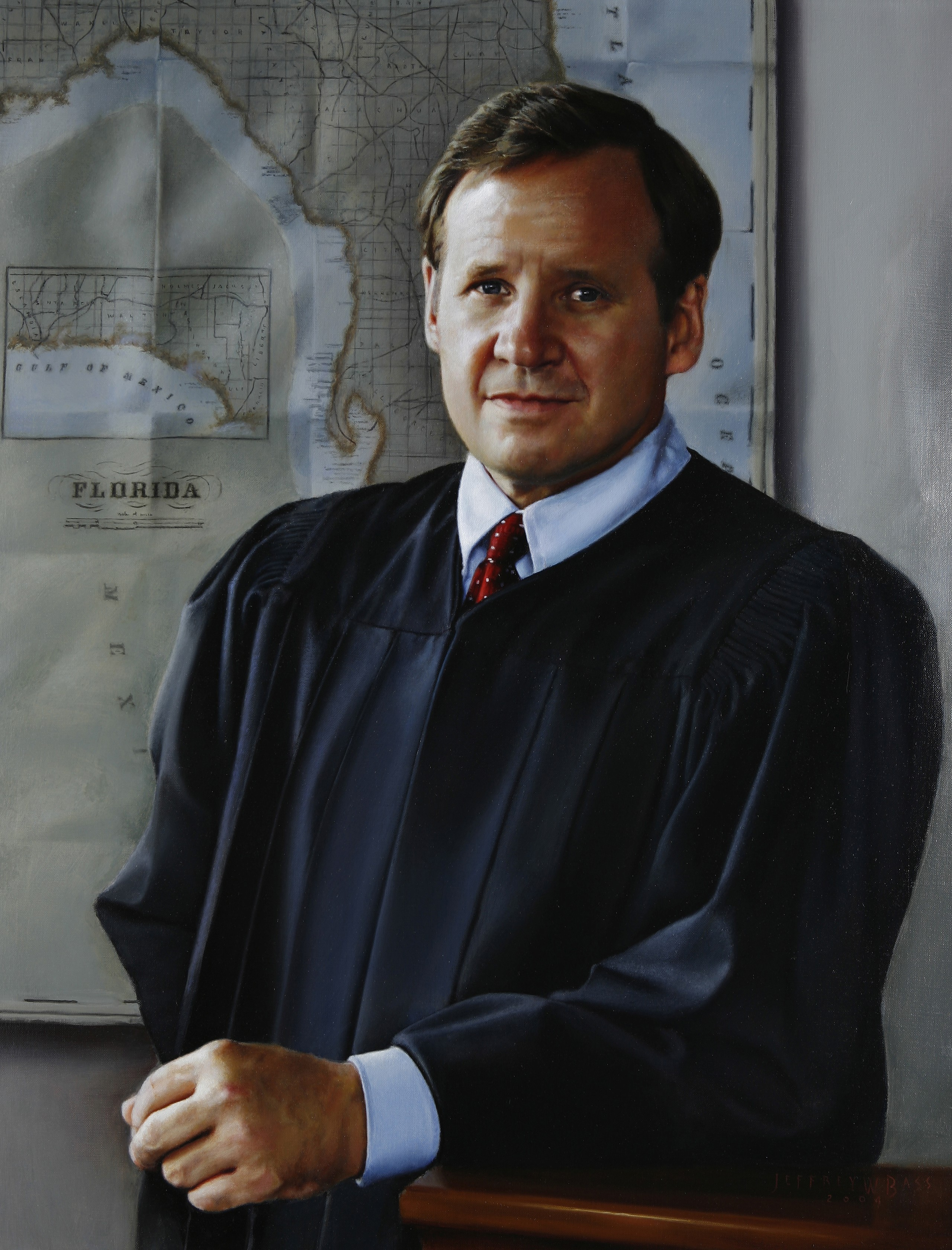
Kenneth Bell

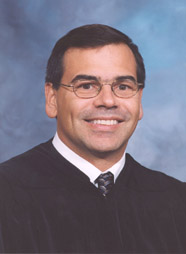
Raoul Cantero

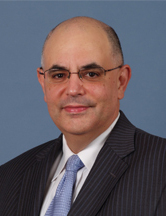
Rudy Contreras

| Alumni | Notability | Reference |
|---|---|---|
| John Antoon | Current United States district judge | |
| Kenneth B. Bell | Former Florida Supreme Court justice | |
| Susan H. Black | Current U.S. Court of Appeals judge | |
| Susan C. Bucklew | Current United States district judge | |
| Raoul G. Cantero, III | Former Florida Supreme Court justice | |
| Lacey A. Collier | Current United States district judge | |
| Rudolph Contreras | Current United States district judge | |
| Zina Pickens Cruse | 20th Judicial Circuit judge in St. Clair County, Illinois, first African-American woman to serve in the circuit | |
| W. Thomas Cumbie | Current senior judge for the United States Air Force; colonel | |
| Paul Danielson | Current justice on the Arkansas Supreme Court | |
| George Greer | Judge; presided over the Terri Schiavo case; presided over Hulk Hogan's divorce case in January 2008 | |
| Kim Hammond | Circuit court judge, former quarterback of the Florida State Seminoles | |
| Robert L. Hinkle | Current United States district judge | |
| David L. Middlebrooks | Former United States district judge | |
| Kevin Michael Moore | Current United States district judge | |
| Ricky Polston | Former chief justice for the Florida Supreme Court | |
| Mary Stenson Scriven | Current United States district judge | |

== Journalism and media ==
Cathy Areu

| Alumni | Notability | Reference |
|---|---|---|
| Cathy Areu | News analyst; the "Liberal Sherpa" on Fox News's Tucker Carlson Tonight; founder and publisher of Catalina magazine | |
| Doug Bandow | Political writer; former columnist and fellow for the Cato Institute | |
| Anthony Cormier | Winner of the Pulitzer Prize for Investigative Journalism | |
| Dayle Hinman | FBI-trained criminal profiler | |
| Anne Hull | National staff writer for the Washington Post | |
| LeAlan Jones | Journalist | |
| Danny Kanell | Currently the host of ESPNU's late-night sports and humor show UNITE, and former professional football player with the NFL | |
| Mike McQueen | Journalist | |
| Carol Marbin Miller | Senior investigative reporter, Miami Herald | |
| Jeffrey Scott Shapiro | Practicing attorney, investigative journalist | |
| Peter Tom Willis | Former commentator for the Florida State Seminoles | |

=== Anchors and correspondents ===
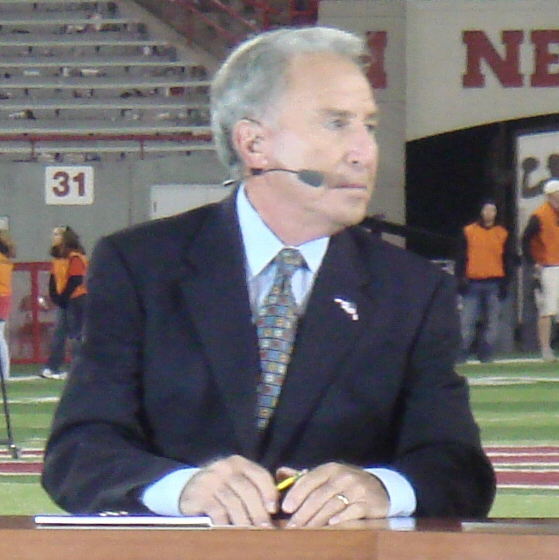
Lee Corso

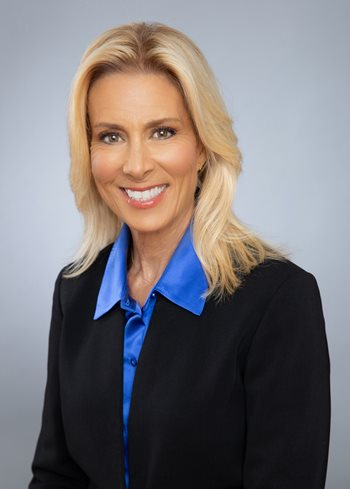
Donna Deegan

| Alumni | Notability | Reference |
|---|---|---|
| Dan Bakkedahl | Correspondent on Comedy Central's The Daily Show | |
| Jackie Bange | Anchor and reporter for CW affiliate and cable superstation WGN-TV in Chicago, Illinois | |
| Shannon Bream | Correspondent on the Fox News Channel, covers the U.S. Supreme Court; Miss Virginia in 1990; participated in the Miss America 1991 pageant; her scholarship award covered much of her education; Miss Florida USA in 1995 | |
| Max Bretos | Current sports anchor for ESPN | |
| Diem Brown | Entertainment reporter for Sky Living and a recurring cast member on MTV's reality television series The Challenge | |
| Lee Corso | Sports broadcaster for ESPN, starred on College GameDay since its inception, former head coach of Louisville and Indiana University | |
| Donna Deegan | Former weekday anchor for WTLV/WJXX | |
| Arnold Díaz | Correspondent on WNYW-TV in New York City | |
| Jamie Dukes | Sports broadcaster for ESPN and host of Put Up Your Dukes | |
| Dave Neal | Sportscaster for ESPN | |
| Gary Parris | Commentator for the University of Central Florida | |
| Stephen Parry | Commentator for the BBC Sport | |
| Eduardo Pérez | Commentator for ESPN's Baseball Tonight | |
| Cecile Reynaud | Commentator for Fox Sports Net, the Sunshine Network, and ESPN | |
| Chris Rix | Current football analyst for ABC and Fox Sports Radio | |
| Spencer Ross | Former sports broadcaster | |
| Danyelle Sargent | Current anchor for ESPN | |
| Gayle Sierens | Current news anchor, WFLA-TV, Tampa | |
| Bailey White | Current commentator for the NPR program All Things Considered | |
| Matt Yocum | NASCAR reporter and sportscaster | |

== Literature, writing, and translation ==
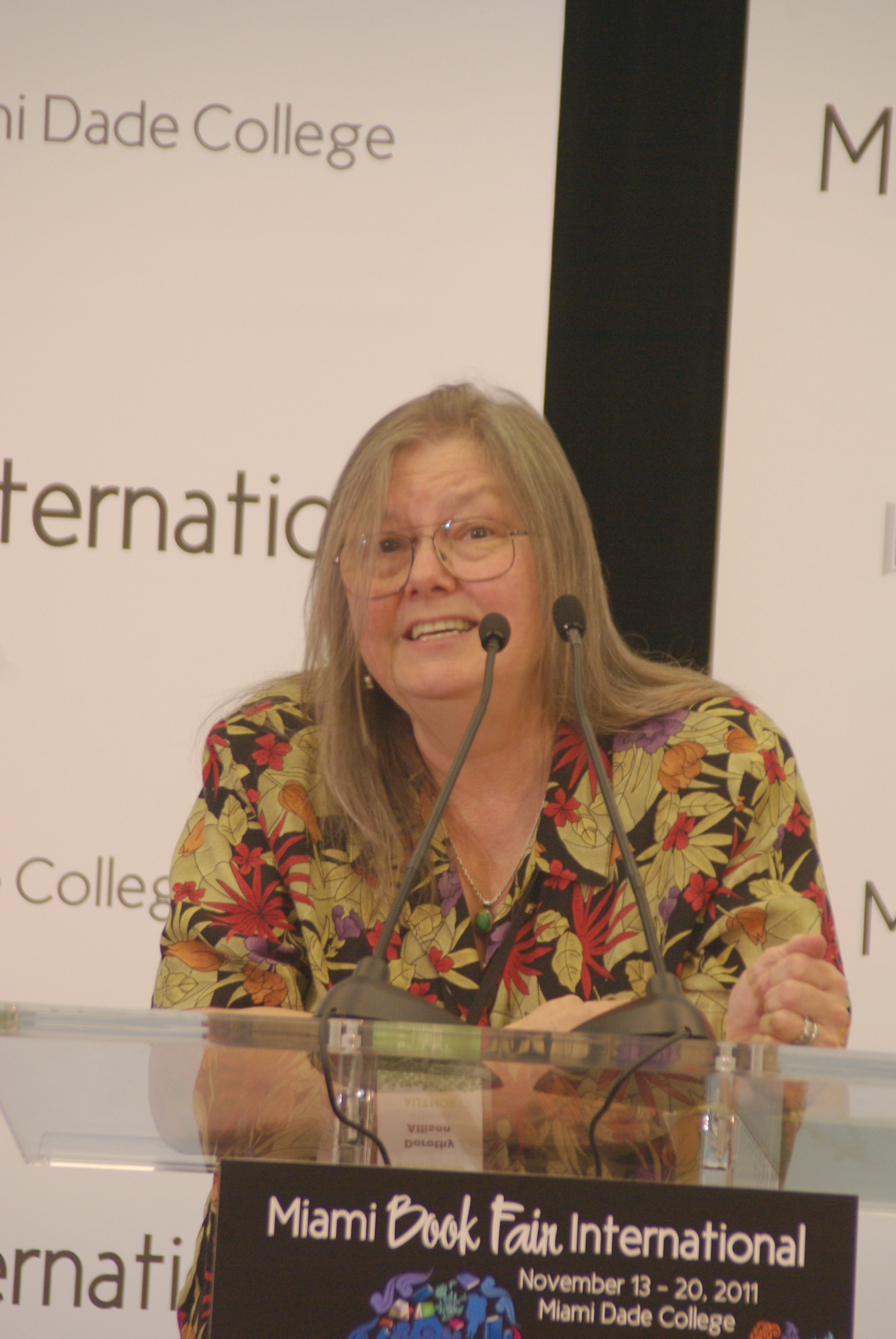
Dorothy Allison

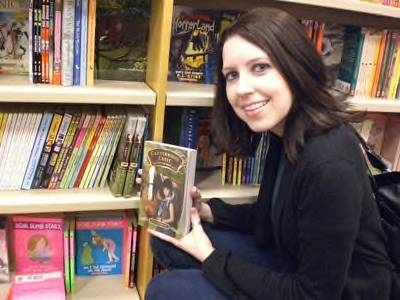
Jessica Burkhart

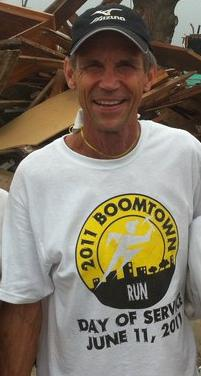
Jeff Galloway

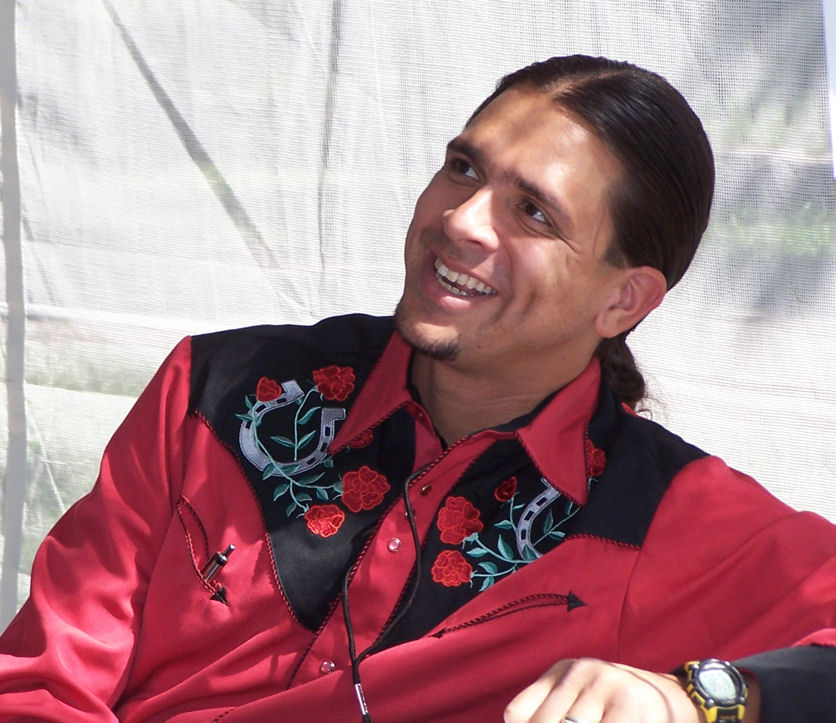
Stephen Jones

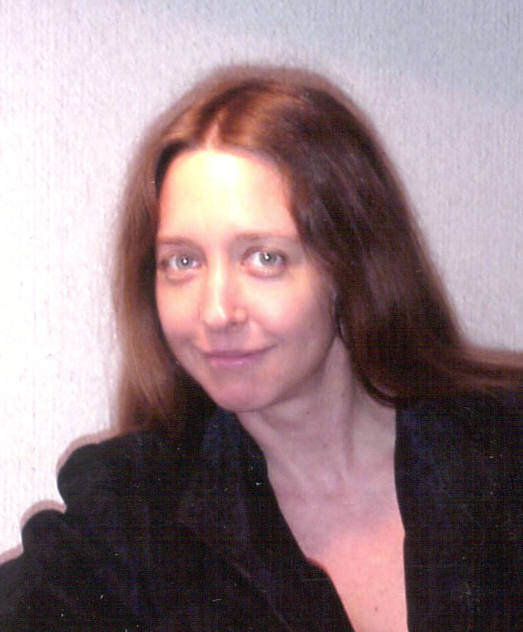
Fiona Kelleghan

| Alumni | Notability | Reference |
|---|---|---|
| Dorothy Allison | Writer | |
| Jason Altmire | Political author and columnist | |
| Doug Bandow | Political writer and former columnist and fellow for the Cato Institute | |
| John Bensko | Poet | |
| Michael Berenbaum | Writer and former professor of Theology | |
| Matt Bondurant | Writer, The Wettest County in the World | |
| Anthony J. Bryant | Author and editor | |
| Christopher Buehlman | Playwright, poet and comedian | |
| Lela E. Buis | Author, poet and playwright | |
| Jesse Bullington | Author, Enterprise of Death, Sad Tale of the Brothers Grossbart | |
| Jessica Burkhart | Author, Canterwood Crest | |
| Brigitte Byrd | French-born poet and author | |
| Virginia Spencer Carr | Biographer, professor at Columbia State University and Georgia State University | |
| Sandra M. Castillo | Poet | |
| John Crawford | Author of the Iraq War memoir The Last True Story I'll Ever Tell | |
| Thomas A. Desjardin | Historian and author | |
| Jeff Galloway | Author and Olympian | |
| Charles Ghigna | Children's author and poet | |
| Juan Gutiérrez | Colombian author | |
| John Earl Haynes | American historian who worked as a specialist in 20th-century political history in the Manuscript Division of the Library of Congress | |
| Rebecca Hazelton | Poet, editor, and critic | |
| Skip Horack | Writer and professor; former Stegner Fellow and Jones Lecturer at Stanford University; assistant professor at Florida State University | |
| Aiden James | Author and fiction writer | |
| Stephen Graham Jones | Author of experimental fiction, horror fiction, crime fiction, and science fiction | |
| Fiona Kelleghan | Science fiction scholar and critic; associate professor at University of Miami | |
| Jesse Lee Kercheval | Academic, poet, memoirist, translator and fiction writer; professor at University of Wisconsin–Madison; author of numerous books, notably Building Fiction, The Museum of Happiness, and The Dogeater | |
| David Kirby | Guggenheim Fellowship (English) | |
| Arthur Kurzweil | Author, educator, editor, writer, and publisher | |
| Sharon Lechter | Author, Rich Dad Poor Dad | |
| D. S. Lliteras | Author | |
| Jean Lorrah | Science fiction novelist and contributor to Star Trek series | |
| Richard Lukas | Author and historian | |
| Brooke Magnanti | Research scientist, blogger and writer who goes by the pen name Belle de Jour | |
| Charles Martin | Author | |
| Jenna McCarthy | Author | |
| Jen McClanaghan | Poet | |
| Janisse Ray | Writer, naturalist, and environmental activist | |
| Emilie Richards | Author of romance and mystery novels | |
| Jordan S. Rubin | Novelist | |
| Gwyn Hyman Rubio | Novelist | |
| Jeff Shaara | Novelist | |
| Linnea Sinclair | Writer of science fiction romance, fantasy romance and paranormal romance | |
| Art Smith | Chef and author | |
| Jane Springer | Poet | |
| Leon Stokesbury | Poet | |
| Hunter S. Thompson | Author and journalist | |
| Ryan Van Cleave | Writer, creative writing instructor | |
| Ann VanderMeer | Editor of Weird Tales magazine and several anthologies of fantasy and sci-fi literature; wife of author Jeff VanderMeer | |

=== Pulitzer Prize winners ===
The Pulitzer Prize is an American award regarded as the highest national honor in print journalism, literary achievements, and musical compositions.

| Alumni | Notability | Reference |
|---|---|---|
| Robert Olen Butler | Won the Pulitzer Prize for Fiction for A Good Scent from a Strange Mountain; Krafft Distinguished Professor holding the Michael Shaara Chair in Creative Writing at FSU | |
| Adam Johnson | Pulitzer Prize–winning novelist and short story writer, The Orphan Master's Son | |
| Doug Marlette | Cartoonist who won the Pulitzer Prize; novelist who wrote The Bridge and Magic Time; former professor at University of North Carolina at Chapel Hill | |
| Kathleen Parker | Pulitzer Prize–winning newspaper columnist, The Washington Post | |
| Ellen Taaffe Zwilich | Composer; first woman to win the Pulitzer Prize for Music | |

== Military ==
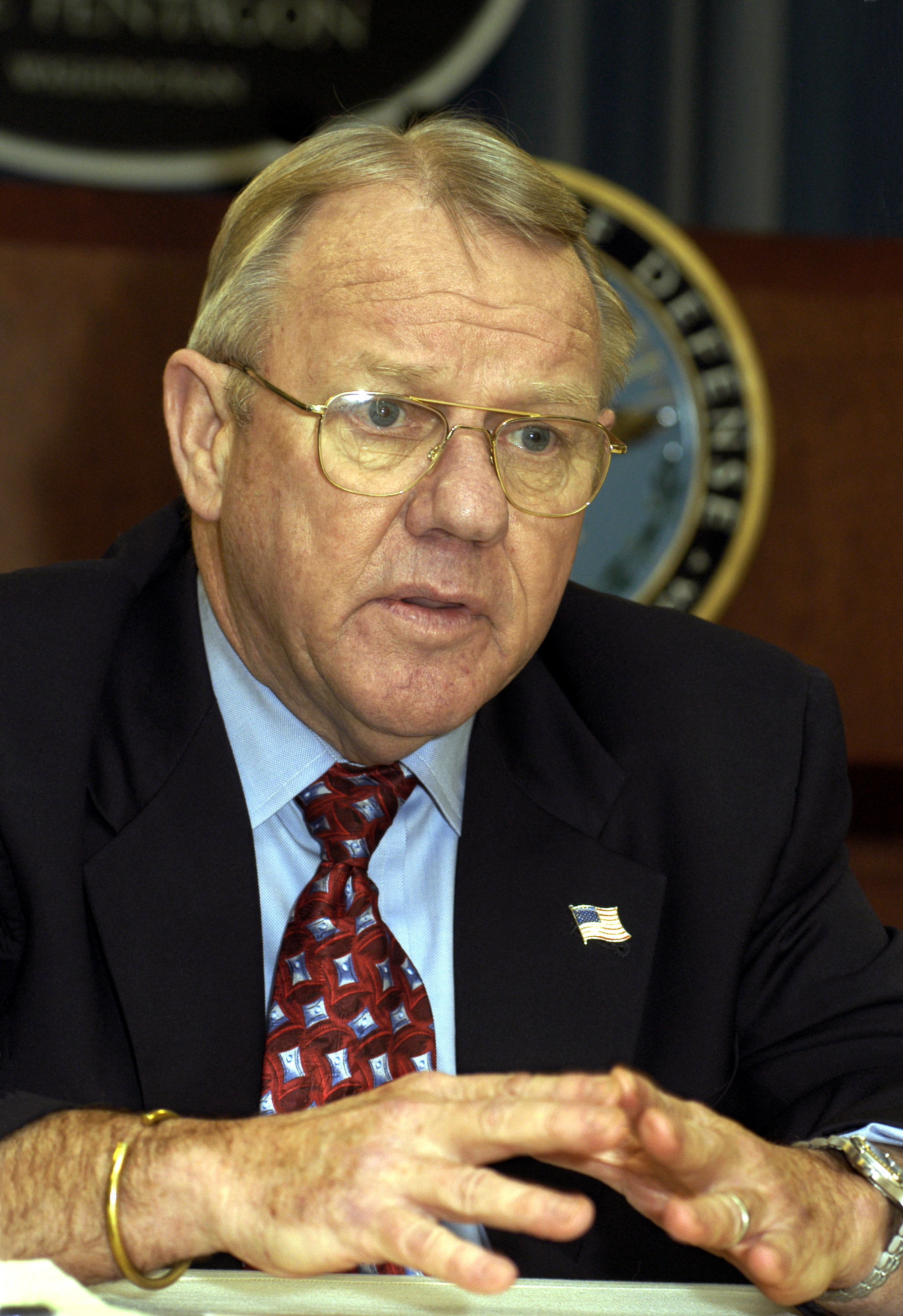
General Garner

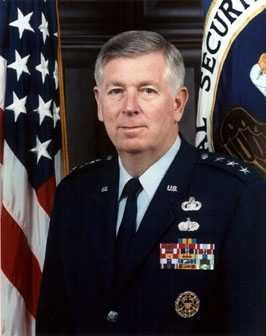
General Minihan

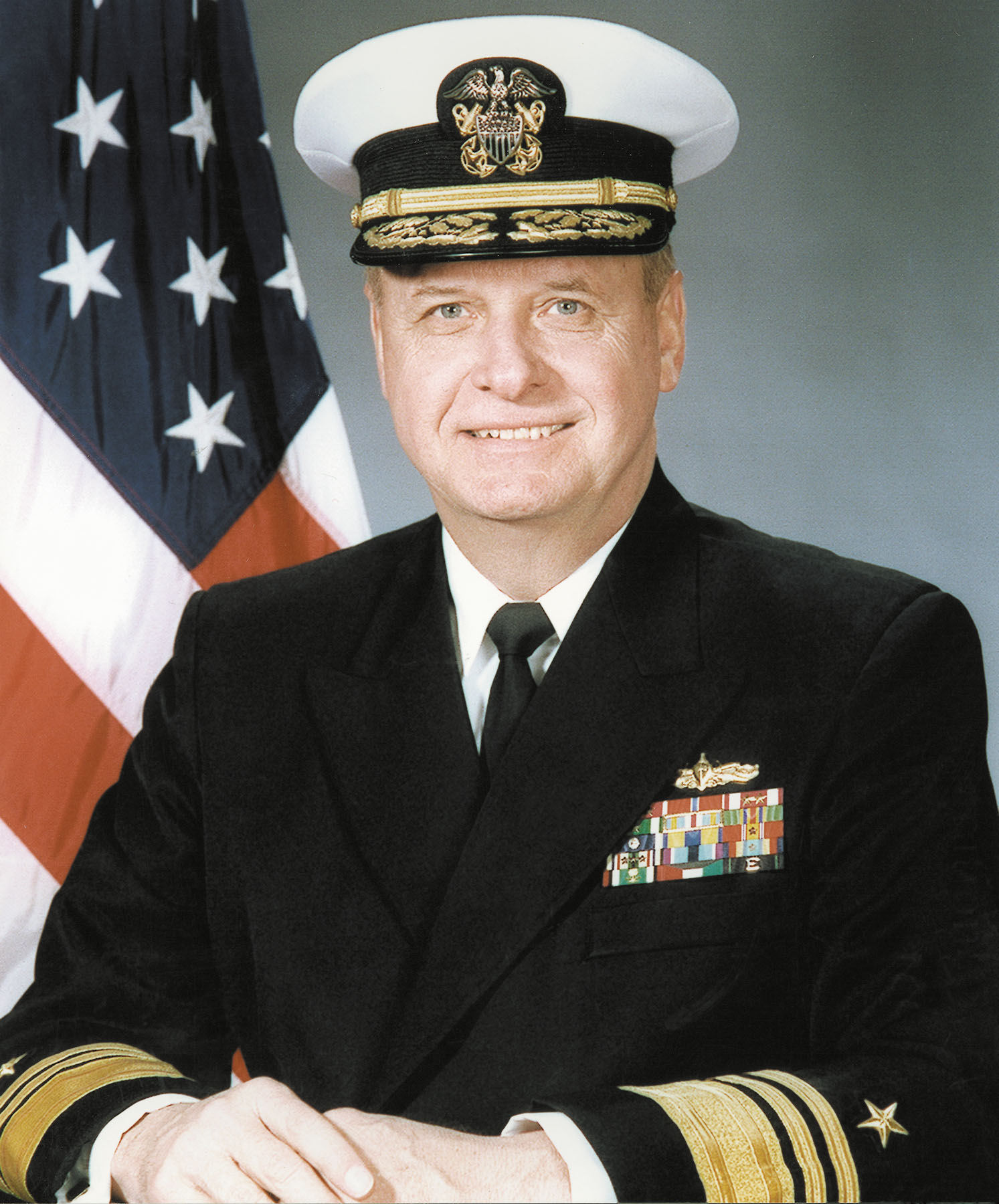
Gordon Holder

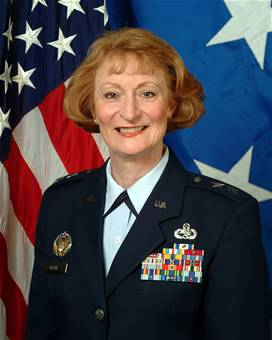
General Peyer

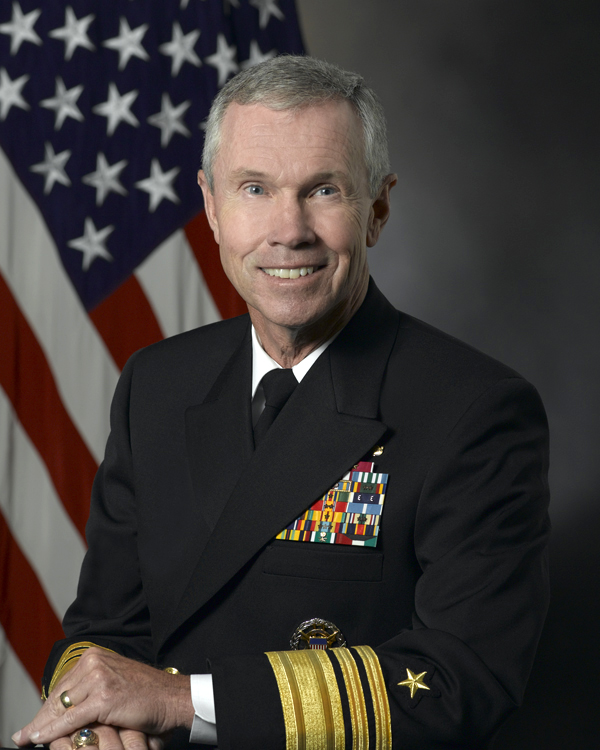
Admiral Sullivan

| Alumni | Notability | Reference |
|---|---|---|
| Norma Elaine Brown | Retired major general in the U.S. Air Force | |
| John Crawford | Former specialist in the U.S. Army National Guard; Iraq War veteran; author of the memoir The Last True Story I'll Ever Tell | |
| Charles J. Cunningham | Retired lieutenant general in the United States Air Force | |
| Jay Garner | Retired general in the U.S. Army; former director of the Office for Reconstruction and Humanitarian Assistance for Iraq | |
| William H. Ginn Jr. | Retired lieutenant general in the U.S. Air Force | |
| Franklin L. Hagenbeck | Active lieutenant general in the U.S. Army and the current commandant of the U.S. Military Academy | |
| Mark R. Hamilton | Retired major general in the U.S. Army | |
| Winfield S. Harpe | Retired major general in the U.S. Air Force | |
| Richard S. Heyser | Pilot during the Cuban Missile Crisis; retired lieutenant colonel in the U.S. Air Force | |
| Gordon S. Holder | Retired vice admiral in the U.S. Navy | |
| J. Adrian Jackson | Retired rear admiral and naval aviator in the U.S. Navy | |
| Paul David Miller | Retired admiral and surface warfare officer in the U.S. Navy; current chairman of the Alliant Techsystems company | |
| Kenneth Minihan | Retired lieutenant general in the U.S. Air Force; former director of the National Security Agency (NSA) | |
| Polly A. Peyer | Retired major general in the U.S. Air Force | |
| John L. Piotrowski | Retired general in the U.S. Air Force | |
| Steven H. Ratti | Active rear admiral in the U.S. Coast Guard | |
| Michael K. Sheridan | Retired brigadier general in the U.S. Marine Corps | |
| Scott Speicher | Captain in the U.S. Navy pilot, who was shot down in the Persian Gulf War | |
| Paul E. Stein | Retired lieutenant general in the U.S. Air Force | |
| Lawrence W. Steinkraus | Retired major general in the U.S. Air Force | |
| William D. Sullivan | Active vice admiral in the U.S. Navy | |
| LeRoy W. Svendsen, Jr. | Retired major general in the U.S. Air Force | |
| H. Marshal Ward | Retired major general in the U.S. Air Force | |
| W. Thomas West | Retired major general in the U.S. Air Force | |

== Music ==
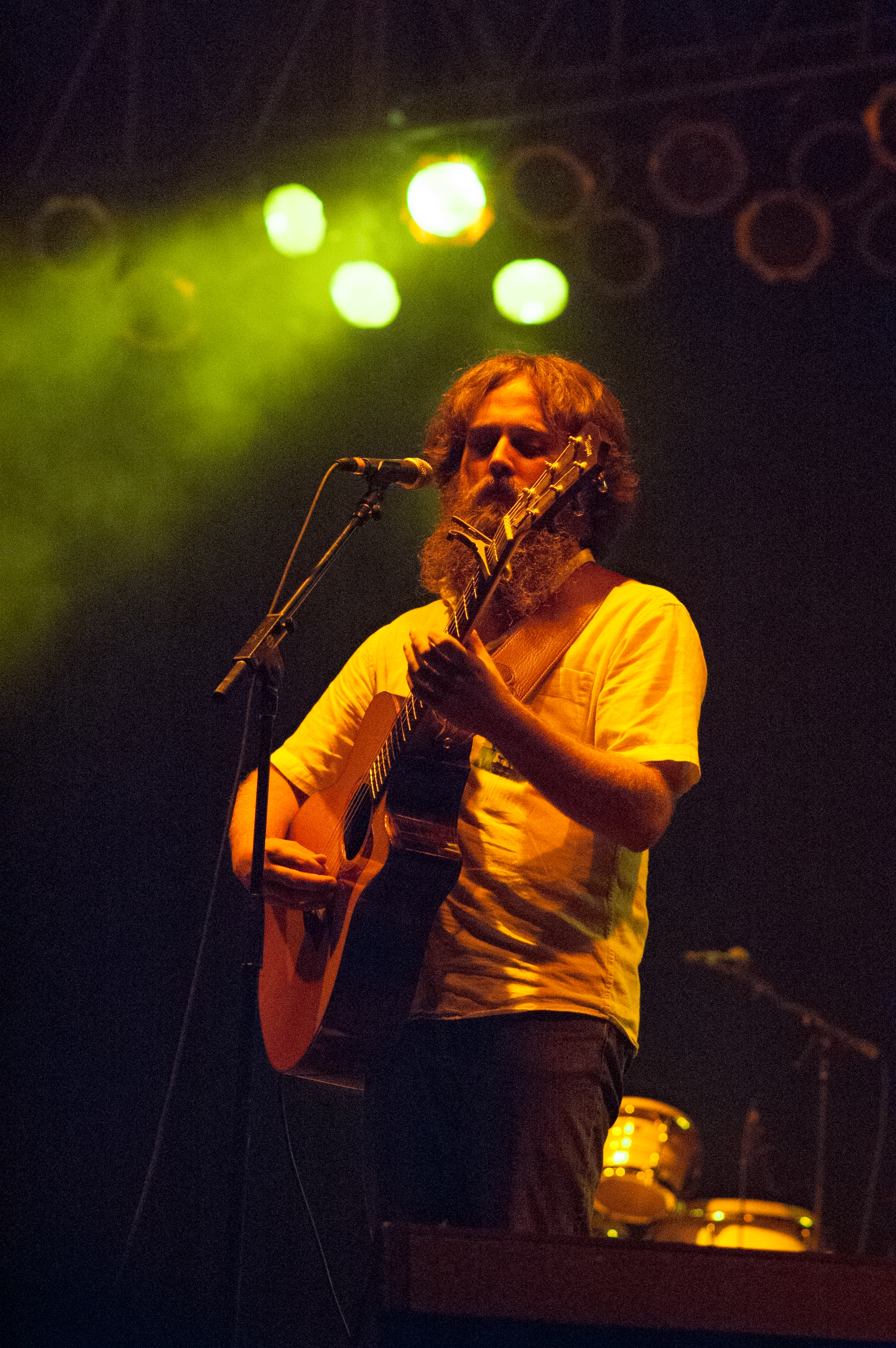
Sam Beam

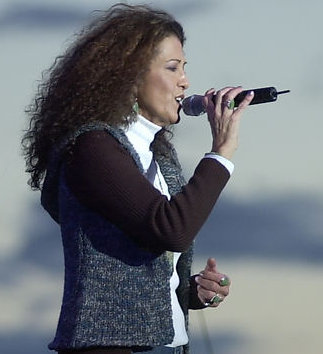
Rita Coolidge

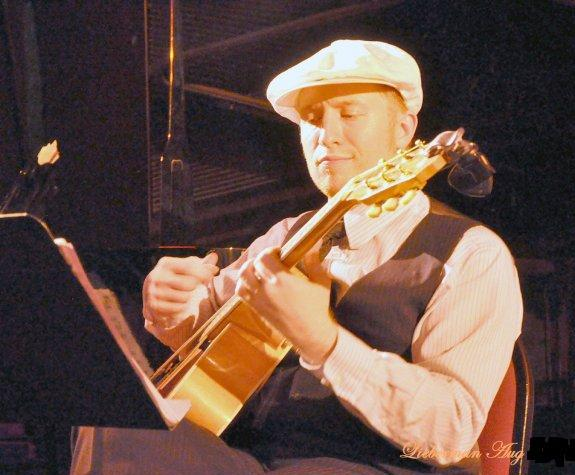
Glenn Crytzer

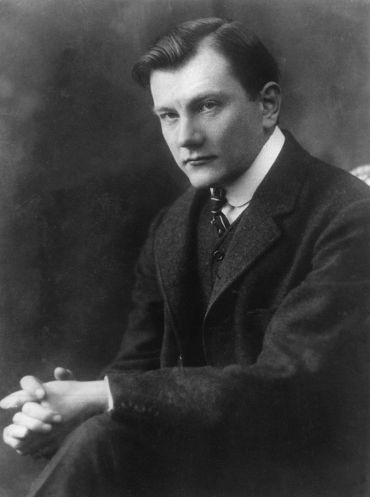
Ernő Dohnányi

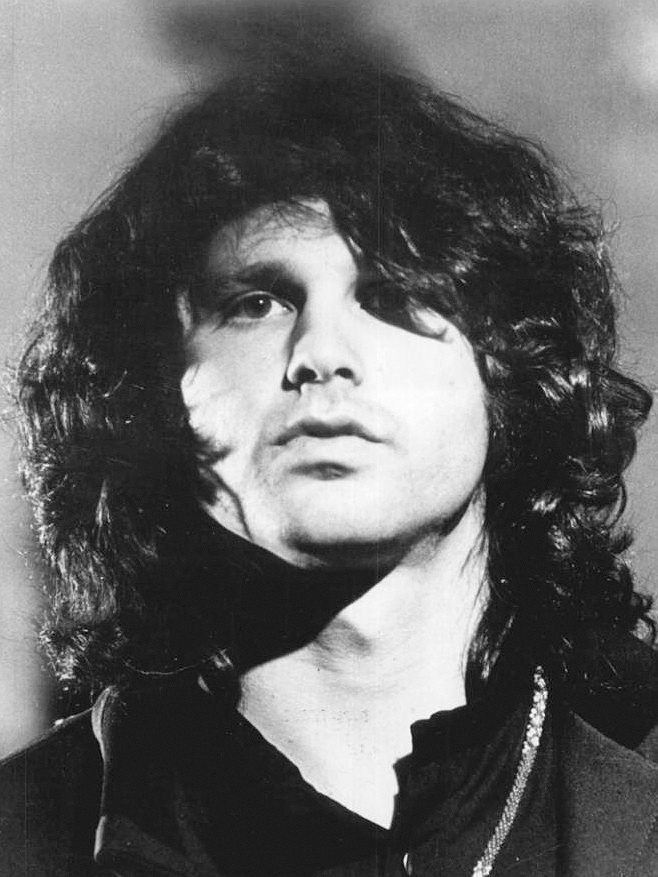
Jim Morrison

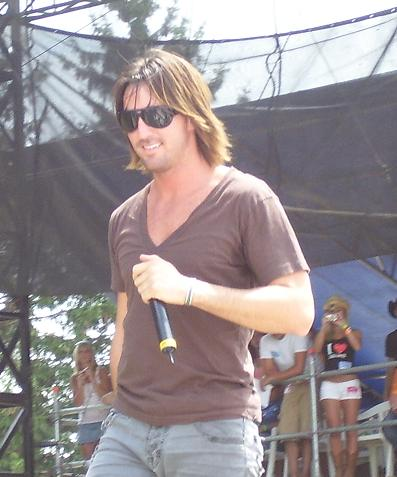
Jake Owen

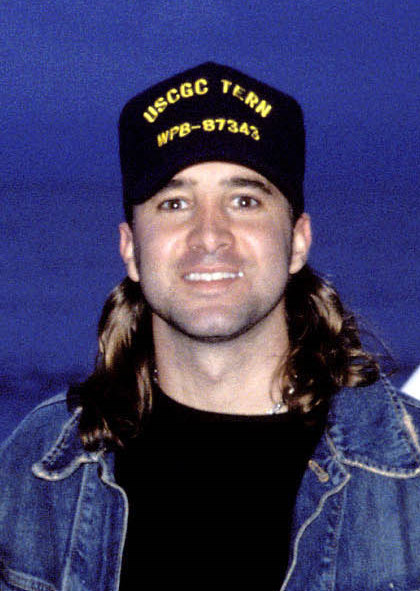
Scott Stapp

| Alumni | Notability | Reference |
|---|---|---|
| Cristian Amigo | Chilean composer, improviser, guitarist, and ethnomusicologist | |
| Kim Barlow | Canadian folk music singer-songwriter | |
| Sam Beam | Sole member of Iron & Wine | |
| Ryland Blackinton | Guitarist for the band Cobra Starship | |
| Brenda Boozer | Mezzo-soprano who had an active career performing in operas and concerts around the world; member of the Metropolitan Opera in New York City for 11 seasons | |
| Ricardo Cobo | Colombian guitar player | |
| Rita Coolidge | Grammy Award-winning singer | |
| Frank Cooper | Pianist, conductor, founder of the Festival of Neglected Romantic Music, research professor of music at University of Miami | |
| Glenn Crytzer | Composer, guitarist, banjoist, and singer | |
| Dimitri Diatchenko | Actor and musician | |
| Jonny Diaz | Contemporary Christian artist | |
| Luis Fonsi | Singer and songwriter | |
| Thomas G. Glenn | Canadian opera singer | |
| Marvin Goldstein | Professional pianist and performer | |
| John Driskell Hopkins | Member of the Zac Brown Band | |
| Sarah Hutchings | Composer | |
| Brian Kelley | Country singer, Florida Georgia Line | |
| Frank Kelley | Tenor and faculty member at Boston University | |
| Ryan Key | Vocals and guitar player for the band Yellowcard | |
| Peter Kurau | Principal horn of the Rochester Philharmonic Orchestra; professor at the Eastman School of Music | |
| Justin Long | Guitar player for No Address | |
| Sean Mackin | Vocals and violin player for the band Yellowcard | |
| Martha Mier | Composer, "Seventh Street Blues" and "Jackson Street Blues" | |
| Stephen Montague | Composer, conductor and recording artist living in London | |
| David Morris | Vocalist for Cold Water Army | |
| Jim Morrison | Singer and songwriter for The Doors | |
| Needlz | Record producer, engineer and composer | |
| Jake Owen | Country singer | |
| Rosephanye Powell | Choral composer, singer, professor, and researcher | |
| R.LUM.R | Alternative R&B artist and classical guitarist | |
| Daniell Revenaugh | Composer and pianist | |
| Marcus Roberts | Jazz pianist | |
| Alex Sadkin | Record producer and saxophonist | |
| Leonard Skinner | High school gym teacher, basketball coach, and businessman; namesake of the Southern rock band Lynyrd Skynyrd | |
| Morgan Sorne | Singer-songwriter and multi-media artist | |
| Tori Sparks | Singer and songwriter | |
| Ryan Speedo Green | Bass-baritone opera singer; graduated with a master's in Music in 2010 and did his first foreign language opera at FSU | |
| Scott Stapp | Singer for the band Creed | |
| William Takacs | Principal trumpet for the Amarillo Symphony Orchestra; professor at West Texas A&M University | |
| Mark Tremonti | Guitarist for the bands Creed and Alter Bridge | |
| Butch Trucks | Drummer, The Allman Brothers Band | |
| Charles Turner | Jazz trumpeter | |
| Will Turpin | Bassist for Collective Soul | |
| Nancy Van de Vate | Composer | |
| Balint Vazsonyi | Hungarian pianist | |
| T. Edward Vives | Trombonist and composer | |
| Ernst von Dohnányi | Composer and conductor of classical music | |
| David Ward-Steinman | Composer for the Chicago Symphony Orchestra | |
| Stella Zambalis | Spinto soprano | |
| Richard Zarou | Contemporary composer of concert and film music | |

== Pageantry ==
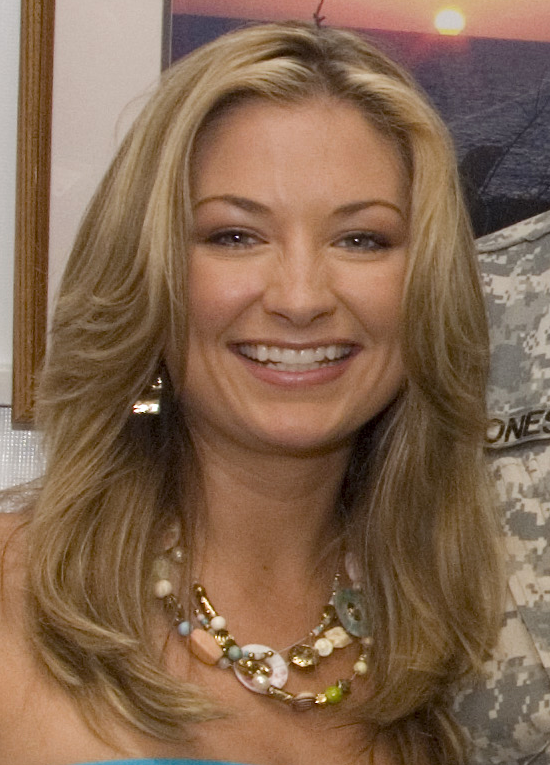
Kylie Williams

| Alumni | Notability | Reference |
|---|---|---|
| Shannon Bream | Miss Virginia 1990, Miss Florida USA 1995 | |
| Valorie Burton | Miss Black Texas USA | |
| Tara Dawn Holland Christensen | Miss America 1997, Miss Kansas 1996, and National Sweetheart 1995 | |
| Tiffany Fallon | Miss Georgia USA 2001 | |
| Lea Mack | Miss Ohio 1994, and motivational speaker | |
| Shauna Pender | Miss Florida 2003 | |
| Toni-Ann Singh | Miss World 2019 | |
| Kylie Williams | Miss Florida 2007 | |

== Social reform ==
| Alumni | Notability | Reference |
|---|---|---|
| Leslie Cochran | Peace activist, cross-dresser, urban outdoorsman and outspoken critic of police treatment of the homeless; known in Austin as Leslie; considered the man who personified "Keep Austin Weird" | |
| Benjamin Crump | Attorney who specializes in civil rights, including those of Trayvon Martin, Michael Brown, George Floyd, Keenan Anderson, Randy Cox, and Tyre Nichols, people affected by the Flint water crisis, the estate of Henrietta Lacks, and the plaintiffs behind the 2019 Johnson & Johnson baby powder lawsuit | |
| Ricardo Dominguez | Artist, activist, and associate professor of visual arts at UC San Diego; subject of controversy over a number of acts of electronic civil disobedience on his own and with the Electronic Disturbance Theater, which he founded | |

== Sports ==
=== Baseball ===
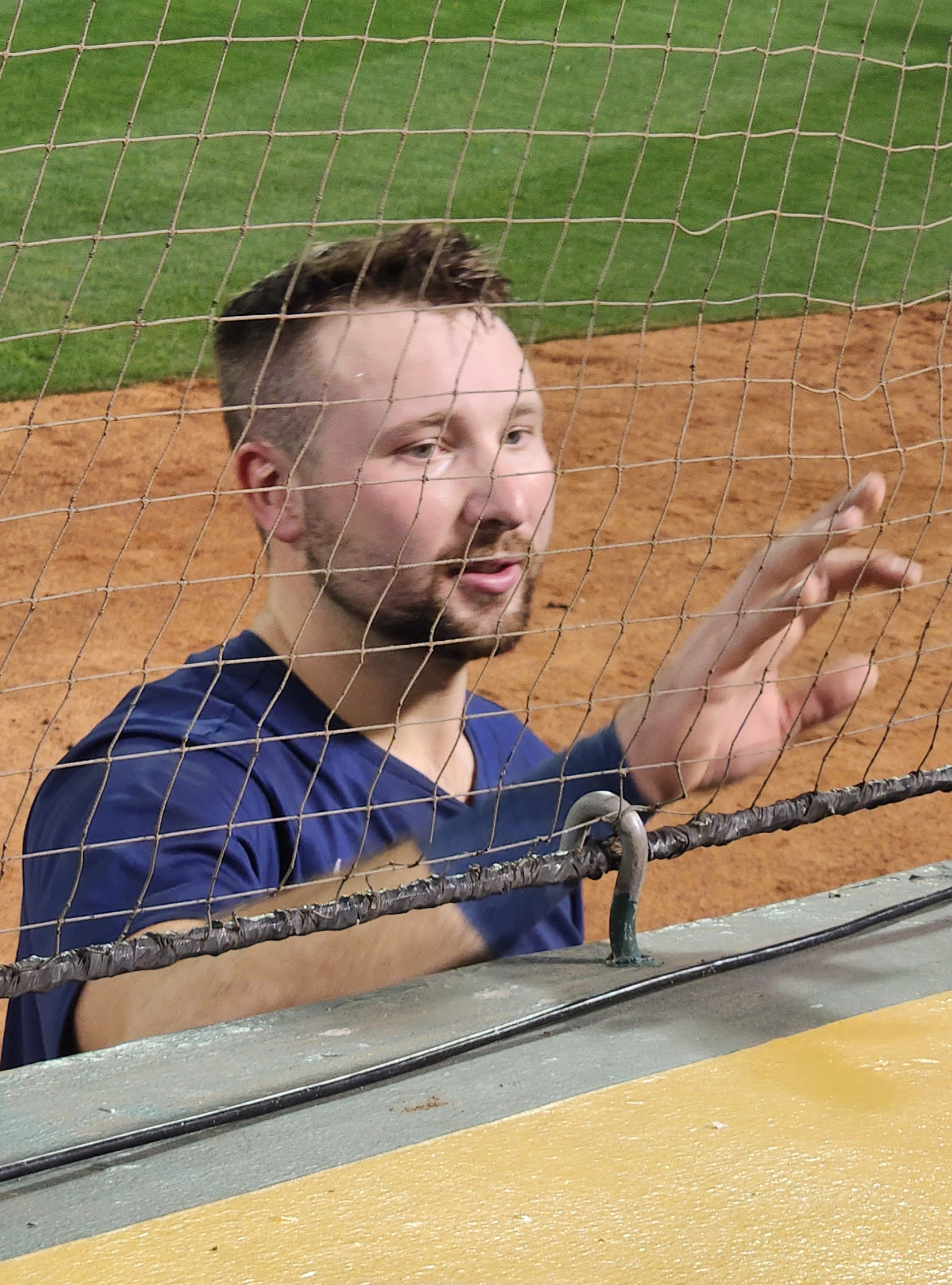
Cal Raleigh

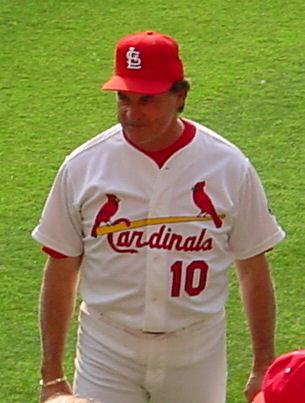
Tony La Russa

| Alumni | Notability | Reference |
|---|---|---|
| Ron Fraser | Former baseball coach for the University of Miami | |
| Dick Howser | Former baseball coach for the Kansas City Royals, New York Yankees, and Florida State University | |
| Terry Kennedy | Former baseball coach for the Iowa Cubs | |
| Tony La Russa | Former baseball manager for the Chicago White Sox, Oakland A's, and St. Louis Cardinals | |
| Carlos Lezcano | Current baseball coach for the Lake Elsinore Storm | |
| Mike Martin | Former baseball coach for Florida State University | |
| Buster Posey | Former catcher and current president of baseball operations for the San Francisco Giants | |
| Cal Raleigh | Best catcher in baseball for the Seattle Mariners | |
| Larry Rothschild | Former baseball player for the Detroit Tigers and baseball coach for the Tampa Bay Devil Rays, now pitching coach of the San Diego Padres | |
| Kevin Cash | Former baseball player for [Toronto Bluejays], [Tampa Bay Devil Rays], [Boston Redsox], [New York Yankes], and [Houston Astros]. Current Manager for the [Tampa Bay Devil Rays] since 2015. | |

=== Basketball ===
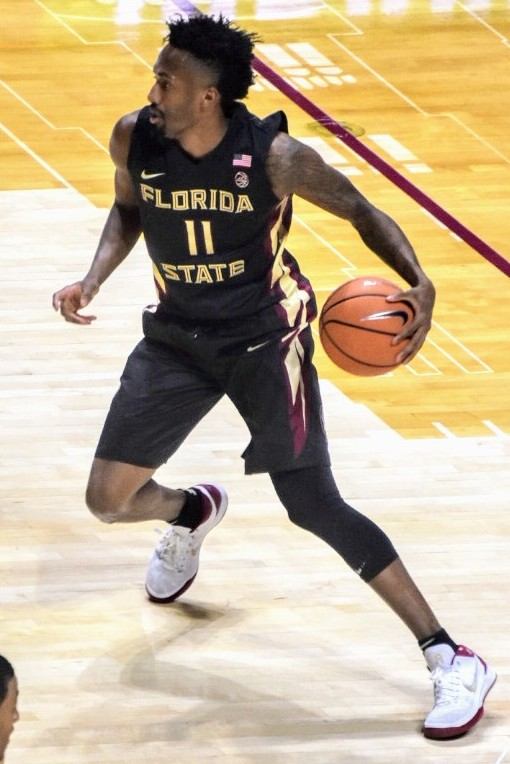
Braian Angola

| Alumni | Notability | Reference |
|---|---|---|
| Braian Angola | Colombian basketball player who plays for Hapoel Tel Aviv of the Israeli Basketball Premier League | |
| Scottie Barnes | NBA Rookie of the Year (2022) | |
| Sam Cassell | Professional basketball coach for the Boston Celtics, former basketball player | |
| Dave Cowens | Former basketball coach for the Charlotte Hornets, Golden State Warriors, Chicago Sky | |
| Hugh Durham | Former basketball coach for the University of Georgia and Florida State University | |
| Cliff Ellis | Former basketball coach for Clemson University and Auburn University | |
| Terance Mann | Professional basketball player for the Los Angeles Clippers | |
| Tom Nissalke | Former basketball coach for the Utah Jazz, Cleveland Cavaliers, and San Antonio Spurs | |
| Isaiah Swann | Professional basketball player | |
| M. J. Walker | Basketball player in the Israeli Basketball Premier League and NBA | |

=== Football ===
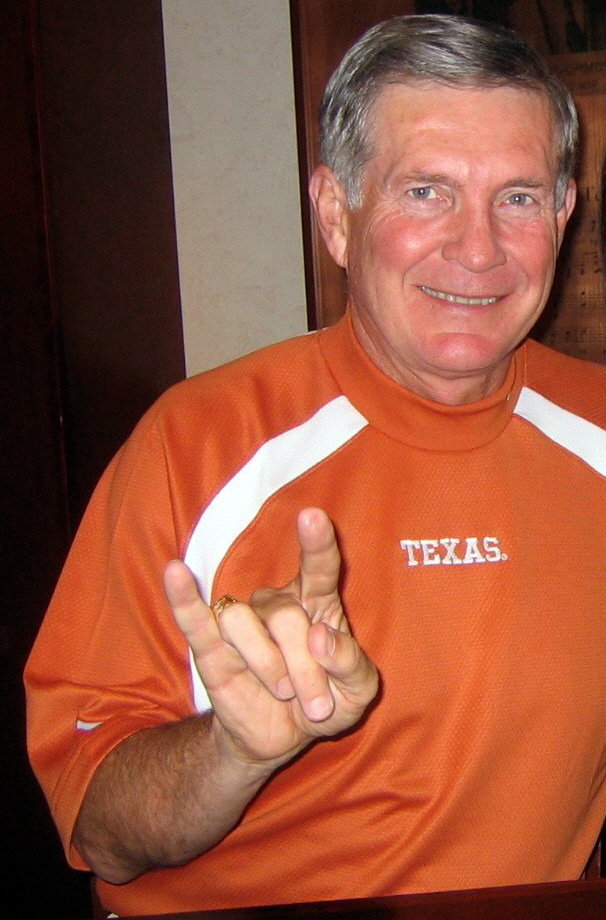
Mack Brown

| Alumni | Notability | Reference |
|---|---|---|
| Joe Avezzano | Football coach of Oregon State University | |
| Mike Bloomgren | Head football coach, Rice University | |
| Terry Bowden | Football coach for Auburn University and the University of Akron | |
| Mack Brown | Football coach for the University of North Carolina at Chapel Hill and the University of Texas at Austin | |
| Lee Corso | Football coach for the University of Louisville and Indiana University | |
| Gene Cox | Football coach of Leon High School and member of the Florida Sports Hall of Fame | |
| William A. Dawson | American football player and assistant coach for Marshall University; nicknamed "Red" for his red hair; portrayed by Matthew Fox in the film We Are Marshall | |
| Manny Diaz | Head football coach for Duke University | |
| Bobby Frazier | Football coach for the University of the District of Columbia and Bethune-Cookman University | |
| Vince Gibson | Football coach for Kansas State University, Tulane University, and University of Louisville | |
| Reggie Herring | Football coach for the University of Arkansas | |
| Niles Nelson | Football coach for Husson University | |
| Jamal Reynolds | Lombardi Award winner, unanimous All-American | |
| Kirby Smart | Football coach for the University of Georgia | |
| Rick Stockstill | Football coach for Middle Tennessee State University | |
| Jim Yarbrough | Football coach for Southeastern Louisiana University | |

=== Other ===
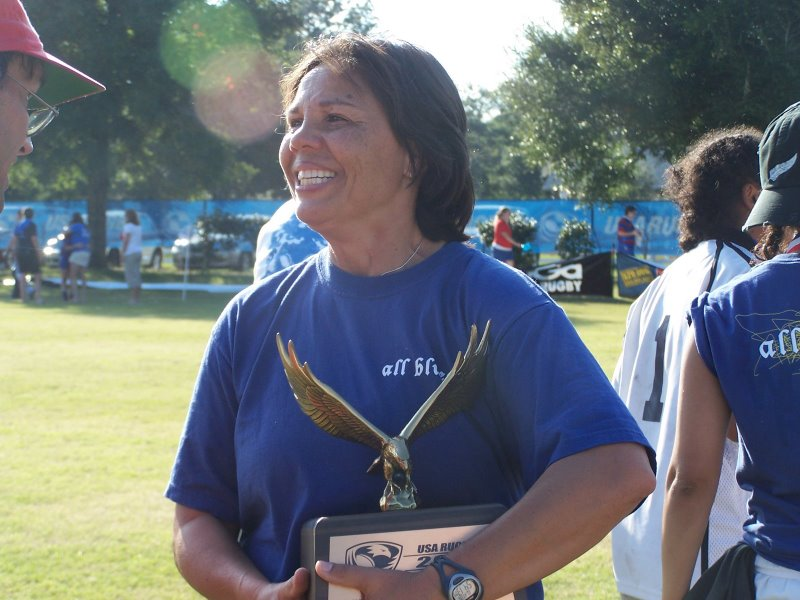
Kathy Flores

| Alumni | Notability | Reference |
|---|---|---|
| Zach Banks | Racing driver | |
| Bob Bowman | Former swimming coach for the University of Michigan, and mentor to Michael Phelps | |
| John Cernuto | Professional poker player | |
| Kathy Flores | Current head coach for the United States women's national rugby union team | |
| Cecile Reynaud | Former volleyball coach for Florida State University, current analyst for ESPN | |

== Notable faculty and staff ==
Jump to Category:Florida State University faculty

=== Florida State University presidents ===
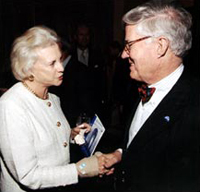
Talbot D'Alemberte

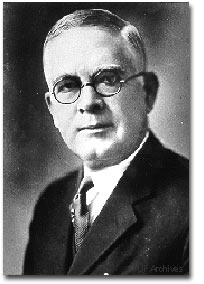
Albert Murphree

| President | Year | Reference |
|---|---|---|
| George Edgar | 1887–1892 | |
| Alvin Lewis | 1892–1897 | |
| Albert A. Murphree | 1897–1909, subsequently president of the University of Florida, 1909–1927 | |
| Edward Conradi | 1909–1947 | |
| Doak S. Campbell | 1947–1957 | |
| Albert B. Martin | 1957 (interim) | |
| Robert M. Strozier | 1957–1960 | |
| Milton W. Carothers | 1960 (interim) | |
| Gordon W. Blackwell | 1960–1965, and president of Furman University, 1965–1976 | |
| John E. Champion | 1965–1969 | |
| J. Stanley Marshall | 1969–1976 | |
| Bernard F. Sliger | 1976–1991 | |
| Dale W. Lick | 1991–1994 | |
| Talbot D'Alemberte | 1994–2003 | |
| T. K. Wetherell | 2003–2009, and former speaker of the Florida House of Representatives | |
| Eric J. Barron | 2009–2014 | |
| Garnett S. Stokes | 2014 (interim) | |
| John E. Thrasher | 2014–2021 | |
| Richard D. McCullough | 2021–present | |

=== Faculty winners of major honors ===
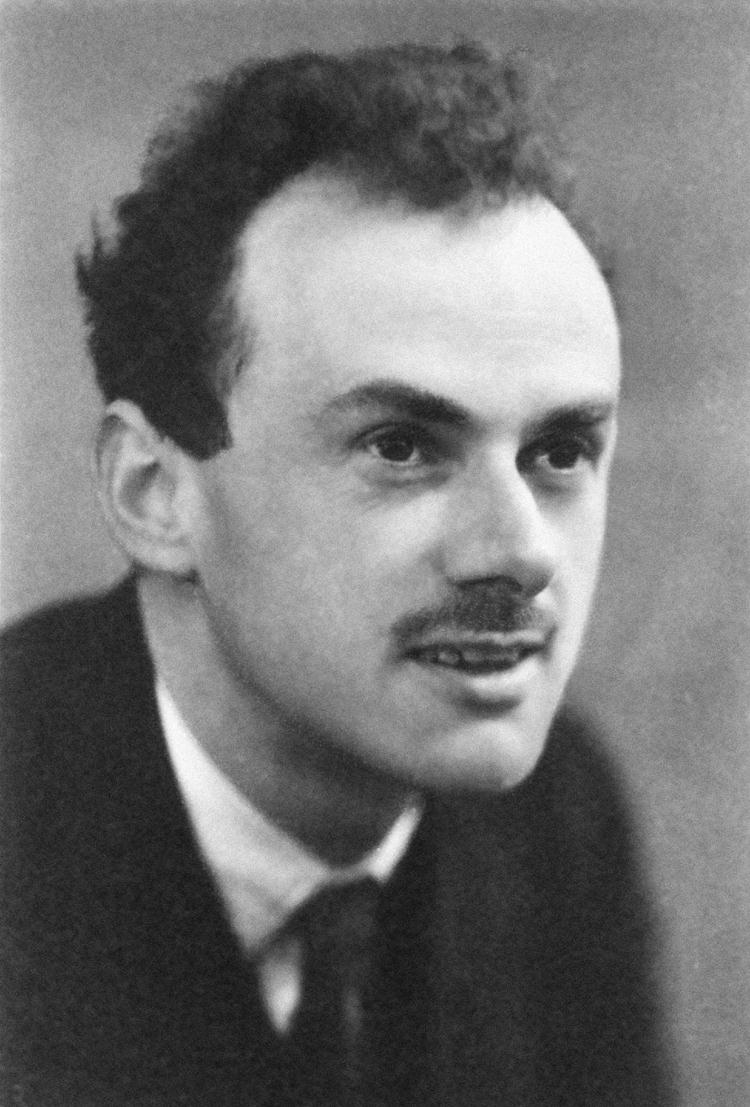
Paul Adrien Maurice Dirac

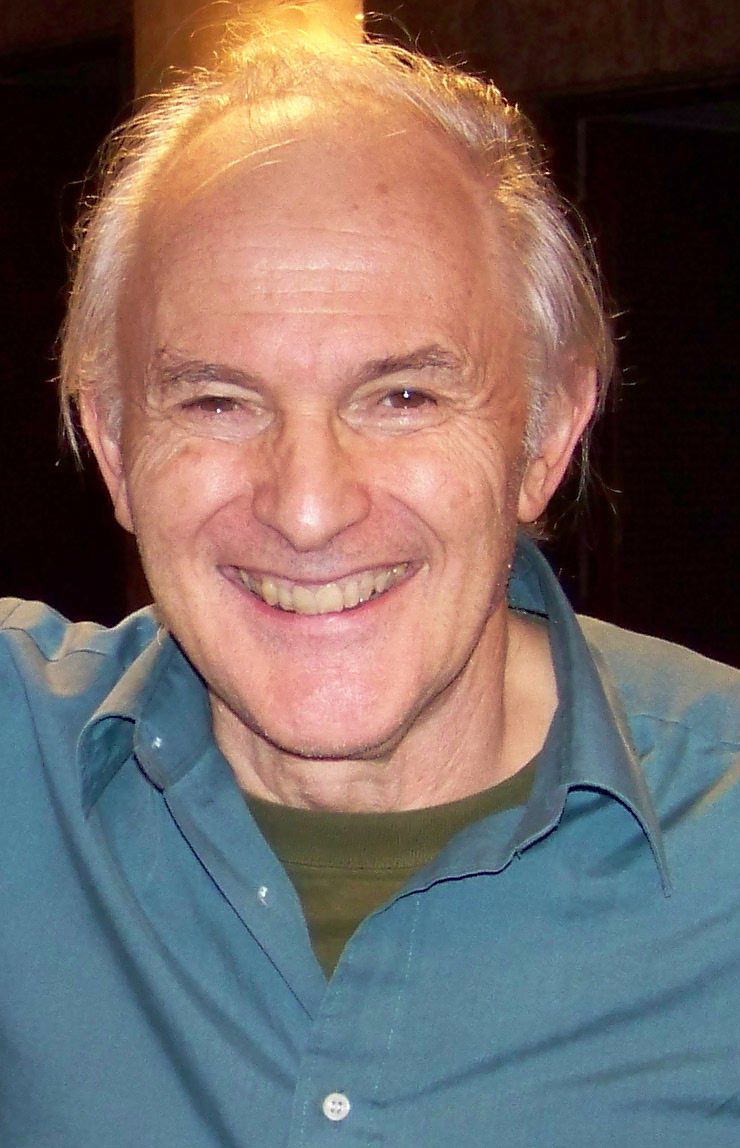
Sir Harold Kroto

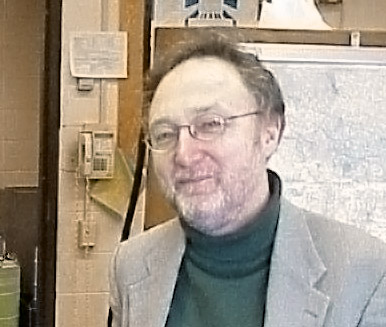
David Larbalestier

Donald Crosby

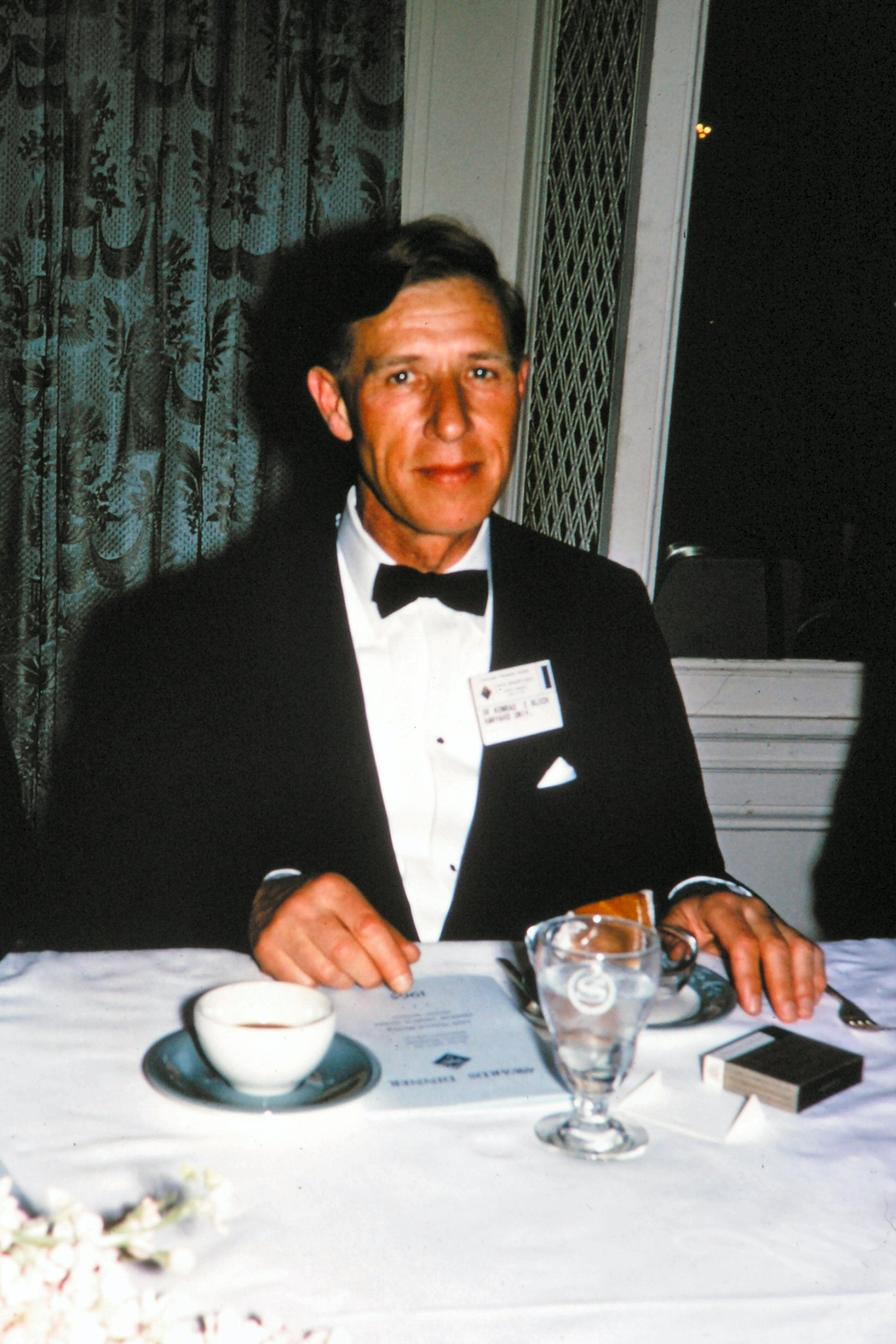
Konrad Bloch

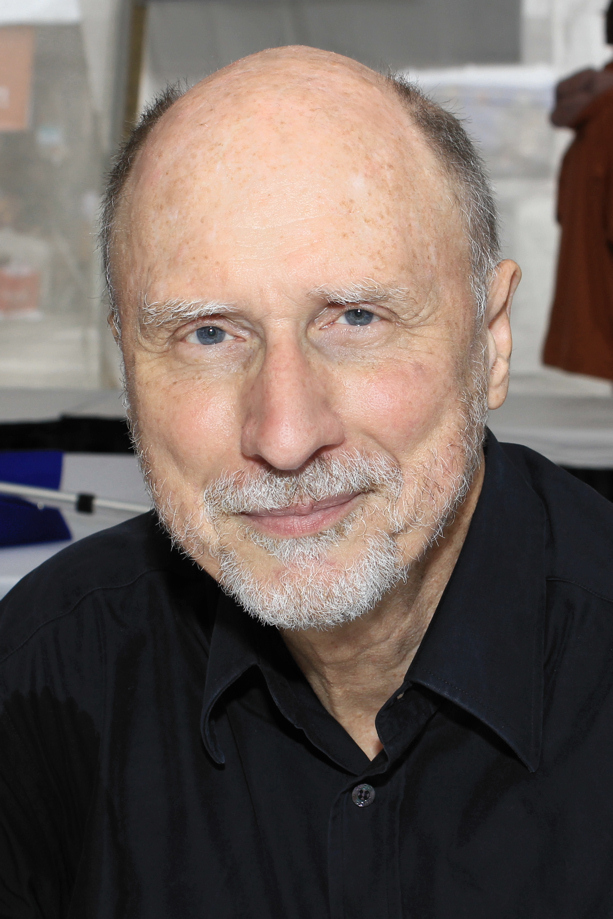
Robert Olen Butler

| Name | Notability | Reference |
|---|---|---|
| Lawrence G. Abele | American Association for the Advancement of Science (Biological Science) | |
| Roy Baumeister | Institute for Scientific Information highly cited researcher (Psychology/Psychiatry) | |
| Konrad E. Bloch | 1964 Nobel Prize in Medicine | |
| James M. Buchanan | 1986 Nobel Prize in Economics | |
| Robert Olen Butler | Pulitzer Prize for Fiction; Guggenheim Fellowship (English) | |
| Donald Caspar | National Academy of Sciences (Biophysics); American Academy of Arts & Sciences (Biochemistry and Molecular Biology); Guggenheim Fellowship (Biological Science) | |
| Donald A. Crosby | Professor Emeritus of Philosophy at Colorado State University | |
| Timothy Cross | American Association for the Advancement of Science (Chemistry) | |
| Naresh Dalal | American Association for the Advancement of Science (Chemistry) | |
| Paul Adrien Maurice Dirac | 1933 Nobel Prize in Physics | |
| Dean Falk | American Association for the Advancement of Science (Anthropology) | |
| Carlisle Floyd | 1956 Guggenheim Fellowship (Music) | |
| Lev Gor'kov | National Academy of Sciences (Physics) | |
| Max Gunzburger | 2008 SIAM W.T. and Idalia Reid Prize in Mathematics | |
| Frances James | American Academy of Arts & Sciences (Evolutionary and Population Biology and Ecology); American Association for the Advancement of Science (Biology) | |
| Thomas Joiner | Guggenheim Fellowship (Psychology) | |
| Michael Kasha | National Academy of Sciences (Chemistry); American Academy of Arts & Sciences (Biochemistry and Molecular Biology); Guggenheim Fellowship (Physical Chemistry) | |
| John Kelsay | Guggenheim Fellowship (Religion) | |
| Sir Harold W. Kroto | 1996 Nobel Prize in Chemistry; National Academy of Sciences (Chemistry); Institute for Scientific Information highly cited researcher (Chemistry) | |
| David Larbalestier | National Academy of Engineering (Superconducting Materials) | |
| Alan Marshall | American Association for the Advancement of Science (Chemistry) | |
| Robert Sanderson Mulliken | 1966 Nobel Prize in Chemistry | |
| Simon Ostrach | National Academy of Engineering (Space Science/Mechanical Engineering); American Academy of Arts & Sciences (Space Science/Mechanical Engineering) | |
| Jill Quadagno | Guggenheim Fellowship (Sociology) | |
| Michael Ruse | Guggenheim Fellowship (Philosophy); American Association for the Advancement of Science (Philosophy) | |
| Shridhar Sathe | Institute for Scientific Information highly cited researcher (Agricultural Sciences) | |
| John Robert Schrieffer | 1972 Nobel Prize Physics | |
| Melvin Stern | National Academy of Sciences (Geophysics); American Academy of Arts & Sciences (Astronomy and Earth Sciences); Guggenheim Fellowship (Oceanography) | |
| Gary Taylor | Guggenheim Fellowship (English) | |
| André J. Thomas | Robert Shaw Choral Award, American Choral Directors Association | |
| R. Jay Turner | Institute for Scientific Information highly cited researcher (Social Sciences) | |
| Sherwood Wise | American Association for the Advancement of Science (Geological Sciences) | |
| Ellen Taaffe Zwilich | Pulitzer Prize for Music; American Academy of Arts & Sciences (Visual and Performing Arts); Guggenheim Fellowship (Music) | |

=== Other notable faculty ===
Abdus Suttar Khan

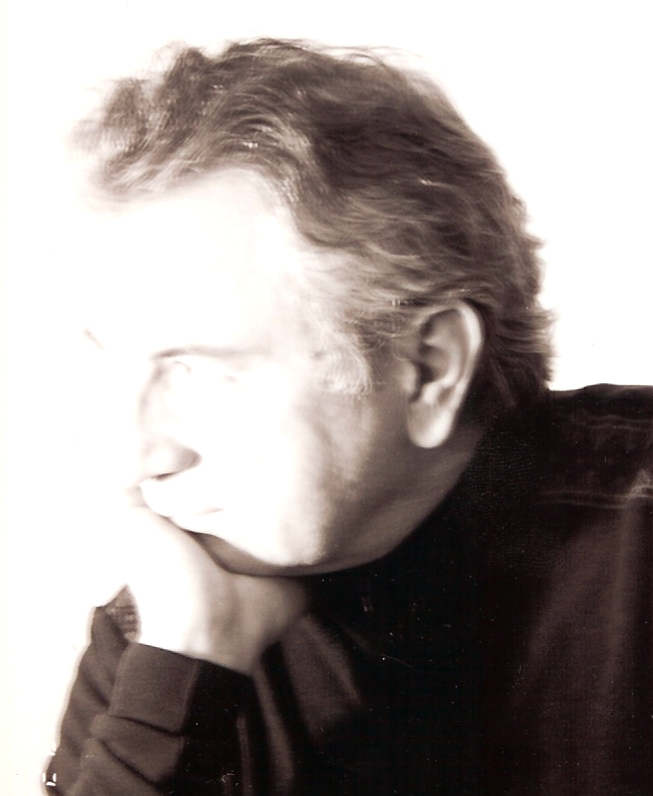
Charles Figley

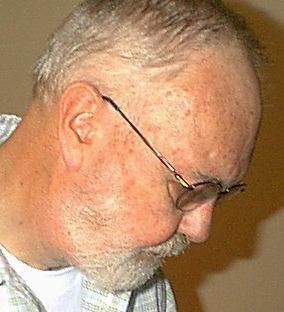
William Heard

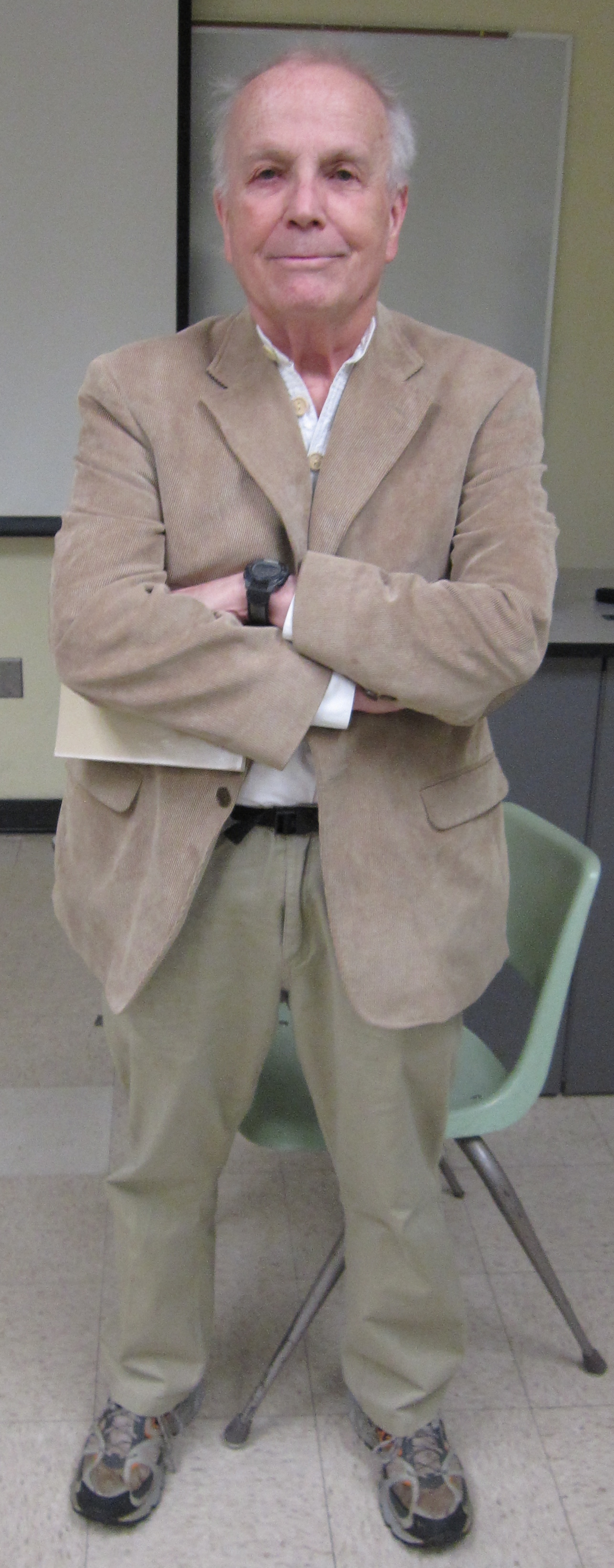
Justin Leiber

| Faculty | Notability | Reference |
|---|---|---|
| Gerald M. Ackerman | Art historian, Appleton Distinguished Professor (1994) | |
| Amy Ai | Fellow of the American Psychological Association's Division 56, and fellow of the Gerontological Society of America | |
| Farrukh S. Alvi | Professor of Mechanical Engineering, Fellow of the American Society of Mechanical Engineers | |
| Carrie Ann Baade | Painter | |
| Susan Blessing | Particle physicist, APS fellow, former chair of the APS Forum on Education | |
| Richard Burgin | Violinist and concertmaster of the Boston Symphony Orchestra | |
| Yvonne Ciannella | Coloratura soprano | |
| Dean Falk | Lead scientist in research team mapping the brain shape of the LB1 Hobbit | |
| Gerald R. Ferris | Scholar of management and psychology | |
| Charles Figley | Traumatologist, American Psychological Association Fellow, and Fulbright Fellow | |
| Zachary Fisk | Condensed matter physicist | |
| Robert Gellately | Historian known for research on Nazi-era Germany and the Cold War | |
| H. Winter Griffith | Physician and author of many popular books on health and medicine | |
| Paul G. Halpern | Historian known for research and documentary publications on the naval history of the First World War | |
| Barbara Hamby | Poet in residence | |
| Janice Harsanyi | Soprano | |
| William H. Heard | Expert on freshwater mollusks | |
| Mary Hicks | Professor Emeritus, 30 years in the Interdivisional Program of Marriage and the Family | |
| Toussaint Hocevar | Economic historian | |
| Randall Holcombe | Co-founder of Buchanan–Holcombe Branch of economists, past president of the Society for Development of Austrian Economics and the Public Choice Society | |
| Robert A. Holton | Inventor of the synthetic process for making taxol | |
| R. Mark Isaac | Scholar of experimental economics | |
| Kelly Jemison | Geologist specializing in Antarctic diatoms | |
| Frederick L. Jenks | 2002 TESOL Heinle & Heinle Excellence in Teaching Award | |
| Abdus Suttar Khan | Chemist and aerospace researcher | |
| Gary Kleck | Criminologist known for empirical work on guns and violence | |
| Vadim Komkov | Mathematician and physicist | |
| T. N. Krishnamurti | Recipient of the Carl Gustav Rossby Medal from the American Meteorological Society and developer of the FSU "Superensemble" hurricane prediction model | |
| Justin Leiber | Philosopher and science fiction writer | |
| Dan Markel | Law professor known for work on criminal justice | |
| Alan G. Marshall | Society for Applied Spectroscopy fellow (2004) | |
| Alfred Mele | Philosopher in practical reason | |
| Doron Nof | Fridtjof Nansen Medal winner | |
| Victor Nuñez | Film director | |
| Ruth Posselt | Classical violinist | |
| Per Arne Rikvold | 2004 foreign member of the Norwegian Academy of Science and Letters | |
| William Hudson Rogers | Professor of English | |
| Michael Ruse | Philosopher of science, known for his work on the relationship between creationism and evolution | |
| Michael Shaara | Writer of science fiction, sports fiction, and historical fiction | |
| Louis Sola | Federal Maritime Commissioner | |
| Friedrich Stephan | Discovered the suprachiasmatic nucleus (circadian "clock") | |
| Stephan von Molnár | 1986 Alexander von Humboldt Senior U.S. Scientist Award | |
| Mark Winegardner | Novelist | |
| Kun Yang | 2003 Outstanding Young Researcher Award of the Overseas Chinese Physics Association | |

== See also ==
- Category:Florida State University alumni
- List of Florida State University faculty
- List of Florida State University athletes
