= Florida State University College of Law =

Public law school in Tallahassee, Florida, US

- Established: 1966; 60 years ago
- School type: Public
- Location: Tallahassee, Florida, U.S.
- Enrollment: 454
- Faculty: 62
- USNWR ranking: 34th (tied) (2026)
- Bar pass rate: 82.97% (Overall 2023 first-time takers); 88.5% (Florida bar exam, July 2025 first-time takers)
- Website: law.fsu.edu
- ABA profile: Standard 509 Report

The Florida State University College of Law is the law school of Florida State University located in Tallahassee, Florida. It is currently tied for the highest ranked law school in Florida and is ranked in the top 40 best law schools in the United States. The College of Law is also ranked as one of the top 20 public law schools in the country and holds the second highest bar passage rate in the state.

The law school borders the southeast quadrant of the University's campus, near the Donald L. Tucker Center, an arena and part of the Tallahassee civic center area. The College of Law campus consists of four major buildings, four historic houses around a green and five parking lots. It occupies two full city blocks and is directly across the street from the Florida Supreme Court and one block from the Florida Legislature. The school's most recent addition is its 50,000-square-foot Advocacy Center, which includes five courtrooms.

According to Florida State University's 2016 ABA-required disclosures, 72.6% of the Class of 2015 obtained full-time, long-term, bar passage required employment (i.e., as attorneys) ten months after graduation. According to those same disclosures, 81.7% of the Class of 2015 obtained full-time, long-term, bar passage required jobs or JD preferred positions within ten months of graduation.

== History ==
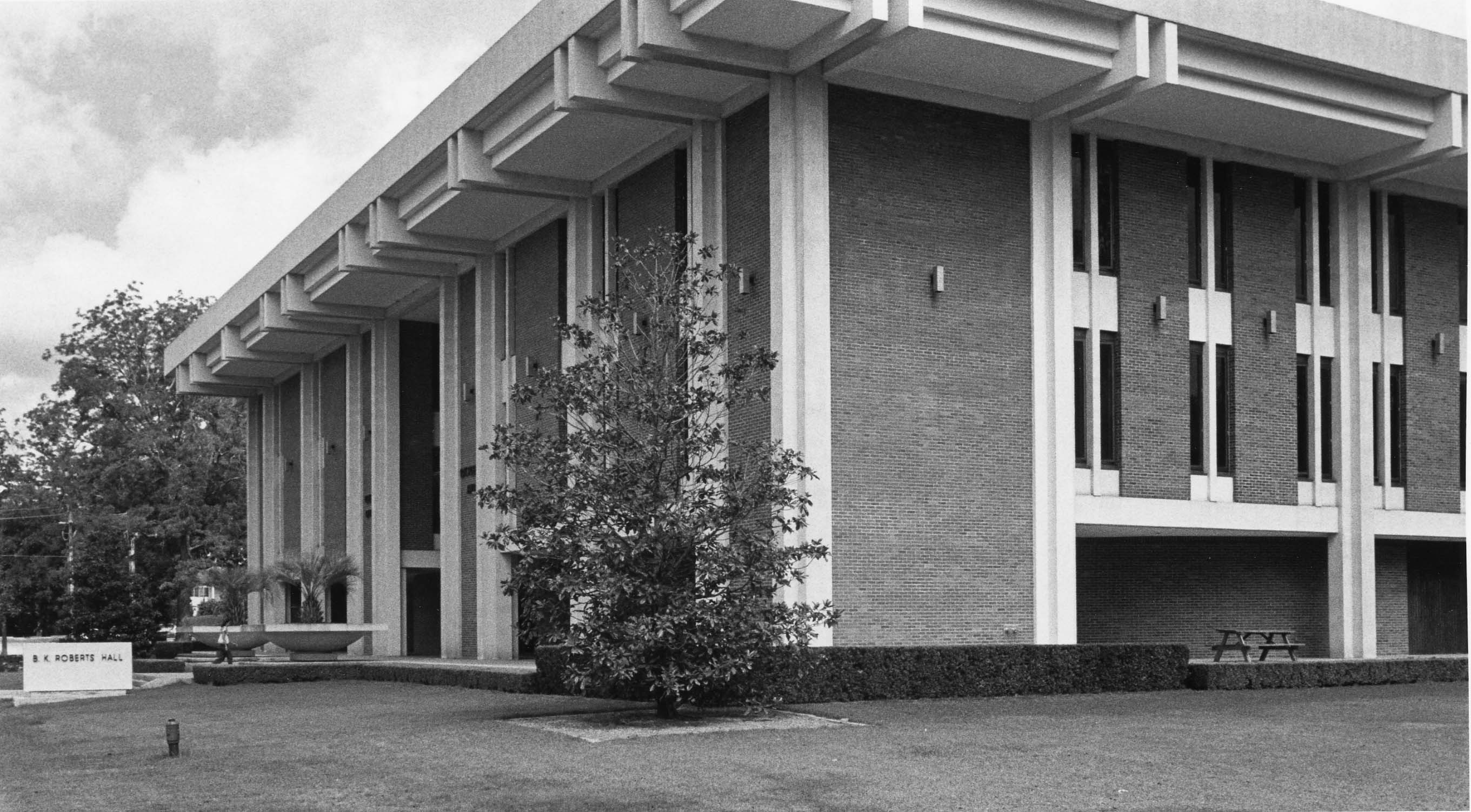
The B.K. Roberts Main Classroom Building at Florida State University College of Law in Tallahassee, FL

The College of Law was founded in 1966, and holds classes in the B.K. Roberts building, named in honor of the Florida Supreme Court Justice's role in creating Tallahassee's first law school at nearby Florida A&M University, in 1949. Roberts held the State of Florida must provide African Americans some form of legal education in denying Virgil D. Hawkins admissions to the University of Florida Law School. Sixteen years later, the Florida legislature voted in 1965 to close FAMU law and open a law school at Florida State University by transferring allocated funds from FAMU law to Florida State University's law school.

== Admissions ==
For the class entering in 2023, the school accepted 695 applicants out of 3,290 (21.12%), with 139 of those accepted enrolling, a 20.00% yield rate. The median LSAT score was 165 and the median undergraduate GPA was 3.85. Two students were not included in both the LSAT and GPA calculations. Its 25th/75th percentile LSAT scores and GPA were 158/166 and 3.67/3.93.

== Rankings and reputation ==
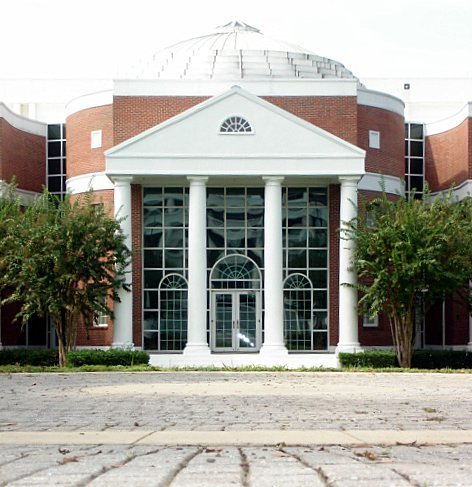
The D'Alemberte Rotunda, part of the College of Law, is used to host special events and in the past has been used by the Florida Supreme Court to convene special sessions

- In the 2025-2026 edition, U.S. News & World Report ranked FSU tied for 34th overall.

== Programs ==
The College of Law offers the Juris Doctor (J.D.), which is the professional degree in law. The three-year program provides students a foundational first-year program, a legal writing program, and a varied offering of upper-level courses, seminars, clinics, and co-curricular activities.

Externship programs exist in the United States and abroad — including at the International Bar Association in London, the International Criminal Tribunal for the former Yugoslavia in the Hague, the Special Court of Sierra Leone, in Washington, D.C., and in every major city in Florida, allowing students to spend a semester outside of Tallahassee.

The College of Law offers a Master of Laws (LL.M.) program in Environmental Law and Policy, as well as an LL.M. program for foreign lawyers. Additionally, the College of Law offers certificate programs and its faculty also offer a significant range of courses in Criminal Law.

The College of Law offers a Master of Studies in Law (J.M.), Juris Master degree. It has multiple concentrations and it is designed for non-attorneys to get a deep understanding of law in their respective fields of work. Some of these fields or specialties are Cyber Security, Financial Regulation, Employment Law, Human Resources Risk Management, Healthcare Regulation, Environmental Law, Criminal Law, etc. This masters degree program is a two year program for full-time working professionals and has rigorous requirements to be accepted into the program as it is very selective.

The College of Law offers joint degree programs allowing students to earn other degrees in conjunction with the J.D., including Master of Arts, Master of Science, Master of Business Administration, and Ph.D. degrees.

== Bar examination passage ==
The Charter Class (1969) is the first--and only--class in any law school in Florida to have a bar examination passage rate of 100%.[Dictum, Obiter, "Obiter Dictum Vol. 1, No. 1 (Fall, 1971)" (1971). Obiter Dictum. 2.https://ir.law.fsu.edu/obiter-dictum/2]

 In 2023, the overall bar examination passage rate for the law school’s first-time examination takers was 82.97%. The Ultimate Bar Pass Rate, which the ABA  defines as the passage rate for graduates who sat for bar examinations within two years of graduating, was 94.09% for the class of 2021.[3]

== Employment ==
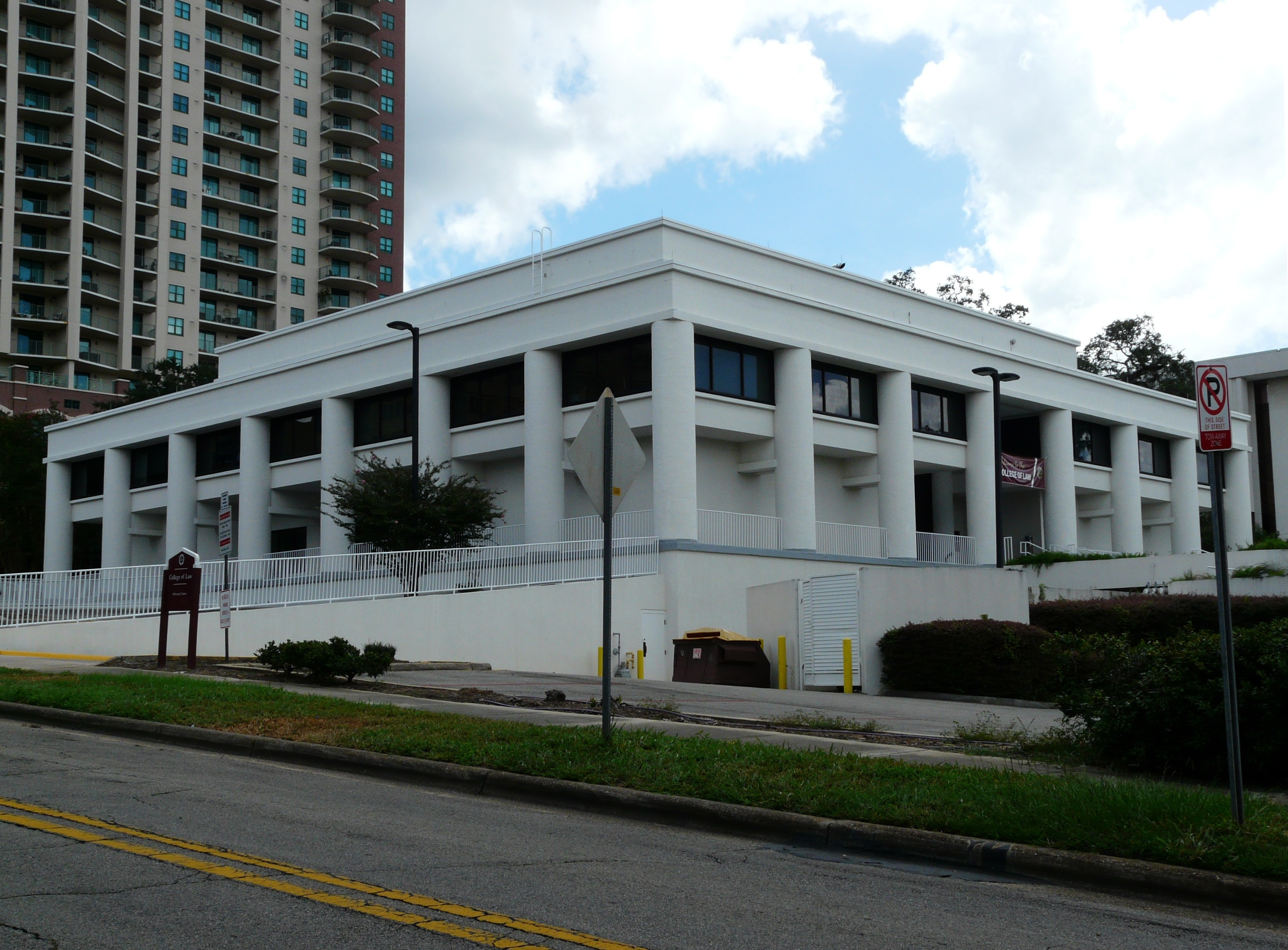
The College of Law Advocacy Center

According to Florida State University's official 2016 ABA-required disclosures, 72.6% of the Class of 2015 obtained full-time, long-term, bar passage required employment ten months after graduation. Florida State University's Law School Transparency under-employment score is 8.3%, indicating the percentage of the Class of 2015 unemployed, pursuing an additional degree, or working in a non-professional, short-term, or part-time job nine months after graduation.

== Faculty ==
The faculty scholarship of Florida State Law regularly ranks among the top 30 law schools based on downloads, according to the Social Science Research Network, which hosts working papers by Florida State Law Faculty in Public Law and Legal Theory, Law, Business & Economics and Sustainability Law & Policy.

Nationally prominent law professors at FSU include faculty in: Administrative and Regulatory Law (Mark Seidenfeld); Constitutional Law (Nat Stern); Criminal Law (Wayne Logan, Gary Kleck); Environmental, Energy and Land Use Law (Donna R. Christie, David L. Markell, Hannah Wiseman); International Law (Frederick M. Abbott, Fernando Tesón); Law & Humanities, including Legal Philosophy (Rob Atkinson and Fernando Tesón); Law, Economics & Business (Bruce L. Benson, Manuel Utset, Kelli Alces, Shawn Bayern); and Tax Law (Joseph M. Dodge, Steve Johnson, Jeffrey Kahn).

Florida State Law faculty members have published their own casebooks in environmental law — David Markell and Donna Christie. Other faculty authored books are widely used in law schools across the country for courses in Tax Law (Joseph M. Dodge), International Intellectual Property Law (Frederick M. Abbott), and Law and Economics (Mark Seidenfeld). Beyond the classroom, Florida State Law faculty members are regularly cited as authorities by courts, law reform bodies and other scholars. One faculty member, Sandy D'Alemberte, is a former president of both the American Bar Association and the National Judicature Society.

Affiliated faculty from other university departments holding courtesy appointments at the law school include John Scholz, a leading political scientist addressing regulatory enforcement; Bruce L. Benson, an economist focused and law and economics; R. Mark Isaac, a leading experimental economist; and Gary Kleck, a criminologist known for his work on guns and deterrence.

== Journals ==
The Florida State University Law Review is the flagship law review of Florida State Law. It publishes four issues a year.

The Journal of Land Use and Environmental Law is the state's first and remains its only student publication in the field. It ranks among the top environmental and land use law journals based on citations.

The Journal of Transnational Law & Policy publishes articles in the field of international law, including human rights, comparative law and U.S. foreign policy.

The Florida State University Business Review is a law journal published annually at the College of Law which examines the interrelated disciplines of business and law. Originally founded and published by second year law students in 2001, the Business Review has become an official journal of the College of Law.

== Alumni ==
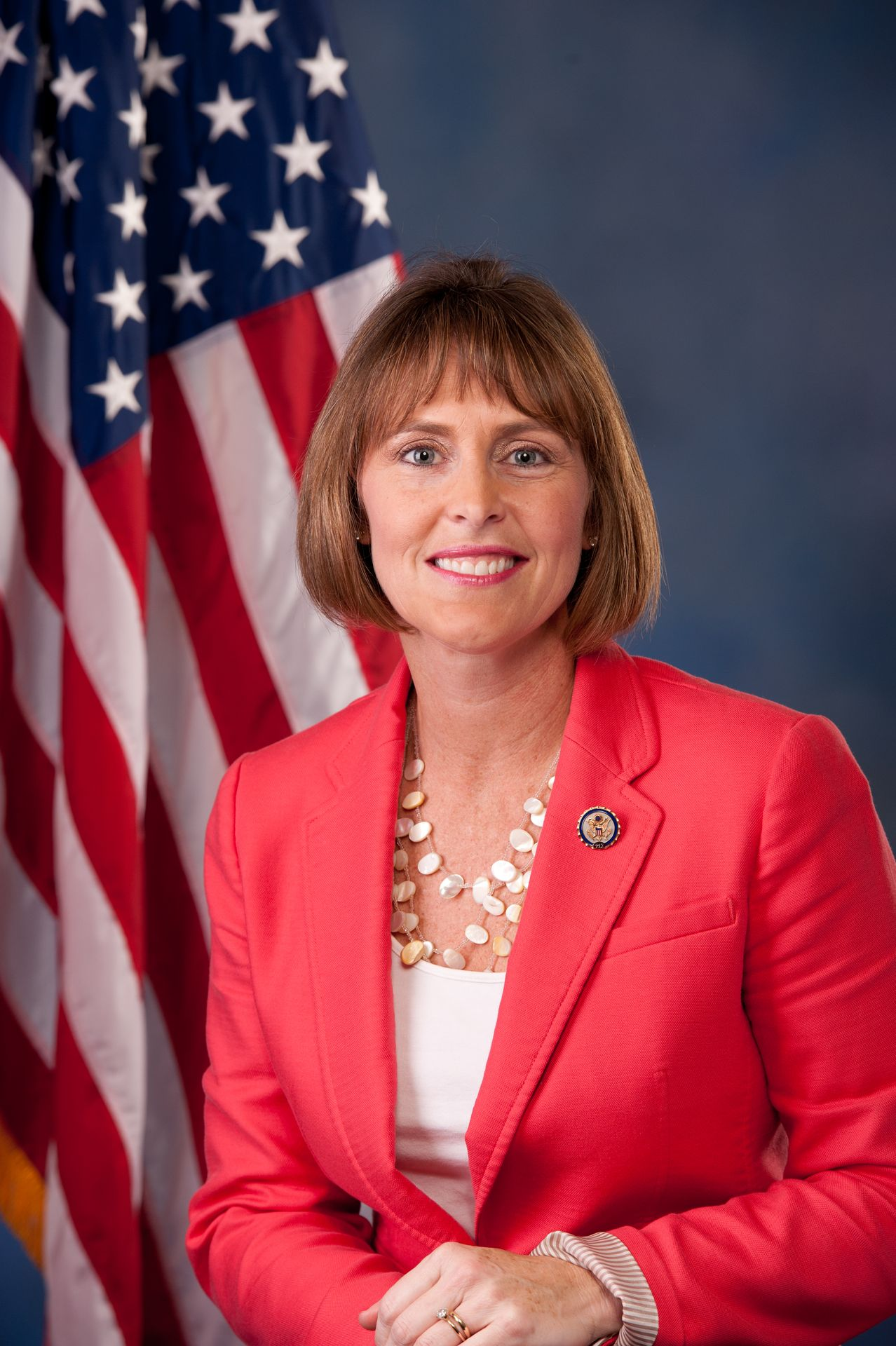
Kathy Castor

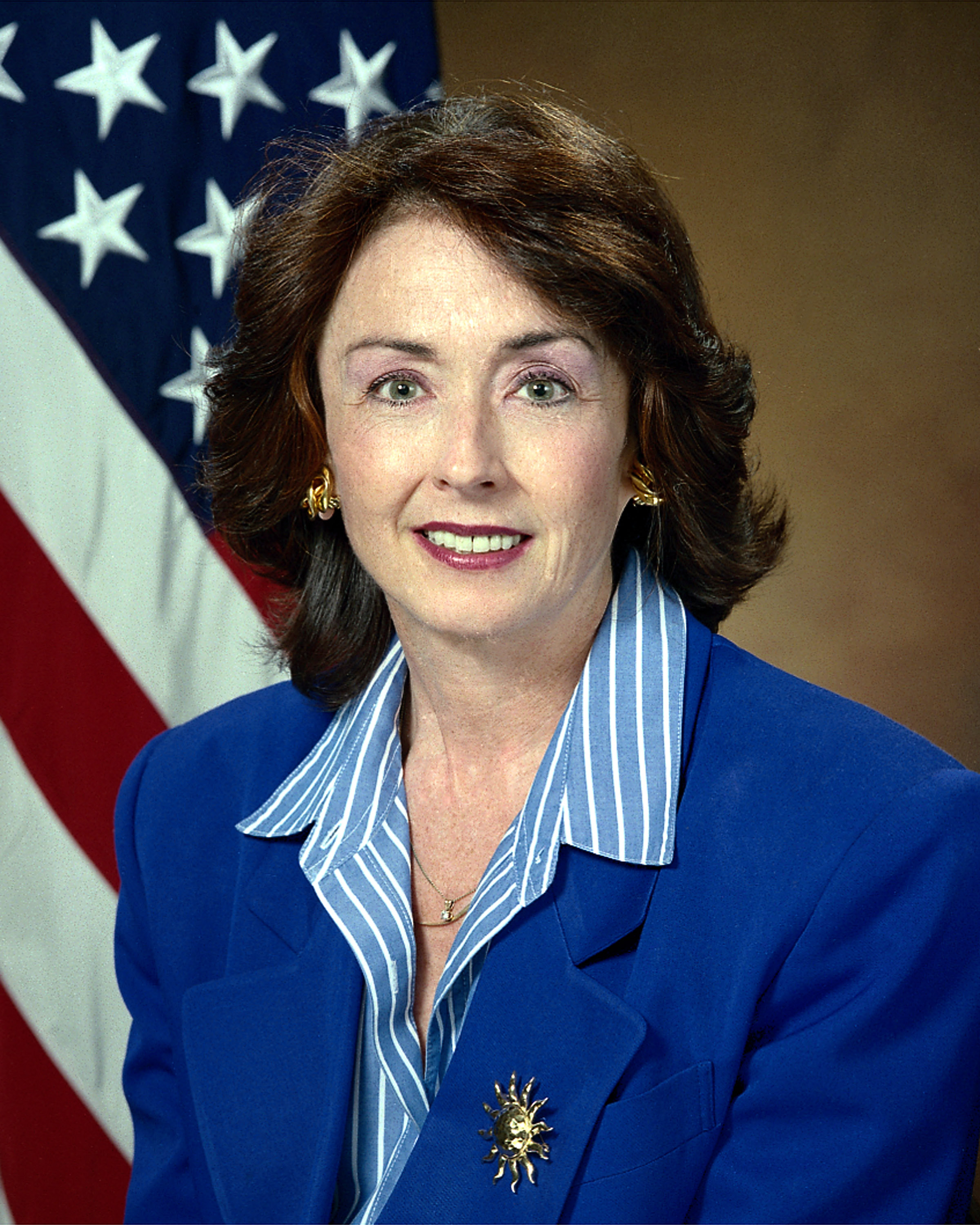
Eleanor Hill

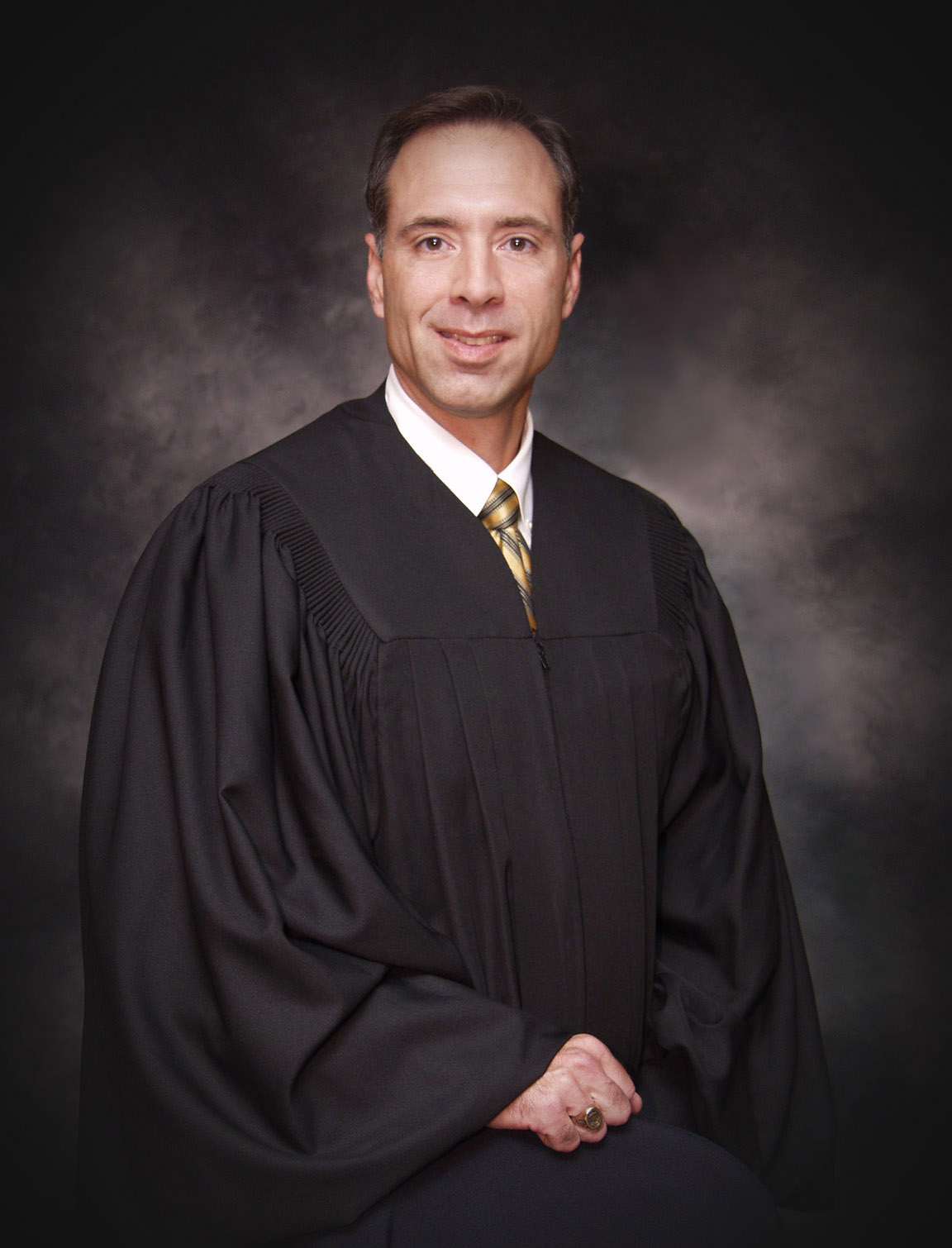
C. Alan Lawson

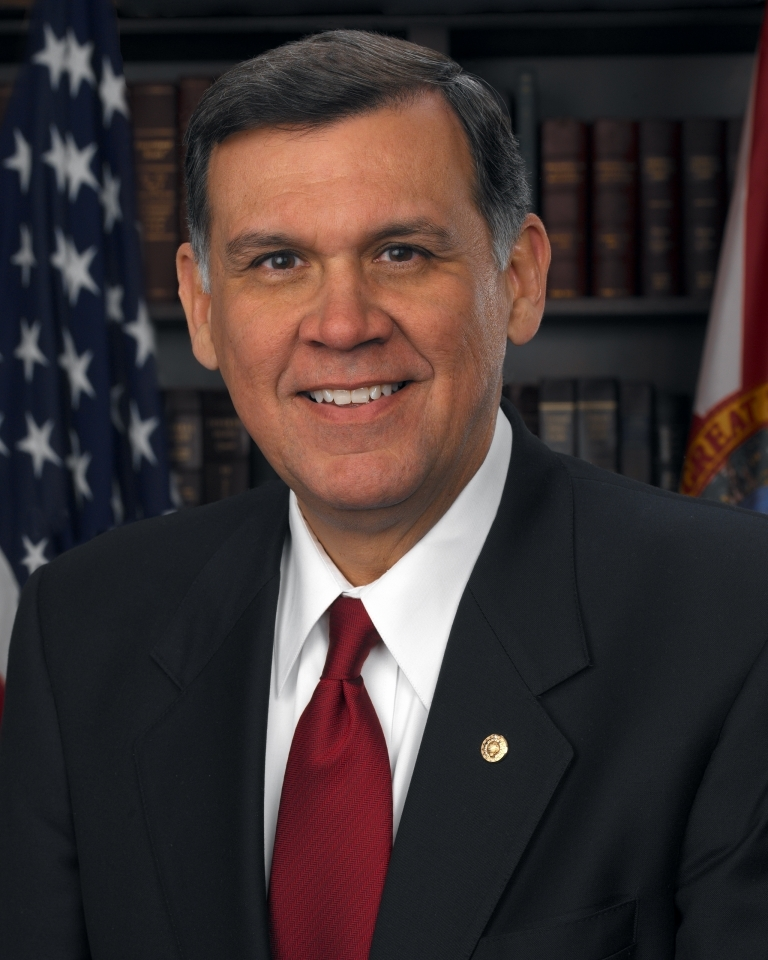
Mel Martinez

| Alumni | Notability |
|---|---|
| John Antoon | Current U.S. District Court Judge for the Middle District of Florida |
| Jim Bacchus | Former U.S. Representative; justice and chairman of the World Trade Organization Appellate Body |
| Rick Baker | Former mayor of St. Petersburg, Florida |
| Kenneth B. Bell | Former Florida Supreme Court justice |
| Terry Bowden | Current Head Football Coach, University of Akron |
| Shannon Bream | Fox News Channel correspondent |
| Kathy Castor | Current U.S. Representative |
| Lacey A. Collier | Current U.S. District Court Judge for the Northern District of Florida |
| Benjamin Crump | Lead attorney for the family of Trayvon Martin |
| W. Thomas Cumbie | Current Senior Judge for the United States Air Force, also a Colonel |
| Dwight Dudley | Former member of the Florida House of Representatives |
| Steven Geller | Former member Florida Senate Minority Leader |
| Adam Hasner | Former Florida House of Representatives Majority Leader |
| Eleanor J. Hill | Former United States Department of Defense Inspector General |
| Skip Horack | Writer and former lecturer at Stanford University |
| Tim Howard | former director of Northeastern University's Executive Doctorate Program in Law & Policy |
| Michael W. Jackson | Prosecutor of landmark 1965 Civil Rights Case and featured in White Lies Podcast |
| Mark E. Kaplan | Former Secretary for the Florida Department of Transportation |
| Tony La Russa | Former manager for the St. Louis Cardinals |
| C. Alan Lawson | Justice of the Supreme Court of Florida |
| Steven Leifman | Judge on the Eleventh Judicial Circuit Court of Florida |
| Marcelo Llorente | Former member of the Florida House of Representatives |
| Stephen MacNamara | Former Chief of Staff for Florida Governor Rick Scott |
| John Marks | Former mayor of Tallahassee, Florida |
| Mel Martinez | Former U.S. Senator; former Secretary of Housing and Urban Development |
| Craig McCarthy | Attorney on a number of high-profile cases and candidate for the Florida House of Representatives |
| Anne McGihon | Current member of the Colorado House of Representatives |
| Seth Miller | Executive Director of the Innocence Project Florida |
| Gary Pajcic | Former attorney and philanthropist |
| Ricky Polston | Current Florida Supreme Court justice |
| Ion Sancho | Former Supervisor of Elections for Leon County, Florida, gained notoriety in the 2000 presidential recount |
| Mary Stenson Scriven | Current U.S. District Court Judge for the Middle District of Florida |
| John E. Thrasher | Former president of Florida State University, former member of the Florida Senate, former chair of the Republican Party of Florida, 90th Speaker of the Florida House of Representatives, former member of the Florida House of Representatives, Captain in the United States Army |
| Carlos O. Torano | Current president of Toraño Cigars and Central America Tobacco |
| H. James Towey | Current president of Ave Maria University, and former director of the White House Office of Faith-Based and Community Initiatives |
| George Tragos | Criminal Defense attorney |
| J. Alex Villalobos | Former member of the Florida Senate |
| John Wood | Former member of the Florida House of Representatives |

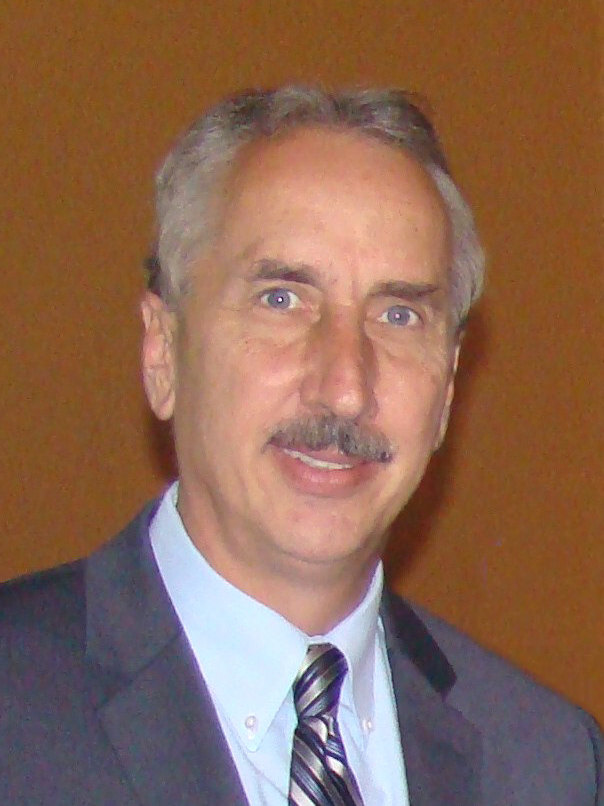
Rick Baker

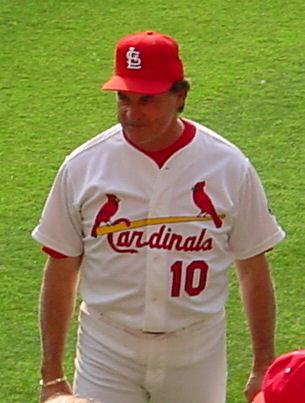
Tony LaRussa

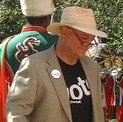
Ion Sancho

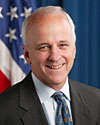
Jim Towey

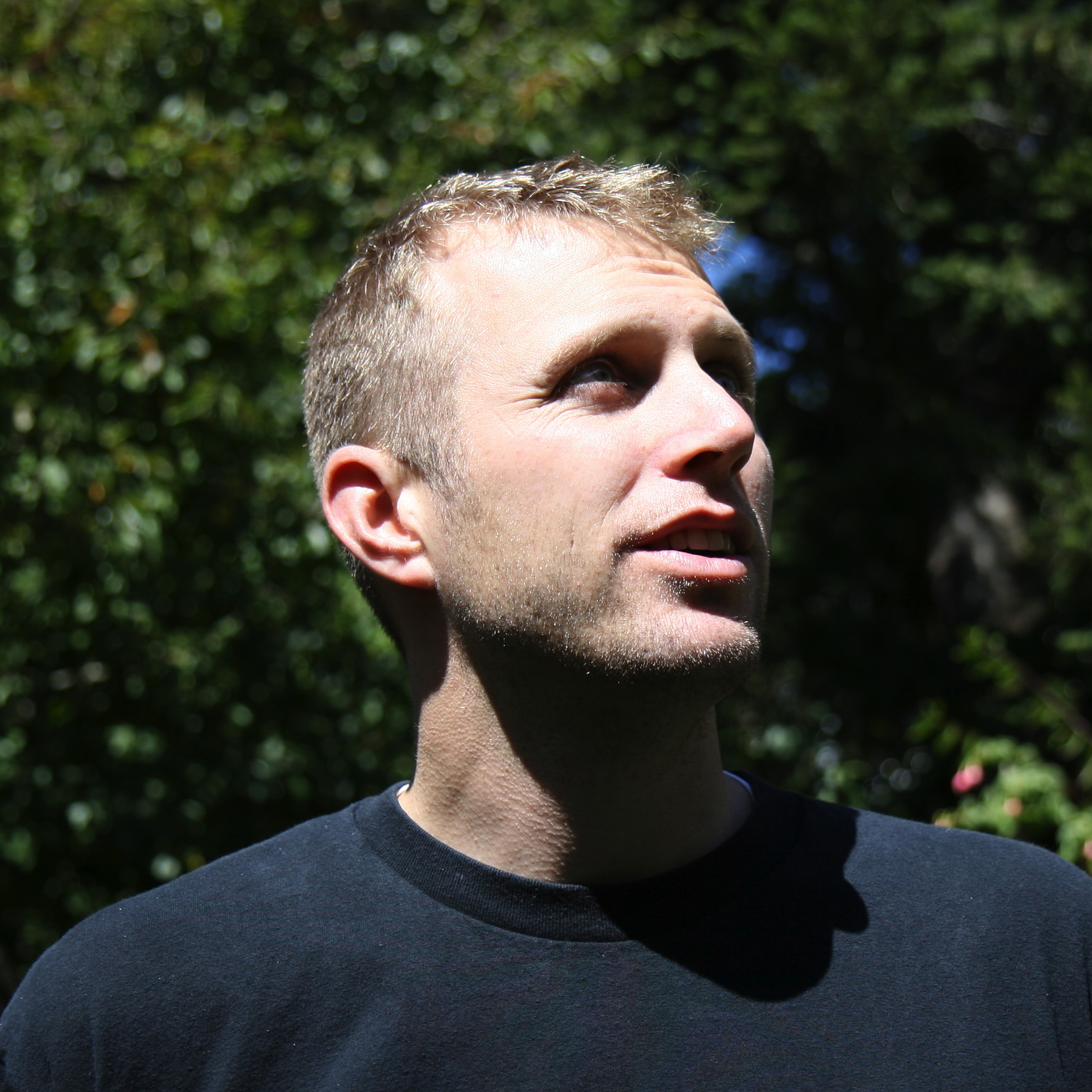
Skip Horack
