= Florida State University Law Review =

- Discipline: Law review
- Language: English
- Edited by: Aidan Browne

Publication details
- History: 1970–present
- Publisher: Florida State University College of Law (United States)
- Frequency: Quarterly
- Open access: Yes

Standard abbreviations
- Bluebook: Fla. St. U. L. Rev.
- ISO 4: Fla. State Univ. Law Rev.

Indexing
- ISSN: 0096-3070

Links
- Journal homepage; University IR Page

The Florida State University Law Review is the flagship law review at the Florida State University College of Law. It publishes four issues per year and is generally recognized among the top 200 student-edited law reviews in the United States.

== Overview ==
The Florida State University Law Review publishes four issues per year, with each issue containing a collection of articles, essays, and student-written notes. The pieces are authored by academics, judges, clerks, attorneys, and current students of the College of Law. The journal has published articles by Supreme Court justices John Paul Stevens (Volumes 13 and 47) and William Rehnquist (Volume 14). Additionally, the journal has published articles by prominent academics, including Marvin Chirelstein, Melvin A. Eisenberg, Donald J. Weidner, Richard Posner, Eric Posner, Richard Hasen, and Mark Seidenfeld. The journal is staffed and edited by second- and third-year students of the Florida State University College of Law.

The Florida State University Law Review has published numerous symposiums, including those on Bush v. Gore, the life of professor Dan Markel, former American Bar Association President and FSU President Emeritus Sandy D'Alamberte, and former Speaker of the Florida House of Representatives and President Emeritus of Florida State University John Thrasher.

== List of Editors-in-Chief ==
Volume	Years	Name
5	1977-1978	Jim Bacchus
35	2007-2008	Alyssa Lathrop
36	2008-2009	Rachel Nordby
46	2018-2019	Daniel Buchholz
47	2019-2020	Hannah Rodgers
48	2020-2021	Nicole Molner
49	2021-2022	Hannah Murphy
50	2022-2023	Anna Kelly Kegelmeyer
51	2023-2024	Elizabeth Halperin
52	2024-2025	Kole Kolasa
53	2025-2026	Jack Rowan
54	2026-2027	Aidan Browne
