= Erin O'Hara O'Connor =

American academic administrator, law professor and lawyer

8th Dean of the Florida State University College of Law
- Incumbent
- Assumed office July 2016
- Preceded by: Donald J. Weidner

Personal details
- Born: 1965 (age 60–61)
- Education: University of Rochester; Georgetown University Law Center

Erin O'Hara O'Connor (born 1965) is an American academic administrator, law professor, and lawyer. She has served as the 8th dean of the Florida State University College of Law since 2016. She is the first female in the role. O'Connor was previously the Milton R. Underwood Professor of Law at Vanderbilt University Law School.

== Life ==
O'Connor was born in 1965 to Elizabeth Purvis O'Hara and raised in Buffalo, New York. She completed a B.A. in economics and political science at the University of Rochester in 1987. She earned a J.D., magna cum laude, at the Georgetown University Law Center in 1990. She was a senior board member of The Georgetown Law Journal.

From 1990 to 1991, O'Connor clerked for Dolores Sloviter of the United States Court of Appeals for the Third Circuit. She was a Bigelow teaching fellow and lecturer in law at the University of Chicago Law School from 1991 to 1992. From the fall of 1992 until the fall of 1994, she was a visiting assistant professor in the departments of legal studies, economics, and finance at Clemson University. She joined George Mason University School of Law in the spring of 1995 as an assistant professor. She was promoted to associate professor in 1998.

O'Connor joined the faculty at Vanderbilt University Law School in 2001. She served as the director of the law and human behavior program from 2007 to 2010, associate dean for academic affairs from 2008 to 2010, and the FedEx professor of law from 2010 to 2011. O'Connor was the Milton R. Underwood Professor of Law and director of the graduate studies for the Ph.D. program in law and economics at the Vanderbilt University Law School. In July 2016, O'Connor succeeded Donald J. Weidner as the 8th dean of the Florida State University College of Law. She is also the McKenzie Professor of Law. She is the first female dean of the college of law.

Academic offices
| Preceded by Donald J. Weidner | 8th Dean of the Florida State University College of Law; 2016–present | Incumbent |
