= Seidenfeld =

Seidenfeld is a surname. Notable people with the surname include:

- Ian Seidenfeld (born 2001), American para table tennis player
- Mark Seidenfeld, American legal academic
- Mitchell Seidenfeld (born 1963), American para table tennis player
- Teddy Seidenfeld, American statistician and philosopher
