= Dave Weldon =

American politician and physician (born 1953)

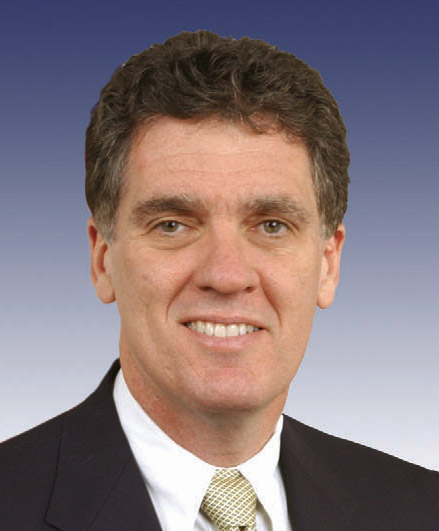
- Official portrait, 2005

Member of the U.S. House of Representatives from Florida's 15th district
- In office January 3, 1995 – January 3, 2009
- Preceded by: Jim Bacchus
- Succeeded by: Bill Posey

Personal details
- Born: David Joseph Weldon; August 31, 1953 (age 73) Amityville, New York, U.S.
- Party: Republican
- Spouse: Nancy Weldon (m. 1979)
- Children: 2
- Education: Stony Brook University (BS); University at Buffalo (MD)

Military service
- Branch/service: United States Army
- Years of service: 1981–1987 (active); 1987–1992 (reserve)
- Unit: United States Army Reserve

David Joseph Weldon (born August 31, 1953) is an American physician and former Republican politician who represented Florida's 15th congressional district in the United States House of Representatives from 1995 to 2009. An internal medicine physician before entering politics, Weldon focused in Congress on space policy, veterans' health, and biomedical research funding. He served on the House Appropriations Committee and worked on NASA and Department of Defense priorities affecting Kennedy Space Center and Florida's Space Coast.

After leaving Congress, Weldon returned to medical practice and remained active in public policy and nonprofit work. He served as chairman of the Israel Allies Foundation and held teaching and advisory roles at the Florida Institute of Technology, where he donated his congressional archives.

== Early life ==
Weldon was born on August 31, 1953, in Amityville, New York, to Anna, a foreign-language teacher, and David Weldon Sr., a decorated World War II Army combat veteran. He earned a Bachelor of Science in biochemistry from the State University of New York at Stony Brook in 1978 and a Doctor of Medicine from the University at Buffalo in 1981.

Weldon completed a residency in internal medicine at Letterman Army Medical Center in San Francisco. He served as a physician in the U.S. Army from 1981 to 1987, rising to the rank of major, and in the Army Reserve from 1987 to 1992. After leaving active duty, he entered private practice in internal medicine on Florida's Space Coast.

== Career ==
=== U.S. House of Representatives ===
Weldon was first elected to the U.S. House in 1994 during the Republican Revolution led by Newt Gingrich, winning Florida's 15th congressional district seat vacated by Democratic representative Jim Bacchus. The district included most of Brevard, Indian River, and Osceola counties and part of Polk County, including the Space Coast and Kennedy Space Center. He served seven consecutive terms from January 1995 to January 2009, choosing not to seek reelection in 2008.

Weldon served on the House Appropriations, Science, Education and Labor, Government Reform, and Banking committees and was a member of the Republican Study Committee. He co-founded the Congressional Aerospace Caucus and advocated for the Space Shuttle program, the International Space Station, and the Commercial Space Act. He also secured federal funding for the East Central Florida VA Clinic and for land acquisition to expand the Archie Carr National Wildlife Refuge in Brevard County.

In 2004, Weldon introduced a conscience clause provision that became known as the Weldon Amendment and was included in the Consolidated Appropriations Act, 2005. It prohibits federal, state, and local government agencies receiving federal funds from discriminating against healthcare providers, insurers, or facilities that decline to provide, pay for, cover, or refer patients for abortion services. The provision has been renewed in subsequent Health and Human Services appropriations legislation.

Weldon also sponsored the Fetus Farming Prohibition Act of 2006, signed into law by President George W. Bush on July 19, 2006. The law prohibits the solicitation or acceptance of tissue from fetuses created for research purposes and of tissue or cells from a fetus gestated in a nonhuman animal. He also sponsored the Human Cloning Prohibition Act of 2005 and the Incapacitated Persons Legal Protection Act, introduced during the Terri Schiavo case.

With Democratic representative Eliot Engel, Weldon co-founded the Congressional Israel Allies Caucus. He also played bass in The Second Amendments, a country-rock band composed of members of Congress.

In 2007, Weldon and Representative Carolyn Maloney introduced the Vaccine Safety and Public Confidence Assurance Act, which would have transferred responsibility for vaccine safety research from the CDC to an independent agency within the Department of Health and Human Services.

Weldon was a vocal advocate for medical privacy rights, sponsoring legislation to limit government access to patient health records without consent.

=== Post-congressional career ===
After leaving Congress, Weldon returned to private practice at Health First Medical Group in Malabar, Florida. He also taught physiology and pathophysiology in the Department of Biomedical Engineering at the Florida Institute of Technology and later became a university trustee. He donated his congressional archives to the university.

In May 2012, Weldon entered the Republican primary for the U.S. Senate in Florida, but lost to Connie Mack IV.

Weldon became chairman of the Israel Allies Foundation following the death of Rabbi Benny Elon. In January 2017, he was appointed president of the Alliance of Health Care Sharing Ministries, a trade association representing Christian healthcare cost-sharing organizations.

In February 2023, Weldon filed to run for the Florida House of Representatives in District 32, an open seat covering portions of central and southern Brevard County, including Viera, Rockledge, and Eau Gallie. He faced state senator Debbie Mayfield in the Republican primary and was endorsed by outgoing state representative Thad Altman, U.S. representative Bill Posey, and Brevard County Sheriff Wayne Ivey. He lost the election to Mayfield.

On November 22, 2024, President-elect Donald Trump announced his intent to nominate Weldon as director of the CDC. On March 13, 2025, hours before Weldon was scheduled to testify before the Senate Committee on Health, Education, Labor and Pensions, the White House withdrew his nomination. According to his critics, he has promoted the scientifically disproved claim of a causal link between vaccines and autism. Previously, he appeared in the anti-vaccine movie Vaxxed. Weldon has called himself a supporter of vaccines and has voiced support of COVID-19 vaccines.

== Personal life ==
Weldon married Nancy Weldon in 1979. They have two adult children and live in Indialantic, Florida.

== See also ==
- 2008 United States House of Representatives elections in Florida

U.S. House of Representatives
Preceded by Jim Bacchus	Member of the U.S. House of Representatives from Florida's 15th congressional district 1995–2009	Succeeded by Bill Posey
U.S. order of precedence (ceremonial)
Preceded by Porter Goss as Former U.S. Representative	Order of precedence of the United States as Former U.S. Representative	Succeeded by Allen Boyd as Former U.S. Representative
