= Rothwesten =

Village in Hesse, Germany

Coordinates: 51°23′12″N 9°31′17″E

Rothwesten is a village in the municipality Fuldatal, in the Kassel district, Hesse, Germany. It was the site of a post World War II American sector displaced person camp, and later Rothwesten Air Base.

The Currency Reform of 1948 was planned in Rothwesten.
