= Currency Reform of 1948 =

Currency reform in Western Germany

The currency reform of 1948 (German: Währungsreform 1948) went into effect on June 20, 1948, in the Trizone, the three western occupation zones of Germany. From June 21, 1948, the Deutsche Mark ("DM", also "D-Mark") was the sole legal tender there. The two previously valid means of payment, the Reichsmark and the Rentenmark of equivalent value (both abbreviated as "RM"), were removed from circulation and replaced by the Deutschmark. The currency reform of 1948 is one of the most significant economic policy measures in post-war German history. It enabled the Western occupation zones to receive Marshall Plan aid and was thereby one of the prerequisites of the Economic Miracle of the 1950s.

== Situation prior to reform ==
From 1936 to 1945, the financing of rearmament and the creation of money and compulsory levies from occupied territories resulted in a large excess of printed currency. Shortly before World War II, food was only available with monthly food stamps at fixed prices, and many civilian goods were only available with a ration card. As the basic principles of price formation by supply and demand were invalidated by comprehensive rationing, the external value of the Reichsmark was largely separated from the market. Compounding the issue, restrictions on foreign exchange prevented the outflow of surplus money and resulted in a decline in any value the RM still had. The Nazi government paid for bomb damage quickly to benefit morale. In 1945 the money supply was five to six times greater than the actual value of the economy.

Banks reopened quickly after the war—3000 were taking deposits in the Twelfth United States Army Group's territory in May 1945—but as owners of the 450 billion ℛ︁ℳ︁ war debt, banks and the people were bankrupt. There was a significant scarcity of goods caused by the destruction of infrastructure, restrictions on agricultural production, and the dismantling of industrial facilities as part of an Allied effort to prevent Germany from regaining military industrial capacity. A major cause was also the large-scale hoarding of goods by the German people in anticipation of a currency reform. Near the end of February 1946, the normal consumer food ration in the Bizone (territory occupied by the US and UK) was reduced to 1014 calories daily. The low caloric intake was another reason for the decline in industrial production. In response to the ration change, weekly coal production dropped to well under half of the 1936 level.

The winter of 1946–47 was especially bitter and resulted in a poor harvest and a jump in unemployment, exacerbating the situation further. In Berlin, prices rose for basic goods like coal lighters (100%), soap (833%), and candles (2500–4000%). Food prices on the black market were often higher than the legal prices by a factor of more than 100. In Berlin, many prices were posted in Reichsmarks but would only be sold through bartering, such as six bottles of schnapps for three men's shirts. Workers used more time trading on the black market for essential or profitable supplies than at work. One significant example of an alternate means of exchange at the time was the 'cigarette currency' (the "Ami"). In this case, 7 RM constituted about one cigarette.

A OMGUS group led by Joseph M. Dodge, Gerhard Colm, and Raymond Goldsmith created in early 1946 a plan for a new German currency, but the French and Soviets on the Allied Control Council (ACC) opposed it. Despite the ACC's efforts to establish a new, universal currency for all four zones of occupation, the members of the council were unable to come to an agreement due to conflicts over the assignment of authority over the reform.

== Implementation ==
The American military government on 20 April 1948 took 11 business, finance, and union experts to Rothwesten, including Hans Möller, Walter Dudek, Otto Ernst Pfleiderer, and Wilhelmine Dreiβig. Edward A. Tenenbaum told them that they would not leave until the German economic situation was resolved. Secrecy was vital; outgoing mail was censored and telephone calls were banned, as the Soviet sector could flood the Trizone, the American-British-French sectors, with ℛ︁ℳ︁ to destablize the economy. The experts mostly worked on regulations and public relations, as Tenenbaum and the military government imposed most of the details, but decided that 100 ℛ︁ℳ︁ would be exchanged for 6.50 DM, with all wages, salaries, and contracts converted on a one-to-one basis. Tenenbaum devised "Deutsche Mark" as a temporary name that became permanent. The group completed its work on 8 June. (While Ludwig Erhard initiated important economic reforms after the Deutsche Mark's implementation, and later described the currency as his and Tenenbaum's creation, he was not a member of the group.)

=== Announcement of the currency reform ===
On Friday, 18 June, the radio announced a new currency for the Trizone on 21 June. From 1947 to 1948 the American Bank Note Company had printed 5.7 billion DM that was now at Frankfurt. On 20 June, the British Government published British Military Government Law No. 61 in the Military Government Gazette (Amtsblatt der Militärregierung), the official publication for legal and public announcements in West Germany from 1946 to 1990. British Military Government Law No. 61 was instrumental in the process of replacing the Reichsmark with the Deutschmark, since it spread the news to the German public about how this new currency was to be implemented. As part of the Western Allies’ coordinated efforts, this law set the framework for implementing the currency reform in the British-occupied zone, addressing critical issues like the distribution of the new Deutschmark and the removal of excess currency from circulation.

Multiple key provisions were outlined for the German public, in particular the plan for the initial distribution of the new currency. Article I of the Law outlined the currencies recognized as legal tender in West Germany, specifying that the Allied Military Mark and Rentenbank notes would be devalued to one-tenth of their former value. Additionally, these currencies were set to lose their status as legal tender two months after the law's enactment, ensuring a clear transition to the new Deutschmark. Furthermore, under Article VI of the Law, each West German (Trizone) resident received an initial sum of 40 DM as start-up money, followed by a second installment of 20 DM, ensuring that all citizens had access to the new currency regardless of prior cash assets.

The reform began with an immediate cash infusion that was issued to individuals and the public sector, a conversion of all RM cash holdings to DM, and the establishment of the DM as the only legal means of payment. To alleviate the excessive money supply, the conversion to DM reduced all cash holdings and bank accounts to 6.5% of their Reichsmark denominations, and the money supply was limited to a total of DM 10 billion with a possible increase to 11 billion with administrative approval.

== Effects ==
Although the German experts distanced themselves from the new currency as most of the details were imposed by Tenenbaum rather than devised by them, the Deutsche Mark was very successful. The most immediate effect of the currency reform was the sudden availability of retail products on store shelves. Though the increase in production was quick in coming, it was not fast enough to explain the sudden relative abundance of goods – at first it was primarily the result of the black market dissolving and the stocks of contraband held there entering the open market. In some fields of industry production was nearly at prewar levels by November 1948. The Neue Deutsche Wochenschau sarcastically said "The cherries ripened overnight".

Coincidentally, the reform was accompanied by a climatic improvement after the severe winter of 1946/47, with abundant harvests in the agricultural year 1948-49. The good weather, augmented by record usage of fertilizer and improved efforts on the part of the farmers, resulted in a harvest that dramatically exceeded expectations. The improvement was compounded by the currency reform, as farmers had a stable currency with which to hire labor, buy equipment, and acquire fertilizers to work their fields. Although this did not eliminate the necessity for the importation of food, it represented progress, since the agricultural center of Germany had been in the East. The existence of a trusted currency also made international trade more viable, enabling West Germany to import additional food.
