= Circuit split =

Legal predicament

U.S. Courts of Appeals and District Courts map. There are 13 circuit courts of appeals in the United States; a U.S. court of appeals only binds courts in their circuit

In United States federal courts, a circuit split, also known as a split of authority or split in authority, occurs when two or more different circuit courts of appeals provide conflicting rulings on the same legal issue. The existence of a circuit split is one of the factors that the Supreme Court of the United States considers when deciding whether to grant review of a case. Some scholars suggest that the Supreme Court is more likely to grant review of a case to resolve a circuit split than for any other reason.

Despite the desire of the Supreme Court to resolve conflicts between circuit courts, legal scholars disagree about whether circuit splits are ultimately detrimental or beneficial. Some argue that circuit splits are harmful because they create confusion and encourage forum shopping, while other scholars argue that variation among circuits allows local courts to experiment with new laws that reflect the values of the local residents. Scholars have also observed that regional variations in different areas of the United States have provided certain circuits with a particular specialization or expertise in some subjects of law.

== Origins ==
Article III of the United States Constitution specifies that "[t]he judicial Power of the United States, shall be vested in one supreme Court, and in such inferior Courts as the Congress may from time to time ordain and establish." In 1789, Congress created the first system of intermediate appellate courts, known as federal circuit courts, which had appellate jurisdiction over certain matters decided by district courts. These federal circuit courts consisted of two justices from the Supreme Court of the United States and one district court judge. In 1891, Congress created the existing system of United States courts of appeals, which hear appeals from United States district courts within limited geographic areas. For example, the United States Court of Appeals for the Fifth Circuit hears appeals originating from United States district courts in Louisiana, Mississippi, and Texas. Decisions in circuit courts are usually made by rotating three-judge panels chosen from judges sitting within that circuit, and circuit courts also occasionally decide cases en banc.

Circuit courts do not collaborate or work with other circuits to resolve legal issues, and different circuit courts may reach conflicting conclusions about the same legal issue. Furthermore, cases decided in one circuit are not binding authority on other circuits. If the Supreme Court of the United States has not ruled on a legal issue, federal courts of appeals resolve these issues "as they see fit, subject only to a norm of intracircuit stare decisis." When a circuit split occurs, there is rarely an even numeric division among courts of appeals with regard to how the dispute should be resolved. In fact, one study found that courts of appeals split evenly in less than one third of all circuit splits. Occasionally, separate courts of appeals will reach three or more different conclusions with regard to the same legal issue.

== Significance ==
Some scholars criticize the existence of circuit splits, while other scholars suggest that circuit splits may, in fact, be beneficial. Others simply argue that circuit splits may not be ideal, but problems associated with inter-circuit conflicts are overstated. For example, Fourth Circuit Court of Appeals Judge Harvie Wilkinson once stated the "world will not end because a few circuit splits are left unresolved."

=== Criticisms of circuit splits ===
Legal analysts have identified problems associated with circuit splits. Jesse M. Boodoo, for example, suggests that circuit splits create a state of confusion and uncertainty for citizens. Because different laws are applied and enforced in different jurisdictions, Daniel J. Meador has argued that Circuit splits may create a judicial "Tower of Babel." Additionally, Wayne A. Logan has argued that if courts speak with a unified voice, this will "secure popular respect for judicial authority." Likewise, Matthew Lund cautions that circuit splits will lead to forum shopping, where litigants flock to jurisdictions with more favorable laws. Judge Kimberly A. Moore also suggests that circuit splits and forum shopping lead to economic inefficiency because outcomes are unpredictable and litigants are less likely to settle.

Scholars have also argued that inconsistent application of laws in different circuits is inherently unfair. Trevor W. Morrison, for example, claims that circuit splits create potential due process conflicts if criminal defendants are unaware that their behavior constitutes criminal activity in that circuit. An article in the New England Journal on Criminal & Civil Confinement also suggested that there is the potential for the unconstitutional ex post facto application of law after circuit splits are resolved. Additionally, Jesse M. Boodoo argues that federal agencies tasked with enforcing laws throughout the United States may face challenges implementing regulatory measures when federal legislation is interpreted differently in separate circuits.

=== Arguments in favor of circuit splits ===
Legal scholars have also identified benefits associated with circuit splits. For example, Justice Louis Brandeis praised the fact that splits of opinion among courts allow jurisdictions to experiment with new developments in law without risking harm to other jurisdictions. Judge Diane P. Wood has suggested that circuit splits and "disagreements with colleagues force judges to sharpen their writing, push them to defend their positions, and from time to time persuade them that someone else's perspective is preferable". Amanda Frost has argued that negative attitudes toward circuit splits may hinder progress and creative problem solving because "[c]ourts of appeals are generally hesitant to depart from precedent set in other jurisdictions, despite being under no obligation to adhere to decisions by sister circuits." Consequently, Frost suggests that uniformity among circuits may be "overvalued." Likewise, Wayne A. Logan suggests that circuit splits may also be beneficial by virtue of the fact that citizens in different parts of the country have different preferences for how to structure their laws. Additionally, Judge J. Clifford Wallace has argued that there is nothing inherently wrong with different laws existing in different circuits, and "if conflicts were by their very nature unacceptable, the traditional rule denying precedential status to out-of-circuit decisions probably would not have enjoyed its long history."

== Resolving circuit splits at the Supreme Court of the United States ==
"[T]he ultimate guiding rule, should be announced by the Supreme Court, so that there may be uniformity of decision in the several circuits courts of appeal, and also uniformity of decision in the State Courts insofar as federal matters are concerned."

— Associate Supreme Court Justice Willis Van Devanter testifying before the United States Senate Committee on the Judiciary in 1924

One of the primary functions of the Supreme Court of the United States is to ensure that laws are interpreted uniformly among intermediate courts of appeal. Unless the legislature takes action, the United States Supreme Court is the only source of resolution for conflicts among intermediate courts of appeal. Consequently, the existence of a circuit split may be a key factor when the Supreme Court decides whether to accept a case. Although the Court always maintains discretion over whether it should grant review of a case, the Rules of the Supreme Court of the United States specifically state that the existence of a circuit split is one of the factors the Court considers when deciding whether to grant review. Philip Allen Lacovara and H.W. Perry both claim that the existence of a circuit split is "the single most important generalizable factor" that determines whether the Supreme Court will grant review of a case.

Indeed, justices sometimes cite the lack of a circuit split as a reason to deny review in a case.

Although federal judges are prohibited from commenting publicly "on the merits of a matter pending or impending in any court", Judge Alfred T. Goodwin has stated that circuit court judges will occasionally create circuit splits to "hold the Supreme Court's toes to the fire" and force the Supreme Court to overrule precedent in other circuits. Goodwin also wrote that "some of our number actually found it intellectually stimulating to challenge the Supreme Court from time to time" but that those judges "usually were rewarded by a Nine Zip reversal". Likewise, Judge Charles R. Wilson noted that when he drafted dissenting opinions, he would consider whether the parties planned to appeal the case to the Supreme Court of the United States, and "[i]f I believe that the parties will [file an appeal], I write the dissent with the Supreme Court in mind". C. Steven Bradford has also argued that circuit courts will "disregard a Supreme Court precedent if convinced that the Supreme Court would not follow it".

A study of Supreme Court cases during the first six terms of the Roberts Court (2005–2010) resolving circuit splits found that the Supreme Court upheld the view held by the majority of circuits in 51.5 percent of all cases. This same study found the greatest agreement when deciding legal issues between the Fifth and Tenth circuits (80.6 percent), the First and Second circuits (73.5 percent), and the Fifth and Fourth circuits (73.0 percent). The circuit courts that agreed the least frequently were the Ninth and Fourth circuits (39.0 percent) and the Ninth and Seventh circuits (39.2 percent). Additionally, a study analyzing cases from the 2010 term found that nearly two thirds of Supreme Court decisions resolving circuit splits were decided unanimously or by an 8-1 vote.

== Specialization among circuit courts of appeals ==
The eleven numbered circuit courts of appeals and the District of Columbia Circuit have appellate jurisdiction over cases in almost every area of the law arising within the boundaries of that circuit. However, the subjects that appear more frequently in each circuit vary according to the kinds of cases that arise more often within the circuit's boundaries. For example, the District of Columbia Circuit, which contains the federal capital, hears a large number of administrative law cases. Likewise, the Second Circuit, which contains New York, hears nearly one third of all federal securities law appeals, while the Fifth Circuit, which covers more than half of the Mexico–United States border, hears approximately half of all federal immigration appeals. Eric Hansford argues that this has led to "specialized" courts with particular expertise with the subjects that appear before the court more frequently. Studies also suggest that the Supreme Court is more likely to affirm decisions of circuit courts when the circuit court has ruled on a case for which they possess special expertise.

In some specialized areas of the law, cases are assigned to a court of appeals that possesses expertise in that area of the law. For example, Congress created the Court of Appeals for the Federal Circuit as an exclusive federal court of appeals for patent cases. Congress noted that consolidating cases in a single court of appeals would "strengthen the United States patent system in such a way as to foster technological growth and industrial innovation." Because of its role as a specialist court, circuit splits rarely exist between the Federal Circuit and other circuit courts of appeal. In his opinion in Markman v. Westview Instruments, Inc., Justice David Souter observed that avoiding conflicting rulings among circuit courts in patent law cases benefits the economy by providing legal certainty to businesses.

== Examples of existing circuit splits ==
The following are examples of existing splits of authority between different circuit courts of appeals:

- The Sixth Circuit and the Tenth Circuit disagree with regard to whether police may seize an individual, without a warrant, based solely on the officers' reasonable suspicion that the individual being seized committed a misdemeanor.
- The Third Circuit, Fifth Circuit, and Ninth Circuit disagree with regard to whether the "special needs" exception permits warrantless strip searches of juveniles.
- The Fifth Circuit and the Eleventh Circuit disagree with regard to whether prisoners have a reasonable expectation of privacy for correspondence with their attorney.
- The First Circuit and the Fifth Circuit disagree with regard to the appellate standard of review for a trial court's determination of the scope of defendant's consent to search.

== See also ==
- List of United States courts of appeals cases
- State supreme court
- Judicial appointment history for United States federal courts
- Plurality decision
