= Kassel-Rothwesten Airfield =

Former military airfield in Rothwesten, Germany

Kassel-Rothwesten Airfield Advanced Landing Ground (ALG) R-12 Fliegerhorst Kassel Fritz-Erler-Kaserne
- Hesse, Germany

Site information
- Type: Military airfield

Location
- Kassel-Rothwesten Airfield (Germany)
- Coordinates: 51°23′25″N 009°32′03″E

Site history
- Built: 1934/35
- Built by: Luftwaffe
- In use: 1939–1945 (Luftwaffe); 1945–1946 (United States Army Air Forces); 1946–1972 (United States Army); 1973–2008 (Bundeswehr)

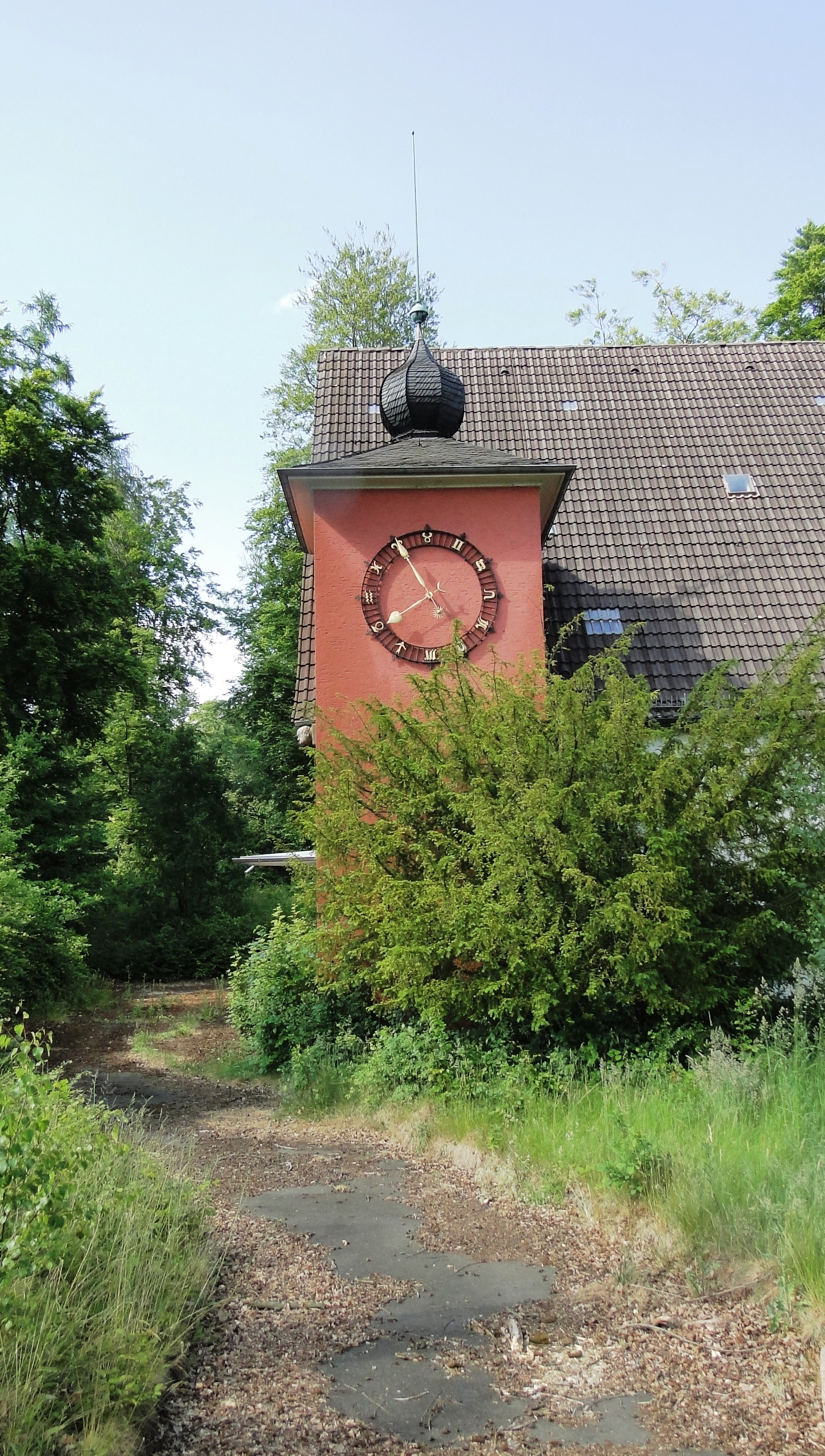
Building of the former Fritz Erler Kaserne/Airfield Rothwesten, 2015

Kassel-Rothwesten Airfield is a former military airfield located in Rothwesten, a part of Fuldatal in Germany about 5 miles (8.0 km) north-northeast of Kassel (Hessen); approximately 240 miles (390 km) southwest of Berlin.

Then known as Fliegerhorst Kassel, the facility was used during World War II by the German Luftwaffe as a combat airfield. It was seized in early April 1945 by the United States Army and used as a Ninth Air Force combat airfield until the end of the war in Europe. After the war "Kassel Air Depot" was established at the airfield, before being closed in September 1946. United States Army units remained at Rothwesten Kaserne until it was closed in 1959.

In the spring of 1948, the barracks were the setting of the "Conclave of Rothwesten", in which the introduction of the Deutsche Mark was prepared.

From 1973 to 2008, the facility was used by the Bundeswehr. After the military left, the airfield and barracks were converted to civilian use, including a photovoltaic power station and a business park. In 2015, the area began to be used as a facility for housing refugees.

== History ==
Kassel-Rothwesten was built in 1935 by the Luftwaffe. A grass runway was constructed which was 600 meters wide and 800 meters long. Later it was extended to 1000 meters. On the east side of the runway the technical buildings were set slightly into the hills. Among them was a wharf, a maintenance building and an engine testing building. Additionally there were three large hangars; later two more were added. Then there was a command post and a building for the aerial photographic service. In the middle stood the control tower.

The first buildings at the airfield were put into service on 1 May 1935. In December 1935 the first pupils arrived for the new flying school which had been established there, and by mid 1939 the Fliegerstab Rothwesten was completed and at war strength, hosting a reconnaissance group taking photographs over Poland, France, Belgium, and the Netherlands.

=== World War II use ===
During the war, Rothwesten was of less strategic importance. The new planes could not use it. The runway was too short, and it was not concrete. Nevertheless, parts of the maintenance crew stayed behind to serve the flying school which still had its facilities there. The most important task for the base was as a service center for night fighters. Aircraft that had to refuel during battle could land there, and minor repairs could be made. It was not a real combat airfield, and played a minor role during the war.

As a result of having been built with very deep foundations, some buildings could be equipped with basements, and some even with a sub-basement. These were used to store all kinds of things. They were not used as bomb shelters, for the walls were not thick enough. However, there was a "Bierkeller," a canteen for officers from the base, with murals on the walls. It remained in use at the base, which became a Bundeswehr barracks, until the site was closed down in 2007. Behind the Bierkeller was an arched gallery which was closed with concrete by the Americans after the war.

There was also a junior officers' mess. Beneath this cellar was a bowling alley. Next to the mess stood the officers' houses, which were built on small hills. They were connected with one another by wooden foot bridges which led over the airbase roads. Other buildings (mostly barracks) stood in the middle of the woods.

For the soldiers and Luftwaffe men, who were used to old, grey buildings, it was like a resort. In its day it was one of the most modern and best-equipped Luftwaffe bases: it had a swimming pool, hospital, gas station for private cars, barber shop, post office, and other facilities.

From 1944 until April 1945, the remaining larger buildings of Rothwesten were used by Fieseler aircraft industries as a small production line for planes. According to eyewitness reports, most were Messerschmitt Bf 109 fighters of the later types (probably G versions and perhaps a few Ks). Also during the winter of 1943/1944, there was possibly a very small production line for the Junkers Ju 87D.

Spare parts for these machines were eventually stored in some of the basements, but by March/April 1945 production stopped as supplies ran out. Orders were issued to dismantle the production line. This work was about 90% complete when the war ended. The unfinished wings and fuselages had already been moved to an unknown place.

=== USAAF use ===
The United States Army Air Forces (USAAF) took over the base on 7 April 1945 and engineers from the IX Engineering Command inspected every corner above and underground. Every door was carefully examined; there was still a chance that some booby-traps might be found. After inspection, they sealed (welded) all doors of cellars that were not going to be used. Generally those doors were found in the few sub-basements. Once confirmed suitable for operational use, the airfield was designated as Advanced Landing Ground "R12" Kassel/Rothwesten.

A 5000' Pierced Steel Planing runway was laid down for combat aircraft and on 17 April, the Ninth Air Force 48th Fighter Group moved in with P-47 Thunderbolts and commenced combat operations. The 48th moved out in a few days, and was replaced by the 36th Fighter Group on 21 April and continued operations from the airfield until the German Capitulation on 7 May.

After V-E Day, the airfield was redesignated as Army Air Force Station Kassel/Rothwesten and was used as an occupation garrison by the USAAF. In addition, the Air Technical Service Command arrived and established "Kassel Air Depot" whose mission was to maintain and service the combat aircraft remaining operational in Germany. The 36th Fighter Group remained until November 1945, and ATSC became the main organization at the facility. In September 1946, the USAAF was consolidating its forces in the Munich area, and the facility was turned over to United States Army personnel of the 1st Constabulary Regiment.

=== United States Army ===
Under Army control, the facility was incorporated into the Rothwesten Kaserne and was used primarily as an intelligence facility.

During the Cold War the 319th Army Security Agency (ASA) Battalion was responsible for an area that stretched from the Baltic Sea to Southern Germany and from near the Dutch border to the East–West German border. The 319th Battalion had Company level units at various locations throughout Germany. The 319th Battalion comprised the 182nd USASA Company and the 184th USASA Company. The ASA unit at Rothwesten was a main intercept and MARBURG-equipped special identification techniques (SIT) site during the Cold War.

It was also a mainstay of the European direction finding (DF) network.

Also on the Kaserne was a battery of Hawk Air Defense Missiles. This was "Charlie" Btry, 6th BN, 517th Arty. Their barracks were directly behind the EM club. Their missiles were deployed on the hill along the long sweeping curved entrance to the Kaserne's main entrance.

=== Rothwesten conclave ===
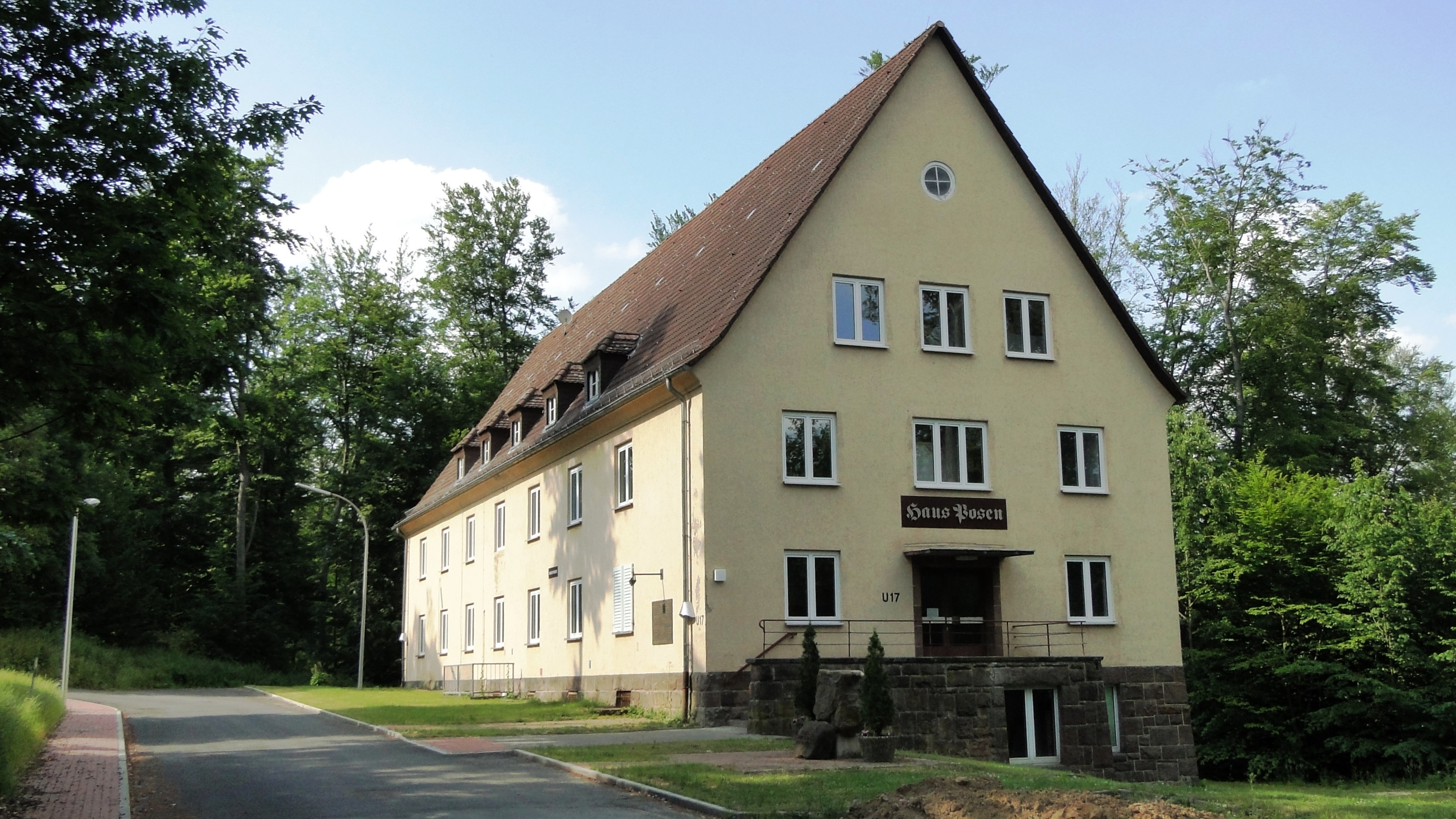
Haus Posen in 2015

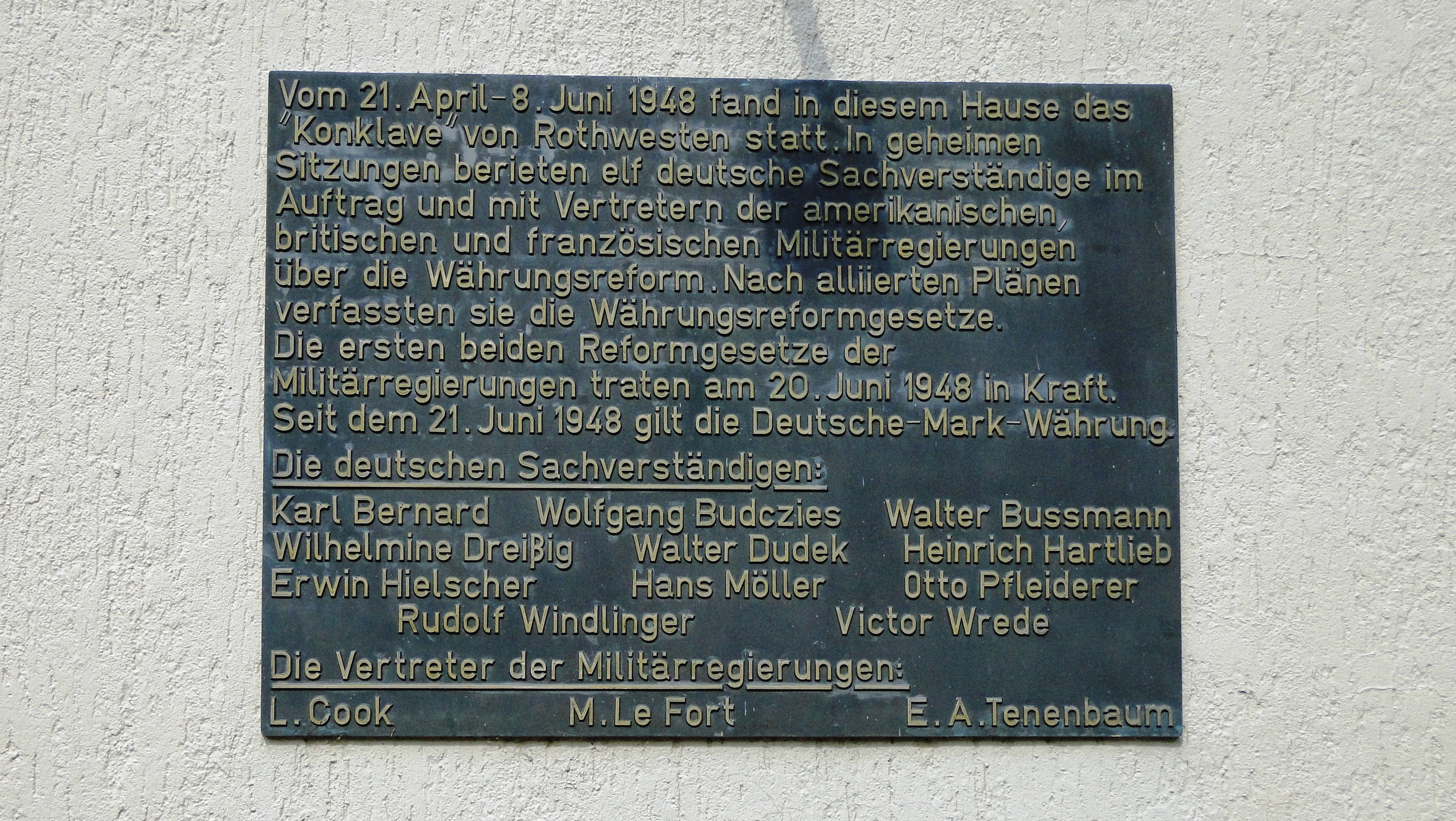
Plaque on Haus Posen on the Rothwesten conclave (in German)

In April 1948, the US occupation authorities assembled a team of 25 German economic experts including later German Chancellor Ludwig Erhard at the Haus Posen inside the facility. Directed by Edward A. Tenenbaum, they were cut off from the rest of the world for seven weeks, and worked on the details of introducing the Deutsche Mark as the new currency of West Germany.

=== Bundeswehr and later use ===
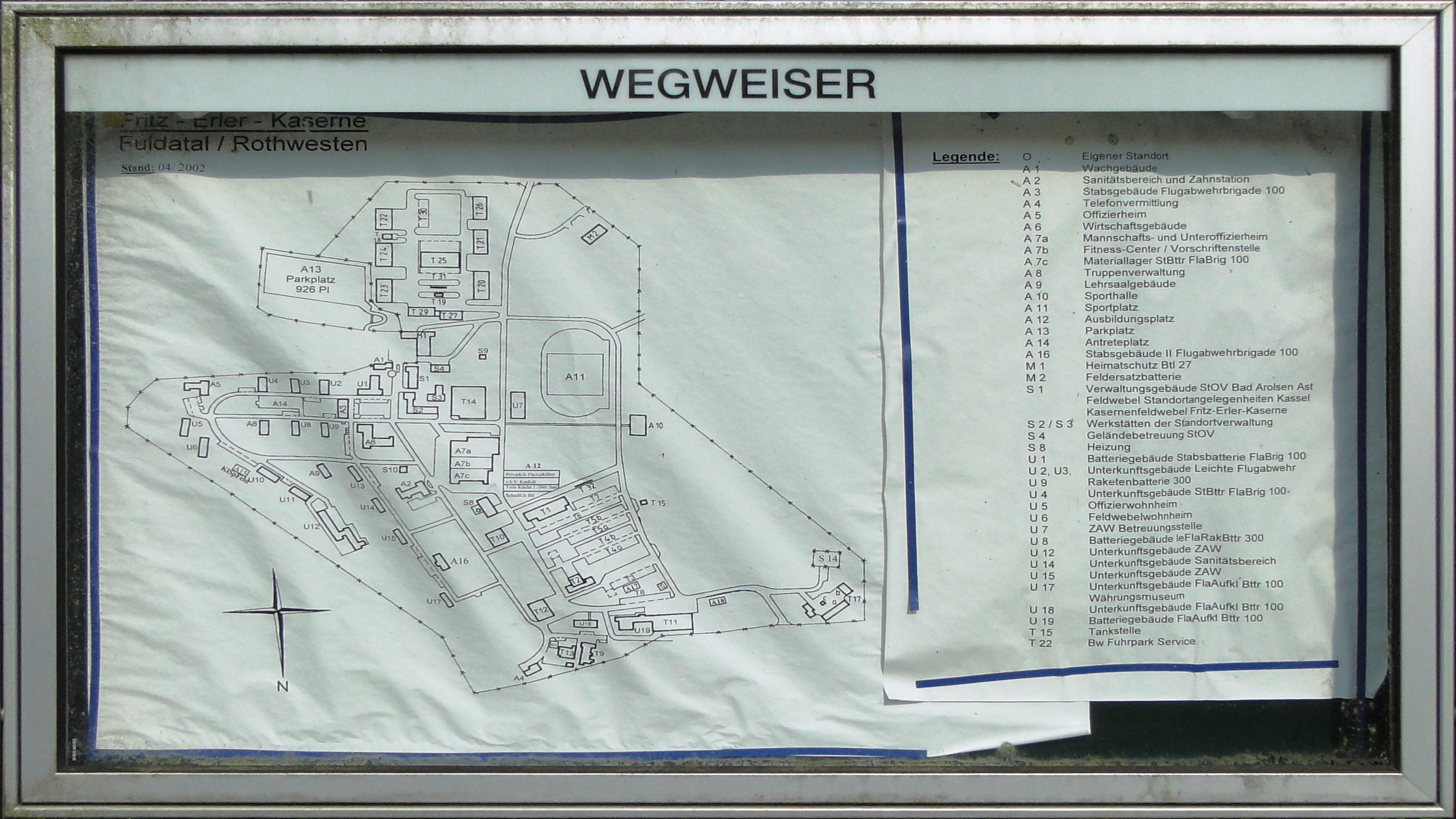
Map of the former Fritz Erler Kaserne in 2015, showing the status as of April 2002

After the US troops left on 1 October 1972, the facility passed to the Bundeswehr in 1973 and in 1975 it was renamed Fritz Erler Kaserne. In March 2008, the staff of Flugabwehrbrigade 100 was dissolved and the barracks were closed. After the German military left, the Bundesanstalt für Immobilienaufgaben (BIMA) took over. The civilian conversion involved the creation of a Gewerbepark Fritz-Erler-Anlage (business park), the former technical facilities of 42 hectares with various old buildings (power station, tank repair shop). Most of the former airfield has been turned into a photovoltaic power station (66 hectares). Around 17 hectares became a nature preserve.

Haus Posen has been turned into a Deutsche Mark museum called Museum Währungsreform 1948. In 2013, BIMA sold the building to the Verein running the museum for the symbolic price of €1.

== Refugee facility ==
In 2015, the State of Hessen rededicated the former barracks as a "camp" for refugees (Erstaufnahmeeinrichtung or facility for initial accommodation). As of February 2016, it houses 170 refugees, mainly from Syria but others come from Iran, Iraq, Afghanistan or Algeria. Work has started to build additional housing in the area. The goal is to accommodate up to 900 refugees.

== See also ==
- Advanced Landing Ground
- European migrant crisis
