= Freedom of conscience =

Freedom to act upon one's beliefs

Freedom of conscience is the freedom of an individual to act upon their moral beliefs. In particular, it often refers to the freedom to not do something one is normally obliged, ordered or expected to do. An individual exercising this freedom may be called a conscientious objector. (Note: The term "conscientious objector" often implies an objection to military service in particular.)

The right to freedom of conscience is recognized by several international conventions, such as the Universal Declaration of Human Rights and the European Convention on Human Rights. It is distinct from but closely related to freedom of thought, freedom of expression and freedom of religion.

== See also ==
- Artistic freedom
- Autonomy
- Cognitive liberty
- Conscience clause (education)
- Conscience clause in medicine in the United States
- Conscientious objection to abortion
- Conscientious objection to military service
- Freethought
- Intellectual freedom
- Liberty
- Political freedom
- Prisoner of conscience
- Vaccine hesitancy and religion
- Vegan school meal
- Whistleblowing

== Bibliography ==
- Leonard M. Hammer (2017). The International Human Right to Freedom of Conscience. Routledge, Taylor & Francis. ISBN 9781138734227.
- Jacelyn Maclure; Charles Taylor (2011). Secularism and Freedom of Conscience. Harvard University Press. ISBN 9780674058651.
