= Conscience clause =

Conscience clause or conscientious objection/objector may refer to:

- Conscience clause (education)
- Conscientious objection to abortion
- Conscientious objector (in the military)
- Conscience clause in medicine in the United States
