= Fernando Tesón =

Argentine-American legal scholar

Fernando Tesón is an Argentine-American legal scholar who is known for his contributions to the philosophy of law (especially, the law of humanitarian intervention) and to neoclassical liberal theory. He is the Tobias Simon Eminent Scholar at Florida State University College of Law. His publications include Humanitarian Intervention: An Inquiry into Law and Morality (3rd ed fully revised and updated, Transnational Publishers 2005); Rational Choice and Democratic Deliberation (Cambridge University Press 2006) [with Guido Pincione]; A Philosophy of International Law (Westview Press 1998); and many articles in law, philosophy, and international relations journals and collections of essays. Before entering academia, Professor Tesón was a career diplomat for the Argentina Foreign Ministry in Buenos Aires for four years. He serves as permanent visiting professor, Universidad Torcuato Di Tella, Buenos Aires, Argentina. Tesón is also the founder, director, arranger, and bandoneón player, of Tango Sur, an Argentine tango band.

Since 2012 he has been a member of the Honorary Council of the Argentine Liberal Libertarian Party.

== Noteworthy works ==
- Tesón, Fernando R. (2018). "Part III: The Role of Property and the Market; Ch. 19: Free Trade: A Principle for All Seasons". In Brennan, Jason; van der Vossen, Bas; Schmidtz, David (eds.). The Routledge Handbook of Libertarianism. London and New York: Taylor & Francis Group. pp. 272–282. ISBN 978-0367870591.
