= George Euripides Tragos =

American lawyer

George Euripedes Tragos
- Born: July 15, 1949 (age 77); Chicago, Illinois, U.S.
- Education: The Florida State University College of Law, Juris Doctor
- Occupation: Attorney
- Known for: High profile defense attorney

George Euripedes Tragos (born July 15, 1949) is a criminal defense and personal injury attorney located in Clearwater, Florida. Tragos was born in Chicago, Illinois, and has participated in a number of cases that have received national attention; these include the Terri Schiavo case, a civil suit against Nick Hogan, and the Stephen Coffeen case in which he successfully argued what has been dubbed the "Red Bull defense". He is senior partner at the personal injury law firm Tragos, Sartes & Tragos, PA.

== Notable cases ==
- Terri Schiavo: The Terri Schiavo case, 1990 to 2005, revolved around a dispute over prolonged life support. Michael Schiavo, the husband of Teresa Marie "Terri" Schiavo, wanted to terminate life support for her after doctors determined her to be in a persistent vegetative state. Terri's parents, Robert and Mary Schindler, argued that she was still conscious. On March 29, 2004, the Schindlers were accused of abusing their daughter. George Felos, attorney for Michael Schiavo, alleged that puncture wounds and scratches were found on Terri's arm after a visit by her parents, who were banned from visiting her. George Tragos defended the Schindlers in a hearing to have their visitation rights restored. Police found the charges against the parents to be unsubstantiated.
- Nick Hogan: Hogan, the son of semi-retired professional wrestler Hulk Hogan, was the driver in a car accident in which he crashed into a tree as result of drunk driving and racing, on August 26, 2007. John Graziano, a passenger in the car, received serious brain injuries and is expected to require 24-hour-a-day care for the rest of his life. Tragos represented the family of Graziano in a civil lawsuit that resulted in a non-disclosed settlement to be used for providing Graziano with medical care.
- Kayode Sotonwa: Sotonwa, a doctor referred to low-income patients by the Pinellas County Health and Human Services Department, was accused of sexually assaulting one patient, improperly touching the breast of a second and striking a third too hard on the knee with a reflex mallet. George Tragos defended Sotonwa, who was acquitted of all charges.
- Stephen Coffeen (The "Red Bull Defense"): In 2009, Stephen Coffeen smothered his 83-year-old father with a pillow. Five psychiatrists testified that Stephen Coffeen had become temporarily psychotic after not sleeping and drinking the caffeinated energy drink Red Bull. Coffeen was acquitted by reason of insanity in July 2011.
- Arunya Rouch: Arunya Rouch was an employee at a Publix supermarket. On March 30, 2010, Rouch was fired for threatening her co-worker, Greg Janowski. She returned hours later, killed Janowski, and went inside to kill her managers. She was stopped in a police shoot-out. George Tragos represented her in a plea of insanity, stating that she "wanted to die. She wanted to commit suicide by cop". Rouch was found guilty of premeditated murder and given life imprisonment.

== Earlier career ==
- Staff Analyst for the Finance & Tax Committee of the Florida House of Representatives
- Chief of the Felony and Misdemeanor Divisions of the Florida State Attorney's Office
- Commissioner to the West German Government
- Chief of the Criminal Division of the U.S. Attorney's Office for the Middle District of Florida
- U.S. Government representative in the courts of Switzerland during investigations within France, Switzerland and Austria
- Lead Trial Attorney for the President's Organized Crime Drug Enforcement Task Force
