= Journal of Transnational Law & Policy =

- Discipline: International law
- Language: English
- Edited by: Morgan Palermo

Publication details
- History: 1991-present
- Publisher: Florida State University College of Law (United States)
- Frequency: Annually
- Open access: Yes

Standard abbreviations
- Bluebook: J. Transnat'l L. & Pol'y
- ISO 4: J. Transnatl. Law Policy

Indexing
- ISSN: 1067-8182
- LCCN: 93641906
- OCLC no.: 26210308

Links
- Journal homepage; Online archive

The Journal of Transnational Law & Policy is a law review published by students of the Florida State University College of Law, established in 1991 as a scholarly forum for discussion of legal developments within the international community. Its articles span a variety of topics within the field of international law, including human rights, comparative law, and U.S. foreign policy.

== General information ==
The journal is published by students at the Florida State University College of Law, who may earn journal membership by achieving high grades and writing competition scores, along with completing weeks of specialized extracurricular training in legal research and writing. In addition to managing all aspects of publication, journal members also organize a series of lectures by scholars and authorities in the field, presented annually as the Lillich Lecture Series. As of December 2025, the editor-in-chief was Morgan Palermo.

== Scope ==
The journal shares the philosophy articulated by Philip Jessup, judge of the International Court of Justice, who defined "transnational law" as "all law which regulates actions or events that transcend national frontiers." The term "transnational" is thus expansive; it includes both the international and comparative dimensions of law.
