= Journal of Land Use and Environmental Law =

- Discipline: American law, Environmental law, Urban studies and planning
- Language: English
- Edited by: Annalise Griffin

Publication details
- Former names: Florida State University Journal of Land Use & Environmental Law
- History: 1983–present
- Publisher: Florida State University College of Law

Standard abbreviations
- Bluebook: J. Land Use & Envtl. L.
- ISO 4: J. Land Use Environ. Law

Indexing
- ISSN: 0892-4880
- LCCN: 86641227
- JSTOR: 08924880

Links
- Journal homepage

The Journal of Land Use & Environmental Law is published twice a year at the Florida State University College of Law. Founded in 1983, it is Florida's first and only student publication in the field. The law review ranks among the top environmental and land use law journals based on citations.

The Journal is edited and published entirely by law students at Florida State University College of Law. It is managed by an executive board popularly elected annually by the members.
