= Florida State University Business Review =

Law review

- Discipline: Law
- Language: English
- Edited by: Jordan Mercer

Publication details
- Former name: Business Law Review (2005-2007)
- History: 2000–present
- Publisher: West Publishing (United States)
- Frequency: Annual

Standard abbreviations
- Bluebook: Fla. St. U. Bus. Rev.
- ISO 4: Fla. State Univ. Bus. Rev.

Links
- Journal homepage; Online issue archive; Online membership archive

The Florida State University Business Review (or the Business Review) is a student-run law review published at the Florida State University College of Law. The Business Review's mission is: "Providing a scholarly forum for contemporary legal discourse and to address the issues and concerns transforming the business law community." The Business Review publishes in its annual volume articles by academics and practitioners, as well as notes written by second- and third-year law students.

== History ==
Founded in 2000, the Business Review published its first issue in the summer of 2001. The Business Review was founded by then-third year law students Kenneth Hamner, Amy Avalos, and Brian Barnett. The inaugural issues were funded by a grant through the FSU College of Graduate Students. Although the journal's current and original title is officially the Florida State University Business Review, between 2005 and 2007 the journal was titled the Business Law Review.

== Admissions ==
The Business Review typically selects its staff editors through bi-annual writing competition, held among the Florida State University College of Law students. In addition, admission is offered to students who receive the highest grades in certain legal writing or business law courses. Law students may also be offered admission if they write a note that is accepted for publication in the Business Review. All Business Review members are required to have and maintain minimum grade point average requirements throughout their tenure on the journal.
