= Carlos O. Torano =

American lawyer, chief executive officer, cigar maker

Carlos Octavio Toraño
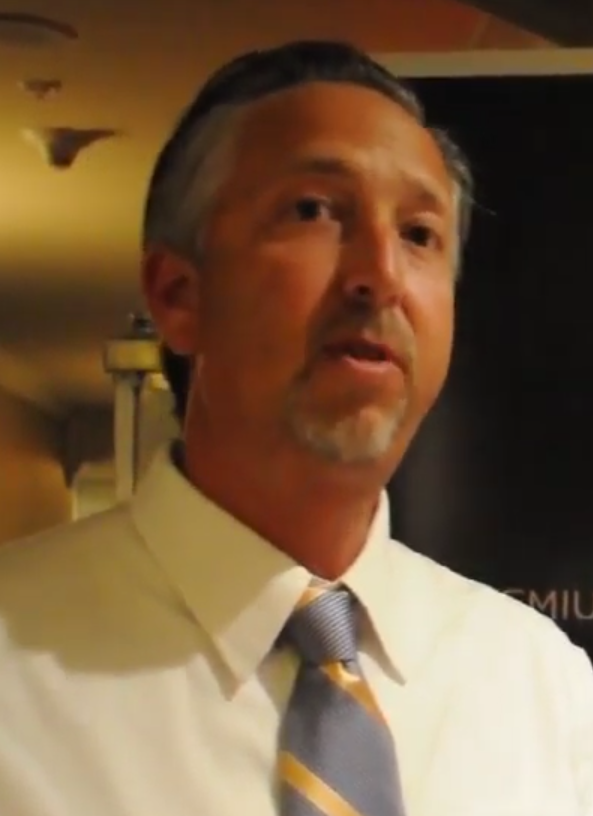
- Born: July 12, 1967 (age 59); Miami, Florida
- Education: B.S., University of Florida, 1985; J.D., Florida State University, 1992
- Known for: President of Toraño Cigars and Central America Tobacco

Carlos Octavio Toraño (born July 12, 1967), nicknamed Charlie Toraño, is a cigar manufacturer and president of both Toraño Cigars and Central America Tobacco.

== Biography ==
Toraño was born in Miami, Florida, and graduated from Christopher Columbus High School, a private Roman Catholic preparatory school located in Miami, in 1985. He attended the University of Florida in Gainesville, Florida, where he was an active member of Pi Kappa Phi fraternity (Alpha Epsilon chapter), and received his bachelor's degree in business administration in 1989. He later went to the Florida State University College of Law in Tallahassee, Florida, and received his J.D. degree in 1992.

Toraño started work as an attorney at the South Florida law firm of Holland & Knight in 1992. In June 1996, he joined his family cigar-manufacturing business as the company vice-president. In June 2005, Toraño became the president of Toraño Cigars, succeeding his father.

== See also ==
- List of Florida State University people
- List of Pi Kappa Phi alumni
- List of University of Florida alumni
