= Jim Bacchus =

American politician

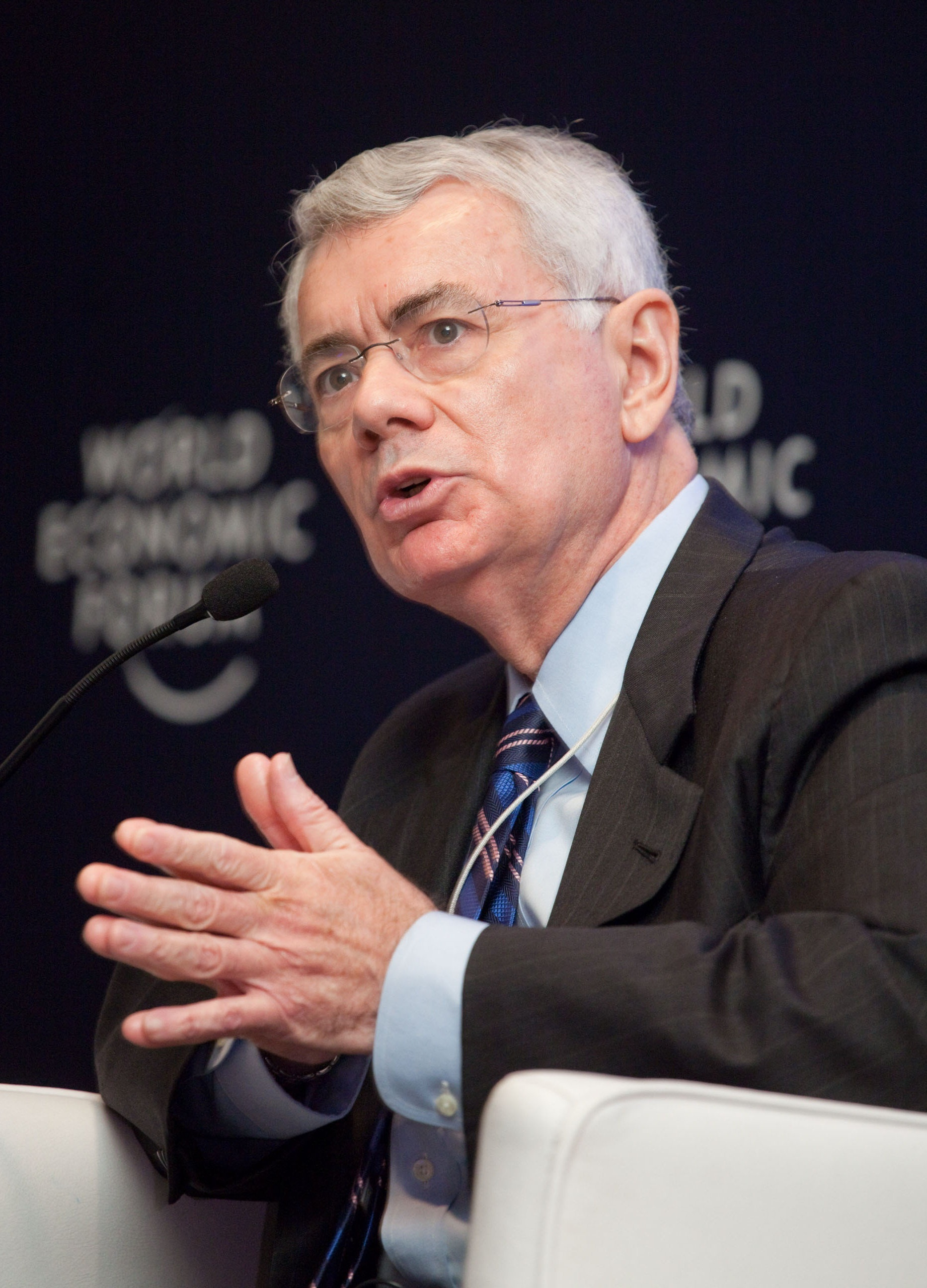

Member of the U.S. House of Representatives from Florida
- In office January 3, 1991 – January 3, 1995
- Preceded by: Bill Nelson
- Succeeded by: Dave Weldon
- Constituency: 11th district (1991–1993); 15th district (1993–1995)

Personal details
- Born: James Leonard Bacchus; June 21, 1949 (age 77) Nashville, Tennessee, U.S.
- Party: Democratic
- Education: Vanderbilt University (BA); Yale University (MA); Florida State University (JD)

Military service
- Branch/service: United States Army
- Years of service: 1971–1977
- Unit: United States Army Reserve; Connecticut National Guard; Florida National Guard

James Leonard Bacchus (born June 21, 1949) is an American statesman, scholar, writer, and politician who served as a member of the United States House of Representatives from the state of Florida from 1991 to 1995. He was a founding member and twice chairman of the Appellate Body of the World Trade Organization in Geneva, Switzerland from 1995 to 2003. In 2024, he received the prestigious global Weeramantry International Justice Award.

== Early life and career ==
Bacchus earned an undergraduate degree from Vanderbilt University, a Master of Arts in History from Yale University, and a Juris Doctor from the Florida State University College of Law, where he was editor-in-chief of the FSU Law Review.

From 1968 to 1973, Bacchus was a reporter and columnist for the Orlando Sentinel in Florida and Washington. From 1964 to 1967, he was a reporter for the Sanford Herald in Florida. He has enlisted service in the United States Army, the United States Army Reserve, the Connecticut National Guard, and the Florida National Guard, 1971-1977. From 1968 to 1973.

Bacchus was Deputy Press Secretary and Chief Speechwriter for Florida Governor Reubin Askew from 1974 to 1976. He became Askew's special assistant from 1979 to 1981, after Askew was appointed U.S. Trade Representative.

He was an attorney and partner with Akerman Senterfitt & Eidson, Orlando in Florida from 1984 to 1990. He was an attorney with Greenberg Traurig, P.A. in Miami, Florida in 1979 and again from 1981 to 1982.

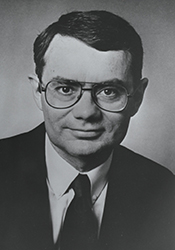
Bacchus while in congress.

== Tenure in Congress ==
In 1990, Bacchus was elected as a member of the Democratic Party to represent Florida's 11th congressional district in the 102nd Congress and the state's 15th congressional district in the 103rd Congress in 1992. His districts included Orlando, Cape Canaveral, and much of East Central Florida.

Bacchus was an active member of Congressional committees on science, space, technology, banking, and other financial services. He also served as a member of the select committee on children. He was a lead sponsor and supporter of the International Space Station, the Space Shuttle, the successful repair mission to the Hubble Space Telescope, and numerous other legislative initiatives involving public and private space exploration.

Bacchus was the original co-sponsor of the implementing legislation for the Uruguay Round of multilateral trade agreements establishing the World Trade Organization and leading supporter of numerous other trade initiatives, including the North American Free Trade Agreement and normal trade relations with China.

== Career after Congress ==
Bacchus was a founding member and twice chairman of the Appellate Body of the World Trade Organization in Geneva, Switzerland, from 1995 to 2003. The WTO dispute settlement system resolves international disputes involving more than 98% of all world commerce. Bacchus was nominated on a bipartisan basis by the United States and twice appointed to the Appellate Body by consensus of the now 164 countries that are members of the WTO. Bacchus served eight years as a founding judge, the only American judge, and was one of the seven judges worldwide. He was twice elected as Chairman in 2002 and 2003. He helped establish the Appellate Body as a leading global tribunal and the WTO dispute settlement system as a leading framework for resolving international disputes and upholding the international rule of law.

Bacchus was Chair of the Global Practice of Greenberg Traurig, P.A. with offices in Orlando, Florida, and Washington, D.C., from 2004 to 2017. He currently serves as a Distinguished University Professor of Global Affairs and Director of the Center for Global Economic and Environmental Opportunity at the University of Central Florida.

On February 23, 2007, Bacchus was named to a Department of Defense panel reviewing the Walter Reed Army Medical Center neglect scandal.

=== Writings ===
Bacchus is the author of the books:

- Trade and Freedom (Cameron May, 2004)
- The Willing World: Shaping and Sharing a Sustainable Global Prosperity (Cambridge University Press, 2018)
- The Development Dimension: Special and Differential Treatment in Trade, with co-author Inu Manak (Routledge Press, 2021)
- Trade Links: New Rules for a New World (Cambridge University Press, 2022)
- Truth About Trade: Reflections on International Trade and Law (World Scientific Publishing, 2023)
- Democracy for a Sustainable World: The Path from the Pnyx (Cambridge University Press, 2025)

=== Other professional activities ===
Bacchus was a member of the High Level Advisory Panel to the President of the Conference of Parties of the United Nations Framework Convention on Climate Change from 2014 to 2016. He has served as Chairman of the Commission on Trade and Investment Policy of the Paris-based International Chamber of Commerce since 2012. He has been a “B20” business adviser to the “G20” heads of state on the international economy, since 2014. He served as Chair of the Global Agenda Council on Governance for Sustainability of the Davos-based World Economic Forum from 2012 to 2014. He was a member of the Global Future Council on Trade and Foreign Direct Investment of the World Economic Forum from 2011 to 2012 and since 2014. He was a member of the Board of Directors of the “E15” Initiative and chair of the global expert group on trade and climate change for the Geneva-based International Center for Trade and Sustainable Development from 2014 to 2015. He has been a member of the Bretton Woods Committee since 1995, and elected life member of the Council on Foreign Relations since 1995. He has been a member of the list of arbitration chairpersons under the CARIFORUM Economic Partnership Agreement between the European Union and the Caribbean CARIFORUM states since 2016.

== Electoral history ==
Florida 11th District U.S. House of Representatives election 1990
Party	Candidate	Votes	%	±%
Democratic	Jim Bacchus	120,991	51.9	
Republican	Bill Tolley	111,970	48.1	

Florida 15th District U.S. House of Representatives election 1992
Party	Candidate	Votes	%	±%
Democratic	Jim Bacchus	132,412	50.7	
Republican	Bill Tolley	128,873	49.3	

U.S. House of Representatives
Preceded by Bill Nelson	Member of the U.S. House of Representatives from Florida's 11th congressional district 1991–1993	Succeeded by Sam Gibbons
Preceded by Clay Shaw	Member of the U.S. House of Representatives from Florida's 15th congressional district 1993–1995	Succeeded by Dave Weldon
U.S. order of precedence (ceremonial)
Preceded by Craig James as Former U.S. Representative	Order of precedence of the United States as Former U.S. Representative	Succeeded by Katherine Harris as Former U.S. Representative
