= Joseph M. Dodge =

Joseph M. Dodge is an American academic who is a leading authority on United States tax law. He is Stearns Weaver Miller Weissler Alhadeff & Sitterson Professor at Florida State University College of Law, and previously served as a faculty member at the University of Texas Law School. He has authored numerous influential articles and several books, including The Logic of Tax (West, 1989) and Federal Income Taxation: Doctrine, Structure and Policy (Michie, 1995) (co-author). He has also taught at UCLA and the University of Utah.

Dodge received B.A. and LL.B. degrees from Harvard University in 1963 and 1967, respectively. He received an LL.M. from New York University in 1973.
