= Wayne Logan =

American legal scholar

Wayne A. Logan is a Teaching Professor at Wake Forest University School of Law. Logan was formerly the Steven M. Goldstein Professor of Law at Florida State University College of Law. Logan teaches and writes in the areas of criminal law, criminal procedure, and sentencing. He is the author or co-author of several books, including The Ex Post Facto Clause: Its History and Role in a Punitive Society (Oxford University Press, 2022), Sentencing Law, Policy, and Practice (Foundation Press, 2022) (with Michael O’Hear), and Knowledge as Power: A History of Criminal Registration Laws in America (Stanford University Press, 2009). He is also the author of several dozen book chapters and law review articles, with work appearing in such publications as the Georgetown Law Journal, the Michigan Law Review, the Notre Dame Law Review, the Pennsylvania Law Review, the Texas Law Review, and the Vanderbilt Law Review. His scholarship has been cited by the U.S. Supreme Court on two occasions, and he is commonly quoted in national media outlets, including the A.B.A. Journal, The New York Times, USA Today, and The Wall Street Journal. Professor Logan is an elected member of the American Law Institute (since 2003) and a past chair of the Criminal Justice Section of the Association of American Law Schools. He has taught for over two decades, the last fifteen years at FSU Law, and is the recipient of an FSU Teaching Award.
