= Mark E. Kaplan =

American politician

Mark Eric Kaplan (born November 30, 1967, in Philadelphia, Pennsylvania) is a member of the Republican Party of the U.S. state of Florida and served as Chief of Staff to Governor Jeb Bush. Previously he served in a similar capacity for Lt. Governor Toni Jennings. Kaplan received his bachelor's degree in political science from the University of Florida in 1988 and a Juris Doctor from Florida State University in 1992.
