= Tim Howard (attorney) =

Disbarred from practicing law as of 03/24/2022

- Born: Philip Timothy Howard; March 7, 1961 (age 65); Tallahassee, Florida
- Education: Florida State University (B.A., J.D.); Northeastern University (PhD)
- Occupations: Professor, Lawyer (Disbarred)
- Parent(s): Phil Howard; Joyce Howard

Philip Timothy Howard (born March 7, 1961) is a Florida attorney who was disbarred by the Florida Supreme Court by Order issued March 24, 2022, accepting the Referee’s Report that found Howard had committed nine of the ten violations of the Code of Professional Responsibility charged against Howard by The Florida Bar. His private law practice, Howard & Associates, P.A., was permanently closed by order of the Florida Supreme Court in its March 24, 2022, order of disbarment.

== Indictment and conviction ==
In December 2022 Howard was indicted by a federal grand jury on one count of racketeering for allegedly engaging in wire fraud and money laundering in relation to both his investment companies and law firm.

Court documents reflect that, between December 2015 and January 2018, Howard, along with his Tallahassee law firm, engaged in a criminal enterprise to defraud his clients of funds from an NFL class-action lawsuit. Howard pleaded guilty to racketeering, and in November 2023, he was sentenced by U.S. District Judge Allen Winsor to 14 years in federal prison, followed by three years of supervised release, and ordered to pay restitution in the amount of $12.64 million.

He is the former director of the College of Professional Studies' Doctorate Program in Law & Policy at Northeastern University. He is a former assistant attorney general of Florida and nominee for United States Attorney for the Northern District of Florida.

== Education ==
In 2005 Howard received his Ph.D. from Northeastern University in law, policy & society after defending his thesis "We've Been Framed!: Progressive Cause Lawyer Leadership in Florida Tobacco Liability Litigation." He received his Juris Doctor from Florida State University in 1986 and was admitted to the bar in 1987. He received his Bachelor of Arts, Cum Laude, in Government, with minors in history, law & society, and Spanish, from Florida State University in 1983. He is a former health law scholar and instructor in constitutional law, civil liberties, judicial process, and media & politics at Boston University.

== Litigation ==
=== Florida tobacco litigation ===
Howard was one of the five original creators of Florida's Medicaid Third Party Liability Law, that created the foundation for the largest civil case settlement in the nation's history.

== Academic Articles ==
Howard has published several articles on cause lawyers, culture, and social movements, and has made annual presentations before the Law & Society Association. His most recent article, "Cause Lawyers at the Constructive Edge: 'A Band of Brothers Defeats Big Tobacco'" was included in The Cultural Lives of Cause Lawyers, a book published by Cambridge University Press in early 2008.

== Academic career ==
From 2005 to 2006 he was a Visiting Scholar & Instructor at Boston University School of Law and Public Health. From 2006 to 2012 he was a professor and later Director of the Doctorate Program in Law & Policy at Northeastern University.

Since 2011 he has served as the President of Cambridge Graduate University International in Florida and Massachusetts.

== Indictment ==
In December 2022 Howard was indicted by a federal grand jury on one count of racketeering for allegedly engaging in wire fraud and money laundering in relation to both his investment companies and law firm.
