= Donald J. Weidner =

American legal scholar

- Born: June 15, 1945 (age 81); United States
- Education: University of Texas
- Known for: Being the Dean of the Florida State University College of Law
- Scientific career
- Fields: Legal
- Workplaces: Florida State University

Donald J. Weidner is Dean and Professor Emeritus at Florida State University College of Law.

== Career ==
He served as dean from 1991 to 2016 and was one of the longest sitting law school deans in the U.S. He received his J.D. from the University of Texas School of Law. Dean Weidner is a leading scholar on partnerships, limited liability companies and fiduciary duties. In 2011, he was named one of nine Transformative Law Deans of the Last Decade by The Leiter Report.

He has served as a visiting professor at the law schools of the University of Texas, University of New Mexico, Stanford University and the University of North Carolina, and worked at the New York firm of Willkie Farr & Gallagher. He is co-author of The Revised Uniform Partnership Act (West Group, 2023-24), a member of the American Law Institute, and served as the Reporter for the Revised Uniform Partnership Act. He was appointed to the Uniform Law Commission by Florida Governor Rick Scott in 2011 and reappointed in 2015. He also serves as a mediator and arbitrator with O'Steen & O'Steen and is an arbitrator with the American Arbitration Association.
