= Skip Horack =

American writer (born 1976)

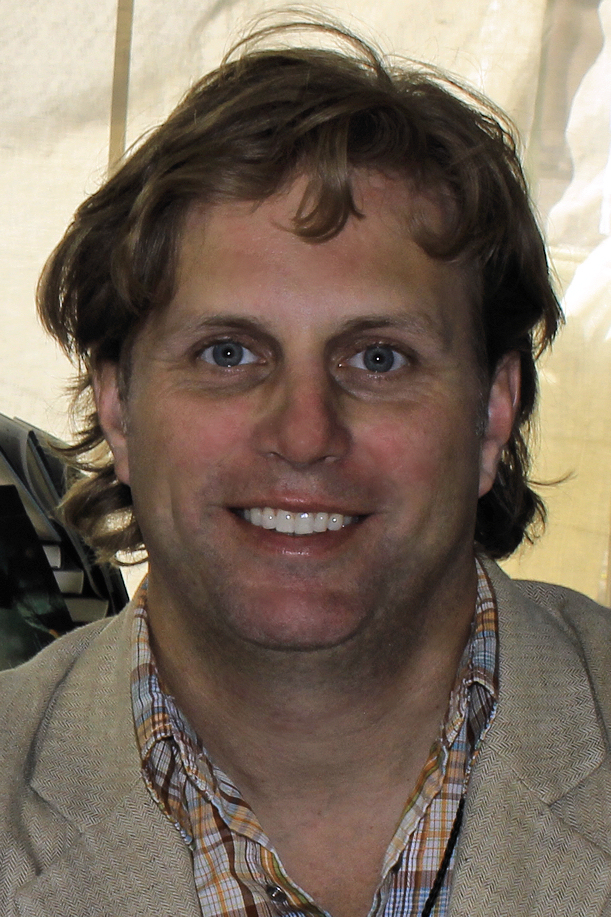
- Horack at the 2015 Texas Book Festival
- Born: Bruce Maclachlan Horack, Jr. May 24, 1976 (age 50); New Orleans, Louisiana
- Occupations: Author, professor
- Writing career
- Genre: Fiction
- Notable works: The Southern Cross (2009); The Eden Hunter (2010); The Other Joseph (2015)

Bruce Maclachlan "Skip" Horack, Jr. (born May 24, 1976) is an American writer.

== Life and career ==
He was raised in Covington, Louisiana where he attended St. Paul's School.

Horack holds a B.A. in English and a J.D. from Florida State University. He worked as a lawyer for five years in Baton Rouge, Louisiana before committing fully to writing and teaching.

He is a former Stegner Fellow and Jones Lecturer at Stanford University, and is currently an associate professor at Florida State University.

His story collection The Southern Cross, which won the Bread Loaf Writers' Conference Bakeless Prize, was published in 2009 by Mariner Books. The contest was judged by Antonya Nelson, who called the story collection "a knockout winner." Hailed as a "storyteller of uncommon talent," Horack's stories are "artfully evoked and deeply felt" and depict characters that are "vital, funny, and heartbreakingly human."

His novel The Eden Hunter was published in August 2010 by Counterpoint and was a New York Times Book Review Editors' Choice. Reviewer Sven Birkerts noted: "Horack, the author of a well-received story collection, The Southern Cross, writes luminous, clean prose....He has a poet’s tuned attentiveness, but never uses his sentences to preen."

His novel The Other Joseph was published in March 2015 by Ecco. Publishers Weekly called it an "exciting, well-plotted sophomore novel" that "delivers satisfying plot turns."

Horack's fiction and nonfiction has also appeared in Oxford American, The Southeast Review, New Delta Review, Louisiana Literature, The Southern Review, StoryQuarterly, Epoch, Narrative Magazine, and elsewhere.
