= Fuldatal =

- Municipality
- Coat of arms

- Location of Fuldatal within Kassel district
- Interactive map of Fuldatal
- Location within Germany Location within Hesse
- Coordinates: 51°23′N 09°33′E
- Country: Germany
- State: Hesse
- Admin. region: Kassel
- District: Kassel

Government
  - Mayor (2024–30): Tore Florin (CDU)

Area
  - Total: 33.68 km^{2} (13.00 sq mi)
- Elevation: 176 m (577 ft)

Population (2025-12-31)
  - Total: 12,714
  - Density: 377.5/km^{2} (977.7/sq mi)
- Time zone: UTC+01:00 (CET)
  - Summer (DST): UTC+02:00 (CEST)
- Postal codes: 34233
- Dialling codes: 0561, 05607, 05541
- Vehicle registration: KS
- Website: www.fuldatal.de

Fuldatal is a municipality in the district of Kassel, in Hesse, Germany. It is situated along the Fulda River, 5 km northeast of Kassel.

Kassel-Rothwesten Airfield, a former military airbase and barracks, is located in Fuldatal.
