= Stephen MacNamara =

Stephen R. MacNamara (born April 15, 1953, in Philadelphia, Pennsylvania) is a former chief of staff to Florida's House Speaker, the Florida Senate President and the governor of the State of Florida. He has also been an associate vice president for academic affairs at Florida State University in Tallahassee, Florida, and director for the Claude Pepper Foundation.

In 1975, MacNamara received a BS in journalism from the University of Florida in Gainesville, Florida, where he was a member of the Gamma Theta chapter of the Sigma Chi fraternity. In 1982, MacNamara received a JD from Florida State University. During the 1999 legislative session, MacNamara served as the first professor in residence for the Florida House of Representatives. MacNamara served as chief of staff for the Florida House under Speaker John Thrasher and has worked with members of the U.S. House of Representatives and served as a special assistant to a U.S. Senator. He was also a special assistant to the Florida Senate in 1982, primarily involved in reapportionment, and served for a short period in 1992 as the federal government's Florida expert in that area. MacNamara was appointed Secretary of the Florida Department of Business and Professional Regulation under Governor Bob Martinez and succeeded Governor Lawton Chiles as the director of the Collins Center for Public Policy. He has worked with or for nine Florida governors and served for three years as the associate dean of the Florida State University College of Law.

MacNamara was the general counsel and media consultant to No Casinos, Inc., founding president of the Coalition for Family Safety and founding president of the Florida Association of Health Plans. For eight years, MacNamara also assisted the Miami Herald in its annual ranking of the Florida Legislature. He has been actively involved with numerous statewide campaigns over the years.

During the 1999 legislative session, MacNamara was asked to serve as the first "professor in residence" for the Florida House of Representatives and during the 2000 session served in the position of chief of staff for the Florida House under Speaker John Thrasher. Governor Jeb Bush appointed him to the position of chairman of the Governor's Ex-Offenders Task Force to investigate ways for former prisoners to reenter society and make recommendation for changes to the governor and the Florida Legislature. In July 2009, he was named one of the four finalists for the position of chancellor to the State University System.

MacNamara has been the Associate Vice President for academic affairs at Florida State University, past executive director of both the Claude Pepper Center and the Claude Pepper Foundation, and serves as corporate secretary to the Claude Pepper Foundation.

MacNamara is the only person in Florida history to serve as Chief of Staff to Florida's House Speaker, the Florida Senate President, and the Governor of the State of Florida.
