= Edward A. Tenenbaum =

American economist (1921–1975)

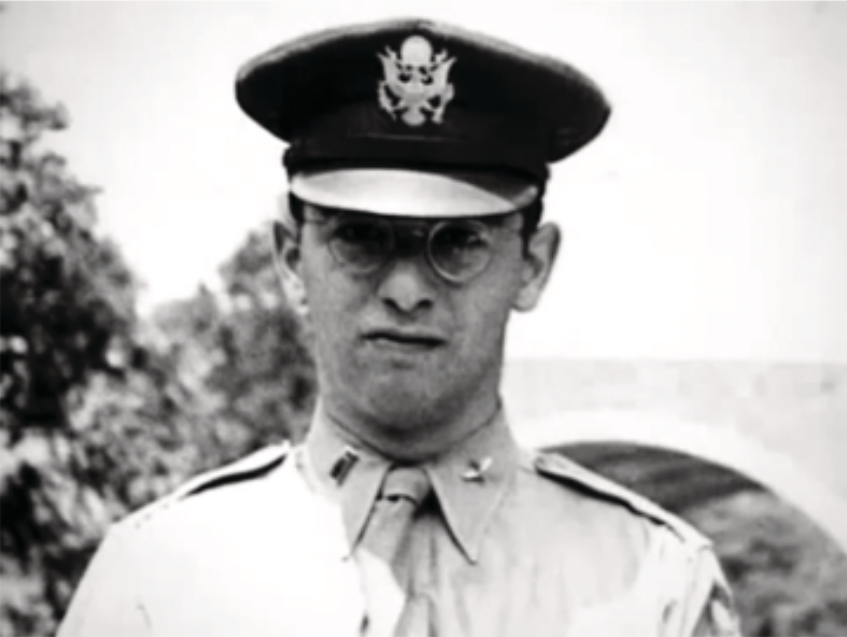

Office of Military Government, United States of Occupied Germany

Personal details
- Born: November 10, 1921 New York City, United States
- Died: October 14, 1975 (aged 53) Harrisburg, Pennsylvania
- Resting place: Arlington National Cemetery

Military service
- Branch/service: United States Army; Office of Strategic Services Enemy Objectives Unit
- Battles/wars: World War II

Edward Adam Tenenbaum (1921–1975) was an American economist, sometimes referred to in Germany as "Vater der Deutschen Mark" (father of the Deutsche Mark).

== Biography ==
Tenenbaum was the son of Polish Jews who emigrated to America. In the late 1930s, he was a student at the International School of Geneva, Switzerland, where he befriended the portrait artist Milein Cosman. He subsequently graduated summa cum laude from Yale University in 1942. He was awarded the Warren Memorial High Scholarship prize for the Bachelor of the Arts candidate ranking highest in scholarship.

Tenenbaum was a US First Lieutenant and intelligence officer with the Publicity and Psychological Warfare unit of the Twelfth Army Group headquarters under General Omar N. Bradley. While in his early 20s, he and civilian Egon W. Fleck were the first two non-captive Allied personnel to enter Buchenwald concentration camp on April 11, 1945, at 5:30 p.m.

After the war, Tenenbaum served as special assistant to Lucius D. Clay, finance adviser of the U.S. military-established government from 1945 to 1948 and as an economist with the Economic Cooperation Administration from 1948 to 1950. He is credited with rescuing the German Deutsche Mark while in this position with the Currency Reform of 1948. Former German chancellor Helmut Schmidt said about Tenenbaum, "He was the intellectual link between the American military government and the German experts."

He was later an economist with the International Monetary Fund from 1950 to 1951. Tenenbaum worked for the Mutual Security Agency as an economic adviser from 1951 to 1952. From 1952 to 1954, he was a finance adviser to the Greek government.

Tenenbaum died in a traffic accident in 1975.
