= John Scholz =

Dr. John T. Scholz is the Francis Eppes Distinguished Professor of Political Science and a Courtesy Professor of Law at Florida State University. As the first political scientist to formulate the "regulation game," which was later extended in influential work on responsive regulation by John Braithwaite and Ian Ayres. Scholz is widely regarded as one of the leading political scientists addressing regulatory enforcement.

Scholz's publications have analyzed government regulatory policies from the federal to the local level involving issues of occupational safety and health, water pollution, and taxation, focusing in particular on enforcement and compliance issues.

Scholz's research analyzes the problems of developing and maintaining cooperative solutions to collective action problems, emphasizing the role of policy networks, private partnerships, and collaborative government programs in resolving collective problems. He is a coauthor of Taxpayer Compliance: An Agenda for Research - A National Academy of Sciences Report (with Jeffrey A. Roth and Ann Dryden Witte), Philadelphia: University of Pennsylvania Press, 1989, and his most recent book is Adaptive Governance and Water Conflict (editor, with Bruce Stiftel), published in 2006 with Resources for the Future.

== Publications ==
=== Articles ===
- “Do Networks Enhance Cooperation? Credibility, Search, and Collaboration” (with Ramiro Berardo and Brad Kile) Journal of Politics, 70(2): 393-406, 2008
- “Cooptation or Transformation? Local Policy Networks and Federal Regulatory Enforcement” (with Cheng-Lung Wang) American Journal of Political Science, 50(1): 81-97, 2006
- “Contractual Compliance and the Federal Income Tax System” Journal of Law and Policy 13:139 – 203, 2003.
- “Building Consensual Institutions: Networks and the National Estuary Program” (with Mark Schneider, Mark Lubell, Denisa Midruta, Matt Edwards) American Journal of Political Science, 47:143-158, 2003
- “Watershed Partnerships and the Emergence of Collective Action Institutions” (with Mark Lubell, Mark Schneider, and Mihriye Mete). American Journal of Political Science 46: 148-163, 2002
- “Cooperation, Reciprocity, and the Collective Action Heuristic” (with Mark Lubell). American Journal of Political Science, 45: 160-178, 2001
- "Social Networks and Citizen Responses to Legal Change" (with Christine Roch and Kathleen McGraw). American Journal of Political Science, 44: 777-791, 2000
- "Equity, Efficiency, and Politics: Democratic Controls on the Tax Collector (with B. Dan Wood) American Journal of Political Science, 43: 1166-1188, 1999
- "Enforcement Policy and Corporate Misconduct: The Changing Perspective of Deterrence Theory" Law and Contemporary Problems, 60:253-268, 1998
- “Adaptive Political Attitudes: Duty, Trust, and Fear as Monitors of Tax Policy” (with Mark Lubell), American Journal of Political Science, 42: 903-920, 1998
- "Trust and Taxpaying: Testing the Heuristic Approach to Collective Action" (with Mark Lubell), American Journal of Political Science, 42: 398-417, 1998
- “Controlling the IRS: Principals, Principles, and Public Administration, (with Dan Wood), American Journal of Political Science, 42:141-162, 1998
- "Can Government Facilitate Cooperation? An Informational Model of OSHA Enforcement" (with Wayne Gray) American Journal of Political Science 41: 693-717, 1997
- "Duty, Fear, and Tax Compliance: The Heuristic Basis of Citizenship Behavior (with Neil Pinney) American Journal of Political Science 39: 490-512, 1995
- "Does Regulatory Enforcement Work? A Panel Analysis of OSHA Enforcement" (With Wayne Gray) Law and Society Review 27: 177- 213, 1993
- "Analyzing the Equity and Efficiency of OSHA Enforcement" (with Wayne Gray). Law and Policy, 13: 185-214, 1992
- "Will Taxpayers Ever Like Taxes? Responses to the 1986 Tax Reform Act" (With Marco Steenbergen and Kathleen McGraw) Journal of Economic Psychology 13:625-656 1992
- "Behavioral Decision Theory and Tax Compliance: Beyond Deterrence" (with Jeff Casey). Law and Society Review, 25: 821-843, 1992
- "Appeals to Civic Virtue versus Attention to Self Interest: Effects on Taxpayer Responses to New Tax Laws" (with Kathleen McGraw). Law and Society Review, 25:471-498, 1991
- "Political Freedom and Political Stability: Nepal's 1991 Parliamentary Elections" (with Fred Gaige). Asian Survey, 31: 1040-1060, 1991
- "Boundary Effects of Vague Risk Information on Taxpayer's Decisions" (with Jeff Casey). Organizational Behavior and Human Decision Processes, 50:360-394, 1991
- "Street-level Political Controls over Federal Bureaucracy" (with Jim Twombly and Barbara Headrick). American Political Science Review, 85: 829-850, 1991
- "Cooperative Regulatory Enforcement and the Politics of Administrative Effectiveness" American Political Science Review, 85: 115-136, 1991
- "OSHA Enforcement and Workplace Injuries: A Behavioral Approach to Risk Assessment" (with Wayne B. Gray). Journal of Risk and Uncertainty, 3: 283-305, 1990
- "Decision Frame and Opportunity as Determinants of Tax Cheating: An International Experimental Study" (with Henry Robbens, Henk Elffers, Dick Hessing, et al.). Journal of Economic Psychology, 11: 341-364, 1990
- "Regulatory Enforcement in a Federalist System," (with Feng-Heng Wei) American Political Science Review, 80: 1249-1270, 1986
- "Coping With Complexity: A Bounded Rationality Perspective on Taxpayer Compliance," Proceedings of the 78th Annual Conference on Taxation, National Tax Association—Tax Institute of America, 1985
- "Voluntary Compliance and Regulatory Enforcement," Law and Policy, 6: 385-405, 1984
- "In Search of Regulatory Alternatives," Journal of Policy Analysis and Management, 4: 113-116, 1984
- "Cooperation, Deterrence, and the Ecology of Regulatory Enforcement," Law and Society Review 18: 179-224, 1984
- "Reliability, Responsiveness and Regulatory Policy," Public Administration Review, 44: 145-153, 1984
- "The Criminology of the Corporation and Regulatory Enforcement Strategies," with Robert A. Kagan, Jahrbuch fur Rechtssoziologie Und Rechttheorie, 7: 352-377, 1981; reprinted in Keith Hawkins and John Thomas, eds, Enforcing Regulation. Hingham, Mass: Kluwer-Nijhoff, pp 67–96, 1984
- "State Regulatory Reform and Federal Regulation," Policy Studies Review, 1: 347-359, 1981
- "Trying to Control the Policy Process: Royal Strategies in " Nepal," with Leo E. Rose, Contributions to Asian Studies, 14: 89-102, 1979
- "Nepal in 1977: Political Discipline or Human Rights," Asian Survey, 18: 135-141, 1978
- "Nepal: Foreign Policy Determinants in a Small State," Asian Thought and Society, 3: 106-109, 1978
- "Nepal in 1976: Problems with India Threaten Birendra's New Order," Asian Survey, 17: 201-207, 1977
- "Elutriation Particle Separator," with D. R. Uhlmann & B. B. Chalmers, Review of Scientific Instruments, 36: 1813-1816, 1965

=== Books ===
- Adaptive Governance and Water Conflicts (edited with Bruce Stiftel) Washington, D.C.: Resources for the Future, 2005
- Adaptive Governance and Water Conflicts: The Case Studies (with Aysin Dedekorkut and Bruce Stiftel, eds.) Tallahassee, FL: Florida State University DeVoe L. Moore Center, 2003
- Taxpayer Compliance: An Agenda for Research A National Academy of Sciences Report (with Jeffrey A. Roth and Ann Dryden Witte). Philadelphia: University of Pennsylvania Press, 1989
- Taxpayer Compliance: Social Science Perspectives (Edited, with Jeffrey A. Roth). Philadelphia: University of Pennsylvania Press, 1989
- Nepal: Profile of a Himalayan Kingdom (with Leo E. Rose). Boulder, Colorado: Westview Press, 1980

=== Chapters in Books ===
- “The Challenges of Adaptive Governance” in John Scholz and Bruce Stiftel, eds. Adaptive Governance and Water Conflicts Washington, D.C.: Resources for the Future, 2005
- “The Future of Adaptive Governance” in John Scholz and Bruce Stiftel, eds. Adaptive Governance and Water Conflicts Washington, D.C.: Resources for the Future, 2005
- “Comments: Carrots or Just Deserts?” Pp 258–266 in The Crisis in Tax Administration. Joel Slemrod and Henry Aaron, eds. Washington, D.C.: Brookings Press. 2004
- “Administrative Justice” (with Robert Howard) in Joseph Sanders and V. Lee Hamilton (eds.) The Justice Reader New York: Plenum. 2001
- “Trusting Government: Fear, Duty, and Trust in Tax Compliance” in Valerie Braithwaite and Margaret Levi (eds.) Trust and Governance New York: Russell Sage Foundation, 1998
- "Managing Regulatory Enforcement in the United States" in David Rosenbloom and Richard Schwartz (eds.) Handbook of Regulation and Administrative Law New York: Marcel Dekker, Inc., 1994
- "Taxpayer Adaptation to the 1986 Tax Reform Act: Do New Laws Affect the Way Taxpayers Think about Taxes?" (with Kathleen McGraw and Marco Steenbergen) in Joel Slemrod, ed., Why People Pay Taxes: Tax Compliance and Enforcement. Ann Arbor: University of Michigan Press, 1992
- "Political Education is Necessary to Foster Cooperative Regulatory Enforcement," in Jay Sigler and Thomas Murphy, eds. Preventing Corporate Lawbreaking: New Approaches to Government-Business Interaction. New York: Praeger/Quorum Books, pp 160–183, 1991
- "Fairness and Compliance: The Impact of Discussion on Taxpayer's Decisions" (with Kathleen McGraw), in IRS, The Impact of Tax Reform Act of 1986 Conference Report. Washington, D.C.: Department of Treasury report 7302 (Rev. 3-90) 1990
- "Compliance Research and the Political Context of Tax Administration," in Jeffrey A. Roth and John T. Scholz, eds., Taxpayer Compliance: Social Science Perspectives. Philadelphia: University of Pennsylvania Press, pp 12–46, 1989
- "Federal vs. State Regulation: Does it Matter?" in Malcolm Feeley and Harry Scheiber, eds., Power Divided: Essays on the Theory and Practice of Federalism. Berkeley: Institute of Governmental Studies, pp 105–122, 1989
- "Norms, Social Commitment, and Citizens Adaptation to New Laws" (with Kathleen McGraw), in Peter J. van Koppen, Dick J. Hessing and Great van den Heuvel, eds., Lawyers on Psychology and Psychologists on Law. Berwyn, PA: Swets North America, pp 101–125, 1988
- "Discretion and Enforcement Efficiency: Problems of Complexity, Contingency and Corruption," in Kenneth Hibbeln and Douglas Shumavon eds. Administrative Discretion and Public Policy Implementation. N.Y.: Praeger, pp. 145–156, 1986
- "Nepal" (with Doss Mabe), in Current History Encyclopedia of Developing Nations. N.Y.: McGraw-Hill, pp. 206–209, 1982
