= Mark Seidenfeld =

American legal academic

Academic background
- Education: Reed College (BA); Brandeis University (MA); Stanford University (JD)

Academic work
- Discipline: Law
- Sub-discipline: Administrative law Law and economics Regulatory law
- Institutions: Florida State University College of Law

Mark B. Seidenfeld is an American legal academic who is known for his contributions to American administrative law. He is the Patricia A. Dore Professor of Administrative Law at the Florida State University College of Law.

== Education ==
Seidenfeld earned a Bachelor of Arts degree in physics from Reed College, a Master of Arts in applied physics from Brandeis University, and a Juris Doctor from Stanford Law School.

== Career ==
Seidenfeld began his career as research physicist and engineer at Intel, After graduating from law school, he served as a law clerk for Judge Patricia Wald and as assistant counsel for the New York Public Service Commission.

Seidenfeld's work focuses on the relationship of administrative law doctrine, especially judicial review of agency action, to the structure of the administrative state. He is also known for proposing civic republicanism as a justification for the administrative state.

Seidenfeld teaches administrative law, Constitutional Law I (Structure of Government), and a required first year course on legislation and regulation. He has also taught numerous courses on particular areas of federal regulation, as well as courses on law and economics.

In addition to his publications on how administrative law doctrine relates to institutional behavior and agency accountability, he is the author of Microeconomic Predicates to Law and Economics (Anderson Pub. Co., 1996).
