= Conscience clause (education) =

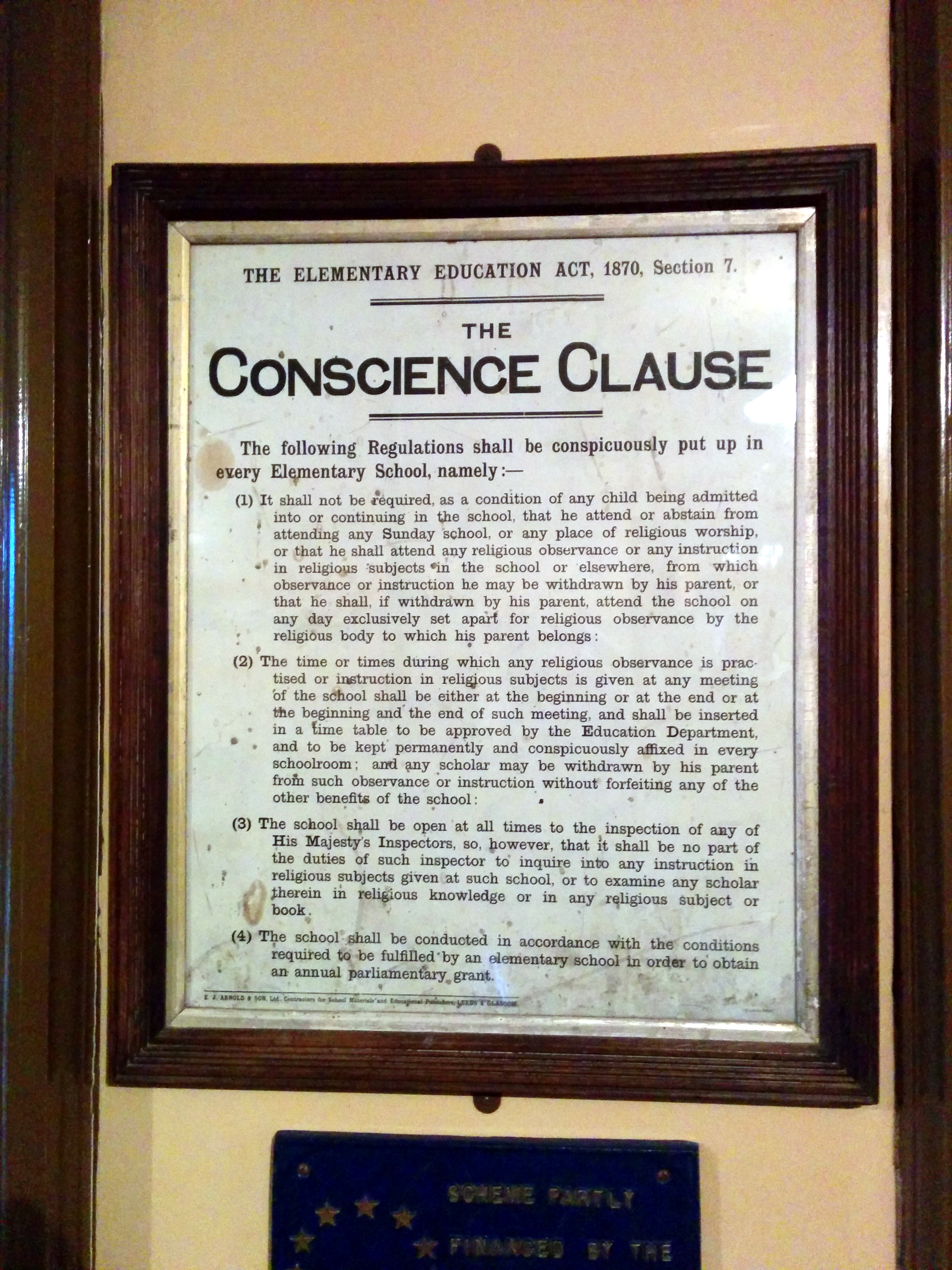
Framed print notice of the conscience clause, hung outside Pit Village, England (2014).

The conscience clause was an important term in education in England throughout much of the 19th century. In this context, it referred to permitting parents of schoolchildren to withdraw them from Church of England worship services or other school activities that violated the parents' religious principles.

== Overview ==
The conscience clause is part of the Elementary Education Act 1870 (33 & 34 Vict. c. 75), which established the neutrality and indifference of the state regarding religious instruction. It was introduced and applied to all State-aided schools to protect the religious liberties of minorities, who were viewed as religious dissidents. The law, which was not applicable to Scotland and Ireland stated that "no religious catechism or religious formularity which is distinctive of any particular denomination shall be taught in the school." The conscience clause did not exempt students from Saturday classes or any other day when their religious creed require attendance. d and that it is composed of diverse interests and influences so it is not bound by the principles of the Church.

Objections to the introduction of the "conscience clause" included those made by the Church of Missionary Society, a section of the Church of England, arguing that this rule will force them to close their schools. Critics refer to it as a "secular intrusion", claiming that it turns education into mere instruction.

== Usage ==
In Scotland, a similar law was passed in 1872. The inclusion of the conscientious clause was a result of a series of public discussions that resulted in the adoption of Bible instruction in primary education while respecting the conscientious objections of parents and guardians.

Similar policy was adopted in some British colonies such as the Leeward Islands, which introduced its own Education Act in 1890. This law reinforced governmental participation in governance of schools that receive public funding but also allowed learners invoking the conscience clause without suffering discrimination in their lessons.

In India, the term became the subject of debate in 1882 after it was raised by a Commission led by K.T. Telang, which recommended that private schools that receive grants from the government adopt it. It was only on 1904 when the conscientious clause was first applied in Travancore.
