= Proenza =

Proenza is a surname. Notable people with the surname include:

- Bill Proenza, an American meteorologist
- Luis M. Proenza (born 1944), an American university president
- Reynaldo Proenza (born 1984), a Cuban shot putter

== See also ==
- Proenza Schouler, an American clothing brand
