= William L. Reed =

William L. Reed may refer to:

- William Reed (English composer) (William Leonard Reed, 1910–2002), English classical composer and pianist
- William L. Reed (politician) (1866–?), served in the Massachusetts House of Representatives

== See also ==
- Bill Read (William L. Read, born 1949 or 1950), American meteorologist
- William Leman Rede, playwright
