= Rick Knabb =

American meteorologist (born 1968)

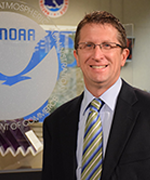

11th Director of the National Hurricane Center
- In office June 4, 2012 – May 12, 2017
- Preceded by: Bill Read
- Succeeded by: Edward Rappaport

Personal details
- Born: June 20, 1968 (age 57) Chicago, Illinois, U.S.
- Education: Purdue University; Florida State University
- Occupation: Meteorologist

Richard Knabb (born June 20, 1968) is an American meteorologist who served as the 11th Director of the National Hurricane Center from June 4, 2012 to May 12, 2017. On March 21, 2017, Knabb announced his return to The Weather Channel as the tropical weather expert which was the position he held from 2010 to 2012.

== Early life and education ==
Knabb was born on June 20, 1968, in Chicago, Illinois, and was raised in suburban Fort Lauderdale, Florida and in the Houston, Texas suburb of Katy. He attended Purdue University earned a bachelor's degree in Atmospheric Science before earning a master's degree and Ph.D. in meteorology from Florida State University.

== Meteorology career ==
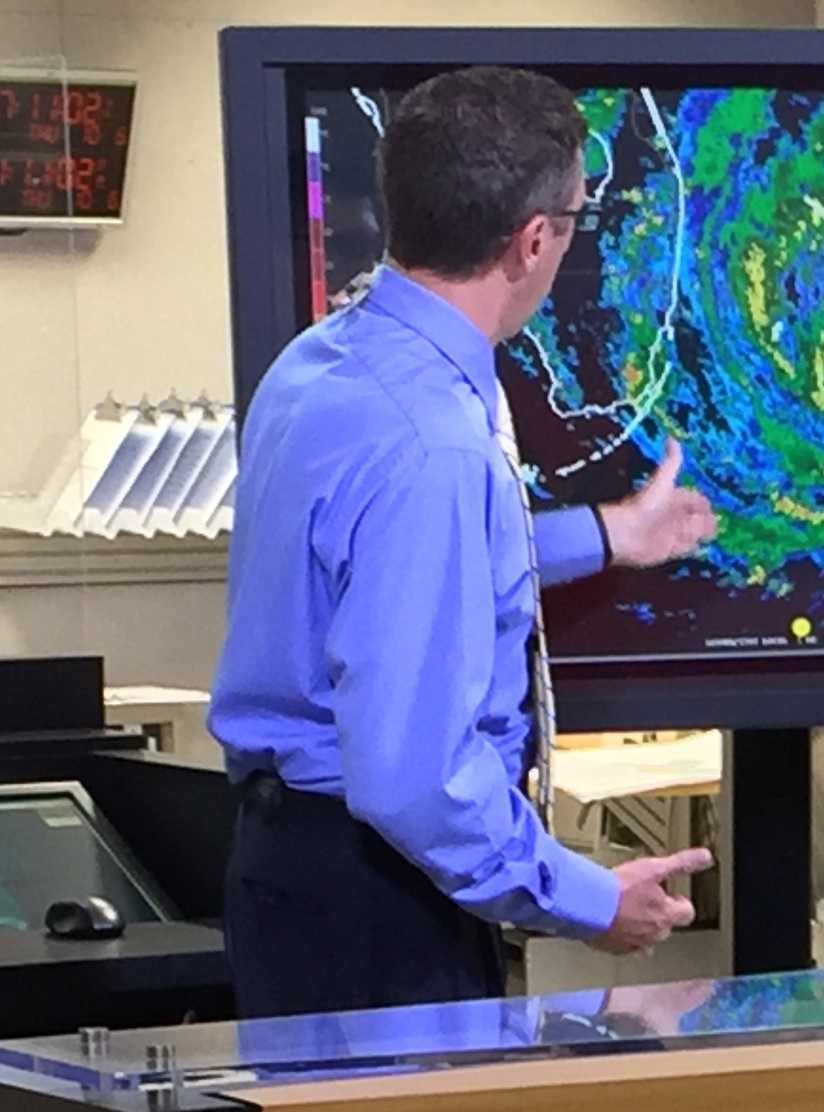
Knabb in 2016

Knabb started working for the NHC in 2001. He served as a Senior Hurricane Specialist from 2005 to 2008. He left the NHC to become deputy director of the Central Pacific Hurricane Center in Hawaii where he stayed until joining The Weather Channel in May 2010 replacing Steve Lyons as tropical weather expert. He was announced as Director of the National Hurricane Center starting June 4, 2012 replacing Bill Read. Knabb returned to the Weather Channel in 2017 and currently serves as their on-air hurricane expert and tropical programming manager.

Preceded by Bill Read	Director of the National Hurricane Center; 2012–2017	Succeeded by Edward Rappaport
