= Edward Rappaport =

American meteorologist (born 1957)

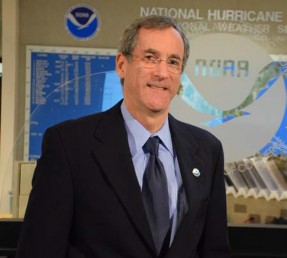
- Born: November 18, 1957 (age 68); Los Angeles, California
- Education: University of Washington; Texas Tech University

Edward Neil "Ed" Rappaport (born November 18, 1957) served as the acting director of the National Hurricane Center from 2007 to 2008 and again from 2017 to 2018. He replaced former director Bill Proenza on July 9, 2007. Rappaport was replaced by Bill Read in 2008. He began serving as acting director again when Richard Knabb left the NHC in 2017 until Kenneth Graham was selected to succeed him in 2018. Rappaport was simultaneously the deputy director from 2000 to his retirement in 2021.

Rappaport joined the NHC in 1987, training as a post-doctoral fellow, then worked on an array of assignments as a research meteorologist starting in 1988. He ascended to assistant hurricane specialist and Tropical Satellite and Analysis Center meteorologist in 1990 before becoming a hurricane specialist in 1993. From 1998 to 2000, he was chief of the Technical Support Branch. Having both operational forecasting and research experience, Rappaport became deputy director in 2000. In November 2006, he declined to be nominated to replace Max Mayfield as director, citing personal reasons. Rappaport earned his B.S. and M.S. in 1979 and 1983, respectively, both from the University of Washington, and earned his Ph.D. in atmospheric science from Texas Tech University in 1988.

Preceded by Bill Proenza	Director of the National Hurricane Center (acting); 2007–2008	Succeeded by Bill Read
Preceded by Richard Knabb	Director of the National Hurricane Center (acting); 2017–2018	Succeeded by Ken Graham
Preceded by Max Mayfield	Deputy Director of the NHC; 2000–2007	Succeeded by Bill Read (acting)
Preceded by Bill Read (acting)	Deputy Director of the NHC; 2008–2017	Succeeded by Jamie Rhome (acting)
Preceded by Jamie Rhome (acting)	Deputy Director of the NHC; 2018–2021	Succeeded by Jamie Rhome
