= Bill Proenza =

American meteorologist (born 1944/45)

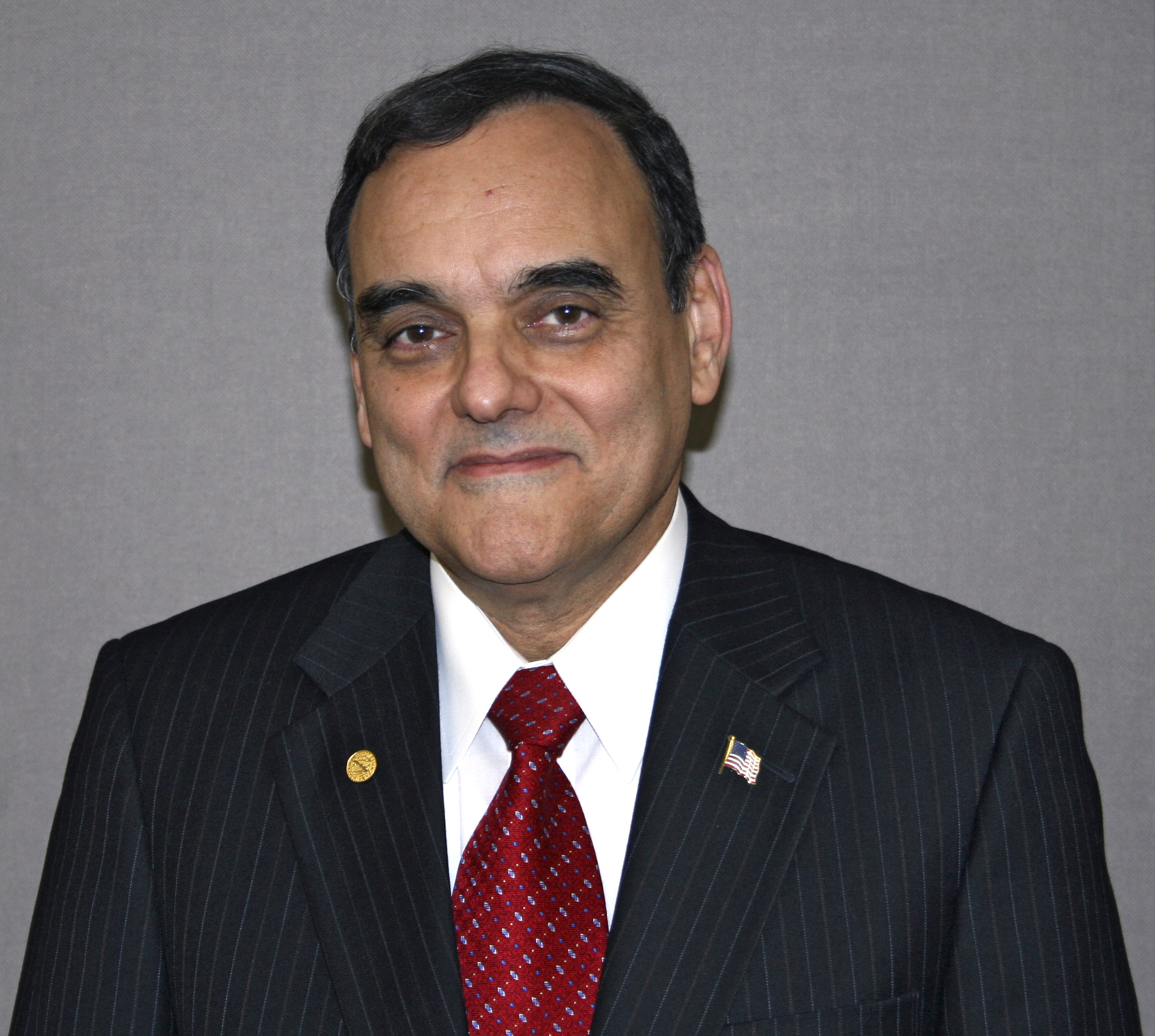
- Born: 1944/45; New York, U.S.
- Education: Florida State University
- Occupation: meteorologist

Xavier William Proenza was the Southern Region Director of the United States National Weather Service from 1999 to 2007 and 2007–2013. He was also previously the director of the National Hurricane Center (NHC) from January 4, 2007 to July 9, 2007.

== History ==
Bill Proenza was born in New York, and raised in Florida. He graduated from Florida State University. He joined the National Hurricane Center in 1963 and 1964, becoming a reconnaissance meteorologist from 1965 through 1967. After working at the National Weather Service field offices in Huntsville, Alabama (1968), Columbus, Georgia (1969), and Atlanta, Georgia (1970), he headed for work at NWS headquarters in Silver Spring, Maryland and Central Region headquarters before working for Southern Region headquarters in the late 1980s as deputy director, a position he served through the 1990s, before becoming its director in 1999. He had a short tenure as National Hurricane Center Director from January to July 2007.

The Former NHC Director returned to the National Weather Service's Southern Region Headquarters in Fort Worth, Texas in late September 2007. He was let go in February 2013 for unauthorized transfer of $528,000 to maintenance of dozens of radar systems across the southern tier of the US and weather service staffing before expected budget cuts to the National Weather Service. He was fired four days after being interviewed for an article in The Washington Post about the cuts, which he claimed could limit radar use during critical weather events.

== Tenure at NHC ==
Proenza had a rocky tenure as the chief of the NHC – "a brief but turbulent tenure in which he publicly criticized his bosses and then lost the support of much of his staff."

In May 2007, he publicly accused NOAA of wasting money, specifically citing NOAA's plans to spend $4 million to publicize a 200th anniversary celebration while the agency has cut $700,000 from hurricane research. In its defense "NOAA spokesman Anson Franklin said the agency is actually only spending about $1.5 million on the campaign over two years. He said it is justified to publicize the agency's mission to a public that is often unaware of its involvement in weather prediction and forecasting."

Proenza had been particularly outspoken in his desire to see a replacement for the aging QuikSCAT satellite, which measures surface winds over remote ocean areas, citing a study that says "the center's ability to track storms could dip as much as 16 percent when the satellite dies."

Three senior researchers, however, complained that Proenza overstated his case, unduly alarming the public and compromising the center's credibility. Jeff Masters, former NOAA meteorologist and operator of Weather Underground, said Proenza relied on an imperfect, unpublished study. Masters pointed to a different, more complete study, which stated that QuickSCAT's loss would have at most a "minor effect". The criticism snowballed, and in early July, he faced an open revolt as half of the center's employees signed a letter calling for Proenza's departure. The South Florida Sun-Sentinel described the letter:

"The undersigned staff of the National Hurricane Center has concluded that the center needs a new director," reads the one-paragraph statement signed by 23 employees. "The effective functioning of the National Hurricane Center is at stake." The letter concluded the center in Miami-Dade County needs to return its focus to storm prediction and "leave the political arena it now finds itself in."

As early as June 2007, National Oceanic and Atmospheric Administration (NOAA) administrator Vice Admiral Conrad Lautenbacher initiated an investigation into Proenza's management of the National Hurricane Center, prompted by concerns from Mary Glackin, acting director of the National Weather Service. On June 26, Lautenbacher received permission from Secretary of Commerce Carlos M. Gutierrez to take action against Proenza should it be necessary.

Lautenbacher requested that the National Institute of Standards and Technology (NIST) form an independent "management assessment team" which would travel to the National Hurricane Center and evaluate the management situation. This team was personally headed by NIST deputy director James Turner, who delivered the team's final report. The above-mentioned letter was signed by the employees while the assessment team was visiting the hurricane center. This fact caused Proenza to speculate that the letter signing may have been engineered by vengeful NOAA management.

On July 9, 2007, Proenza was placed on administrative leave. Deputy director Edward Rappaport took over as interim director.

On July 13, the management assessment team formally delivered its final report to administrator Lautenbacher. The report concluded that Proenza's management style was ineffective, that his continued presence would interfere with the ability of the National Hurricane Center to perform its vital functions, and that Proenza should be removed as director of the center. Lautenbacher then requested that the NIST assessment team formulate specific recommendations within 2 weeks. At a joint congressional subcommittee hearing on July 19, Lautenbacher testified that he had not yet determined what final actions would be taken regarding Proenza and the National Hurricane Center. He stated, however, that his final decision would be based entirely on the recommendations of the assessment team.

== Accomplishments ==
Proenza was a councilor for the National Weather Association in 1991. The NWS Employee's Organization recognized him as the NWS manager of the year for 1998. The NWS Employees' Organization also recognized Proenza nationally as the NWS Manager of 1998 for his collaborative leadership with their union. In 2001, the American Meteorological Society recognized him with its prestigious Francis W. Reichelderfer Award for outstanding environmental services to the nation.

Preceded by Max Mayfield	Director of the National Hurricane Center; 2007	Succeeded by Edward Rappaport
