= Bill Read =

American meteorologist

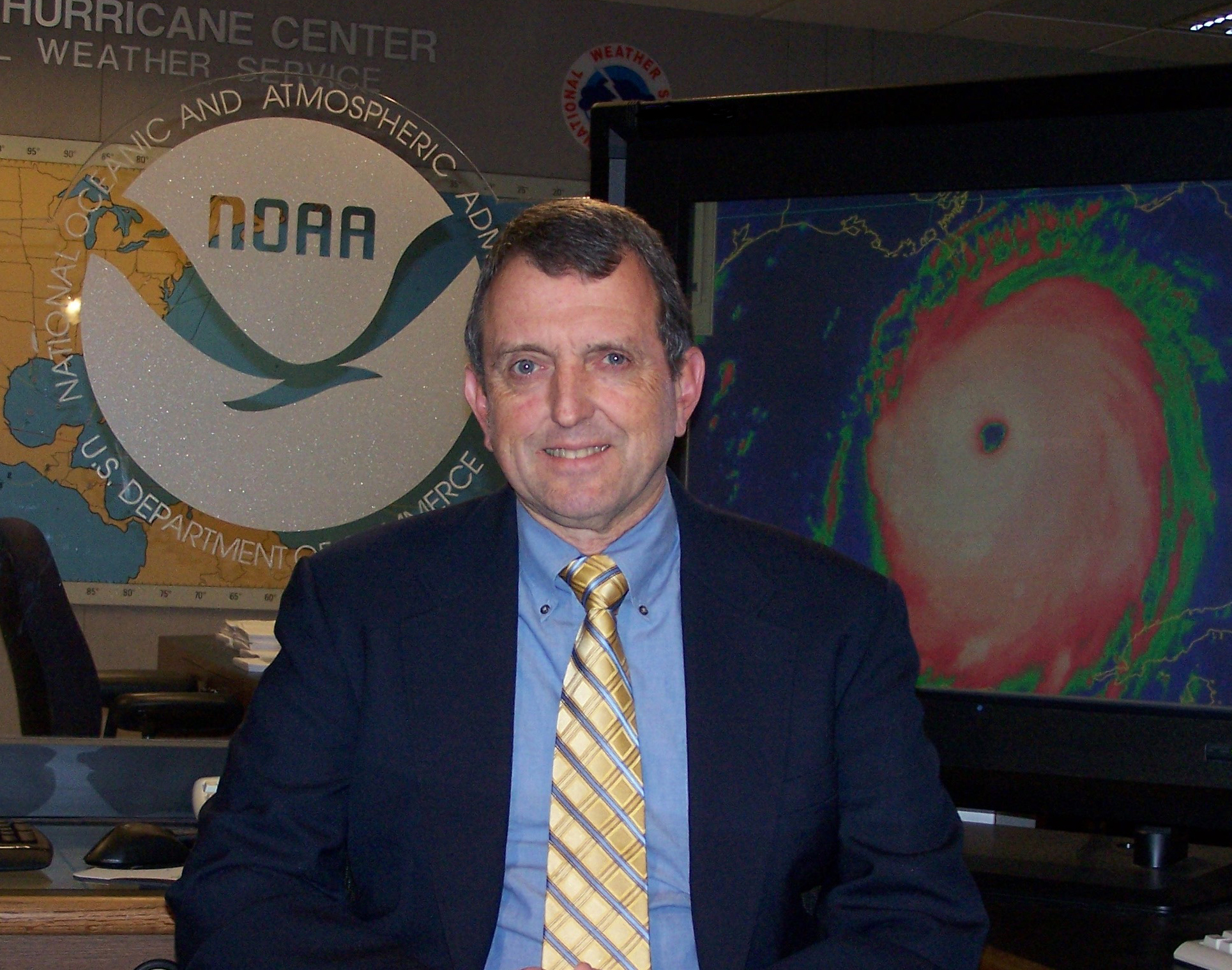
- Read in 2008.
- Born: 1949 or 1950 (age 76–77)
- Alma mater: Texas A&M University
- Occupation: Meteorologist
- Employer: National Weather Service; United States Navy
- Position held: director (2008–2012), acting director (2007–2008)

William L. Read (born 1949 or 1950) is an American meteorologist who served in the United States Navy, the National Weather Service (NWS), and as consultant for television stations such as KPRC-TV during his career. He has worked at NWS offices in Sterling, Virginia, Fort Worth, Texas, San Antonio, Texas, Silver Spring, Maryland, Houston, Texas, and Miami, Florida over the years, reaching the post of director of the National Hurricane Center from January 25, 2008 until June 2012.

== Career ==
Read studied at Texas A&M, getting his B.Sc. in 1971. He then served four years in the U.S. Navy at different bases and as an on-board meteorologist with the Hurricane hunters. Returning for to Texas A&M, he obtained his M.Sc. in meteorology in 1976. He joined the National Weather Service in 1977 at the test and evaluation division in Sterling, Virginia. He then served as a forecaster in the Fort Worth and San Antonio, Texas offices before becoming the severe thunderstorm and flash flood program leader at the National Weather Service headquarters in Silver Spring, Maryland.

Read was appointed to direct the Houston/Galveston weather forecast office in 1992 and led it through the National Weather Service modernization and restructuring program of the mid-1990s. He was also part of the Hurricane Liaison Team at the National Hurricane Center in Miami, when Hurricane Isabel came ashore on the Outer Banks of North Carolina in September 2003.

Read became Deputy Director of the Tropical Prediction Center (TPC), which includes the National Hurricane Center and two other divisions, in Miami, Florida, in August 2007 until he was selected for the position of director in January 2008 and served until June 4, 2012 when relieved by Richard Knabb. After retirement, Read worked as a hurricane specialist to television networks, professor, and at the Institute for a Disaster Resilient Texas for Texas A&M at their Galveston Campus studying increased rainfall rates and hurricane behavior.

== Awards ==
Read received the National Hurricane Conference Public Education Award in Spring 2004 for hurricane preparedness efforts. Under his leadership, the Houston/Galveston forecast office conducted an annual Houston/Galveston Hurricane Workshop, which was considered the largest meeting of its kind in the United States.

Preceded by Edward N. Rappaport	Director of the National Hurricane Center; 2008	Succeeded by Richard Knabb
Preceded by Edward N. Rappaport	Deputy Director of the NHC (acting); 2007-2008	Succeeded by Edward N. Rappaport
