= National Hurricane Center =

United States government agency

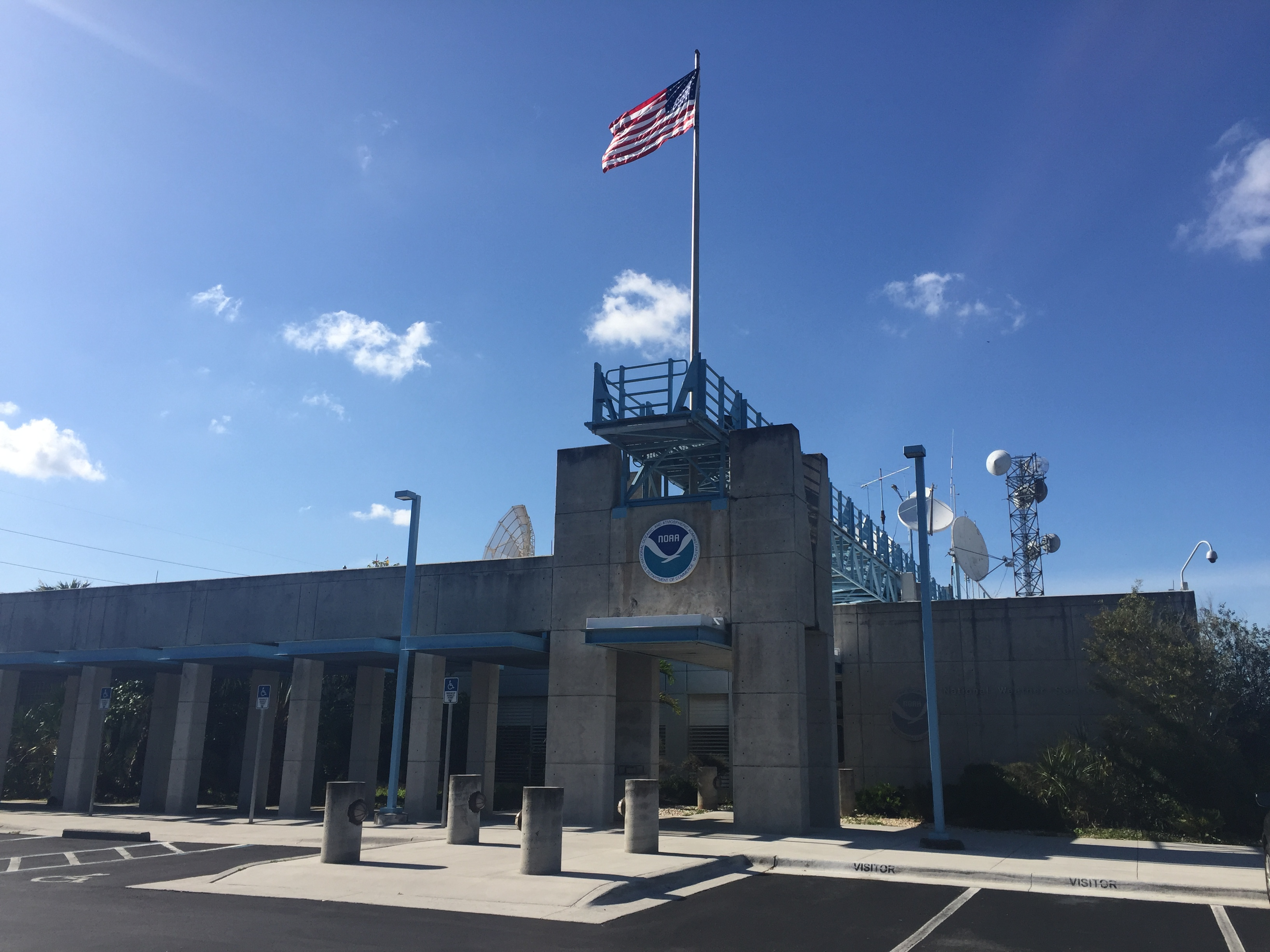
- Front view of the National Hurricane Center headquarters

Agency overview
- Formed: 1965; 61 years ago
- Jurisdiction: United States government
- Headquarters: University Park, Miami-Dade County, Florida, United States; 25°45′16″N 80°23′01″W
- Agency executive: Mike Brennan, Director
- Parent agency: NOAA
- Website: www.nhc.noaa.gov

The National Hurricane Center (NHC) is the division of the United States' NOAA/National Weather Service responsible for tracking and predicting tropical weather systems between the Prime Meridian westward to the International Dateline and poleward to the 30th parallel north in the northeast Pacific Ocean and the 31st parallel north in the northern Atlantic Ocean. The agency, which is co-located with the Miami branch of the National Weather Service, is situated on the campus of Florida International University in University Park, Miami, Florida.

The NHC's Tropical Analysis and Forecast Branch (TAFB) routinely issues marine forecasts, in the form of graphics and high seas forecasts year round, with the Ocean Prediction Center having backup responsibility for this unit. The Technology and Science Branch (TSB) provides technical support for the center, which includes new infusions of technology from abroad. The Chief, Aerial Reconnaissance Coordination, All Hurricanes (CARCAH) unit tasks planes, for research and operational purposes, to tropical cyclones during the Atlantic hurricane season and significant weather events, including snow storms, during winter and spring. Research to improve operational forecasts is done through the Hurricane Forecast Improvement Project (HFIP) and Joint Hurricane Test Bed (JHT) initiatives.

During the Atlantic and northeast Pacific hurricane seasons, the Hurricane Specialist Unit (HSU) issues routine tropical weather outlooks for the northeast Pacific and northern Atlantic oceans. When tropical storm or hurricane conditions are expected within 48 hours, the center issues watches and warnings via the news media and National Oceanic and Atmospheric Administration (NOAA) Weather Radio.

Although the NHC is an agency of the United States, the World Meteorological Organization has designated it as the Regional Specialized Meteorological Centre for the North Atlantic, eastern Pacificm and central Pacific, making it the clearinghouse for tropical cyclone forecasts and observations occurring in these areas. If the NHC loses power or becomes incapacitated, the Weather Prediction Center backs up tropical cyclone advisories and tropical weather outlooks for the North Atlantic Ocean.

== History ==
=== Early history ===
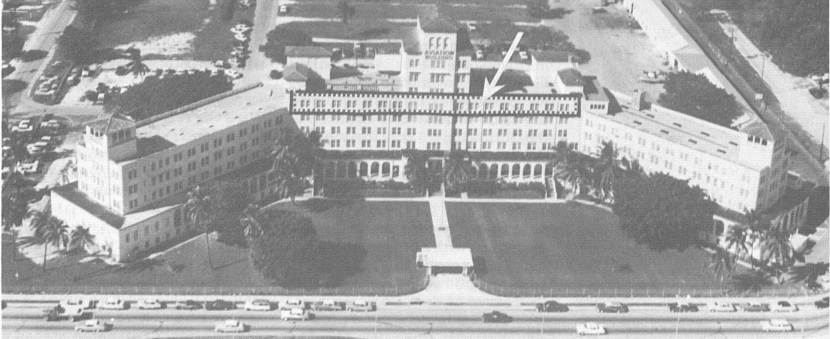
Location of Miami Hurricane Warning Office, depicted by the arrow, 1958–1964

The first hurricane warning service was set up in the 1870s from Cuba with the work of Father Benito Viñes. After his death, hurricane warning services were assumed by the United States Signal Corps and United States Weather Bureau over the next decade, first based in Jamaica in 1898 and Cuba in 1899 before shifting to Washington, D.C., in 1902.

The central office in Washington, which evolved into the National Meteorological Center and Weather Prediction Center (formerly known as the Hydrometeorological Prediction Center), assumed hurricane warning/advisory responsibility at that time. This responsibility passed to regional hurricane offices in 1935, and the concept of the Atlantic hurricane season was established to keep a vigilant lookout for tropical cyclones during certain times of the year. Hurricane advisories issued every six hours by the regional hurricane offices began at this time.

The Jacksonville hurricane warning office moved to Miami, Florida, in 1943. Tropical cyclone naming began for Atlantic tropical cyclones using the Joint Army/Navy Phonetic Alphabet by 1947. In 1950, the Miami Hurricane Warning Office began to prepare the annual hurricane season summary articles. In the 1953 Atlantic season, the United States Weather Bureau began naming storms which reach tropical storm intensity with human names.

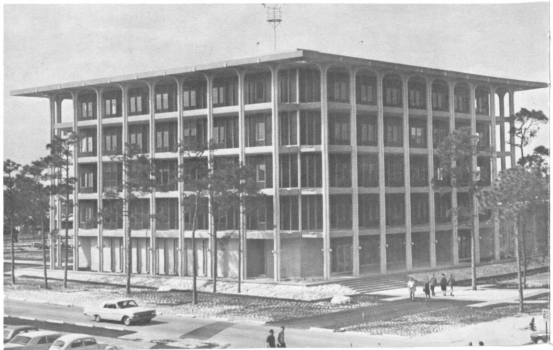
Building which housed NHC from 1964 to 1978 at the University of Miami (Ungar Building)

The National Hurricane Research Project, begun in the 1950s, used aircraft to study tropical cyclones and carry out experiments on mature hurricanes through its Project Stormfury. On July 1, 1956, a National Hurricane Information Center was established in Miami, Florida, which became a warehouse for all hurricane-related information from one United States Weather Bureau office. The Miami Hurricane Warning Office (HWO) moved from Lindsey Hopkins Hotel to the Aviation Building 4 miles (6.4 km) to the northwest on July 1, 1958. Forecasts within the hurricane advisories were issued one day into the future in 1954 before being extended to two days into the future in 1961, three days into the future in 1964, and five days into the future in 2001. The Miami HWO moved to the campus of the University of Miami in 1964, and was referred to as the NHC in 1965. The Miami HWO tropical cyclone reports were done regularly and took on their modern format in 1964.

=== As the National Hurricane Center ===
National Hurricane Center directors
Director	Tenure	Ref.
Gordan Dunn	1965–1967	
Robert Simpson	1968–1973	
Neil Frank	1973–1987	
Bob Sheets	1988–1995	
Bob Burpee	1995–1997	
Jerry Jarrell	1998–2000	
Max Mayfield	2000–2007	
Bill Proenza	2007	
Edward Rappaport (Note: Rappaport served as acting director following the retirements of Proenza and Knabb until a new director was appointed.)	2007–2008	
Bill Read	2008–2012	
Rick Knabb	2012–2017	
Edward Rappaport	2017–2018	
Kenneth Graham	2018–2022	
Jamie Rhome (Note: Rhome served as acting director following the promotion of Kenneth Graham to the position of director of the National Weather Service.)	2022–2023	
Mike Brennan	2023–present	

Beginning in 1973, the National Meteorological Center duties (renamed the Hydrometeorological Prediction Center; renamed for a second time in 2013) gained advisory responsibility for tracking and publicizing inland tropical depressions. The World Meteorological Organization assumed control of the Atlantic hurricane naming list in 1977. In 1978, the NHC's offices moved off the campus of the University of Miami across U.S. Highway 1 to the IRE Financial Building. Male names were added into the hurricane list beginning in the 1979 season. The hurricane warning offices remained active past 1983.

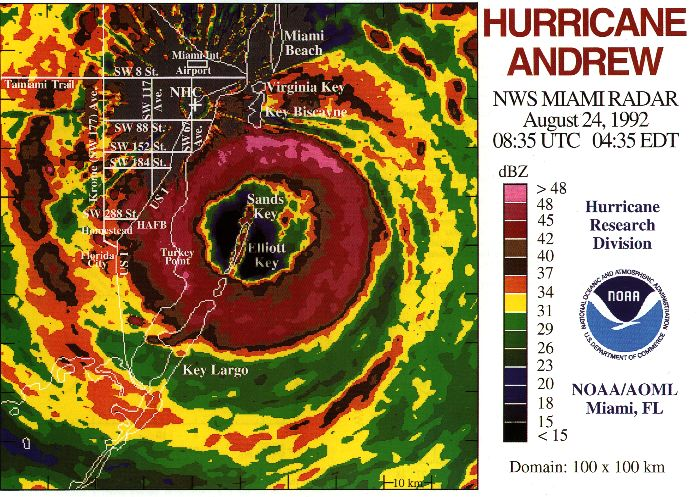
The last image from NWS Miami's WSR-57 at the National Hurricane Center, taken just moments before the radar was blown off its mounts by Hurricane Andrew.

In 1984, the NHC was separated from the Miami Weather Service Forecast Office, which meant the meteorologist in charge at Miami was no longer in a supervisory position over the hurricane center director. By 1988, the NHC gained responsibility for eastern Pacific tropical cyclones as the former Eastern Pacific Hurricane Center in San Francisco was decommissioned. In 1992, Hurricane Andrew blew the WSR-57 weather radar and the anemometer off the roof of NHC's/the Miami State Weather Forecast offices. The radar was replaced with a WSR-88D NEXRAD system in April 1993 installed near Metro Zoo, near where Hurricane Andrew made landfall.

In 1995, the NHC moved into a new hurricane-resistant facility on the campus of Florida International University, capable of withstanding 130 mph (210 km/h) winds. Its name was changed to the Tropical Prediction Center in 1995. After the name change to TPC, the hurricane specialists were grouped as a separate NHC unit under the Tropical Prediction Center, separating themselves from the Tropical Analysis and Forecast Branch. On October 1, 2010, the Tropical Prediction Center was renamed the NHC, and the group formerly known as the NHC became known as the Hurricane Specialist Unit (HSU). From June 1, 2025, the Central Pacific Hurricane Center (CPHC) operational functions in the central Pacific basin were unified under the NHC as a proof of concept, and the NHC formally assumed responsibility for the central Pacific in August of the following year.

Tropical cyclone forecasting uses statistical methods based on tropical cyclone climatology, as well as methods of numerical weather prediction where computers use mathematical equations of motion to determine their movement. The World Meteorological Organization continues to create and maintain the annual hurricane naming lists. Naming lists use a six-year rotation, with the deadliest or most infamous storm names retired from the rotation.

== Organization ==
For the fiscal year of 2008, the budget for the NHC was $6.8 million. The NHC staff has 66 members including 12 managers. The NHC is one of nine national centers which compose the National Centers for Environmental Prediction (NCEP).

=== Hurricane Specialist Unit ===
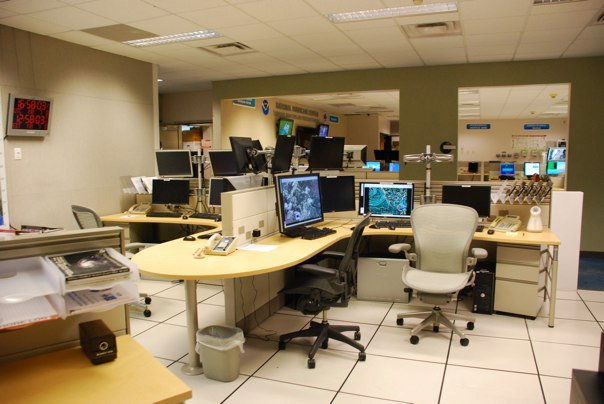
The HSU operations area comprises four desks (pictured) from which the tropics are monitored

Known as the NHC from 1995 through 2010, the hurricane specialists within the Hurricane Specialist Unit (HSU) are the chief meteorologists that predict the actions of tropical storms. The specialists work rotating eight-hour shifts from May through November, monitoring weather patterns in the Atlantic and Eastern Pacific oceans. Whenever a tropical or subtropical cyclone forms, they issue advisories every six hours until the storm is over. Public advisories are issued more often when the storm expected to be of tropical storm or hurricane intensity threatens land. The specialists coordinate with officials in each country likely to be affected. They forecast and recommend watches and warnings.

During the hurricane season, the HSU routinely issues their Tropical Weather Outlook product, which identifies areas of concern within the tropics which could develop into tropical cyclones. If systems occur outside the defined hurricane season, the HSU issues special Tropical Weather Outlooks. Backup responsibility for their northeast Pacific area resides at the Central Pacific Hurricane Center (CPHC), and vice versa if CPHC were to have communication issues. North Atlantic responsibilities are backed up by the Weather Prediction Center (WPC). Routine coordination occurs at 1700 UTC each day between the Weather Prediction Center and National Hurricane Center to identify systems for the pressure maps three to seven days into the future within the tropics, and points for existing tropical cyclones six to seven days into the future. Outside of the hurricane season, the specialists concentrate on public education efforts.

On April 30, 2020, senior hurricane specialist Lixion Avila retired after working at the NHC since 1987. On January 3, 2022, it was announced that senior hurricane specialist Stacy Stewart, who also served in the U.S. Navy reserves, retired after working at the NHC since 1999. He retired due to surgeries and post-surgical effects after being injured in Iraq.

Hurricane Specialist Unit
Daniel Brown	Jack Beven, Ph.D.	Richard Pasch, Ph.D.	Robbie Berg	John Cangialosi	Vacant
Branch Chief	Senior Hurricane Specialist	Senior Hurricane Specialist	Senior Hurricane Specialist	Senior Hurricane Specialist	Warning Coordination Meteorologist
Eric Blake	Lisa Bucci, Ph.D.	Larry Kelly	Dave Roberts	Philippe Papin, Ph.D.	Brad Reinhart
Senior Hurricane Specialist	Hurricane Specialist	Hurricane Specialist	U.S. Navy Hurricane Specialist	Hurricane Specialist	Hurricane Specialist

=== Tropical Analysis and Forecast Branch ===
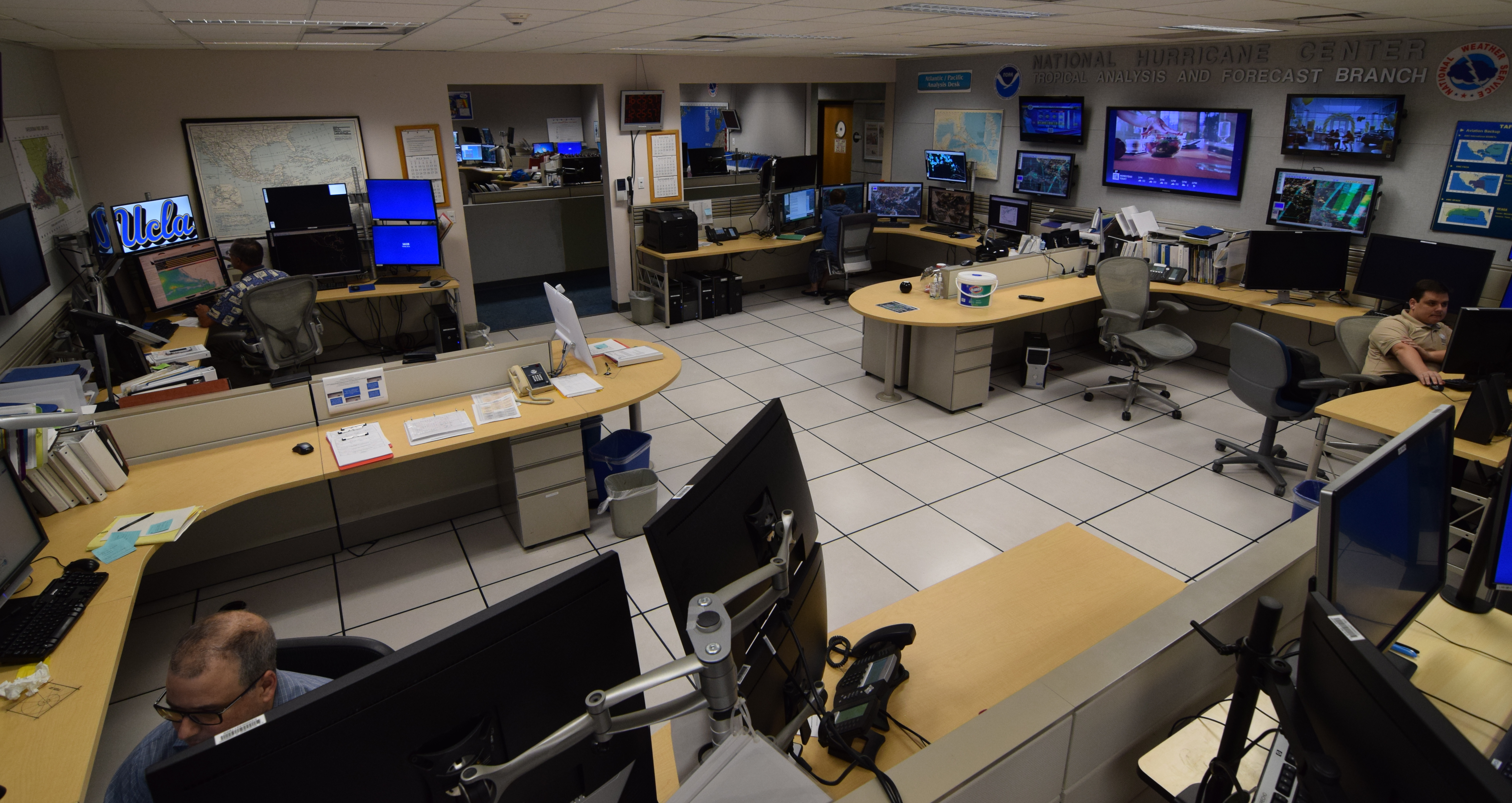
A panoramic view of TAFB's operations at the NHC in 2018

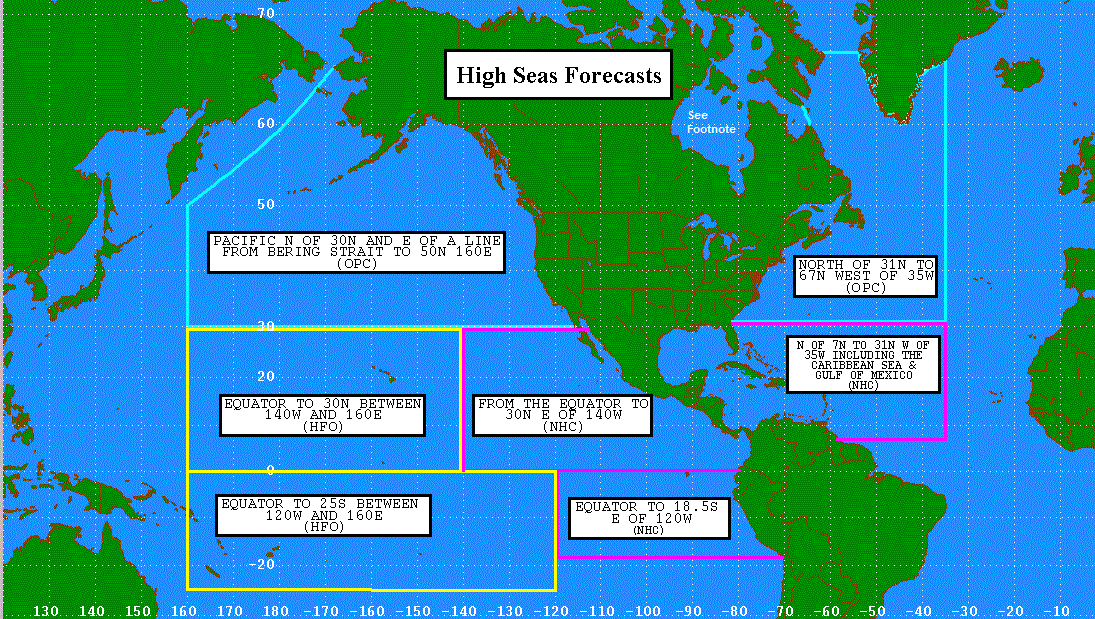
The National Weather Service areas of marine weather forecasting responsibility

The Tropical Analysis and Forecast Branch (TAFB, formerly the Tropical Satellite Analysis and Forecast unit and the Tropical Analysis Center) is a part of the National Hurricane Center and was created in 1967. The TAFB is responsible for high seas analyses and forecasts for tropical portions of the Atlantic and Pacific between the Prime Meridian and the 140th meridian west poleward to the 30th parallel north in the northeast Pacific Ocean and the 31st parallel north in the northern Atlantic Ocean. Unlike the Hurricane Specialist Unit (HSU), TAFB is staffed full-time around the year. Other responsibilities of the TAFB include satellite-derived tropical cyclone position and intensity estimates, WSR-88D radar fixes for tropical cyclones, tropical cyclone forecast support, media support, and general operational support. The Ocean Prediction Center backs up TAFB in the event of a communications outage, and vice versa.

Tropical Analysis and Forecast Branch
	Christopher Landsea, Ph.D.	Eric Christenen	Andrew Levine	Jeffrey Lewitsky	Scott Stripling	Stephen Konarik	
	Branch Chief	Lead Forecaster	Lead Forecaster	Lead Forecaster	Lead Forecaster	Lead Forecaster	
	Jorge Aguirre-Echevarria	Amanda Reinhart	Vacant	Gladys Rubio	Nelsie Ramos, Ph.D.	Evelyn Rivera-Acevedo	
	Forecaster	Forecaster	Forecaster	Forecaster	Forecaster	Forecaster	
Mike Tichacek	Sandy Delgado	Patrick Chan	Cassandra Mora	Andrew Hagen	Heather Nepaul, Ph.D.	Dylan Flynn	Aidan Mahoney
							Aidan Mahoney NHC
Surface Analyst Forecaster	Surface Analyst Forecaster	Surface Analyst Forecaster	Surface Analyst Forecaster	Surface Analyst Forecaster	Surface Analyst Forecaster	Surface Analyst Forecaster	Pathways Intern

=== Technology and Science Branch ===
The Technology & Science Branch (TSB) develops and transitions new tools and techniques into operations for tropical weather prediction in conjunction with other government and academic entities. TSB created and continues development of the Automated Tropical Cyclone Forecasting (ATCF) system, used to incorporate various data and model outputs, create and update HURDAT, and to generate tropical cyclone forecasts. The TSB provides support for NHC computer and communications systems including its website. TSB maintains a number of statistical and dynamical models used in predicting both tropical cyclone behavior and associated weather conditions. The Storm Surge Unit, which develops and maintains software to forecast the storm surge of tropical cyclones, is part of this branch. The Techniques Development and Applications Unit (TDAU) is part of TSB.

=== CARCAH ===
The Chief, Aerial Reconnaissance Coordination, All Hurricanes (CARCAH) is a subunit of the 53d Weather Reconnaissance Squadron (Hurricane Hunters). CARCAH's mission is to provide a point-of-contact and to coordinate all tropical cyclone operational reconnaissance requirements at NHC and the Central Pacific Hurricane Center for the North Atlantic, Caribbean, Gulf of Mexico, and the North Pacific basin east of the International Date Line in accordance with the National Hurricane Operations Plan (NHOP). During the winter, CARCAH coordinates the Atlantic and Pacific winter storm requirements in support of the National Winter Storms Operations Plan (NWSOP). Missions are flown in advance of the high-impact weather events forecast to affect the U.S., such as heavy snowfall, and at times when there is significant uncertainty within/between numerical weather prediction output.

=== HLT ===
The Hurricane Liaison Team (HLT) supports hurricane response through information exchange between the NHC, the National Weather Service (NOAA/NWS), and the emergency management community. The HLT is composed of federal, state, and local emergency managers, as well as NWS meteorologists and hydrologists, who maintain open lines of communication about the progress and threat level of the storm with appropriate Federal, state, and local officials. The team establishes and facilitates video and/or teleconferences with the NHC, FEMA and other Federal agencies, state Emergency Operations Centers (EOCs), Weather Prediction Center (WPC), Storm Prediction Center (SPC), and River Forecast Centers (RFCs). During significant landfalling hurricanes, the president of the United States as well as affected city mayors and state governors join the daily briefing call, which occurs at noon Eastern Daylight Time.

== Research ==
As part of their annual tropical cyclone activity, the agency issues a tropical cyclone report on every tropical cyclone in the Atlantic and Eastern Pacific Ocean basins, which are available since 1958 and 1988, respectively. The report summarizes the synoptic history, meteorological statistics, casualties and damages, and the post-analysis best track of a storm. The reports were formally known as Preliminary Reports up until 1999. The agency maintains archives and climatological statistics on Atlantic and Pacific hurricane history, including annual reports on every tropical cyclone, a complete set of tropical cyclone advisories, digitized copies of related materials on older storms, season summaries published as the Monthly Weather Review, and HURDAT, which is the official tropical cyclone database.

Programs are dedicated to improving the accuracy of tropical cyclone forecasts from the center. The Joint Hurricane Testbed (JHT) is a joint operation between the National Oceanic and Atmospheric Administration (NOAA) and United States Weather Research Program to speed up the transfer of tropical cyclone-related research into forecast operations. Since 2001, with its annual budget of between $1.0 and $1.5 million, the JHT has funded 62 initiatives, with most of them being implemented operationally. The projects have had varied success, ranging from minor to significant advances in the way the NHC operates. The Hurricane Forecast Improvement Program's (HFIP) five-year goal is to lead to a 20 percent improvement within the numerical weather prediction models provided by the National Centers for Environmental Prediction to NHC by 2015 and a 50 percent improvement within tropical cyclone track forecasting and intensity guidance by 2020.

== See also ==
- Bureau of Meteorology (Australia)
- Canadian Hurricane Centre
- Central Pacific Hurricane Center
- India Meteorological Department
- Japan Meteorological Agency
- Joint Typhoon Warning Center
- Fiji Meteorological Service
- Centre météorologique régional spécialisé cyclones de La Réunion (La Réunion) in French (French: Météo-France: Centre météorologique régional spécialisé cyclones de La Réunion)
- Meteorological Service of New Zealand Limited
- Tropical Cyclone Warning Centre (TCWC Jakarta) (Indonesia) (Indonesian: Badan Meteorologi, Klimatologi, dan Geofisika: Pusat Peringatan Dini Siklon Tropis)
- Late December 1999 European storms
