= Max Mayfield =

American meteorologist (born 1948)

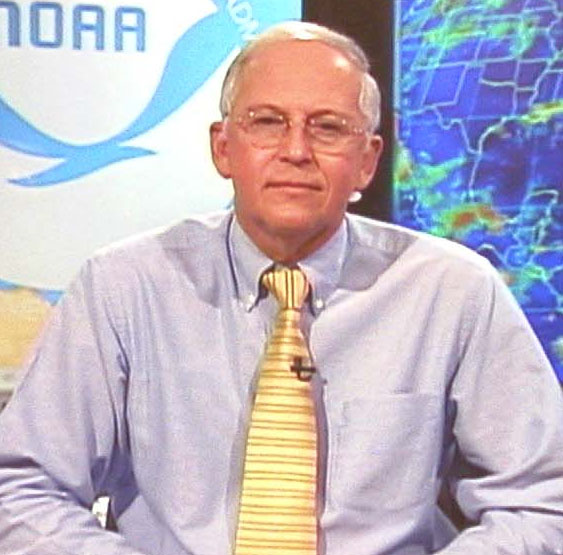
- Born: Britt Max Mayfield; September 19, 1948 (age 77); Oklahoma City, Oklahoma
- Education: Florida State University; University of Oklahoma
- Occupation: Former director of the National Hurricane Center

Britt Max Mayfield (born September 19, 1948) is an American meteorologist who served as the director of the National Hurricane Center from 2000 to 2007. As director, Mayfield became a trusted voice in preparing for weather-related disasters, particularly those involving tropical storms and hurricanes.

== Career ==
Mayfield began his forecasting career with the United States Air Force in 1970, after graduating from the University of Oklahoma with a bachelor's degree in mathematics, serving as a first lieutenant until 1972. In 1972, Mayfield joined the National Weather Service as a satellite meteorologist. Mayfield earned his master's degree in meteorology at Florida State University in 1987, becoming a hurricane specialist. Max became the director of the National Hurricane Center in January 2000 after the retirement of Jerry Jarrell.

Mayfield is the current chairman of the World Meteorological Organization's Regional Association-IV, which supports 26 members from Atlantic and eastern Pacific countries. He is one subject of a 2008 documentary titled New Orleans Story concerning Hurricane Katrina, which is currently in post-production.

Mayfield stepped down from his position as Director of the National Hurricane Center in January 2007 and was succeeded by Bill Proenza. On April 1, 2007 he joined Miami-based local television station WPLG as hurricane specialist. He retired from WPLG on November 22, 2019.

Max Mayfield is married to Linda Mayfield. They have three children: Lee, Lindsay, and Lauren.

== Awards ==
Mayfield received Gold medals for his work during Hurricane Andrew in 1992 and Hurricane Isabel in 2003. He received a silver medal for work done during Hurricane Gilbert in 1988. In 1996, the American Meteorological Society presented Mayfield the Francis W. Reichelderfer Award for his service in coordinating the National Hurricane Center's hurricane preparedness training for emergency preparedness officials and the general public. Mayfield also received an Outstanding Achievement Award at the 2000 National Hurricane Conference for developing and expanding training opportunities for state and local officials. At the 2004 Interdepartmental Hurricane Conference, he received the Richard Hagemeyer Award for his contributions to the United States' hurricane warning program. Also in 2004, he received an Emmy Award for extraordinary contributions to television by someone not normally eligible for Emmy awards. In 2005, Mayfield became ABC's person of the week after Hurricane Katrina. He also received a Presidential Rank Award for Meritorious Service in 2005. The Saturday before Katrina hit, Mayfield personally called the mayor of New Orleans to emphasize how serious the threat was to the city. He told TIME magazine, "This was only the second time I called a politician in my life. I wanted to be able to go to sleep knowing I had done everything I could do." The next morning, Mayor Nagin finally called for a mandatory evacuation.

Preceded by Jerry Jarrell	Director of the National Hurricane Center; 2000–2007	Succeeded by Bill Proenza
